= Permanent Under-Secretary of State for Defence =

Office in the UK Ministry of Defense

Permanent Under-Secretary for Defence
- Royal Arms as used by His Majesty's Government

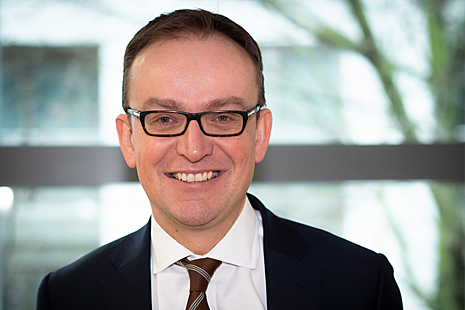
- Incumbent; Jeremy Pocklington since 31 October 2025
- Ministry of Defence
- Style: Permanent Secretary
- Member of: Defence Council; Defence Board; Defence Audit and Risk Assurance Committee; People Committee; Investment Approvals Committee; Executive Committee
- Reports to: Secretary of State for Defence; Cabinet Secretary
- Seat: Ministry of Defence, London
- Appointer: Prime Minister
- Inaugural holder: Henry Hardman
- Formation: 1963
- Deputy: Second Permanent Secretary
- Salary: SCS Pay Band 4

The permanent under-secretary of state for defence, also called the permanent secretary to the Ministry of Defence, is the permanent secretary at the Ministry of Defence. The office holder is the government's principal civilian adviser on defence matters. The office holder is a member of the Defence Council and the Defence Board. They are the MOD principal accounting officer, and are called to give evidence to the Defence Select Committee.

The position has existed in its current format since the formation of the modern Ministry of Defence in 1964. It was preceded by the permanent secretary at the earlier Ministry of Defence (1947–1964), and by the permanent secretaries at the government departments that were absorbed into the Ministry of Defence in 1964: the permanent secretary to the Admiralty, the permanent under-secretary of state for war, and the permanent secretary to the Air Ministry.

The current permanent secretary for the Ministry of Defence is Jeremy Pocklington.

== Responsibilities ==
- Leading defence (with CDS);
- Setting strategy for defence, including corporate strategy (subject to ministers’ direction, and together with CDS);
- Heading the Department of State and the MOD Civil Service;
- Providing policy advice to ministers and leading the relationship with other government departments;
- The overall organisation, management and staffing of defence;
- Performing the full range of Accounting Officer responsibilities, including the delegation of financial and other authority and accountability to senior colleagues, with personal accountability to Parliament for the economic, efficient and effective use of defence resources.

== Permanent secretaries to the Ministry of Defence ==
=== 1947–1964 ===
The permanent secretaries at the earlier Ministry of Defence (1947–1964):

- 1947: Sir Henry Wilson Smith
- 1948: Sir Harold Parker
- 1956: Sir Richard Powell
- 1960: Sir Edward Playfair
- 1961: Sir Robert Scott
- 1964: Sir Henry Hardman

=== 1964–present ===
- Henry Hardman (1964–1966)
- James Dunnett (1966–1974)
- Michael Cary (1974–1976)
- Frank Cooper (1976–1982)
- Clive Whitmore (1982–1988)
- Michael Quinlan (1988–1992)
- Christopher France (1992–1995)
- Richard Mottram (1995–1998)
- Kevin Tebbit (1998–2005)
- Bill Jeffrey (2005–2010)
- Ursula Brennan (2010–2012)
- Jon Thompson (2012–2016)
- Stephen Lovegrove (2016–2021)
- David Williams (2021–2025)
- Jeremy Pocklington (2025-)
