= Martin Flett =

English civil servant

Sir Martin Teall Flett, KCB (30 July 1911 – 25 February 1982) was an English civil servant. Educated at St John's College, Oxford, he entered the civil service in 1933 as an official in the Dominions Office; he moved to HM Treasury in 1934, where he remained (except for the period 1944 to 1946) until 1956, when he moved to the Ministry of Power. In 1961, he was transferred to the Air Ministry and served as its Permanent Secretary from 1963 to 1964, when it was merged into the Ministry of Defence; there he was Second Permanent Secretary with responsibility for the Royal Air Force from 1964 to 1968, and then Second Permanent Secretary for Equipment until 1971. He was the son of the geologist Sir John Flett.

Government offices
Preceded by Sir Maurice Dean	Permanent Secretary of the Air Ministry; 1963–1964	Succeeded by position abolished Sir Henry Hardman (as Permanent Secretary, Ministry of Defence) himself (as Second Permanent Secretary, Ministry of Defence (Royal Air Force))
Preceded by none himself (as Permanent Secretary of the Air Ministry)	Second Permanent Secretary of the Ministry of Defence (Royal Air Force); 1964–1968	Succeeded by position abolished himself (as Second Permanent Secretary (Equipment)); Sir Arthur Drew (as Second Permanent Secretary (Administration))
Preceded by himself (as Second Permanent Secretary (Royal Air Force)); Sir Michael Cary (as Second Permanent Secretary (Royal Navy)); Sir Arthur Drew (as Second Permanent Secretary (Army)); Sir Ronald Melville (as Second Permanent Secretary until 1966)	Second Permanent Secretary of the Ministry of Defence (Equipment); 1968–1971; With: Sir Arthur Drew (as Second Permanent Secretary (Administration))	Succeeded by position abolished
