= Zotov =

Zotov (Russian, Ukrainian: Зо́тов) or Zotova (Зо́това; feminine) is a Russian and Ukrainian surname derived from the old Russian word zod — sculpting clay that may refer to:

- Aleksandr Zotov (born 1990), Russian footballer
- Anatoly Zotov, naval attaché to the Soviet Embassy in London
- Georgi Zotov (born 1990), Russian footballer
- Nikita Zotov (1644–1717), childhood tutor of Peter the Great
- Oleksandr Zotov (born 1975), Ukrainian footballer
- Victor Zotov (1908–1977), New Zealand botanist
- Natalia Zotov, New Zealand-born cosmologist
- Vladimir Zotov (1821–1896), writer
