= Vicky de Lambray =

British male prostitute

- Born: 1950; Herefordshire, West Midlands, England
- Died: August 1986 (aged 35–36); Stockwell, London, England
- Other names: Vikki de Lambray; David Christian Lloyd-Gibbon; David Gibbon; Louis de Rothschild; Caroline Clark
- Occupation: Sex worker

Vicky de Lambray (also known as Vikki de Lambray and previously David Christian Lloyd-Gibbon or David Gibbon) was a British transgender prostitute who became a favourite of Fleet Street gossip columnists. In an essay called "London Grandeur" Phaedra Kelly says that de Lambray claimed she would be "the most famous transgenderist ever and die dramatically at the age of 30".

== Early life ==
De Lambray was born in Herefordshire and attended a public school, before running away to London while still a teenager. There, she became a sex worker and worked as a female impersonator.

== Life in London ==
De Lambray claimed she was addicted to the idea of becoming famous. She regularly hired a Rolls-Royce with the funds she received from prostituting herself in Shepherd Market in London's West End. She would place a large "Vicky de Lambray – Entertainer" sign in the back of the Rolls and drive for hours around central London or park outside Harrods. De Lambray once changed her name by deed poll to Louis de Rothschild, hoping she would be confused as a Rothschild family member. The Rothschild family paid her ten thousand pounds to change it back.

De Lambray was often in the headlines because of court appearances, sex scandals and claims that she was a spy. In March 1983, a senior British civil servant, Sir James Dunnett, was questioned by Scotland Yard detectives over a brief sexual encounter he had had with de Lambray in the early years of his retirement. Official concern over this liaison stemmed from the claim of the prostitute that a Soviet spy had also been among her clients at that time, a circumstance which might, given Dunnett's former position at the Ministry of Defence, have constituted a security risk. In the event, Ministry of Defence officials satisfied themselves that Dunnett's actions had constituted no threat to national security.

At her trial for the theft of Dunnett's credit cards, de Lambray invented a persona named Caroline Clark. Clark claimed to major newspapers that she was an acquaintance of de Lambray's would sell Fleet Street newspapers the inside story about an upcoming trial involving a former spy chief. This ruse was extremely profitable for de Lambray, who was splashed over the front pages of newspapers - as was Sir James Dunnett. The stories became more and more outrageous, with sex stories that would have been highly embarrassing for Dunnett.

Gay News carried a short article in September 1983, saying de Lambray was a convicted High Society art thief and apparent MI5 tempter/temptress, and noting her brief sexual relationship with Captain Anatoly Zotov, former Soviet Naval attache. De Lambray's 900-page autobiographical manuscript - "naming names" - went missing in the same year.

In May 1986, detectives investigating a series of homosexual murders found de Lambray's name listed in a suspect's address book. In July 1992, The Evening Standard reported that de Lambray was a friend of Private Eye journalist Paul Halloran. She was also a friend of British pop group manager and entrepreneur Kit Lambert.

It remains unclear whether de Lambray was, as claimed by some, a transsexual: "sometimes called TS but nobody knows for sure, nor will they now."

== Death ==
According to The Times, de Lambray died in her flat in Stockwell, south London in August 1986 following a suspected heroin overdose. Three hours before she was found, de Lambray telephoned the Press Association, telling a reporter, 'I have just been killed. I have been injected with a huge amount of heroin. I am desperate.' De Lambray's initial call to police, asserting that a group of men had injected the heroin into her, may not have been taken seriously. However, when they arrived Vicky was dead. No puncture marks were found on autopsy and no cause of death could be established, though traces of drugs and alcohol were detected in her system. She is buried at the family churchyard in Herefordshire.
