= Ronald Melville =

Ronald Melville may refer to:

- Ronald Melville (botanist)
- Ronald Melville (civil servant)
