= James Dunnett =

British civil servant

Sir James Dunnett GCB CMG
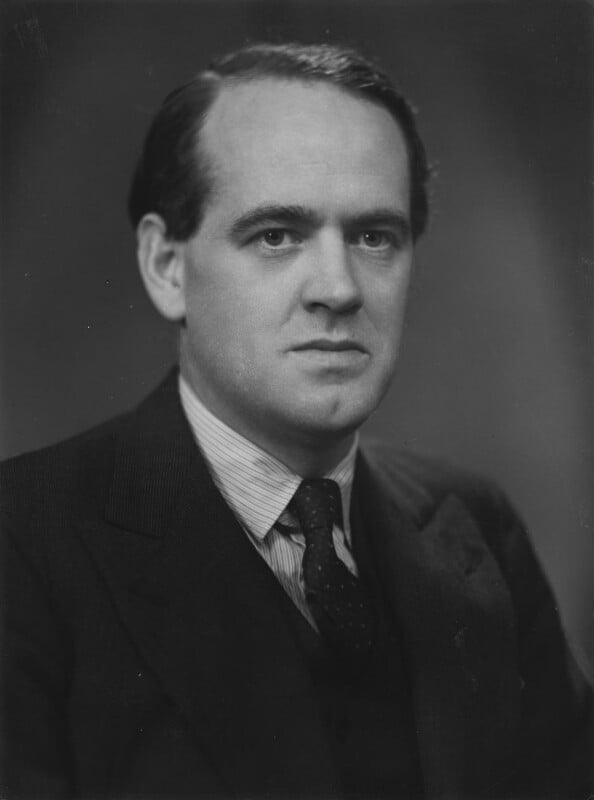
- Dunnett in 1951

Permanent Under-Secretary of State for Defence
- In office 1966–1974
- Preceded by: Henry Hardman
- Succeeded by: Michael Cary

Personal details
- Born: 12 February 1914
- Died: 30 December 1997 (aged 83)
- Education: University College, Oxford
- Occupation: Civil servant

Sir Ludovic James Dunnett, GCB, CMG (12 February 1914 – 30 December 1997) was a British civil servant.

== Early life ==
Born in India, he was the son of Sir James Macdonald Dunnett, a senior official in the Indian Civil Service. He grew up in Edinburgh before attending University College, Oxford. His siblings included the diplomat Denzil Dunnett (1917–2016) and Sir George Sangster Dunnett.

== Career ==
He entered the civil service in 1936 as an official in the Air Ministry. From 1938 to 1945, he was private secretary to the Permanent Secretary. In 1945, he moved to the Ministry of Civil Aviation and later moved to the Ministry of Supply, where he was a deputy secretary. He was then Permanent Secretary of the Ministry of Transport (from 1959 to 1962), the Ministry of Labour (from 1962 to 1966) and the Ministry of Defence (from 1966 to 1972).

In retirement, he was chairman of the International Maritime Industries Forum from 1976 to 1979, and president of the Institute of Manpower Studies from 1977 yo 1988. His second wife was the Hungarian-born artist Clarisse, née Feher. She was the widow of Grantley Loxton-Peacock and the insurance executive Sir Anthony Charles Grover, and the maternal grandmother (by her first marriage) of George Osborne.

=== Lambray incident ===
In 1979, five years after his retirement, Dunnett spent '50 minutes' with the transvestite prostitute Vicky de Lambray, who stole his chequebook. This incident drew the attention of the press as a result of Lambray's association with the Soviet naval attache Anatoly Zotov. An investigation by the Metropolitan Police found no security issue.

Government offices
Preceded by Sir Laurence Helsby	Permanent Secretary of the Ministry of Labour; 1962–1966	Succeeded by Sir Denis Barnes
Preceded by Sir Henry Hardman	Permanent Secretary of the Ministry of Defence; 1966–1974	Succeeded by Sir Michael Cary
