= 1964 New Year Honours =

British royal recognitions

The New Year Honours 1964 were appointments in many of the Commonwealth realms of Queen Elizabeth II to various orders and honours to reward and highlight good works by citizens of those countries. They were announced on 1 January 1964 to celebrate the year passed and mark the beginning of 1964.

== United Kingdom ==
=== Viscount ===
- The Right Honourable David McAdam, Baron Eccles, K.C.V.O. For public services.

=== Baron ===
- Roy Herbert Thomson, Esq., Chairman, The Thomson Organisation, Ltd. For public services.

=== Privy Counsellor ===
- Sir William Alexander Bustamante, Prime Minister and Minister of External Affairs, Jamaica, since August, 1962.
- George John Charles, Marquess of Lansdowne, D.L., Minister of State for Commonwealth Relations and for the Colonies, Joint Parliamentary Under-Secretary of State, Foreign Office, 1958–1962.
- The Right Honourable William Brereton Couchman, Baron Merthyr, T.D., Lord Chairman of Committees and Deputy Speaker, House of Lords, since 19S7.
- Sir Peter Anthony Grayson Rawlinson, Q.C., M.P., Member of Parliament for Epsom since 1955. Solicitor-General since July, 1962.
- Dr. Eric Williams, Prime Minister and Minister of External Affairs, Trinidad and Tobago, since August, 1962.

=== Baronet ===
- John Sinclair-Wemyss Arbuthnot, Esq., M.B.E., T.D., M.P., Member of Parliament for Dover since 1950; Parliamentary Private Secretary to the Parliamentary Secretary, Ministry of Pensions, 1952, and Ministry of Pensions and National Insurance, 1953–1955; and to the Parliamentary Secretary, Ministry of Health, 1956–1957; Second Parliamentary Church Estates Commissioner. For political and public services.
- Sir (Edward) Charles Dodds, M.V.O., M.D., P.R.C.P., President, Royal College of Physicians. Courtauld Professor of Biochemistry, University of London.
- Sir Clarence Johnston Graham. For political services in Northern Ireland.
- Humphrey Charles Baskerville Mynors, Esq., Deputy Governor, Bank of England, since March, 1954.
- William McEwan Younger, Esq., D.S.O., D.L. For political and public services.

=== Knight Bachelor ===
- Robert Ian Bellinger, The Aldermanic Sheriff, City of London.
- Henry Alexander Benson, C.B.E., Partner, Cooper Brothers and Company.
- Alderman Lionel William Biggs, J.P. For political and public services in Manchester and Macclesfield.
- Frank Patrick Bishop, M.B.E., M.P. Member of Parliament for Harrow Central since 1950. For political and public services.
- Edward Rowan Boland, C.B.E., M.D., F.R.C.P., M.R.C.S. Dean of the Medical School, Guy's Hospital. Honorary Consultant to the Army.
- Major Esme Tatton Cecil Brinton. For political and public services in Worcestershire.
- Norman Richard Rowley Brooke, C.B.E., J.P. For political and public services in Cardiff.
- Edward Humphrey Browne, C.B.E. Deputy Chairman, National Coal Board.
- Eric Maurice Clayson, Chairman and Joint Managing Director, The Birmingham Post and Mail, Ltd.
- Theodore Constantine, C.B.E., T.D. For political services in Harrow.
- Brigadier Douglas Inglis Crawford, C.B., D.S.O., T.D., D.L. For public services in Lancashire.
- Robert Vere Darwin, C.B.E., Principal, Royal College of Art.
- Philip Burrington Dingle, C.B.E., Town Clerk, Manchester.
- Edward James Dodd, C.B.E., H.M. Chief Inspector of Constabulary. Lately Chief Constable of Birmingham.
- Harry Douglass, General Secretary, Iron and Steel Trades Confederation.
- John Henry Gaddum, M.R.C.S., L.R.C.P., Director, Institute of Animal Physiology, Babraham, Cambridge, Agricultural Research Council.
- John Richard Hicks, Drummond Professor of Political Economy, University of Oxford.
- Ernest John Hunter, C.B.E., J.P., President, British Employers' Confederation.
- Cecil George Mant, C.B.E., Controller General, Ministry of Public Building and Works.
- Alexander Robert Mathewson, C.B.E. For political services in Edinburgh.
- Robert Gore Micklethwait, Q.C., National Insurance Commissioner and Industrial Injuries Commissioner.
- John Hubert Newsom, C.B.E., Deputy Chairman, Central Advisory Council for Education (England).
- Evan Angustus Norton, C.B.E., lately Chairman, United Birmingham Hospitals.
- Ronald Stanley Russell, M.P., Member of Parliament for Wembley South since 1950. Parliamentary Private Secretary to the Minister of Supply, 1951-1954 and to the Minister of Housing and Local Government, 1954–1955. For political and public services.
- John Arthur Guillum Scott, T.D., Secretary, The Church Assembly.
- Herbert John Seddon, C.M.G., D.M., F.R.C.S., Director of Studies, Institute of Orthopaedics, University of London.
- Barnett Stross, M.B., Ch.B., M.P., Member of Parliament for Stoke-on-Trent since 1950. Member of Parliament for Hanley, 1945–1950. For political and public services.
- Charles Sykes, C.B.E., Deputy Chairman, Thomas Firth and John Brown Ltd. For services to metallurgical research.
- Jules Thorn, Chairman and Managing Director, Thorn Electrical Industries Ltd.
- John Norman Toothill, C.B.E. For services to Scottish industry.

STATE OF VICTORIA

- The Honourable Percy Thomas Byrnes, a Member of the Legislative Council for the North-Western Province, State of Victoria.
- Michael Chamberlin, O.B.E., of Kew, State of Victoria. For services to the community.

STATE OF QUEENSLAND

- Douglas Stuart Forbes, of Brisbane, State of Queensland. For public services.

STATE OF SOUTH AUSTRALIA

- John Burton Cleland, C.B.E., M.D., Ch.M., Emeritus Professor of Pathology, University of Adelaide, State of South Australia.

STATE OF WESTERN AUSTRALIA

- The Honourable Lawrence Walter Jackson, Senior Puisne Judge of the Supreme Court of the State of Western Australia.

COMMONWEALTH RELATIONS

- Edward Daniel Weston Crawshaw, Q.C., Justice of Appeal of the Court of Eastern Africa.

OVERSEAS TERRITORIES

- Nicholas Patrick France Bonnetard, Chief Justice of the Seychelles.
- Richard Charles Catling, C.M.G., O.B.E., Inspector General of Police, Kenya.
- Stafford Lofthouse Sands, C.B.E. For public services in the Bahamas.
- Tang Shiu-Kin, C.B.E., J.P. For public services in Hong Kong.
- Frank Worrell, For services to cricket.

=== Order of the Bath ===
==== Knight Grand Cross (GCB) ====
Military Division

- Admiral Sir Deric Holland-Martin, K.C.B., D.S.O., D.S.C.

Civil Division

- Sir William Stuart Murrie, K.B.E., C.B., Permanent Under-Secretary of State, Scottish Office.

==== Knight Commander (KCB) ====
Military Division

- Vice-Admiral Richard Michael Smeeton, C.B., M.B.E.
- Vice-Admiral John Byng Frewen, C.B.
- Lieutenant-General Geoffrey Harding Baker, C.B., C.M.G., C.B.E., M.C. (50806), late Royal Regiment of Artillery.
- Lieutenant-General Charles Henry Pepys Harington, C.B., C.B.E., D.S.O., M.C. (44880), late Infantry. Colonel, The Cheshire Regiment.
- Acting Air Marshal John Gilbert Davis, C.B., O.B.E., Royal Air Force.

Civil Division

- Richard William Barnes Clarke, Esq., C.B., O.B.E., Second Secretary, H.M. Treasury.
- Arthur Charles Walter Drew, Esq., C.B., Permanent Under-Secretary of State, War Office.
- Sir Solly Zuckerman, C.B., M.D., Chief Scientific Adviser to the Minister of Defence.

==== Companion (CB) ====
Military Division

- Rear-Admiral Robert Love Alexander, D.S.O., D.S.C.
- Rear-Admiral Peter Noel Buckley, D.S.O.
- Rear-Admiral John Michael Dudgeon Gray, O.B.E.
- Rear-Admiral Peter John Hill-Norton.
- Rear-Admiral Morrice Alexander McMullen, O.B.E.
- Major-General Robert Anthony Pigot, O.B.E.
- Rear-Admiral John Earl Scotland, D.S.C.
- Major-General Norman Hastings Tailyour, D.S.O,
- Rear-Admiral Charles Peter Graham Walker, D.S.C.
- Rear-Admiral James Humphrey Walwyn, O.B.E.
- Major-General Mervyn Andrew Haldane Butler, C.B.E., D.S.O., M.C. (58152), late Infantry.
- Major-General George Francis de Gex, O.B.E. (50471), late Royal Regiment of Artillery.
- Major-General Ralph Henry Farrant (41112), late Royal Regiment of Artillery.
- Major-General Ian Henry Freeland, D.S.O. (53691), late Infantry.
- Major-General John Dutton Frost, D.S.O., M.C. (53721), late Infantry.
- Major-General Arthur Roderic Fyler, O.B.E. (52508), late Infantry.
- Major-General Thomas Cecil Hook Pearson, C.B.E., D.S.O. (63639), late Infantry.
- Major-General Walter Colyear Walker, C.B.E., D.S.O. (380258), late Gurkha Rifles.
- Air Vice-Marshal Robert Norman Bateson, D.S.O., D.F.C., Royal Air Force.
- Air Vice-Marshal Sidney Weetman Rochford Hughes, C.B.E., A.F.C., Royal Air Force.
- Air Vice-Marshal Thomas William Piper, C.B.E., A.F.C., Royal Air Force.
- Air Vice-Marshal Roy Scoggins, C.B.E., Q.H.D.S., L.D.S.R.C.S., Royal Air Force.
- Air Commodore Frederic Osborne Storey Dobell, C.B.E., Royal Air Force.
- Air Commodore Aeneas Ranald Donald Macdonnell, D.F.C., Royal Air Force.
- Air Commodore David Malcolm Strong, A.F.C., Royal Air Force.
- Acting Air Commodore John Charles Macdonald, C.B.E., D.F.C., A.F.C., Royal Air Force.

Civil Division

- John Gladding Major Allcock, Esq., H.M. Chief Inspector of Schools, Ministry of Education.
- Denis Charles Barnes, Esq., Deputy Secretary, Ministry of Labour.
- Henry Montagu Burrows, Esq., C.B.E., Clerk Assistant, Offices of the House of Lords.
- Arthur Lucius Michael Cary, Esq., Deputy Secretary of the Cabinet.
- Brian Humphreys-Davies, Esq., Assistant Under-Secretary of State (Supply), Air Ministry.
- Charles Dunbar, Esq., Director, Fighting Vehicles Research and Development Establishment, War Office.
- Samuel Goldman, Esq., Third Secretary, H.M. Treasury.
- George Imms, Esq., Commissioner, Board of Customs and Excise.
- John Morgan Jones, Esq., C.B.E., Welsh Secretary, Ministry of Agriculture, Fisheries and Food.
- John Mordaunt Newton, Esq., Director of Personnel, General Post Office.
- Colonel Thomas Murray Niven, T.D., D.L., formerly Chairman, Territorial and Auxiliary Forces Association for the County of the City of Glasgow.
- Gerard Ryder, Esq., Solicitor to the Board of Trade.
- William Hirst Senior, Esq., Under-Secretary, Department of Agriculture and Fisheries for Scotland.
- Edward Alan Shillito, Esq., Under-Secretary, Admiralty.
- William Ferguson Stout, Esq., Permanent Secretary, Ministry of Home Affairs for Northern Ireland.

=== Order of Saint Michael and Saint George ===
==== Knight Grand Cross (GCMG) ====
- Sir Ralph Francis Alnwick Grey, K.C.M.G., K.C.V.O., O.B.E., Governor and Commander-in-Chief, British Guiana.
- Sir Roger Bentham Stevens, K.C.M.G., lately Foreign Office.

==== Knight Commander (KCMG) ====
- Hugh Carleton Greene, Esq., O.B.E., Director-General, British Broadcasting Corporation.
- Major-General Sir Rohan Delacombe, K.B.E., C.B., D.S.O., Governor of the State of Victoria.
- Mark Dalcour Tennant, Esq., C.B., C.M.G., Secretary, Central African Office.
- Andrew Graham Gilchrist, Esq., C.M.G., Her Majesty's Ambassador Extraordinary and Plenipotentiary in Djakarta.
- Anthony Edward Lambert, Esq., C.M.G., Her Majesty's Ambassador Extraordinary and Plenipotentiary in Helsinki.
- Cecil Cuthbert Parrott, Esq., C.M.G., O.B.E., Her Majesty's Ambassador Extraordinary and Plenipotentiary in Prague.

==== Companion (CMG) ====
- Brigadier Athol Earle McDonald Brown, O.B.E., Secretary-General, Anzac Agency and Regional Director for the Pacific Region, Commonwealth War Graves Commission.
- John Frederick Foster, Esq., Secretary, Association of Universities of the British Commonwealth.
- Arnold Heckle, Esq., Principal British Trade Commissioner for the Province of Quebec, Board of Trade.
- Henry Powell Groom-Johnson, Esq., C.B.E., T.D., British Council Representative in India.
- Norman Leach, Esq., Under-Secretary, Department of Technical Co-operation.
- Gordon Charles Henry Slater, Esq., C.B.E., Under-Secretary, Ministry of Labour.
- Amishadai Larson Adu, Esq., O.B.E., Secretary-General, East African Common Services Organisation.
- The Honourable John Sydney James Clancy, Senior Puisne Judge, Supreme Court of the State of New South Wales.
- Desmond John Chetwode Crawley, Esq., C.V.O., British High Commissioner in Sierra Leone.
- Alan Francis Rathbone Griffin, Esq., Administrative Officer, State of Sarawak. For public services.
- Frank George Eyre Ievers, Esq., Postmaster-General, East African Posts and Telecommunications Administration.
- Frank Downer Jackman, Esq., Commissioner of Highways and Director of Local Government, State of South Australia.
- The Honourable Kenneth James Morris, formerly Deputy Premier and Minister for Labour and Industry, State of Queensland.
- Cyril Stanley Pickard, Esq., an Assistant Under-secretary of State in the Commonwealth Relations Office.
- Ifan Charles Harold Freeman, Esq., Permanent Secretary, Nyasaland.
- John James Cowperthwaite, Esq., O.B.E., Financial Secretary, Hong Kong.
- Arthur Douglas Bruce Hamilton, Esq., Chairman, Public Service Commission, Barbados.
- Arthur Francis Watts, Esq., O.B.E., Resident Adviser and British Agent, Eastern Aden Protectorate.
- Michael Nordon Evans, Esq., Permanent Secretary, Ministry of Health and Housing, Kenya.
- Peter Made Gordon, Esq., Permanent Secretary, Ministry of Agriculture and Animal Husbandry, Kenya.
- Mervyn Colet Manby, Esq., Deputy Inspector General of Police, Kenya.
- Archibald Ralph Melville, Esq., Director of Agriculture, Kenya.
- Lieutenant-Colonel (local Colonel) William Hugh Adamson Becke, D.S.O., Military Attache, Her Majesty's Embassy, Djakarta.
- Thomas Frank Brenchley, Esq., Foreign Office.
- William Patrick Cranston, Esq., lately Counsellor (Economic), Her Majesty's Embassy, Kuwait.
- Colin Grendon Harris, Esq., Counsellor (Commercial), Her Majesty's Embassy, Tokyo.
- Sidney Horace Hebblethwaite, Esq., Counsellor, Her Majesty's Embassy, Rangoon.
- Arthur Roy Handasyde Kellas, Esq., lately Foreign Office Representative, Imperial Defence College.
- William Bernard John Ledwidge, Esq., Foreign Office.
- Crawford Murray Maclehose, Esq., M.B.E., Foreign Office.
- Maurice Oldfield, Esq., C.B.E., Counsellor, Her Majesty's Embassy, Washington.
- Andrew Alexander Steel Stark, Esq., Foreign Office.

=== Royal Victorian Order ===
==== Knight Grand Cross (GCVO) ====
- The Right Honourable Walter Turner, Viscount Monckton of Brenchley, K.C.M.G., K.C.V.O., M.C., Q.C.

==== Knight Commander (KCVO) ====
- Henry George Rushbury, Esq., C.V.O., C.B.E.

==== Commander (CVO) ====
- Henriette Alice, Mrs. Abel Smith.
- Walter Edward Avenon Bull, Esq.
- Colonel The Right Honourable John Aymer, Earl of Stair, M.B.E.
- Gordon William Stewart, Esq.

==== Member 4th Class (MVO) ====
- Wing Commander Donald Laurence Attlee, Royal Air Force.
- Herrick Bunney, Esq., B.Mus., F.R.C.O.
- Major Peter Cecil Clarke.
- Frederick Charles Gillman, Esq., O.B.E.
- Albert Charles Edward Musk, Esq.
- Superintendent Frederick Salter, M.V.O., Berkshire Constabulary.

==== Member 5th Class (MVO) ====
- Horace William Jackson, Esq.
- Jules Henry Joerin, Esq.
- Squadron Leader John Edwards M'Kenzie-Hall, Royal Air Force.
- Lieutenant-Commander Peter John Doidge Northey, Royal Navy.
- Lieutenant-Commander William Ernest Pearce, Royal Navy.
- Eric John Frederick Robinson, Esq.
- Alexander McKiddie Sievwright, Esq.

=== Order of the British Empire ===
==== Knight Grand Cross of the Order of the British Empire (GBE) ====
- General Sir Roderick McLeod, K.C.B., C.B.E., A.D.C. (General) (31581), Colonel Commandant, Royal Regiment of Artillery.

==== Dame Commander of the Order of the British Empire (DBE) ====
Military Division

Army

- Brigadier Jean Elizabeth Rivett Rivett-Drake, M.B.E., A.D.C. (234025), Women's Royal Army Corps.

Royal Air Force

- Air Commandant Veronica Margaret Ashworth, R.R.C., Q.H.N.S., Princess Mary's Royal Air Force Nursing Service.

Civil Division

- Margaret Alice, Mrs. Shepherd, C.B.E. For political services.

==== Knight Commander of the Order of the British Empire (KBE) ====
Military Division

Royal Navy

- Vice-Admiral Arthur Richard Hezlet, C.B., D.S.O., D.S.C.
- Vice-Admiral Arthur Allison Fitzroy Talbot, C.B., D.S.O.

Army

- Lieutenant-General George Charles Gordon Lennox, C.B., C.V.O., D.S.O. (39276), late Foot Guards.

Royal Air Force

- Air Vice-Marshal Donald Randell Evans, C.B., C.B.E., D.F.C., Royal Air Force.
- Air Vice-Marshal John Gerard Willsley Weston, C.B., O.B.E., Royal Air Force.

Civil Division

- The Honourable Maurice Richard Bridgeman, C.B.E., Chairman and Managing Director, British Petroleum Company, Ltd.
- Ernest Gordon Cox, Esq., T.D., Secretary, Agricultural Research Council.
- John Galway Foster, Esq., Q.C., M.P., Member of Parliament for Northwich since 1945. Parliamentary Under-Secretary of State, Commonwealth Relations Office 1951–1954. For political and public services.
- Francis Fearon Turnbull, Esq., C.B., C.I.E., Secretary, Office of the Minister for Science.

==== Commander of the Order of the British Empire (CBE) ====
Military Division

Royal Navy

- Brigadier Francis Christopher Barton, O.B.E.
- Captain Brian Seward Blanchford, Royal Navy.
- Commodore Michael Goodier Haworth, D.S.C.
- Superintendent Marion Mildred Kettlewell, Women's Royal Naval Service.
- Captain Colin Duncan Madden, M.V.O., D.S.C., Royal Navy.
- Captain Compton Patrick Norman, D.S.O., D.S.C., Royal Navy.

Army

- Brigadier Samuel Craven Chambers, O.B.E. (126093), late Corps of Royal Engineers.
- Brigadier John Clabby, O.B.E., M.R.C.V.S. (57804), late Royal Army Veterinary Corps (now retired).
- Brigadier Joseph Alexander Fitzpatrick (44892), late Royal Armoured Corps.
- Brigadier Robert Johnston, M.B. (52437), late Royal Army Medical Corps.
- Colonel (temporary) Eric Edward Lowe (303439), Royal Army Educational Corps.
- Brigadier (temporary) Allan McGill, O.B.E. (384878), Corps of Royal Electrical and Mechanical Engineers.
- Brigadier (temporary) Peter Willan Mead (52669), late Royal Regiment of Artillery.
- Brigadier James Frederick McLean Mellor, O.B.E. (67496), Corps of Royal Electrical and Mechanical Engineers.
- Major (Honorary Brigadier) Laurence Peile Molineux (138386), late Royal Regiment of Artillery (Employed List 3) (now retired).
- Colonel (acting) Sir Thomas Langdon Howland Roberts, Bt, D.L. (15388), Army Cadet Force.
- Colonel William Charles Smith, O.B.E. (186058), late Infantry.
- Brigadier John William Alfred Stares, D.S.O., O.B.E., A.D.C. (44414), late Infantry.
- Brigadier (Temporary) Thomas Raphael Warburg (73622), late Royal Corps of Signals.
- Brigadier (temporary) Reginald Henry Whitworth, M.B.E. (124539), late Foot Guards.

Royal Air Force

- Air Commodore Arthur Andrew McGregor, Royal Air Force.
- Group Captain Roy Stanley Boast, O.B.E., D.F.C., Royal Air Force.
- Group Captain Ian William Hugh Rose Cran, M.R.C.S., L.R.C.P., Royal Air Force.
- Group Captain Frank William Marius Jensen, O.B.E., D.F.C., A.F.C., Royal Air Force.
- Group Captain Walter Noel Kenyon, O.B.E., A.F.C., Royal Air Force.
- The Reverend Charles Young McGlashan, Q.H.C., Royal Air Force.
- Group Captain John Edwin Michael Mould, Royal Air Force.
- Group Captain Thomas Robert Pierce, Royal Air Force.
- Group Captain Kenneth Ritchley, A.F.C., Royal Air Force.
- Group Captain Fred Rump, O.B.E., Royal Air Force.
- Group Captain Clive King Saxelby, O.B.E., D.F.C., A.F.C., Royal Air Force.
- Group Captain Eric William Wright, D.F.C., D.F.M., Royal Air Force.

==== Officer of the Order of the British Empire (OBE) ====
Military Division

- Reverend John Kenneth Boulton-Jones, Royal Navy.
- Commander Archibald Cameron, D.S.C., Royal Navy.
- Surgeon Commander Ian Harris Colley, M.B., B.S.
- Commander Jack Brian Collins, Royal Navy.
- Captain Frederick George Evans, Royal Fleet Auxiliary.
- Commander John Scott Grove, Royal Navy.
- Commander Alexander John Frederick Hawkridge, Royal Navy.
- Major William Alexander Cameron Horsfall, Royal Marines.
- Commander Lawrence Halford Warren Ellis Luckraft, Royal Navy.
- Surgeon Commander Cyril Lawson Tait McClintock, M.R.C.S., L.R.C.P., Royal Navy.
- Commander Bryan Geoffrey O'Neill, D.S.C., Royal Navy.
- Commander George Burton Leslie Smith, Royal Navy.
- Commander Philip Reginald Spademan, Royal Navy.
- Surgeon Commander (D) William Ewart Starkey, L.D.S., Royal Navy.
- Instructor Commander Kenneth Gordon Sumnall, Royal Navy.
- Commander Stanley Hope Walker, D.S.C,. R.D., Royal Navy.

Royal Air Force

- Wing Commander Willis Alfred Appleton (52994), Royal Air Force.
- Wing Commander George Bates, D.F.C., A.F.C. (159878), Royal Air Force.
- Wing Commander Thomas Henry Blackham, D.F.C. (124922), Royal Air Force.
- Wing Commander George Blakeman (132802), Royal Air Force.
- Wing Commander Ulf Louis Burberry (152536), Royal Air Force.
- Wing Commander Jack Alfred Bush, D.F.C. (112761), Royal Air Force.
- Wing Commander John Edward Cockfield (54976), Royal Air Force.
- Wing Commander Basil Charles Amphlett Fox (31369), Royal Air Force.
- Wing Commander John Harold Jenkins (50127), Royal Air Force.
- Wing Commander George Victor Richard Jones (49455), Royal Air Force.
- Wing Commander Peter Francis King, M.R.C.S., L.R.C.P. (57629), Royal Air Force.
- Wing Commander John Brian Mahoney (53944), Royal Air Force.
- Wing Commander Kenneth Friday Massey (55721), Royal Air Force.
- Wing Commander Allen Joseph Michael Morgan (51599), Royal Air Force.
- Wing Commander John James Phipps (57633), Royal Air Force.
- Wing Commander Robert Evelyn Biddulph Pinchard (59990), Royal Air Force.
- Wing Commander Arthur Reece, D.S.O., D.F.C. A.F.C. (44128), Royal Air Force.
- Acting Wing Commander Gerald Noah Brierley, A.F.C. (502420), Royal Air Force.
- Acting Wing Commander Ralph William Fraser Sampson, D.F.C. (116753), Royal Air Force Volunteer Reserve (Training Branch).

Civil Division

- Leslie Hilton Brown
- Athelstan Sigfrid Mellersh Rendall

==== Member of the Order of the British Empire (MBE) ====
Military Division

- Lieutenant-Commander George Henry Abbott, Royal Navy.
- Lieutenant-Commander Dennis Allen Bartlett, Royal Navy.
- Lieutenant-Commander Richard Bennett, Royal Navy.
- Lieutenant-Commander David Frank Burke, Royal Navy.
- Engineer Lieutenant-Commander Albert John Clark, Royal Navy.
- Supply Lieutenant (S) Sidney Arthur Fiddy, Royal Navy.
- Lieutenant-Commander John Teague Gilhespy, Royal Navy.
- Lieutenant-Commander (SD) (Reg) Albert Edward Hardy, Royal Navy.
- Lieutenant-Commander Alan Anthony Hensher, Royal Navy.
- Captain (SD) Charles William Holloway, Royal Marines.
- Lieutenant-Commander Geoffrey Edward Humphrey Owen, Royal Naval Reserve.
- Lieutenant-Colonel Richard Evelyn Simpkin, Royal Tank Regiment.
- Lieutenant-Commander (S.C.C.) Charles Thomas Smith, Royal Naval Reserve.
- Lieutenant-Commander (SD) (O) Cyril Topliss, D.S.M., Royal Navy.
- Instructor Lieutenant-Commander Eric Robert Walker, Royal Navy.
- Squadron Leader Douglas Sidney Thorne Robertson, Royal Air Force.

==== British Empire Medal (BEM) ====
Civil Division

- Dorothea Macnee – Member, Corsham Women's Voluntary Service, mother of actor Patrick Macnee.

== Australia ==
=== Knight Bachelor ===
- Edward John Bunting, Esq., C.B.E., Secretary, Prime Minister's Department and Secretary to the Cabinet.
- Victor Marcus Coppleson, Esq., M.B., F.R.C.S., of Point Piper, New South Wales. For services to Medicine.
- Alan Harbury Mann, Esq., M.B.E., Q.C., Chief Justice of the Supreme Court of the Territory of Papua and New Guinea.
- Major-General Denzil Macarthur-Onslow, C.B.E., D.S.O., E.D., of Menangle, New South Wales. For distinguished public service.

Brigadier Charles Chambers Fowell Spry, C.B.E., D.S.O., of Canberra, Australian Capital Territory. For distinguished public service.

=== Order of the Bath ===
==== Companion (CB) ====
Military Division

- Air Vice-Marshal William Lloyd Hely, C.B.E., A.F.C., Royal Australian Air Force.

=== Order of Saint Michael and Saint George ===
==== Companion (CMG) ====
- Robert James Abercrombie, Esq., of Vaucluse, New South Wales. For services to Banking.
- Harold Grant Ferrier, Esq., of Edgecliff, New South Wales. For services to Industry.
- Philip David Philips, Esq., M.M., Q.C., Chairman, Commonwealth Grants Commission.

=== Order of the British Empire ===
==== Knight Commander of the Order of the British Empire (KBE) ====
Military Division

Army

- Lieutenant-General John Gordon Noel Wilton, C.B., C.B.E., D.S.O., Chief of the General Staff.

Civil Division

- Leonard George Holden Huxley, Esq., Vice-Chancellor, Australian National University.
- Brigadier Warren D'Arcy McDonald, C.B.E. Chairman, Commonwealth Banking Corporation.

==== Commander of the Order of the British Empire (CBE) ====
Military Division

Army

- Brigadier Sidney John Bleechmore (223), Australian Staff Corps.
- The Reverend Allen Brooke, E.D., Chaplain-General, Royal Australian Chaplains' Department.

Air Force

Group Captain Charles Frederick Read, D.F.C., A.F.C., Royal Australian Air Force.

Civil Division

- Adrian Olsson Ashton, Esq., of Mosman, New South Wales. For services to Architecture.
- Thomas Kingston Critchley, Esq., High Commissioner for the Commonwealth of Australia in Kuala Lumpur.
- Captain John King Davis, of Melbourne, Victoria. For services to Antarctic research.
- Francis Phillip O'Grady, Esq., Director-General, Postmaster-General's Department.
- Godfrey Alfred Rattigan, Esq., O.B.E., Chairman, Australian Tariff Board.
- Basil Edward Fairfax-Ross, Esq., Member of the Legislative Council of the Territory of Papua and New Guinea.
- Keith Charles Owen Shann, Esq., Her Majesty's Australian Ambassador Extraordinary and Plenipotentiary in Djakarta.
- Paul Burcher Those, Esq., Q.C., of Warrawee, New South Wales. For services to the legal profession.

==== Officer of the Order of the British Empire (OBE) ====
Military Division

Navy

- Chief Officer Joan Streeter, Director, Women's Royal Australian Naval Service.

Army

- Lieutenant-Colonel Sydney Richardson Birch (337509), Australian Staff Corps.
- Colonel Edward Francis Campbell, E.D. (57500), Australian Army Psychology Corps.
- Lieutenant-Colonel Keith Vincent Rossi (352046), Royal Australian Artillery.

Air Force

- Wing Commander William Clement Blakeley (03304), Royal Australian Air Force.
- Wing Commander (now Acting Group Captain) David William McCarthy (05808), Royal Australian Air Force.

Civil Division

- Miss Annie Hayes Berry, M.B., Ch.B., Superintendent, Mackay Base Hospital, Queensland.
- Thomas Louis Bull, Esq., of Narrandera, New South Wales. For services to primary industry.
- Nathaniel Charles Hargrave, Esq., of Alice Springs, Northern Territory. For public services.
- Lloyd Howard Heaslip, Esq., President of the Australian Wool and Meat Producers' Federation, 1960-62.
- The Reverend William John Hobbin, Director, Social Service Department, Methodist Church of Australia.
- William Henry Lempriere, Esq., of Toorak, Victoria. For services to the Australian wool industry.
- Miss Eileen Gertrude Lenihan, M.B.E., Liaison Officer, Prime Minister's Department, Melbourne.
- The Reverend James Frederick McKay, M.B.E., Superintendent, Australian Inland Mission of the Presbyterian Church.
- The Reverend Brother Michael Maximus O'Connor, Headmaster, Christian Brothers College, Waverley, New South Wales.
- Frederick Louis Paul, Esq., of Bondi, New South Wales. For services to the meat industry in Australia.
- Miss Joan Janet Refshauge, M.B., Assistant Director (Infant, Child and Maternal Health), Department of Public Health, Port Moresby.
- William Joseph Roberts, Esq., Deputy Crown Solicitor, Brisbane, Queensland. For public services.
- Alexander Cecil Sellars, Esq., J.P., of Albury, New South Wales. For services to youth and the community.
- Ian Howe Seppelt, Esq., of Tanunda, South Australia. For services to the wine industry.
- Bertha Chatto St. George Mac, Mrs. Smith, of Orange, New South Wales. For services. to the community, particularly as National President of the Country Women's Association.
- The Reverend David Eric Ure, Superintendent, London Missionary Society, Papua and New Guinea.
- John Noble Walker, Esq., of Burwood Heights, New South Wales. For services to manufacturing industries in Australia.

==== Member of the Order of the British Empire (MBE) ====
Military Division

Navy

- Electrical Lieutenant-Commander (SD) Albert Henry Herman, Royal Australian Navy.
- Lieutenant-Commander John Alexander Matthew, Royal Australian Navy.
- Lieutenant-Commander (SD) Edward Flowers Wilkinson, Royal Australian Navy.

Army

- 2914 Warrant Officer Class I Noel Ambrose Livermore, Royal Australian Army Ordnance Corps.
- Major David Hardy Playfair (257652), Royal Australian Infantry Corps.
- Major Allan William Power (237566), Australian Staff Corps.
- 4172 Warrant Officer Class I Albert James Ryan, Royal Australian Infantry Corps.
- 19719 Warrant Officer Class II Reginald Arthur Toomey, Royal Australian Army Service Corps.
- Lieutenant (Honorary Captain) Benjamin Wade (NX700331), Royal Australian Engineers.
- 520621 Warrant Officer Class II William Ramsay Wilson, Royal Australian Infantry Corps.

Air Force

- Flight Lieutenant Keith James Taylor (0218723), Royal Australian Air Force.
- Warrant Officer Reginald Kevin Hart (A1579), Royal Australian Air Force.
- Warrant Officer Percy Hugh White (A3965), Royal Australian Air Force.

Civil Division

- Margaret Adele, Mrs. Alldrift, of Point Piper, New South Wales. For charitable services.
- Wilfred Asten, Esq., Federal President and former Secretary of the United Nations Association. For public services.
- Harold Edward Boon, Esq., President of the Westbury (Tasmania) Sub-Branch of the Re- turned Sailors', Soldiers' and Airmen's Imperial League of Australia.
- Hector George Campbell, Esq., Mayor of Deniliquin, New South Wales.
- Gwynneth Jeannie, Mrs. Cassidy, of Rose Bay, New South Wales. For public services.
- Beryl, Mrs. Collins, of Wodonga, Victoria. For services to the community.
- George Campbell Curlewis, Esq., J.P., of Cottesloe, Western Australia. For community and welfare services.
- Gladys Evelyn, Mrs. Curtis, J.P., of Ballarat, Victoria. For services to the community.
- Alan Keith Davidson, Esq., of Strathfield, New South Wales. For services to Cricket.
- John Joseph Doyle, Esq., Assistant Director, Pharmaceutical Services, Department of Health, Canberra.
- The Very Reverend Father Anthony Glynn. For services in charge of the Catholic Mission, Nara City, Japan.
- Ernest Carfrae Graham, Esq., Senior Inspector, Warehouse Branch, Department of Trade and Customs, Sydney.
- Robert Neil Harvey, Esq., of Killara, New South Wales. For services to Cricket.
- Laura Ellen, Mrs. Henry, of Newcastle, New South Wales. For services in connection with the welfare of handicapped children.
- Philip Baden Howell, Esq., J.P., of Oberon, New South Wales. For services to the community.
- Peter Cyrus Frederick Lawrence, Esq., lately Senior Technical Adviser to the Chief Migration Officer, Australian High Commission, London.
- Amena, Mrs. Middlemiss, of Milson's Point, New South Wales. For charitable services.
- Louise Playford, Mrs. Officer, of Hobart, Tasmania. For services to community associations.
- Michael Theodosios Paspalis, Esq., of Darwin, Northern Territory. For charitable and community services.
- Roy Villiers Garthorne Pearson, Esq., of Ingham, Queensland. For services in the interests of ex-servicemen.
- Lucy Frances Harvey, Mrs. Rees, of Reid, Australian Capital Territory. For services to literature.
- Jack Alfred Rolfe, Esq., of Greenmount, Western Australia. For services in connection with the welfare of ex-servicemen.
- Miss Dorothy Roseby, Secretary, Royal Australian College of Physicians.
- Edward Peter Sim, Esq., Assistant Director, Engineering Division, Postmaster-General's Department.
- Miss Lorna Discombe Sparrow, Principal, St. Anne's Church of England Girls' Grammar School, Sale, Victoria.
- Richard Minchin Ure, Esq., Chief Designing Architect, Department of Works, Melbourne.
- Walter Vinicombe, Esq., Assistant Commissioner (Appeals), Repatriation Commission, Melbourne.
- Kenneth Walter Watson, Esq., Honorary Secretary of the Surf Life Saving Association of Australia.

=== British Empire Medal (BEM) ===
Military Division

Navy

- Chief Petty Officer Lionel Thomas Farther, R.I9747, Royal Australian Navy.
- Leading Radio Electrical Mechanic Peter Wilhelmus Maria Griffioen, R.53288, Royal Australian Navy.
- Chief Petty Officer Oriel George Ramsay, F.2791, Royal Australian Naval Reserve.

Army

- 13519 Corporal Keith Bryant, Royal Australian Infantry Corps.
- 52978 Sapper Bruce Cockburn, Royal Australian Survey Corps.
- 28730 Sergeant (temporary) Thomas Ernest Keegan., Royal Australian Infantry Corps.
- 42685 Sapper Franc Jakob Kuslav (42685), Royal Australian Engineers.
- 28504 Staff-Sergeant Leslie James Scott, Royal Australian Engineers.
- 27914 Staff-Sergeant (temporary) Mervyn Thomas, Royal Australian Infantry Corps.

Air Force

- A.42005 Flight Sergeant (Now Acting Warrant Officer) Noel Lynam Cutting, Royal Australian Air Force.
- A.1314 Flight Sergeant Rowland Francis Maxwell, Royal Australian Air Force.
- A.41008 Corporal Murray Dean Hentschke, Royal Australian Air Force.

Civil Division

- Roy Thomas Bedford, Inspector (Radio Line Plant), Postmaster General's Department.
- Robert Prentice Christie, Foreman Painter, Joint House Department, Parliament House, Canberra.
- Ormond Erskin Cooper, Supervising Technician, Paddington Terminal, Overseas Telecommunications Commission.
- George Frederick Davis, Servicing Supervisor, Trans Australian Airways, Sydney.
- Ernest Mayo Florence, Engineer Class 2, Royal Australian Navy Torpedo Establishment, Sydney.
- Thomas William Goford, lately Supervising Technician (Radio), Department of Civil Aviation, Alice Springs.
- Walter James Martin, Plant Operator, Snowy Mountains Hydro-Electric Authority.
- Miss Sheila Ellen Rafferty, Typist-in-Charge, Department of Immigration.
- David Thomas Smedley, Senior Works Super- visor, Snowy Mountains Authority.
- John Sydney Sullivan, M.M., Foreman Storehouseman, Royal Edward Victualling Yard, New South Wales.
- Richard Neil Towns. For service with the Department of the Navy.
- George Albert Westcott, Commonwealth Gazette Officer, Prime Minister's Department
- Stanley William Wright, Supervising Technician (Construction), Overseas Telecommunications Commission.

=== Royal Red Cross (RRC) ===
Associate, Second Class

- Major Bridget Mary Guilfoyle (F.11), Royal Australian Army Nursing Corps.

Associate, Second Class

- Squadron Officer Margaret Jean Moloney (N.33308), Royal Australian Air Force Nursing Service.

==== Air Force Cross (AFC) ====
- Wing Commander Cyril Arthur Greenwood, O.B.E. (03110), Royal Australian Air Force.
- Acting Wing Commander Raymond Alfred Scott (022143), Royal Australian Air Force.
- Squadron Leader Hartley Vivian Shearn, D.F.C. (05974), Royal Australian Air Force.
- Flight Lieutenant John Francis Mayne (033709), Royal Australian Air Force.

=== Queen's Commendation for Valuable in the Air ===
- Flight Lieutenant Donald Edward Neil Hampton (032557), Royal Australian Air Force.
- Flight Lieutenant Robert Andrew Macintosh (037576), Royal Australian Air Force.
- Flight Lieutenant William Murray Massey (036135), Royal Australian Air Force.
- Flight Lieutenant Zane Samuel Henry Sampson (024506), Royal Australian Air Force.
- Lieutenant Winston Percival James, Royal Australian Navy.

== Nigeria ==
=== Order of Saint Michael and Saint George ===
==== Companion (CMG) ====
- Jack Bracher Davies, Esq., O.B.E. For public services.
- Ian Keith Mackay, Esq., Director-General, Nigerian Broadcasting Corporation.

=== Order of the British Empire ===
==== Knight Commander of the Order of the British Empire (KBE) ====
Civil Division

- Francis Edmund Turton-Hart, Esq., M.B.E. For public services.

==== Commander of the Order of the British Empire (CBE) ====
Civil Division

- Jack Farrington, Esq. For services to the tin mining industry.
- James Aloysius Noonan, Esq., Dean of Faculty of Arts, University of Nigeria, Nsukka.

==== Officer of the Order of the British Empire (OBE) ====
Military Division

Army

- Lieutenant-Colonel William Whitson Etches, M.C. (112866), The Royal Warwickshire Regiment; formerly on loan to the Government of the Federation of Nigeria.

Civil Division

- John William Farmsworth, Esq., M.B.E. For services to sport.
- Agnes Leopoldina, Mrs. George, M.B.E., Chief Nursing Officer.
- Courtenay Giles Bartholomew Gidley, Esq., lately Commissioner of Police.
- Eric Charles Philip Glaisher, Esq., Deputy Commissioner of Police.
- Thomas Graham, Esq., Administrative Officer, Class I.
- Stanley Arthur Hatfield, E s q., Assistant Engineer-in-Chief.
- John Ashley Jones, Esq., Deputy Permanent Secretary, Ministry of Works and Surveys.
- Samuel George Leigh-Morgan, Esq., lately Territorial Controller, Northern Territory, Posts and Telecommunications Department.
- Gerard Parker, Esq., House Governor, University College Hospital, Lagos.
- Villiers Barcham Vaughan Powell, Esq., M.B.E., lately Secretary, National Sports Council.

==== Member of the Order of the British Empire (MBE) ====
Military Division

Navy

- Lieutenant-Commander Reuben James Rate, Royal Nigerian Navy

Army

- Major (temporary) Jack Aspen (370978), The Loyal Regiment (North Lancashire); on loan to the Government of the Federation of Nigeria.
- Major George Robert Delaval Beart (393069), 14th/20th King's Hussars, Royal Armoured Corps; formerly on loan to the Government of the Federation of Nigeria.
- 2549120 Warrant Officer Class I (acting) Raymond Ryan, Corps of Royal Electrical and Mechanical Engineers; on loan to the Government of the Federation of Nigeria.

Civil Division

- Miss Gladys Asquith, Senior Matron, Nigerian Nursing Service.
- William James Thomas Barham, Esq., Assistant Works Manager, Ministry of Works and Surveys.
- Leslie Bingham, Esq., Quantity Surveyor, Ministry of Works and Surveys.
- Eric Raymond Brookes, Esq., Senior Works Superintendent, Northern Region, Ministry of Works and Surveys.
- Robert Fenton Christie, Esq., Headquarters Officer, St. John's Ambulance Brigade.
- James Mortimer Durward, Esq., Senior Executive Engineer, Ministry of Works and Surveys.
- Miss Mary Elizabeth Emery, Personal Secretary to the Governor-General.
- Kenneth John Grisman, Esq., Principal Industrial Officer, Lagos.
- Owen Gwilym Hughes, Esq., Senior Superintendent of Prisons.
- George Sydney Ingram, Esq., Stores Instructor, Ministry of Works and Surveys.
- Miss Cecily Beatrice Etty-Leal, Administrative Officer, Class I.
- Miss Phoebe Charlotte Lewsey. For charitable services in Kaduna.
- Samuel Roy Marsh, Esq., Maintenance Superintendent, Ministry of Health.
- Albert Martin, Esq., Assistant Works Manager, Lagos Works Organisation.
- Daniel McFarlane Montgomerie, Esq., Senior Meteorologist, Nigerian Meteorological Service.
- Thomas White Niblett, Esq., Principal Graphic Arts Officer, Ministry of Information.
- Wilfred Leonard Rayner, Esq., Chief Stores Officer, Ministry of Works and Surveys.
- James Whalley, Esq., Senior Assistant Secretary, Ministry of Works and Surveys.

=== British Empire Medal (BEM) ===
Military Division

Army

- 14474153 Sergeant Donald Charles Adby, Corps of Royal Electrical and Mechanical Engineers; formerly serving with the Royal Nigerian Army.
- 23473792 Staff-Sergeant Ronald Sydney William Riggs, Royal Corps of Signals; serving with the Royal Nigerian Army.

Civil Division

- Usman Doba, Sergeant Major, Nigeria Police Force.
