= Henry Hardman =

English civil servant

Sir Henry Hardman, KCB (15 December 1905 – 17 January 2001) was an English civil servant and, briefly, an academic economist.

== Early life ==
Hardman was born in December 1905, the son of Harry Hardman of Old Trafford, Manchester, and Bertha Cook Hardman. He was educated at Manchester Central High School and read Commerce at the University of Manchester, graduating in 1927. He taught for the Workers’ Educational Association from 1929 until 1934 when he was appointed an economics tutor at the University of Leeds.

== Civil Service career ==
After the outbreak of the Second World War, Hardman was drafted into the civil service in 1940 and served in the Ministry of Food. He was Deputy Head of the British Food Mission in Washington, DC (1946–48) and was the Minister of the UK's Permanent Delegations in Paris from 1953 to 1955. When the Ministry of Food merged with the Ministry of Agriculture and Fisheries in 1955, he transferred to the new Ministry of Agriculture, Fisheries and Food. He moved to the Ministry of Aviation in 1960 and was its Permanent Secretary from 1961 to 1963. He was then Permanent Secretary of the Ministry of Defence (MoD) from 1963 to 1966, overseeing the merger of the former service departments into the MoD.

== Post-retirement ==
After retiring, Hardman was chairman of the Home Grown Cereals' Authority (1968–77) and the Covent Garden Market Authority (1967–75), managing the market's move to Nine Elms, and he served on the Monopolies and Mergers Commission (1967–70; as deputy chairman until 1968). He acted as negotiator for a Post Office pay agreement in 1971.

== Marriage and children ==
Hardman married Helen Diana Bosanquet. They had one son and two daughters.

== Honours ==
Hardman was made a Companion of the Most Honourable Order of the Bath (CB) on 2 January 1956, and later advanced to be Knight Commander of the Order of the Bath (KCB).

Hardman received an honorary LLD from the University of Manchester in 1965.

== Death ==
Hardman died in January 2001, aged 95.

Government offices
Preceded by Sir William Strath	Permanent Secretary of the Ministry of Aviation; 1961–1963	Succeeded by Sir Richard Way
Preceded by Sir Robert Heatlie Scott (as Permanent Secretary, Ministry of Defence) Sir Arthur Drew (as Permanent Secretary, War Office); Sir Clifford Jarrett (as Permanent Secretary, Admiralty); Sir Martin Flett (as Permanent Secretary, Air Ministry)	Permanent Secretary of the Ministry of Defence; 1963–1966	Succeeded by Sir James Dunnett
