= Richard Mottram =

British civil servant

Sir Richard Mottram GCB
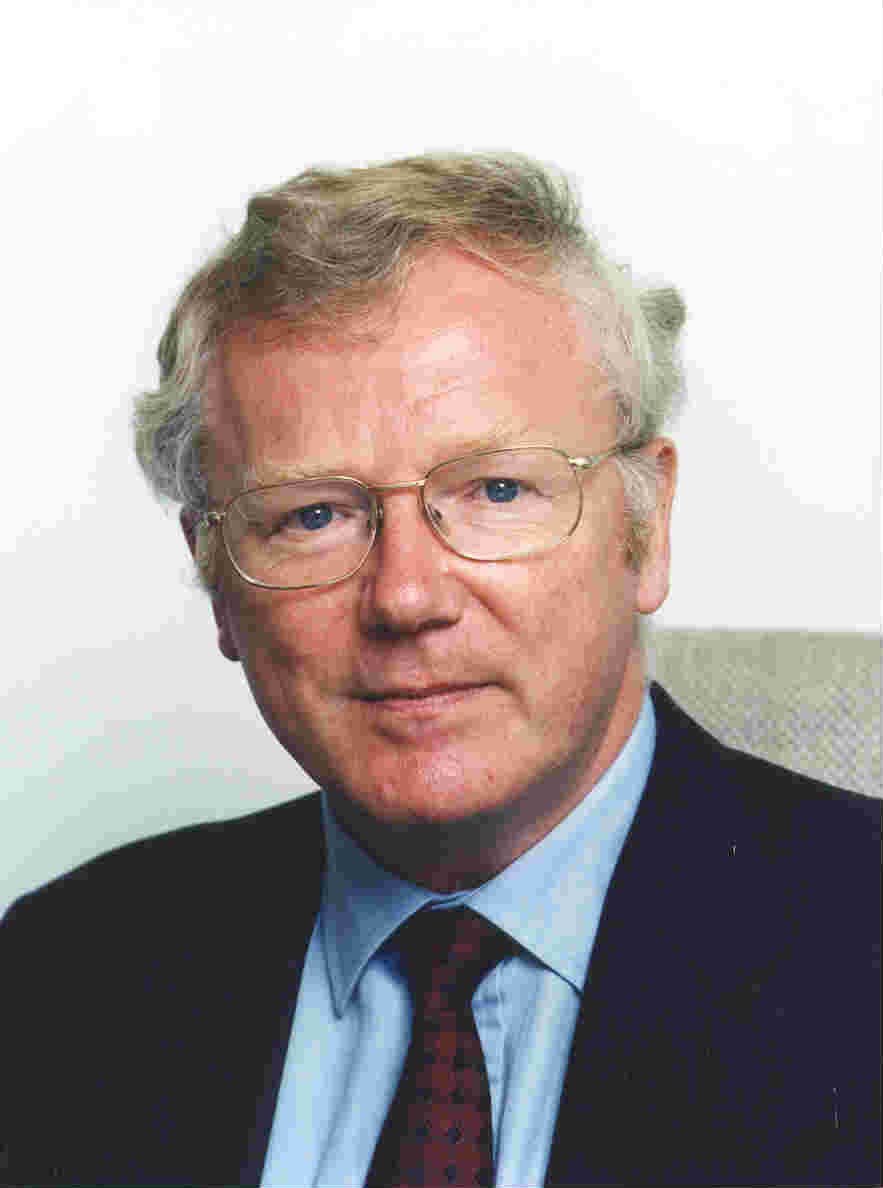
- Official portrait, c. 2000
- Born: Richard Clive Mottram; 23 April 1946 (age 80)
- Education: Keele University
- Occupation: Chairman of Amey
- Known for: British civil servant

Sir Richard Clive Mottram GCB (born 23 April 1946) is a former British civil servant, who retired in 2007 from his most recent senior post as Permanent Secretary, Intelligence, Security and Resilience in the Cabinet Office.

He has served on the boards of a number of private and public sector organisations, including chairing the boards of Amey from 2008-17 and of the Defence Science and Technology Laboratory (DSTL) from 2008-2014. He was a Governor of the Ditchley Foundation from 1996-2019 and served on its Council of Management. He was a visiting professor in the department of government at the London School of Economics and Political Science (LSE) from 2008-21. He is chair of the advisory board of the LSE's foreign policy think tank (LSE IDEAS) and lectures on its Executive Masters course and other LSE courses. He is a trustee of the Royal Anniversary Trust, which oversees The Queen's Anniversary Prizes for Higher and Further Education.

== Education and early career ==
Mottram was educated at King Edward VI Camp Hill School in Birmingham. He entered the central government civil service in 1968 aged 22 with a first class degree in International relations from Keele University. From 1975 until 1977, he served in the Defence and Overseas Secretariat of the Cabinet Office. He was then the secretary of two study groups on the rationale for and system options for a successor to the UK's strategic nuclear deterrent which led subsequently to the decision to adopt Trident. He was then appointed private secretary to the permanent under secretary, MOD: Frank Cooper. From 1982 to 1986, he was private secretary to a succession of Secretaries of State for Defence - John Nott, Michael Heseltine and the late George Younger. He was Heseltine's Private Secretary at the time of his resignation in 1986 over the Westland affair.

In 1985, as private secretary to Michael Heseltine, the Secretary of State at the Ministry of Defence, he was a witness for the prosecution in the trial of Clive Ponting, who was later acquitted of an offence under section 2 of the Official Secrets Act 1911 for passing information to Labour MP Tam Dalyell about the sinking of the Belgrano during the Falklands War. When asked whether answers to parliamentary questions should be truthful and not deliberately ambiguous or misleading, there was a long silence before he replied: "In highly charged political matters, one person's ambiguity may be another person's truth".

From 1986 to 1989, he was the Under-secretary responsible for the defence programme, and from 1989 to 1992, the Deputy Secretary with responsibilities for UK defence policy and strategy, and defence relations with other countries at the time of the end of the Cold War. He was the architect of the "Options for Change' Defence Review.

== Multi-purpose Permanent Secretary ==
After this, in 1992, he was appointed as a Permanent Secretary, first at the Office of Public Service and Science in the Cabinet Office. His responsibilities there included public service change, Civil Service management questions, and science and technology policy and the science budget.

In 1995, he became Permanent Secretary of the Ministry of Defence, where he worked on, among other things, the Labour Government's Strategic Defence Review.

In 1998, he became permanent secretary at the Department for the Environment, Transport and the Regions. Mottram's tenure at DETR saw important developments in environmental policy and the publication of White papers on Urban and rural policy. A 10-year transport plan was developed building on the 1998 White paper on Integrated transport. One aspect of transport — railways — tended to dominate in the media. New institutional arrangements were introduced with a Strategic Rail Authority alongside the Rail Regulator but the appointments by John Prescott of Sir Alastair Morton as chairman of the Strategic Rail Authority and Tom Winsor as Rail Regulator proved an unhappy partnership, which ended in 2001 when Morton resigned and was replaced by Richard Bowker. Mottram's term also saw the rail crashes at Ladbroke Grove, Hatfield and Potters Bar. The national railway infrastructure company Railtrack got into serious financial difficulties after the Hatfield rail crash in October 2000, and on 7 October 2001 was put into administration on the petition of the Secretary of State for Transport, Local Government and the Regions Stephen Byers MP in very controversial circumstances. Mottram was closely involved in the preparations for the administration of Railtrack and in July 2005 was called as a witness in the largest class legal action ever brought in the English courts, when 49,500 shareholders of Railtrack sued the Secretary of State for Transport for damages for misfeasance in public office. The case was lost because the shareholders could not prove targeted malice on the part of Stephen Byers, that is an intention maliciously to injure the shareholders. Mottram's evidence was not contested by the claimants. In his summing up the judge referred to him as a "direct, accurate and truthful" witness.

On 11 September 2001, after both World Trade Center towers and the Pentagon were hit in the day's terrorist attacks, a special advisor in Mottram's department, Jo Moore, sent an email to the press office of her department which read: "It's now a very good day to get out anything we want to bury. Councillors' expenses?" The suggestion caused severe criticism for its insensitivity, callousness and political ineptitude. As the administrative head of the department in which Moore worked, Mottram was asked by Stephen Byers to consider whether disciplinary action should be taken against Moore.

Mottram was still at the DETR in 2002 when, after further controversy over alleged "burying of bad news" involving Moore and Martin Sixsmith, the department's Director of Communications, Stephen Byers announced that both Moore and Sixsmith had decided to resign. Mottram was in the middle of negotiations with Sixsmith at the time of the Byers announcement. According to Sixsmith, Mottram said to a colleague as Byers headed to the interview studios:

We're all fucked. I'm fucked. You're fucked. The whole department is fucked. It's the biggest cock-up ever. We're all completely fucked.

After Sixmith included this quote in an interview with the Sunday Times about his "resignation" it was picked up extensively in the media and tended to be reported in bowdlerised form as "f***ed", leading Tony Wright, the Chairman of the Public Administration Committee at the time, to comment to Mottram that "Our note-takers have trouble with asterisks."

Sir Richard was embarrassed by the report of his remarks, and was asked about them by the House of Commons Public Administration Committee on 7 March 2002. In response, he said: "I find the subject of the remarks I am alleged to have made with the asterisks one of the most tedious subjects I have ever had to deal with ... What is actually the case is that much to my regret, actually, these remarks appeared in the newspapers, they were uttered in private to one person, with one other person in the room and they were quite clearly over the top in a number of respects, not least in describing the nature of the crisis we were engulfed in. In previous incarnations I have dealt with life and death matters where lots of people lives were at risk. I have been responsible for things to do with nuclear warfare and whatever one thinks about the events of that Friday they are not in that category. I much regret the thing was so over-hyped."

Sir Richard has worked closely with a large number of Ministers and took the impartiality and professionalism of the civil service very seriously. His efforts to communicate the nature of this relationship were not, however, always successful. In his oral evidence to the House of Commons Public Administration Committee on 7 March 2002, he said

... one of the interesting things about the Civil Service, which I do not think Ministers understand sufficiently clearly, despite our efforts constantly to tell them, is that it is a fantastically loyal institution to Ministers. What the Civil Service wants, and I always compare it to a rather stupid dog, it wants to do what its master wants and it wants to be loyal to its master and above all it wants to be loved for doing that and I am not sure Ministers understand that. When I said "stupid dog", of course I meant a superbly well-educated dog, particularly those brought up in Nissen huts.

He later said that he realised that this analogy was a "tremendous mistake".

In May 2002, as Stephen Byers resigned as secretary of state, Mottram was moved to the Department for Work and Pensions (DWP) as permanent secretary. In his time at DWP, a number of innovative policies were introduced on welfare to work and pensions and the department agreed to achieve staff reductions of 40,000 posts against a starting point of 130,000 staff (full-time equivalents), much the largest efficiency-related staff saving within central government. By the time Mottram left DWP, implementation of this saving was well underway.

Sir Richard moved to a strategic position at the Cabinet Office on 11 November 2005 as Security and Intelligence Co-ordinator (still as a permanent secretary and also as a safe pair of hands with wide experience across government). He succeeded Bill Jeffrey. He also took on the role of chairman of the Joint Intelligence Committee. His post was subsequently retitled as Permanent Secretary Intelligence, Security, and Resilience, Cabinet Office. In this role he acted as the accounting officer for the Single Intelligence Account, from which the three Security and Intelligence Agencies are funded. He also acted as deputy chair of the Civil Contingencies Committee, supporting the prime minister, home secretary and other ministers in their role as chair and, in the event of any serious incident requiring central government coordination, acting as the Government's senior crisis manager. He was also responsible for co-ordination of the Government's counter-terrorism policy and programmes.

He was made chair of the Joint Intelligence Committee at time when the credibility of the organisation needed to be re-established after intelligence reports were apparently "sexed-up" for PR purposes during the chairmanship of John Scarlett. The JIC's role had come under scrutiny in the review of the information about weapons of mass destruction in Iraq and the Hutton Inquiry into the suicide of MoD weapons expert, Dr. David Kelly.

Sir Richard retired from the Civil Service in November 2007 when the responsibilities he held were reorganised into two posts, with the Cabinet Secretary taking on the Accounting Officer role for the Intelligence Agencies.

== Other roles ==
Sir Richard served as a Board Member and then from 2002 to 2004 President of the Commonwealth Association for Public Administration and Management. He was a Board Member of Ashridge Business School from 1998- 2015.

== Styles and honours ==
Mottram was appointed a Knight Commander of the Order of the Bath (KCB) in the 1998 New Year Honours and promoted to a Knight Grand Cross of the same Order in the 2006 New Year Honours.

- Mr Richard Mottram (1946–1998)
- Sir Richard Mottram, KCB (1998–2006)
- Sir Richard Mottram, GCB (2006–present)

== Offices held ==
Government offices
Preceded by Sir Peter Kemp	Permanent Secretary of the Office of Public Service and Science, Cabinet Office; 1992–2005	Succeeded by Sir Robin Mountfield as Permanent Secretary of the Office of Public Service
Preceded by Sir Peter Kemp	Permanent Secretary of the Office of Public Service and Science, Cabinet Office; 1992–2005	Succeeded by Peter Gregson as Permanent Secretary of the Department of Trade and Industry
Preceded by Sir Christopher France	Permanent Secretary of the Ministry of Defence; 1995-1998	Succeeded by Sir Kevin Tebbit
Preceded by Sir Andrew Turnbull	Permanent Secretary of the Department for the Environment, Transport and the Regions; 1998–2002	Succeeded by Dame Mavis McDonald; Permanent Secretary of the Office of the Deputy Prime Minister
Preceded by Sir Andrew Turnbull	Permanent Secretary of the Department for the Environment, Transport and the Regions; 1998–2002	Succeeded by Rachel Lomax; Permanent Secretary of the Department for Transport
Preceded by Rachel Lomax	Permanent Secretary of the Department for Work and Pensions; 2002-2005	Succeeded by Sir Leigh Lewis
Preceded by Bill Jeffrey; Security and Intelligence Co-ordinator	Permanent Secretary, Intelligence, Security and Resilience; 2005–2007	Succeeded by Alex Allan; Chairman of the Joint Intelligence Committee; Head of Intelligence Assessment
Preceded by Sir John Scarlett; Chairman of the Joint Intelligence Committee	Permanent Secretary, Intelligence, Security and Resilience; 2005–2007	Succeeded by Robert Hannigan; Head of Security, Intelligence and Resilience
