= Richard W. B. Clarke =

British civil servant (1910–1975)

Sir Richard William Barnes Clarke, KCB, OBE (13 August 1910 – 21 June 1975), also known as Sir Otto Clarke, was a British civil servant.

== Early life and education ==
Clarke was born in Heanor, Derbyshire, the son of schoolmaster William Thomas Clarke and Helen Rodway Barnes. He was educated at Christ's Hospital, London and Clare College, Cambridge, where he was sixth wrangler in 1931. He sat the examinations of the Royal Statistical Society in 1932 and was awarded their Frances Wood Prize.

== Career ==
Clarke worked for the British Electrical and Allied Manufacturers' Association, 1932–33. He was then on the staff of the Financial News (later taken over by the Financial Times) until 1939 and devised the Ordinary Share Index, now the Financial Times Ordinary Share Index.

During World War II he served in the Ministries of Information, Economic Warfare, and Supply and Production, and with the Combined Production and Resources Board in Washington, 1942–43.

He joined the Treasury in 1945 and was its Second Permanent Secretary, 1962–66. He was then Permanent Secretary at the Ministry of Aviation in 1966, then at the Ministry of Technology until 1970, retiring from the Civil Service in 1971. From 1973, he was a Vice-President of the Royal Institution.

According to Sir Douglas Wass, Clarke was "a character you either loved and hated or hated" – although he himself stated "I loved him." Wass stated that, with the exception of Sir Leo Pliatzky, Clarke held most ministers and colleagues "in high disesteem".

== Honours ==
Richard Clarke was given the honours of OBE in 1944, Companion of the Bath in 1951, and Knight Commander of the Bath in 1964.

== Personal life ==
He was the father of politician Charles Clarke.

According to Clarke's son Mark, the nickname "Otto" was possibly because Clarke's "forceful" personality was considered Germanic. According to Sir Sam Brittan, "it was because his round glasses and the bridge over the nose looked like OTTO."

He devised the English Chess Federation (formerly British Chess Federation) Grading System, first published in 1958, whereby points are scored by chess players for every game played in a registered competition.

Government offices
Preceded by Sir Richard Way	Permanent Secretary of the Ministry of Aviation; 1966	Succeeded by Sir Ronald Melville
