= Joan Cooper (social worker) =

Joan Cooper CB
- Born: Joan Davies Cooper; 12 August 1914; Droylsden, Manchester, England
- Died: 15 January 1999 (aged 84); Brighton, East Sussex, England
- Citizenship: United Kingdom
- Education: Fairfield High School for Girls; University of Manchester
- Occupations: Civil servant; Social worker
- Years active: 1941–1999

Joan Davies Cooper CB (12 August 1914 – 15 January 1999) was an English civil servant and social worker. She joined the Derbyshire Education Department and worked with child evacuees before being appointed Assistant Director of Education. In 1948, Cooper was made Children's Officer for East Sussex and was appointed Chief Inspector of the Children's Department of the Home Office in 1965. She became a director of the DHSS Social Welfare Service at the Department of Health and Social Security in 1971 and helped to unify the service and give professional guidance and support to social service departments. A periodic series of lectures at the University of Sussex focusing on the consequences of failing to help children and society were named after her.

== Early life ==
Cooper was born into a Moravian community in Droylsden, Manchester on 12 August 1914, the start of the First World War, to area manager Valentine Holland Cooper and teacher Louisa Wynnefred Gardner. She was the oldest child in the family, and had one younger brother, Frank Cooper, a future Permanent Secretary at the Ministry of Defence. Cooper was educated at the Fairfield High School for Girls, and did a degree in arts and a teaching diploma at the University of Manchester.

== Career ==
She began taking an interest in social work by working in the slums of Ancoats. Cooper also did probation work part-time and went to Bude, Cornwall to find work as a teacher. Aged 27, she joined the Derbyshire Education Department and worked with children evacuated from their homes. In 1944, Cooper was appointed Assistant Director of Education. Following the passing of the Children Act 1948, which established children's departments in local authorities and to change the education, health and social services for children in the United Kingdom, she moved to become Children's Officer for East Sussex in 1948. In the role, Cooper toured overseas, was elected president of the Association of Children's Officers in 1954, and helped to establish the National Children's Bureau the following year.

She was appointed Chief Inspector of the Children's Department of the Home Office in 1965, which gave her the responsibility to oversee inspection of childcare services and was able to influence important developments. This included the passing of the Children and Young Persons Act 1969 to provide a rationalised attitude towards young offenders and the Local Authority Social Services Act 1970 to centralise social services into one department in every local authority. Cooper was an advisor to the television series Dad's Army. She worked with under-secretary Derek Morrell at the Community Development Project and the Inspectorate's Development Group to publish documents and reports as well as working with Youth Treatment Centres to focus on sensitive, inter-disciplinary approach to young offenders.

In 1971, Cooper became a director of the DHSS Social Welfare Service at the Department of Health and Social Security. She worked to unify the service and to give professional guidance and support to social service departments at a time of exponential growth and instability. The following year, she published a paper called The cycle of deprivation, which later became the first Joint Working Party papers. In the paper, Cooper noted deprivation had many forms and several causes, such as poverty, unemployment, lack of community facilities, inadequate housing, people's health and cultural factors. She wrote depressed, deprived or "under-functioning" families and individuals who could not have adequate management tended to gather in areas with their independent sub-cultural lifestyles, sharing behaviour patterns, and felt more secure from criticism.

Cooper retired in 1976 and did one year of training as a mature student at the National Institute for Social Work as preparation for the next phase of her life at grass roots levels. In 1979, she became an honorary research fellow at the University of Sussex. Cooper authored The Creation of the British Personal Social Services in 1983, and assisted government as chair of the Central Council for Education and Training in Social Work from 1984 to 1986, as well as Parents for Children between 1979 and 1987. In 1998, she led a group who planned the national 50th anniversary of the passing of the Children Act 1948, which was called 50 Years of Child Care 1948–1998.

== Personal life ==
According to Barbara Kahan in The Independent, she was a heavily private and kind individual who "had no time for "fudge" and shallow thinking; she looked realities straight in the eye with a remorseless intellectual approach which was sometimes uncomfortable but always valuable." She lived to travel extensively in her professional and private life, adored art galleries and opera and walking on the Sussex Downs. In 1972, Cooper was appointed CB. She died of pneumonia following a stroke on 15 January 1999, at Brighton General Hospital, Brighton. Cooper was unmarried. She was cremated at Brighton Crematorium on 26 January 1999.

== Legacy ==
The obituarist for The Times said that as a social worker Cooper "was at the heart of most major developments in the field" and relished changed and challenge in something that "has never been free from controversy" following the conclusion of the Second World War. The Department of Social Work & Social Care of the University of Sussex and East Sussex County Council set up a periodic series of lectures, the Joan Cooper Memorial Lectures, as a memorial in her name. They are given by children's welfare researchers and writers and focus on the consequences of failure to help children and society.
