= Michael Quinlan (civil servant) =

British civil servant

Sir Michael Edward Quinlan, GCB (11 August 1930 – 26 February 2009) was a former British defence strategist and former Permanent Under-Secretary of State for Defence, who wrote and lectured on defence and matters of international security, especially nuclear weapon policies and doctrine, and also on concepts of 'Just War' and related ethical issues.

== Early life ==
Quinlan was born on 11 August 1930 in Hampton, Middlesex, England to Gerald and Roseanne Quinlan. He was educated at Wimbledon College, the Jesuit boys' high school. From 1948 to 1952 he attended Merton College, Oxford, graduating with a double first in Classics. He completed his national service in the RAF between 1952 and 1954.

== Civil Service career ==
In 1954, Quinlan joined the Air Ministry as a civil servant. He was Private Secretary to two Chiefs of the Air Staff: Sir Thomas Pike from 1962 to 1963, and Sir Charles Elworthy from 1963 to 1965. From 1968 to 1970 he became Director of Defence Policy dealing with arms control issues from where he moved to become the Defence Counsellor in the UK Delegation to NATO until 73. He was Deputy Secretary (policy and programmes) at the Ministry of Defence (MoD) from 1977 to 1981. He was Permanent Secretary of the Ministry of Defence from 1988 to 1992. These years saw the end of the Cold War and the collapse of the Soviet Union.

Outside the Ministry of Defence he was Permanent Secretary, Department of Employment (1983–88); Deputy Secretary, HM Treasury (1981–82) and Under-Secretary, Cabinet Office (1974–77). He retired from the Civil Service in 1992.

== Later life ==
On retirement, Quinlan became Director of the Ditchley Foundation, holding the position until 1999. In 2001, he became Chairman of The Tablet Trust, publisher of the Catholic newspaper The Tablet.

He was one of the world's foremost experts in deterrence theory, contributing to debate and books in this field. He also wrote his own book on this matter shortly before his death. His contributions were recognised by Gordon Brown, the Prime Minister of the United Kingdom, in a speech given on 17 March 2009. Historian of government Peter Hennessy called him the leading in-house defence intellectual MOD has possessed since World War II.

He died on 26 February 2009.

== Honours ==
Quinlan as appointed a Companion of the Order of the Bath (CB) in the 1980 Birthday Honours, promoted to Knight Commander of the Order (KCB) in the 1985 New Year Honours, and again to Knight Grand Cross of the Order (GCB) in the 1991 New Year Honours.

== Personal life ==
Quinlan married Mary Finlay in 1965, with whom he had four children including actress and comedy writer Carrie Quinlan. He was a devout Roman Catholic.

== Bibliography ==
- Charles Guthrie and Michael Quinlan (2007). Just War: The Just War Tradition: Ethics in Modern Warfare. Walker. ISBN 9780802717030.
  - review: Richard Norton-Taylor (3 November 2007). "Immoral victories". The Guardian.
- Michael Quinlan (2009). Thinking About Nuclear Weapons: Principles, Problems, Prospects. Oxford University Press. ISBN 9780199563944.
- Michael Quinlan and Tanya Ogilvie-White (2011). On nuclear deterrence : the correspondence of Sir Michael Quinlan. Routledge. ISBN 9780415521659.

Government offices
Preceded by Sir Kenneth Barnes	Permanent Secretary of the Department of Employment; 1983–1988	Succeeded by Sir Geoffrey Holland
Preceded by Sir Clive Whitmore	Permanent Secretary of the Ministry of Defence; 1988-1992	Succeeded by Sir Christopher France
