= Edward Playfair =

English civil servant and businessman

Sir Edward Playfair KCB
- Born: 17 May 1909; London, England
- Died: 21 March 1999 (aged 89); London, England
- Occupations: civil servant and businessman
- Years active: 1931–1983
- Spouse: Molly Rae (m. 1941)
- Children: three daughters

Sir Edward Wilder Playfair KCB (17 May 1909 – 21 March 1999) was an English civil servant and businessman.

== Biography ==
Edward Playfair was born in London on 17 May 1909, the only child of Harriet Forester Leighton (1876–1967) and Dr Ernest Playfair (1871–1951), a physician. His grandmother Mary Leighton was a noted translator of medieval legend of Virgilius the Sorcerer for Andrew Lang's The Violet Fairy Book. He was educated at Eton College as a King's scholar and received a scholarship to attend King's College, Cambridge. He achieved a first class degree in classics and then studied history.

He started work at the UK government Inland Revenue in 1931. In 1934, he moved to the Treasury. He was involved in financing British universities at the time when the University Grants Committee received its funding directly from the Treasury.

In 1947, he worked for a year within the Control Commission for Germany in London. In the 1949 New Year Honours he was made a Companion of The Most Honourable Order of the Bath (CB). He then continued at the Treasury until 1956 when he was appointed Permanent Under-Secretary at the War Office. He was appointed a Knight Commander of the Order of the Bath (KCB) in the 1957 New Year Honours. He was Permanent Secretary at the Ministry of Defence (1960–61).

In the 1960s and 70s, he worked in business. He was the Chairman of International Computers and Tabulators (1961–65), a Director of National Westminster Bank (1961–79), and a Director of Glaxo Holdings (1961–79). During his time at ICT, he was President of the British Computer Society (1963–65). In 1966 he declared himself a "hater of St Pancras" and thus was opposed to Sir John Betjeman's campaign to save the Sir George Gilbert Scott designed Midland Grand Hotel.

Playfair became a trustee (1967–74) and for two years Chairman of the Board (1972–74) of the National Gallery in London. He was also a member of the governing bodies of Imperial College (1958–83) and University College London.

== Personal life ==
In 1941 he married Molly Rae, a doctor. Together they had three daughters. He died of cancer in London in 1999.

== Bibliography ==
- André Raffalovich, Letters to Edward Playfair, Aylesford Press, 1992. ISBN 1-869955-22-6, ISBN 1-869955-23-4.

Government offices
Preceded by Sir Richard Powell	Permanent Secretary of the Ministry of Defence; 1960–1961	Succeeded by Sir Robert Heatlie Scott
