= John Flett (geologist) =

Scottish physician and geologist

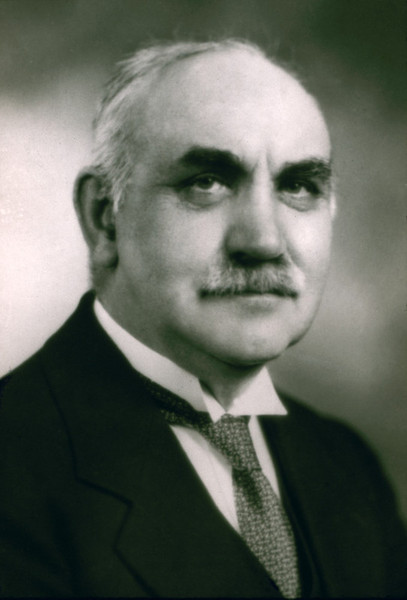
John Flett in 1935

Sir John Smith Flett KBE FRSE FRS FGS (26 June 1869 – 26 January 1947) was a Scottish physician and geologist.

== Early life ==
Born in Kirkwall, Orkney, the son of James Ferguson Flett, a merchant and baillie, and Mary Ann (née Copland). He was educated at Kirkwall Burgh School, George Watson's College in Edinburgh, and the University of Edinburgh (MA; BSc 1892; MB CM 1894; DSc 1900; LLD 1912).

Flett worked as a general practitioner for a short while after graduation, but in 1895 turned to geology for a career. He served as lecturer in Petrology at the University of Edinburgh, and as Petrographer (1901), assistant director (1911) and Director (1920–35) of the Geological Survey of Great Britain.

== Expeditions ==
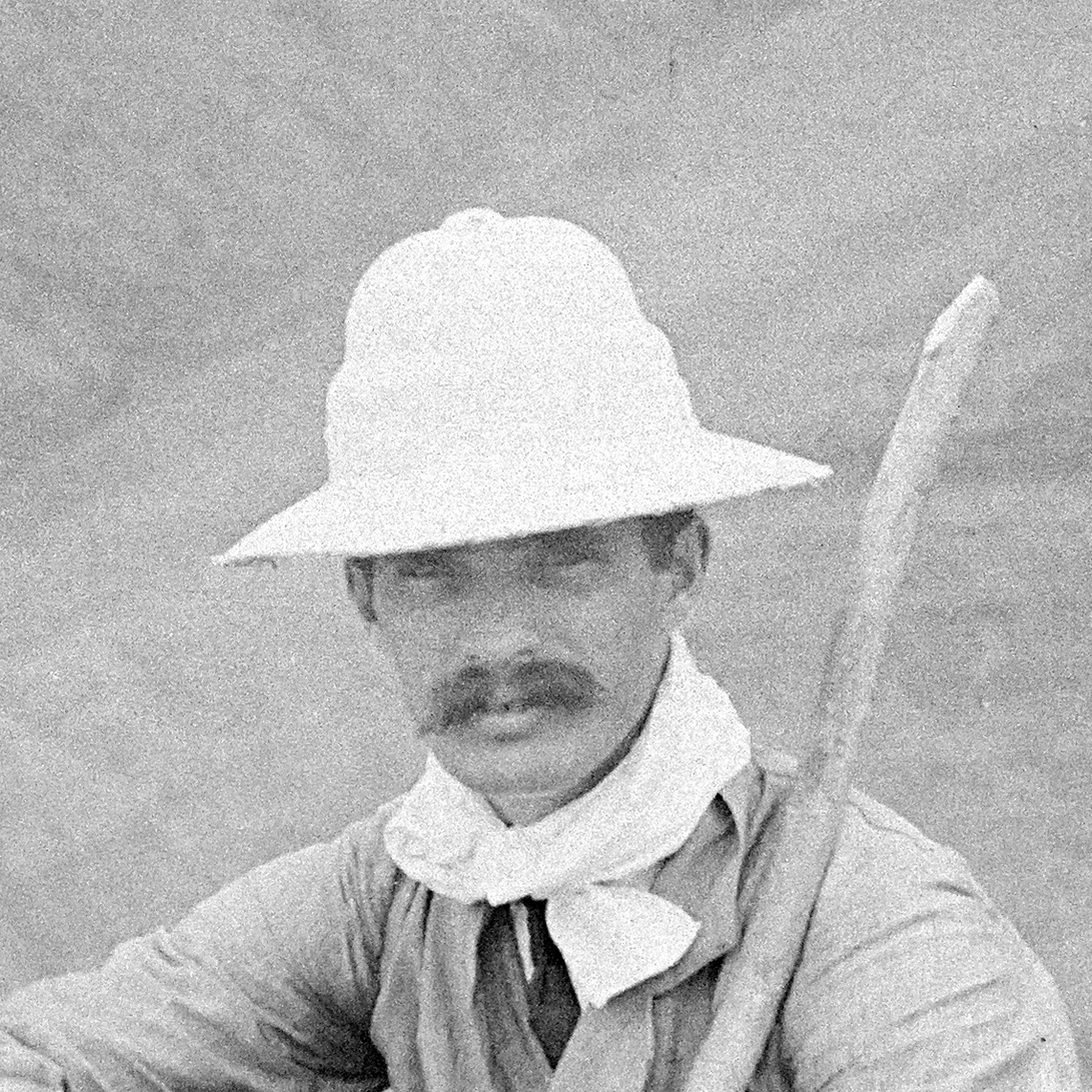
John Flett on La Soufrière, St Vincent in 1907

Flett participated in several geological expeditions. He went with Tempest Anderson to observe the aftermaths of eruptions in the Caribbean in 1902 and 1907.

== Awards and later life ==
Flett was awarded the Neill Prize (1898–1901) of the Royal Society of Edinburgh and was elected a Fellow of the Royal Society of Edinburgh in 1900, on the proposal of James Geikie, Ben Peach, John Horne and Ramsay Traquair. He was elected a Fellow of the Royal Society in 1913, received the Bolitho Medal of the Royal Geological Society of Cornwall in 1917, appointed an Officer of the Order of the British Empire (OBE) in the 1918 Birthday Honours and promoted to Knight Commander of the Order (KBE) in the 1925 Birthday Honours and won the Wollaston Medal in 1935.

Flett served as president of the Edinburgh Geological Society, president of the Mineralogical Society, and president of the geology section of the British Association (1921).

Flett died in Ashdon, Essex and his headstone in the churchyard of All Saints' Church shows his date of birth as 25 May 1869 (a month earlier than the DOB given in the ODNB). Some of Flett's papers, relating to his time as student, are held at Edinburgh University., while the British Geological Survey holds an archive of his papers and correspondence from 1902 to 1944.

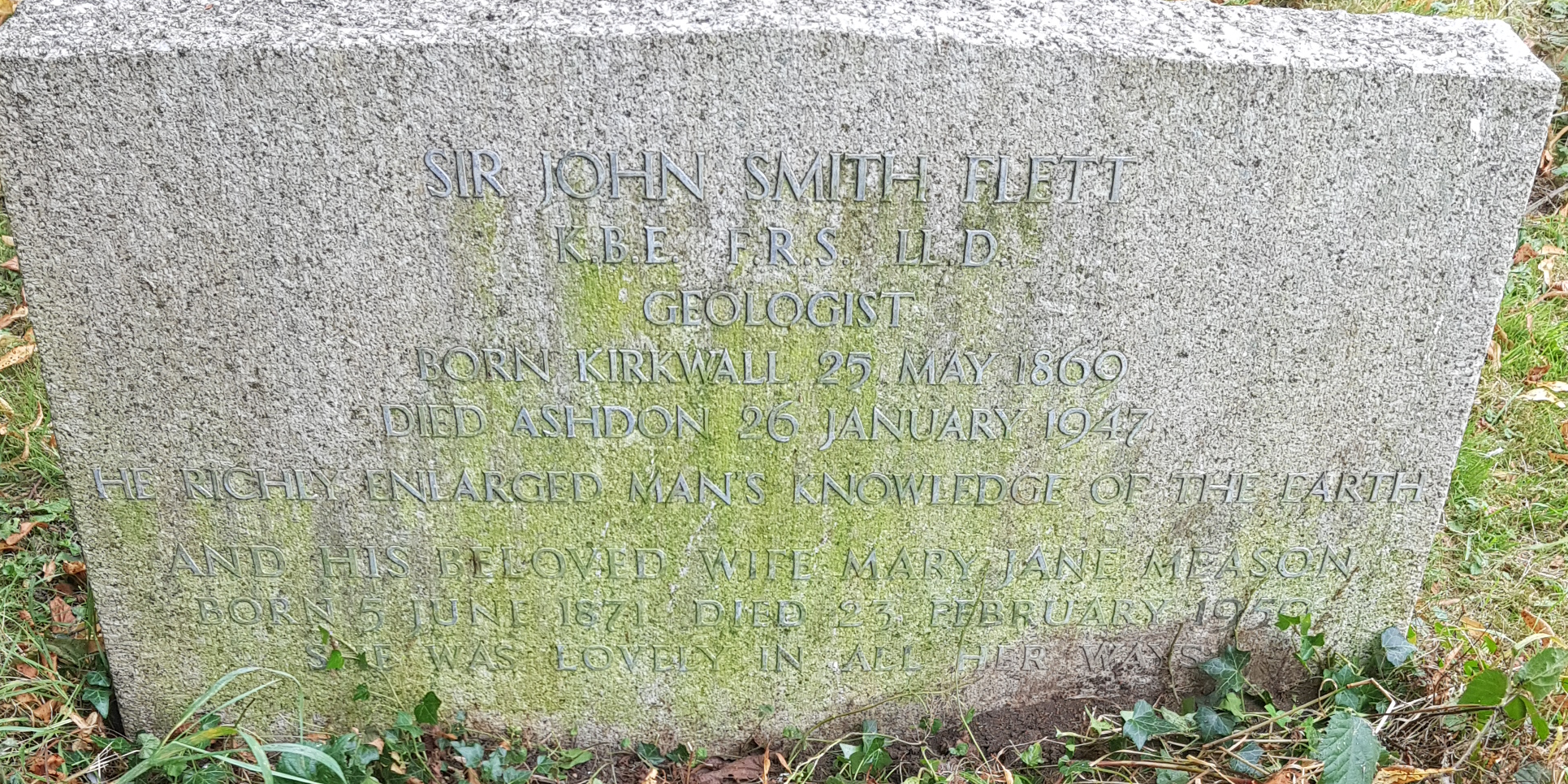
Headstone of Sir John Flett KBE, 25 May 1869 - 26 Jan 1947, All Saints Church, Ashdon, Essex

== Family ==
Flett married Mary Jane 'Polly' Meason; They had four children: Winifred Mary Flett (1899–1991), Enid Jean Flett (1903 - 1972), Harald Flett (5 Feb 1906 - 1981) and Sir Martin Teall Flett (30 July 1911 - 25 Feb 1982).

His granddaughter, the journalist Scarth Flett, was married to the Australian journalist, writer, scholar, and documentary filmmaker John Pilger.

== Recognition ==
In the mid-1970s, the then new, glass-faced structure built in the grounds of the South Kensington Museums complex between the Geological Museum and the British Museum (Natural History) containing a lecture theatre, was named in his honour.

Staff from BAS who were surveying in the Shackleton Range named Flett Crags in Antarctica after Sir John Smith Flett.
