= Robert Heatlie Scott =

British civil servant

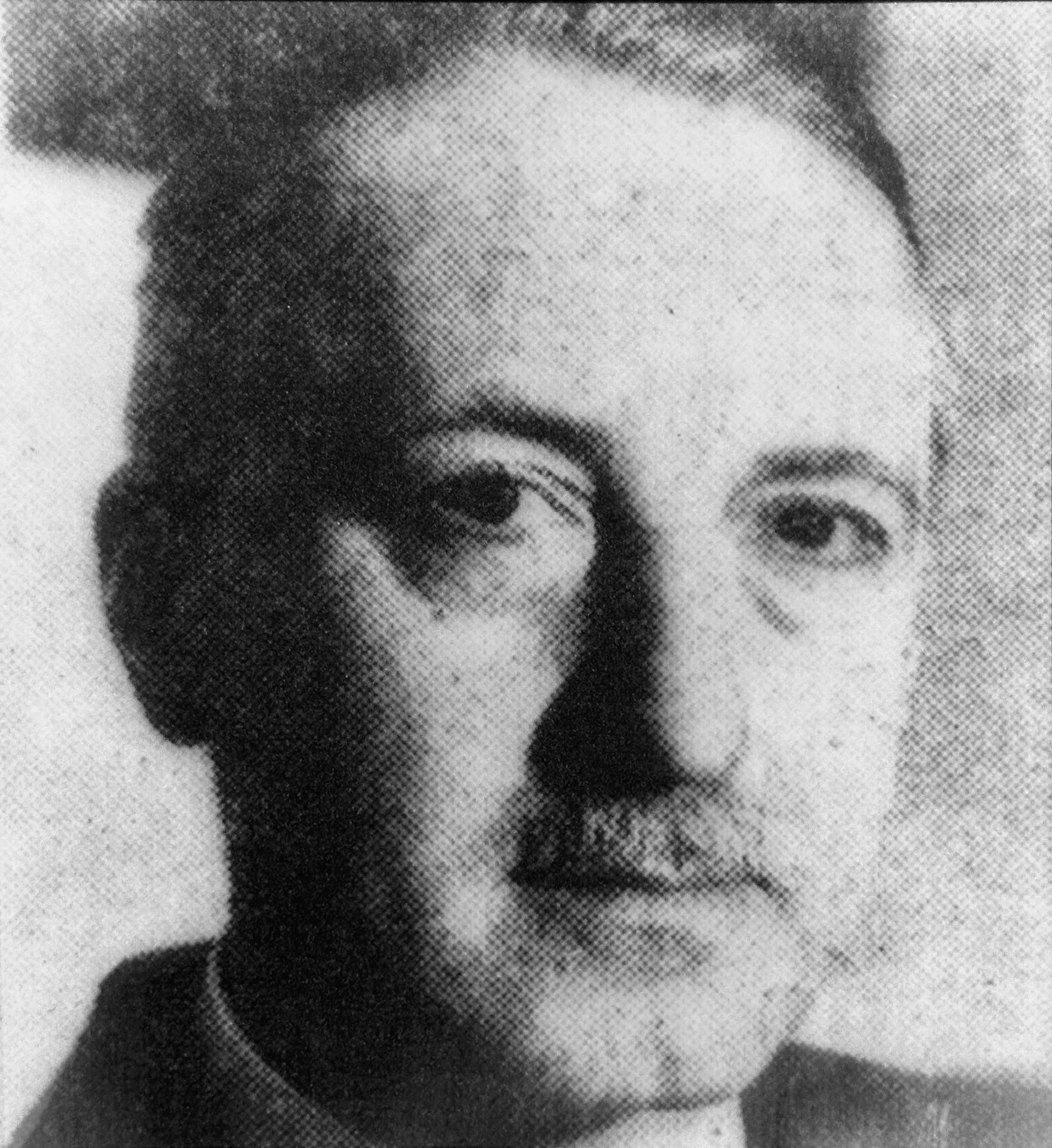
Scott during the 1959 Bruneian Constitution signing

Sir Robert Heatlie Scott, GCMG, CBE (20 September 1905 – 26 February 1982) was a British civil servant who became Permanent Secretary of the Ministry of Defence.

== Career ==
Educated at Inverness Academy, Queen's Royal College in Trinidad and New College, Oxford, Scott was called to the bar before joining the civil service in 1927. In 1941, during the Second World War, he sat on the Governor's War Council in Singapore. He was taken prisoner by the Japanese after Singapore was captured and beaten and tortured.

After the war Scott became Assistant Under-Secretary of State at the Foreign Office and then Minister at the British Embassy in Washington D. C. before returning to Singapore as Commissioner-General in 1955. He went on to be Commandant of the Imperial Defence College in 1960 and then Permanent Secretary of the Ministry of Defence in 1961.

In retirement Scott was Lord Lieutenant of Peeblesshire and then Lord Lieutenant of Tweeddale. He lived at Lyne Station House in Peeblesshire.

== Family ==
In 1933 Scott married Rosamond Aeliz Dewar-Durie; they had a son and a daughter.

Military offices
Preceded by Sir Geoffrey Bourne	Commandant of the Imperial Defence College; 1960–1961	Succeeded by Sir Hugh Constantine
Government offices
Preceded by Sir Edward Playfair	Permanent Secretary of the Ministry of Defence; 1961–1963	Succeeded by Sir Henry Hardman
