= Bill Jeffrey =

British civil servant

Sir William Alexander Jeffrey, KCB (born 28 February 1948) is a former senior British civil servant, who retired in the autumn of 2010.

Jeffrey was educated at Allan Glen's School, Glasgow, and the Glasgow University. He joined the Home Office in 1971. From 1998 until 2002 he was Political Director of the Northern Ireland Office, supporting the Prime Minister and successive Secretaries of State on the implementation of the Good Friday Agreement. He was subsequently Britain's most senior immigration official – director-general of the Immigration and Nationality Directorate – from 2002 to 2005.

In April 2005 he joined the Cabinet Office as Security and Intelligence Coordinator, where he was the Prime Minister's principal adviser on security, intelligence, and counter-terrorism strategy. In September 2005 he was announced as Permanent Secretary of the Ministry of Defence. Already a Companion of the Order of the Bath (CB), he was made Knight Commander of the Order of the Bath (KCB) in the 2007 New Year Honours List.

Bill Jeffrey is now Chair of the UK's independent policing think tank the Police Foundation.

== Criticism ==
Jeffrey has been criticised by the Public Accounts Committee chairman Edward Leigh for prioritizing the renovating of leisure facilities over the "unacceptable housing" conditions for troops and their families. The paper said 19,000 service homes were in disrepair, half of all single accommodation was "below par" and that some servicemen would have to wait 20 years for improvements. Edward Leigh said: "...you [Bill Jeffrey] have cut £13.5 million of essential work out of regional prime contracts, but you have obliged the same contractors to do £45 million on other projects, including resurfacing tennis courts and building all-weather pitches.

As director-general of the Immigration and Nationality Directorate Jeffrey formulated a concerted policy of risk-taking by immigration staff who were asked when processing non-European Union migrants applying to work, study or marry to attempt, where possible, to make positive (permissive) judgments where it was not certain that applications could be denied. He communicated this policy, applying to hundreds of thousands of cases, in a note to Beverley Hughes, minister of state for citizenship and immigration. Hughes was later forced to resign for misleading MPs about whether she had been warned of the likely threat of Romanian and Bulgarian crime gangs taking advantage of the UK opening its borders to those seeking work from eastern Europe. This Whitehall correspondence, which was illegally withheld by the Home Office for four years, reveals an official policy to grant applications rather than to refuse them, thus fast-tracking over 300,000 applications with minimal checks. According to Times reporters, a number of serious criminals were admitted, including members of the Taliban.

Government offices
Preceded by Sir David Omand	Security and Intelligence Coordinator, Cabinet Office; 2005	Succeeded by Sir Richard Mottram
Preceded by Sir Kevin Tebbit	Permanent Secretary of the Ministry of Defence; 2005–2010	Succeeded by Ursula Brennan
