= Athelstan Rendall (pilot) =

British Pilot

Athelstan Sigfrid Mellersh Rendall OBE (3 January 1914 – 18 July 2006), known to his friends as Flaps Rendall, was a British pilot.

After gaining his pilot's licence, Rendall served with Imperial Airways, the Government of colonial Nigeria, the British Overseas Airways Corporation, and British Airways, becoming commander of its Vickers VC10 fleet. For his services during the Second World War, Norway appointed him a Knight of the Order of Saint Olav. He ended his career as an advisor to Air Ceylon.

== Early life ==
Rendall was born at Chagford, Devon, on 3 January 1914. After leaving Gresham's School he attended the University of Leeds, where he graduated BSc in 1934. His first job was with the Herts and Essex Aero Club, where he stayed for two years, working as a ground engineer. While there, he gained a pilot's licence, and in 1936 successfully applied to Imperial Airways to join the company as a pilot officer.

== Career ==
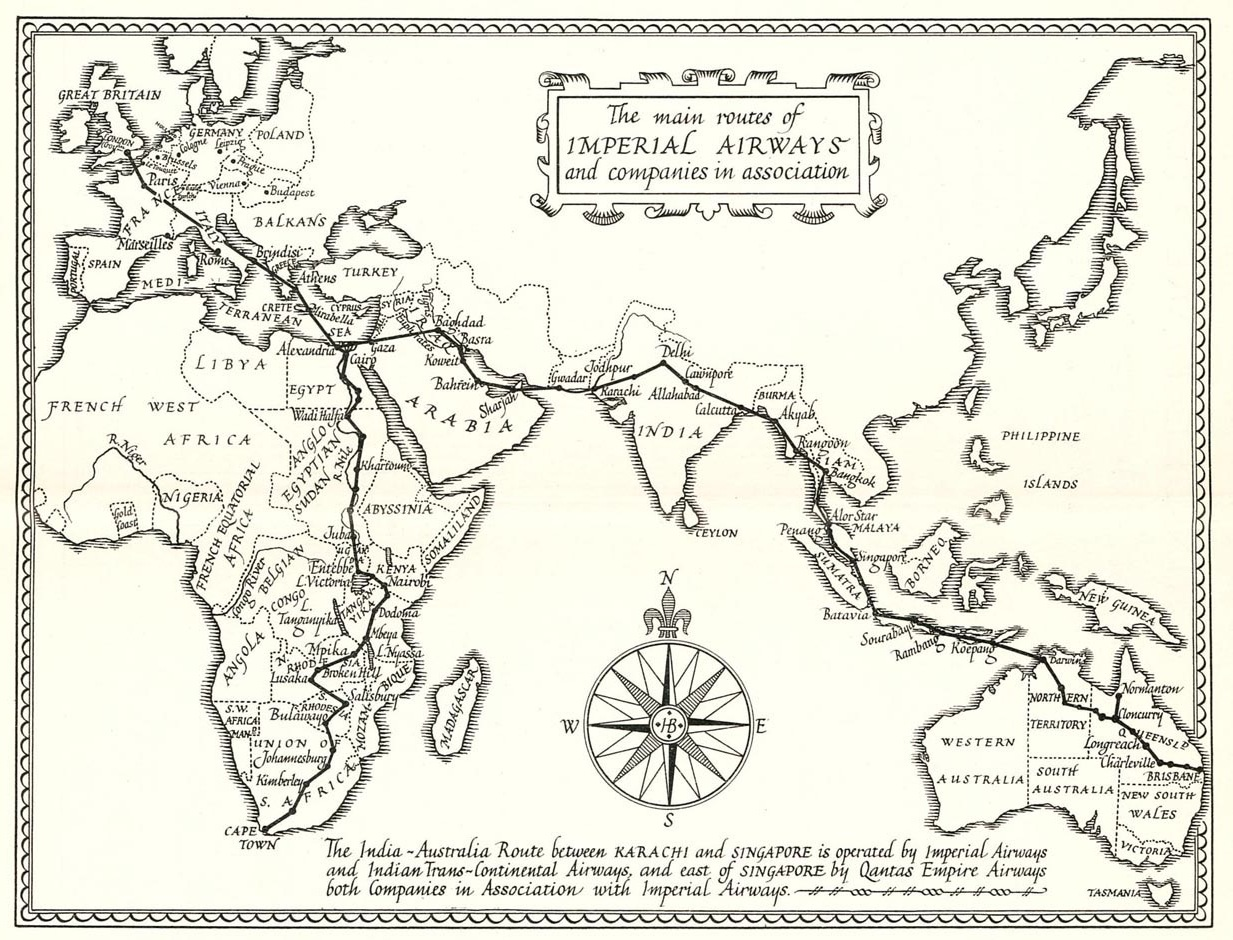
Imperial Airways routes in 1935

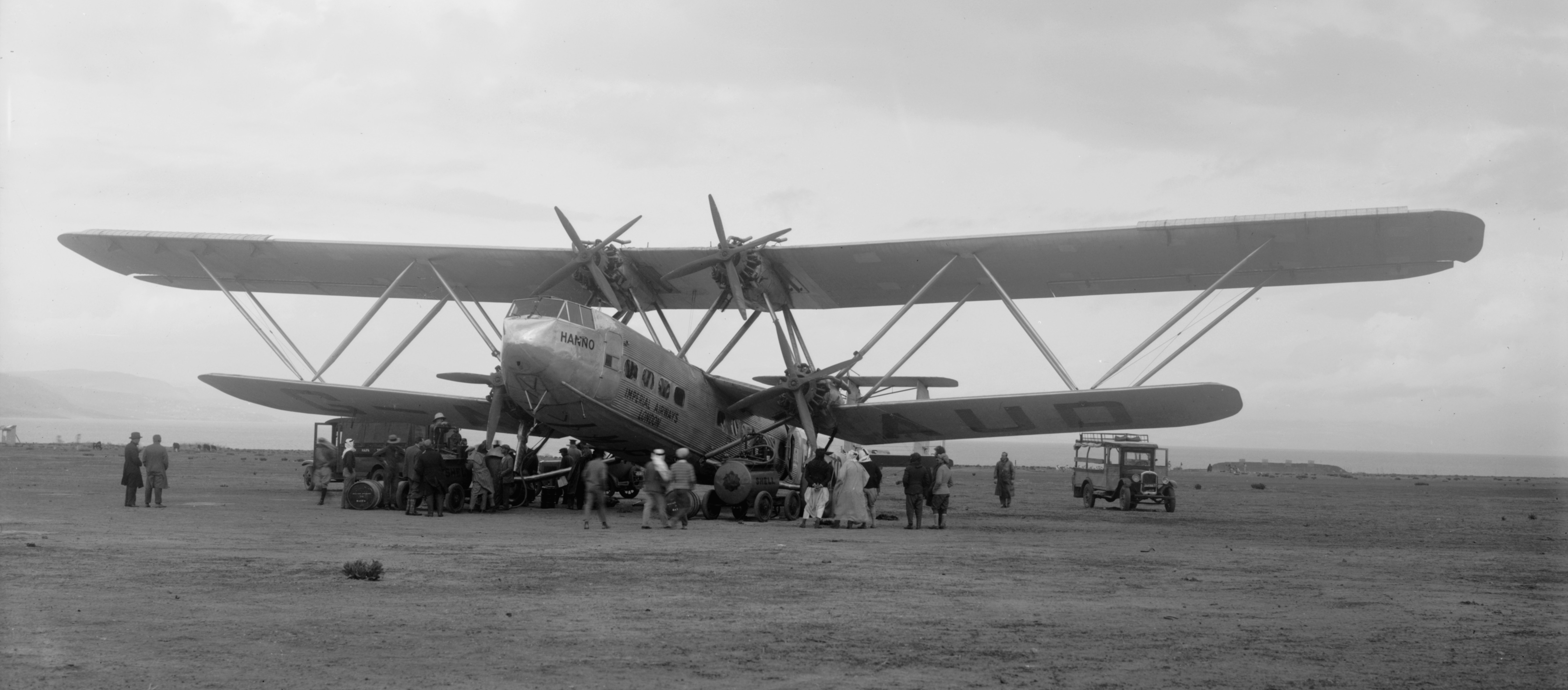
The Handley Page HP42

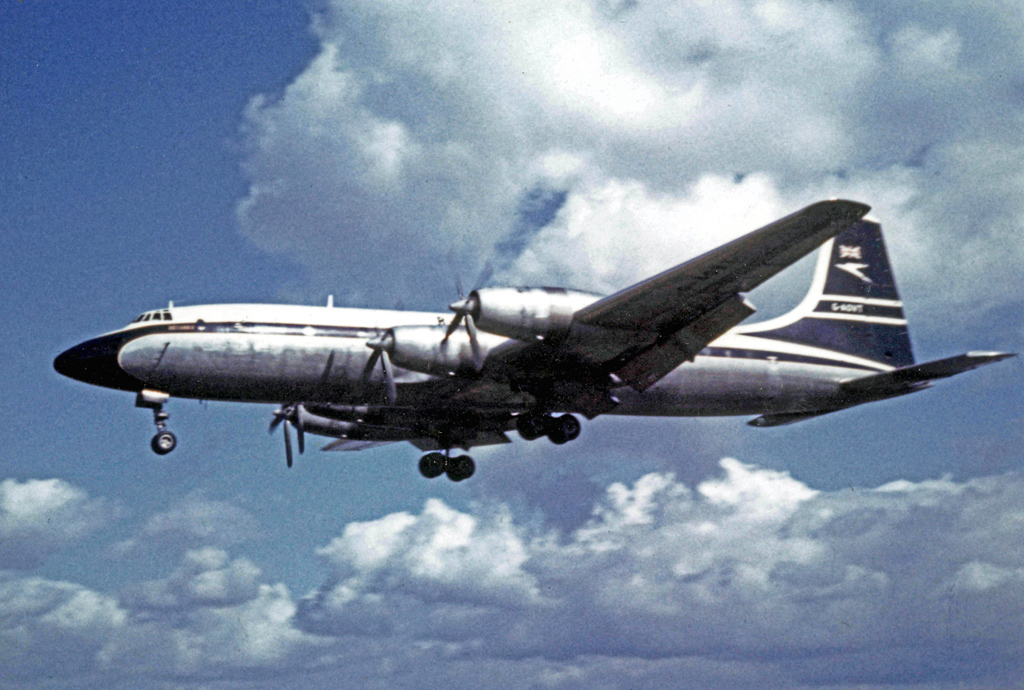
The Bristol 175 Britannia

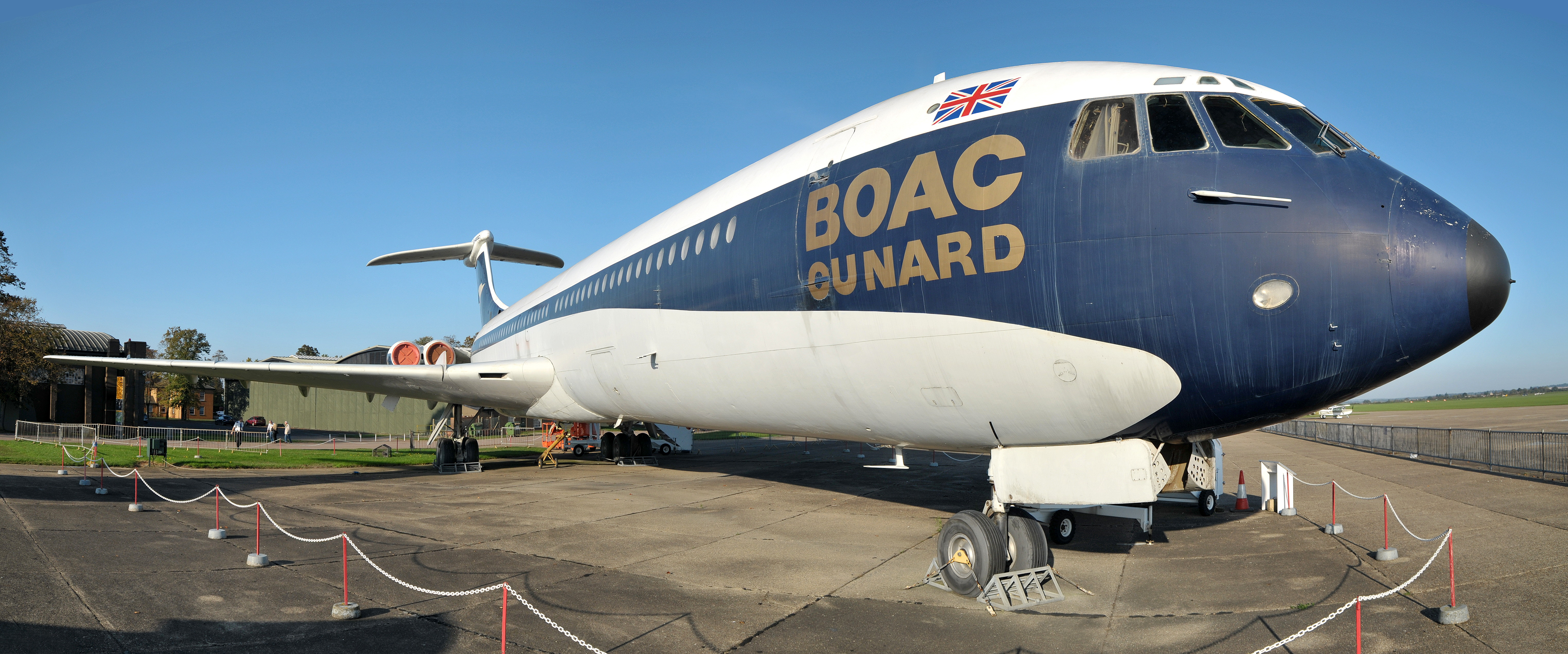
A BOAC VC10

In 1936 Rendall's flying career began as a co-pilot in a biplane, the HP 42 Hannibal, flying between Croydon Airport, London, and Paris–Le Bourget. After that, he joined the new de Havilland Express route between Khartoum in the Sudan and air fields in West Africa. He was still a junior co-pilot, also serving as radio operator, steward, and engineer, and sometimes joked that his only actual flying activity was done by working the Express's wing flaps, which was how he came to be nicknamed "Flaps". During this phase of his career he also worked as a charter pilot for the government of the Colony and Protectorate of Nigeria. On 1 April 1940, Imperial Airways was merged into a new company called the British Overseas Airways Corporation (BOAC).

In the first year of the Second World War, working out of Lagos, Nigeria, Rendall flew General Charles de Gaulle, as part of a campaign by the Allies to control the French African colonies. He was by now flying a Curtiss Commando for BOAC's worldwide service on flights to Gibraltar and Lisbon, and to the besieged Malta. The flights to Malta were at night, due to enemy action. After some eighteen months, he changed from flying the Commando to the Dakota. BOAC had stopped flying to Stockholm, due to the war, but in 1941 it re-established a service, and Rendall found himself flying Dakotas at night over Denmark to bring back vital industrial Swedish ball bearings from Stockholm to Great Britain. Denmark was occupied by German forces at the time, and the Dakotas he was flying were replaced by faster Mosquitos. In the last year of the war, Rendall transferred to fly Avro Yorks and Liberators to Cairo, and then to fly Lancasters to Australia. He also piloted Yorks on the route to Singapore and was promoted to the rank of Flight Captain.

After the war, when the Hermes airliner came into service, Rendall was made flight superintendent of the BOAC Hermes fleet. He went on to become one of the earliest pilots to fly the new Bristol Britannia airliner and was again flight superintendent. In 1957 he flew Queen Elizabeth the Queen Mother on a visit to the Central African Federation, and he also flew Harold Macmillan, then the British prime minister, on a tour of Africa. In the same year he was appointed as deputy manager of his airline's fleet of Britannias. BOAC next posted him to Sydney as flight captain of its fleet of Boeing 707s, and then in 1962 he was transferred to command the Corporation's new Vickers VC10 fleet. This was a new British airliner aiming to rival the American machines then dominating long-haul flights. Praising the VC-10 in The Economist in 1964, Rendall said "VC-10s land 20 miles per hour slower than any of the other big jets. That's good. Yet they take off the runway sooner and cruise faster". In 1965, on behalf of BOAC, Rendall accepted the Cumberbatch Trophy for air safety, presented by Prince Philip, Duke of Edinburgh, as Grand Master of the Guild of Air Pilots and Air Navigators. In 1966, he commented on some problems BOAC faced when introducing new aircraft, making the point that flight simulators were very valuable for early training, but when a new aircraft first went on sale they were rarely available.

When he retired from British Airways, as the company had become in 1974, Rendall's log book recorded 15,500 hours of flying in fourteen different aircraft types. He then worked for Air Ceylon for three years, as an advisor on its new Hawker Siddeley Trident airliners.

== Personal life ==
In 1938 Rendall married Marian Emma Morton, and they had six children, four of whom were twins. So that he could drive them all on motoring holidays, Rendall had an extra row of seats added to his car, a Lea-Francis. He was also a keen yachtsman, managing a 60-foot motor yacht for a friend who kept it in the Mediterranean, and going on to have a boat of his own built for sailing.

Rendall's eldest son also became a BOAC pilot, and one of his granddaughters joined the Royal Air Force, flying a VC10 with No. 101 Squadron RAF which had previously been flown by her father and her grandfather.

Early in 1990, the Rendalls were living at Medstead, near Alton, Hampshire. His wife died in May 1990, and Rendall lived on for a further sixteen years. He died in July 2006 at the age of 92, survived by all of his children.

== Honours ==
- 1945: Knight of the Norwegian Order of Saint Olav (First Class), for wartime services
- 1954: Queen's Commendation for Valuable Services in the Air
- 1955: Guild of Air Pilots and Navigators Master Pilot Certificate "for long service and high achievement"
- 1959: Liveryman of the Guild of Air Pilots and Navigators
- 1 January 1964 (1964 New Year Honours): Officer of the Order of the British Empire
