= Harold Parker (civil servant) =

English civil servant (1895–1980)

Sir Harold Parker, KCB, KBE, MC (1895 – 5 February 1980) was an English civil servant. He entered the civil service in 1914 but his career was interrupted by service in the First World War; he joined HM Treasury after demobilization in 1919. He was deputy secretary at the Ministry of Pensions from 1941 to 1946 and the Secretary of the Ministry from 1946 to 1948. Between 1947 and 1956, he was the Permanent Secretary of the Ministry of Defence. After leaving the service, he was chairman of the Corporation of Insurance Brokers Society of Pension Consultants until 1970, and a president of the Amateur Swimming Association in 1958.

Government offices
Preceded by Sir Henry Wilson Smith	Permanent Secretary of the Ministry of Defence; 1948–1956	Succeeded by Sir Richard Powell
