= Arthur Drew =

Sir Arthur Charles Walter Drew, KCB, JP (2 September 1912 – 15 October 1993) was an English civil servant.

He was born in Mexico, the son of Arthur Drew of Mexico City and Louise Schulte-Ummingen. He was educated at Christ's Hospital and studied at King's College, Cambridge.

Drew entered the civil service in 1936 as an official in the War Office. Rapid promotion during rearmament and the war preceded his appointment as private secretary to the secretary of state in 1945. From 1951 to 1954, he was seconded to NATO and then became director of finance at the War Office in 1955. Promoted to deputy secretary two years later, he was appointed to that grade in the Home Office in 1961. From 1963 to 1964, he was the last Permanent Secretary of the War Office. With its amalgamation into the Ministry of Defence in 1964, he was appointed the Second Permanent Secretary there, initially with responsibility for the Army and later for administration. He retired in 1972. He was chairman of the Museums and Galleries Commission from 1978 to 1984 and was also Master of the Drapers' Company and the chairman of the Ancient Monuments Board of England. His wife Rachel was the daughter of Guy William Lambert, CB, a senior official in the War Office.

Government offices
| Preceded by Sir Richard Way | Permanent Secretary of the War Office; 1963–1964 | Succeeded by position abolished Sir Henry Hardman (as Permanent Secretary, Ministry of Defence) himself (as Second Permanent Secretary, Ministry of Defence (Royal Air Force) |
| Preceded by himself (as Permanent Secretary of the War Office) | Second Permanent Secretary of the Ministry of Defence (Army); 1964–1968 | Succeeded by himself (as Second Permanent Secretary (Administration)) |
| Preceded by himself (as Second Permanent Secretary (Army)); Sir Michael Cary (as Second Permanent Secretary (Royal Navy)); Sir Martin Flett (as Second Permanent Secretary (Royal Air Force)); Sir Ronald Melville (as Second Permanent Secretary until 1966) | Second Permanent Secretary of the Ministry of Defence (Administration); 1968–1972; With: Sir Martin Flett (1968–1971) (as Second Permanent Secretary (Equipment)) | Succeeded by Sir John Wilson |
