= ECF grading system =

The ECF grading system was the rating system formerly used by the English Chess Federation. A rating produced by the system was known as an ECF grading.

The English Chess Federation did not switch to the international standard Elo rating system until 2020.

== History ==
ECF was first published in 1958, devised by Richard W. B. Clarke, father of politician Charles Clarke. Grades were updated on a six monthly cycle between 2012 and 2020, based on results towards the end of June and December; before 2012 grades were published annually. In July 2020 the English Chess Federation moved to publishing ratings monthly using a modified Elo system.

== Calculation of rating ==
Every competitive game played under the ECF system gives a "performance grade" that is "score" or "points" for each player (later used as the basis for an averaged cyclical or yearly grade, their "personal grade" they take into all matches in that cycle or year):
$$\text{Performance Grade} = \text{Opponent's grade for the cycle or year}
\begin{cases}
+50 & \text{if game won} \\
\pm0 & \text{if game drawn} \\
-50 & \text{if game lost}
\end{cases}
\qquad,\text{unless difference in grades is}
\ge40$$

Thus if Player A who is graded 160 beats Player B graded 140, then, Player A's score for noting for later annual or cyclical averaging is 190; Player B's is 110. A whole series of 30 games drawing against a player results in a swap of personal grades. ECF grades appear to be zero-sum when looking at a game in isolation; however, negative scores are deemed zero. This means a player's grade after every six months is only then calculated.

The more games played, the more the end-of-cycle re-grading is affected directly or indirectly by this tiny inflationary effect at the bottom of the league so ECF grades are nonzero-sum. Countering this, a retiring or deceased master who had not appreciably shed points loses their accumulation available, otherwise open to competitors. The Federation has to recalibrate grades based on this discrete variable, and looks at the very approximate other-systems conversion formulae in so doing.

The unless part describes a tempering of the grade for future totting up as to disparate matches: players of grades facing each other of more than 40 points apart are deemed be exactly 40 points different. Had Player B's grade been 100, Player A would have scored: 170, and Player B: 90. This prevents players increasing their grade by losing to much higher-graded players and also means that the stronger player notes 10 points higher for their annual points tally (grade) when winning.

At the end of a cycle, each player's performance grades for that cycle are averaged to give the personal grade used for the following period. If fewer than 30 games have been played, games from last cycle(s) are usually included in the average to make the number up to 30.

A weakness of many other systems is treatment of juniors. Juniors tend to improve and therefore their rating/grading lags their current strength. The ECF grading system addresses this by changing the mathematical frame of reference for those aged under 18. The system above uses each player's grade from the previous cycle to calculate the personal grade. For juniors this uses year instead of cycle (including the recalculation of grades of junior opponents). It is this recalculation that becomes the performance grade for the final calculation for all players.

In theory a non-chess player would have a personal grade of 0; in practice negative grades exist but are set to 0 on the grading list. The weakest adult club players come in at about 40. A three-figure grade is a source of prestige among casual players, while those who seriously study the game may try to achieve a personal grade of 150. A player graded over 200 is usually well-known to rival circuits and might consider aiming for a master title. Grades far above 200 lose much of their significance as very strong players tend to play mostly in internationally rated tournaments.

The 150 Attack, a no-nonsense response to the Pirc Defence popularised by British players, derives from this system. Per Sam Collins in Understanding the Chess Openings this is because "even a 150-rated player could handle the White side".

Due to the inherent simplicity, a benefits it has over the Elo rating system used by FIDE, is scores are simple after each result without coded software or a calculator, and retention of personal grades over a cycle of typically at least 30 games.

Before 2005 all personal grades were confirmed by the former British Chess Federation: BCF grades.

== Conversion to and from Elo ratings ==
Although the ECF grading system is mechanically very different from the Elo rating system, the ECF publishes formulae that can be used to estimate the equivalent ECF grade of a FIDE Elo rating, and vice versa:

$$E = \frac{F - 700}{7.5}$$

$$F = 7.5E + 700$$

In the formula above E is the ECF rating (not Elo) and F is the FIDE rating. According to this formula, therefore, an ECF rating of 150 would equate to an estimated FIDE rating of 1825.

The ECF grading system was recalibrated in 2009. Various other conversion formulae have been used but usually relate to the forerunner.

This grades some games outside Federation matches where opponents lack an ECF grade. It is designed to give a best estimate conversion. It is often used by organisers of English congresses to determine qualification for grade-restricted events when a player has an Elo rating only.

== See also ==
- Chess rating systems

== Notes ==
- https://www.ecfrating.org.uk/v2/new/list_players.php
