= Christopher France (civil servant) =

English civil servant

Sir Christopher Walter France, GCB (2 April 1934 – 21 October 2014) was an English civil servant.

Educated at East Ham Grammar School and New College, Oxford, he completed his National Service in the Royal Marines.

After a short spell teaching, he entered HM Treasury in 1959. He was the principal private secretary to the Chancellor of the Exchequer from 1973 to 1976. After a year's secondment at the Electricity Council, he moved to the Ministry of Defence in 1981 as a deputy secretary and then the Department of Health and Social Security in 1984; he was the DHSS's Second Permanent Secretary from 1986 to 1987 and then Permanent Secretary from 1987 to 1988, when the department was split and France became Permanent Secretary of the new Department of Health, serving until 1992 and overseeing major NHS reforms, the government response to the HIV/AIDS crisis and the Salmonella crisis of 1988. He was then Permanent Secretary of the Ministry of Defence from 1992 to 1995, which coincided with the restructuring of the British military following the collapse of the Soviet Union. In retirement, he was chairman of Queen Mary College from 1995 to 2003. He was an inaugural Fellow of the Academy of Medical Sciences.

His wife Valerie Edith Larman was head of the City of London School for Girls from 1986 to 1995.

Government offices
Preceded by Sir Michael Quinlan	Permanent Secretary of the Ministry of Defence; 1992–1995	Succeeded by Sir Richard Mottram
