= Henry Wilson Smith =

British civil servant (1904–78)

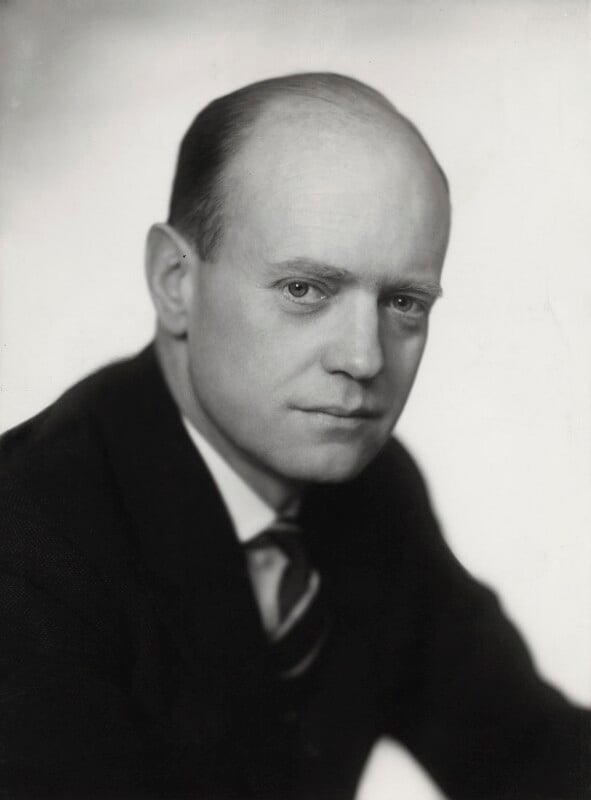
Smith in the 1940s

Sir Henry Wilson Smith, KCB, KBE (30 December 1904 – 28 March 1978) was a British civil servant.

Educated at Royal Grammar School, Newcastle and Peterhouse, Cambridge, he began his career in the General Post Office in 1927 before moving to HM Treasury in 1930. He was Assistant Private Secretary to the Chancellor of the Exchequer from 1932 and Principal Private Secretary in 1940. He was Under-Secretary to the Treasury 1942–1946, Permanent Secretary at the Ministry of Defence 1947-1948 and additional Second Secretary to the Treasury 1948 to 1951. He was made KBE in 1945 and KCB in 1949.

In retirement he held several directorships including of the Bank of England.

Government offices
Preceded by none (ministry established)	Permanent Secretary of the Ministry of Defence; 1947–1948	Succeeded by Sir Harold Parker
