= James Macdonald Dunnett =

British civil servant (1877–1953)

Sir James Macdonald Dunnett KCIE
- Portrait by Walter Stoneman, 1934

Reforms Commissioner of the Government of India
- In office 1930–1936

Personal details
- Born: 1877 Kilmarnock, Scotland
- Died: 1953 (aged 75–76)
- Education: University of Edinburgh; Christ Church, Oxford
- Occupation: Civil servant

Sir James Macdonald Dunnett KCIE (1877–1953) was a civil servant in the Indian Civil Service.

== Early life ==
Dunnett was born in 1877 in Kilmarnock, to William Dunnett, a minister. He attended Kilmarnock Academy, and then University of Edinburgh from which he graduated with an MA with honours in mathematics, before studying at Christ Church, Oxford.

== Career ==
After passing the entrance exam in 1900, he entered the Indian Civil Service where. In 1901 he became the assistant commissioner for the Punjab, and from 1930 to 1936 the Reforms Commissioner of the Government of India. In 1922 he was made a Companion of the Indian Empire. He was made a knight bachelor in 1932 and a Knight Commander of the Order of the Indian Empire in 1934. His final civil service appointment was in Britain as 1940 as Assistant Secretary in the Scottish Department of Health.

He married Annie Sangster, with whom he had four children, their second son being Sir James Dunnett, a notable UK civil servant.
