= Richard Powell (civil servant) =

English civil servant

Sir Richard Royle Powell, GCB, KBE, CMG (30 July 1909 – 30 March 2006) was an English civil servant. Educated at Sidney Sussex College, Cambridge, he spent a year as a research fellow at his college before entering the civil service in 1931 as an official in the Admiralty. During the Second World War, he spelt periods in Canada, the United States and Australia. In 1946, he was moved to the Ministry of Defence; with the exception of a period as deputy secretary at the Admiralty from 1948 to 1950, he remained there until 1959; from 1956 to 1959 he was Permanent Secretary and closely involved in the Suez Crisis. From 1960 to 1968, he was Permanent Secretary to the Board of Trade. He subsequently held a number of directorships in the City of London, including the chairmanships of Albright and Wilson, the Sandoz Group, Wilkinson Match and Alusuisse Ltd; he was president of the Institute for Fiscal Studies from 1970 to 1978.

Government offices
Preceded by Sir Harold Parker	Permanent Secretary of the Ministry of Defence; 1956–1959	Succeeded by Sir Edward Playfair
