= Ministry of Aviation =

Defunct department of the United Kingdom government

The Ministry of Aviation was a department of the United Kingdom government established in 1959. Its responsibilities included the regulation of civil aviation and the supply of military aircraft, which it took on from the Ministry of Supply.

In 1967, the Ministry of Aviation merged into the Ministry of Technology which took on the supply of military aircraft, while regulatory responsibilities were switched to the Board of Trade.

== Ministers of Aviation ==
- 14 October 1959: Duncan Sandys
- 27 July 1960: Peter Thorneycroft
- 16 July 1962: Julian Amery
- 18 October 1964: Roy Jenkins
- 23 December 1965: Frederick Mulley
- 7 January 1967 – 15 February 1967: John Stonehouse

== Parliamentary Secretaries ==
- 22 October 1959: Geoffrey Rippon
- 9 October 1961: Montague Woodhouse
- 16 July 1962: Basil de Ferranti
- 3 December 1962: Neil Marten
- 20 October 1964: John Stonehouse
- 6 April 1966 – 7 January 1967: Julian Snow

== Permanent Secretaries ==
- 1959: Sir William Strath
- 1960: Henry Hardman (knighted in 1962)
- 1963: Sir Richard Way
- 1966: Sir Richard Clarke
- 1966–7: Sir Ronald Melville

== See also ==
- Aviation in the United Kingdom
