= Michael Cary =

British civil servant (1917–1976)

Cary in 1965.

Sir Arthur Lucius Michael Cary GCB (3 April 1917 – 6 March 1976) was a British civil servant who served as Permanent Under-Secretary of State for Defence.

== Early life and education ==
Cary was born to Joyce Cary and Gertrude Margaret Ogilvie at Harrow, Middlesex.

Cary was educated at Eton and Trinity College, Oxford.

== Career ==
Cary joined HM Diplomatic Service in 1939. He served as Deputy Secretary of the Cabinet from 1961 to 1964, Secretary of the Admiralty in 1964, and Deputy Secretary at the Ministry of Defence from 1964 to 1968. Cary was Permanent Under-Secretary of State at the Ministry of Defence from 1974 to 1976.

== Honours ==
Cary was appointed a Companion of the Order of the Bath (CB) in the 1964 New Year Honours, advanced to Knight Commander of the Order of the Bath (KCB) in the 1965 Birthday Honours, and further advanced to Knight Grand Cross of the Order of the Bath (GCB) in the 1976 New Year Honours.

Government offices
Preceded by none Sir Clifford Jarrett (as Permanent Secretary of the Admiralty)	Second Permanent Secretary of the Ministry of Defence (Royal Navy); 1964–1968	Succeeded by position abolished Sir Arthur Drew (as Second Permanent Secretary (Administration)); Sir Martin Flett (as Second Permanent Secretary (Equipment))
Preceded by Sir Antony Part	Permanent Secretary of the Ministry of Public Building and Works (Royal Navy); 1968–1970	Succeeded by none ministry replaced by the Department of the Environment
Preceded by Lord Rayner	Chief Executive and Permanent Secretary of the Procurement Executive (Royal Navy); 1972–1974	Succeeded by Sir George Leitch
Preceded by Sir James Dunnett	Permanent Secretary of the Ministry of Defence; 1974–1976	Succeeded by Sir Frank Cooper
