= Rachel Lomax =

British civil servant

Janis Rachel Lomax (born 15 July 1945) is a British economist, banker, and former government official who served as Deputy Governor of the Bank of England, sitting on the Monetary Policy Committee from 1 July 2003 to 30 June 2008.

== Early life ==
Lomax was born in Swansea, Wales. She was educated at the independent Rossall Preparatory School and Cheltenham Ladies' College, and graduated from Girton College, Cambridge with an MA in 1966, before obtaining an MSc in economics from the London School of Economics in 1968.

== Career ==
After graduating from LSE in 1968, she joined HM Treasury, where she worked on a range of macroeconomic, monetary, and financial issues. She was in succession Principal Private Secretary to the Chancellor of the Exchequer Nigel Lawson in 1985–86, then a deputy secretary at the Treasury, and then Deputy Chief Economic Adviser in 1990–94. In 1994–95, she was head of the Economic and Domestic Secretariat at the Cabinet Office.

From 1995 to 1996, she was a vice-president of the World Bank and chief of staff to the President of the World Bank. From 1996 to 2003 she was in turns permanent secretary at four government departments. She was permanent secretary at the Welsh Office from 1996 to 1999, where she oversaw the setting up of the National Assembly for Wales. Afterwards, from 1999 to 2002, Lomax was permanent secretary of the Department of Social Security and then from 2001 its successor, the Department for Work and Pensions. Then in 2002–2003 Lomax served as Permanent Secretary at the Department for Transport, having moved there with her Secretary of State Alistair Darling when prime minister Tony Blair reshuffled his cabinet following the resignation—in highly charged and controversial circumstances—of the Secretary of State for Transport Stephen Byers.

From 2003 to 2008 she was a deputy governor at the Bank of England, serving on its Monetary Policy Committee, where she was "one of the more moderate, centrist figures". She left "just before the collapse of Lehman Brothers in 2008" reportedly to "pursue other interests".

In December 2008, she became an independent non-executive director of HSBC Holdings, where she is also a member of the audit and risk committees. In December 2010 she joined BAA (now Heathrow Airport Holdings) as a non-executive director, and she is also a non-executive director of Serco, and a trustee of Imperial College London, and has served as President of the Institute of Fiscal Studies.

== Personal life ==
Lomax is on the Board of the Royal National Theatre and of De Montfort University in Leicester. In June 2007 she received an honorary degree from the University of Glasgow.

She married Michael Acworth Lomax in 1967; they divorced in 1990. The couple has two sons and now have 4 granddaughters.

== Offices held ==
Government offices
Preceded by	Permanent Secretary of the Welsh Office; 1996–1999	Succeeded by
Preceded by Ann Bowtell	Permanent Secretary of the Department of Social Security; 1999–2001	Succeeded by Department replaced by Department for Work and Pensions
Preceded by none	Permanent Secretary of the Department for Work and Pensions; 2001–2002	Succeeded by Sir Richard Mottram
Preceded by Sir Richard Mottram	Permanent Secretary of the Department for Transport; 2002–2003	Succeeded by Sir David Rowlands
