= Richard Way =

British civil servant

Sir Richard Way

Sir Richard George Kitchener Way KCB CBE (15 September 1914 – 2 October 1998), commonly known as Sam Way, was a British civil servant, Chairman of London Transport and Principal of King's College London.

Way left school at 18 and joined the War Office as an executive officer working in the finance department of the ministry in London and Hong Kong. From 1949 to 1952 he worked with the British Army of the Rhine organising the army's civilian workforce. In 1955, Way was promoted to Deputy Secretary, and, in 1956, was recommended for the post of Permanent Under-Secretary. The Prime Minister Anthony Eden considered him to be too young for this level of seniority, and he was moved to the Ministry of Defence and the Ministry of Supply. In 1960, he returned to the War Office as Permanent Under-Secretary, and, when the War Office was merged with the Ministry of Defence, he became Permanent Secretary of the Ministry of Aviation in 1963, where he remained until 1966 when he left the civil service for a career in business.

He served as chairman of the Greater London Council's London Transport Executive from 1970 to 1974. In 1975 he succeeded his former colleague from the British Army of the Rhine, General Sir John Hackett as Principal of King's College London, where he remained until his retirement in 1980. Way served as Chairman of the Royal Commission for the Exhibition of 1851 from 1978 to 1987.

Way was made Commander of the Order of the British Empire (CBE) in 1952, Companion of the Order of the Bath (CB) in 1957, and Knight Commander of the Order of the Bath (KCB) in 1961. He received an honorary doctorate in science (Hon DSc) from Loughborough University in 1986.

His grave is in the churchyard of Saint Peter & Saint Paul Church, Shalden.

Government offices
Preceded by Sir Henry Hardman	Permanent Secretary of the Ministry of Aviation; 1963–1966	Succeeded by Sir Richard Clarke
Academic offices
Preceded by Sir John Hackett	Principal of King's College London; 1975–1980	Succeeded by Lord Cameron of Balhousie
Business positions
Preceded by Sir Maurice Holmes; Chairman; London Transport Board	Chairman, London Transport Executive; 1970–1974	Succeeded by Kenneth Robinson
