= Frank Cooper (civil servant) =

British civil servant

Sir Frank Cooper, GCB, CMG, PC (2 December 1922 – 26 January 2002) was a British civil servant. He was the permanent under-secretary of state for the Northern Ireland Office and Permanent Secretary of the Ministry of Defence.

== Biography ==
Cooper was born in Droylsden, Manchester, the younger child of Valentine Holland Cooper, a commercial traveller, and later a manager for a chocolate making firm, and Wynnefred Louisa, née Gardner, a teacher. His sister was the social worker Joan Davies Cooper.

He was educated at Manchester Grammar School, before beginning training as an accountant in 1939. He enlisted in the Royal Air Force in 1941 and was commissioned in 1942. After pilot training in the United States, he flew Spitfires in the Italian campaign. In 1944, he was shot down and was posted missing. Captured by German troops, he managed to escape and rejoined his unit with the help of Italian partisans. He became a flight commander in the No. 111 Squadron, and ended the war in the Far East. He declined the offer of an extended commission and was demobilized in 1946.

Cooper then went to Pembroke College, Oxford, taking third-class honours in Modern History in 1948. He then joined the Home Civil Service, becoming an Assistant Principal at the Air Ministry in 1948 and a Principal in 1951. He was Private Secretary to the Parliamentary Under-Secretary of State for Air, Aidan Crawley, from 1950 to 1951, to the Permanent Under-Secretary of State for Air, Sir James Barnes, from 1951 to 1953, and to the Chief of the Air Staff, Sir William Dickson, from 1953 to 1955.

In 1955, he was promoted to Assistant Secretary as one of the joint heads of the Air Staff Secretariat. In this capacity, he was involved in the run-up to the Suez Crisis. In 1959, he was transferred to a unit which dealt with Cyprus, where he negotiated with Archbishop Makarios over the establishment of the Sovereign Base Areas of Akrotiri and Dhekelia. The same year, he was appointed Director of Accounts at the Air Ministry. In 1962, he was promoted Assistant Under-Secretary of State (Finance), and then as Assistant Under-Secretary of State (Air Staff).

In 1964, the Air Ministry was merged into the newly created Ministry of Defence. Cooper was transferred to the new department, where he was appointed Assistant Under-Secretary of State (Policy) in 1966, and Deputy Under-Secretary of State (Policy and Programmes) in 1968. In 1970, Cooper became Deputy Secretary of the Civil Service Department.

Cooper was appointed Permanent Under-Secretary of State at the Northern Ireland Office in 1973, and Permanent Secretary of the Ministry of Defence in 1976. He was considered for, but not selected as Head of the Home Civil Service in 1977, and retired in 1982.

== Honours ==
For his work on Cyprus, Cooper was appointed a CMG in 1961. He was subsequently appointed CB in 1970, promoted to KCB in 1974, and GCB in 1979. He was sworn of the Privy Council in 1983, for his role in the Falklands War.

Government offices
Preceded by Sir Michael Cary	Permanent Secretary of the Ministry of Defence; 1976–1982	Succeeded by Sir Clive Whitmore
