= Ronald Melville (civil servant) =

English civil servant

Sir Ronald Henry Melville, KCB (9 March 1912 – 4 June 2001) was an English civil servant. Educated at Charterhouse and Magdalene College, Cambridge, he entered the civil service in 1934 as an official in the Air Ministry. For much of the Second World War, he was private secretary to the Secretary of State for Air. In 1960, he moved to the War Office, and in 1964 he was appointed Second Permanent Secretary of the Ministry of Defence. He then served as a Permanent Secretary of the Ministry of Aviation from 1966 to 1967, when it was merged into the Ministry of Technology; Melville was then secretary with responsibility for aviation matters. In 1970, he was appointed Permanent Secretary of the Ministry of Aviation Supply, serving until it was abolished in 1971.

An excellent shot, he represented Scotland in the Elcho Shield match for nearly 50 years, making his first appearance at the age of 22. He captained the Great Britain Rifle Team to Canada and the USA in 1976. From 1972 to 1984, he was chairman of the National Rifle Association; at the same time, he was a council member of the Army Cadet Force Association.

His translation of Lucretius's De Rerum Natura was published in 1997.

Government offices
Preceded by None	Second Permanent Secretary of the Ministry of Defence; 1963–1966	Succeeded by Sir Arthur Drew (from 1968)
Preceded by Sir Richard Clarke	Permanent Secretary of the Ministry of Aviation; 1966–1967	Succeeded by position abolished
Preceded by position established	Permanent Secretary of the Ministry of Aviation Supply; 1970–1971	Succeeded by position abolished
