= Anatoly Zotov =

Soviet spy

- Born: Anatoliy Pavlovich Zotov
- Occupation: Former diplomat
- Espionage activity
- Country: Soviet Union
- Allegiance: Soviet Union
- Service branch: GRU (G.U.)
- Rank: Captain

Captain Anatoliy Pavlovich Zotov was a naval attaché to the Soviet Embassy in London who was expelled in December 1982 for conduct unbecoming a diplomat. At the time, it was the highest-ranking and most significant expulsion of Soviet Union officials from the UK since 1971 when 100 general Soviet personnel were expelled upon charges of spying. Zotov was expelled after being accused of attempting to set up a network of agents to gather information about weapons systems and electronic hardware used by the Royal Navy during the Falklands War.

== The plot ==
Zotov and the Soviet air attaché Serge Smirnov, followed by Special Branch and MI5, went on a holiday visit to Portsmouth. Dressed in casual clothes and carrying cameras, the two took a pleasure boat which took trippers around the Devonport dockyard to look at warships at anchor. Later, at the Plymouth public library, Zotov requested books on submarines and photocopied an article from the magazine National Review. He told the librarian that he was the Soviet naval attache, and later when he talked to two drinkers at a pub he identified himself in the same way. The two drinkers were later questioned by Special Branch about the conversation, and revealed that Zotov had offered them the opportunity to become Soviet agents.

== The response ==
After the UK accused Zotov of conduct unbecoming of a diplomat, code for espionage, he was expelled from the country. Once expelled, Zotov would go on to vehemently denounce the charges of espionage, while the Soviet Union suggested the incident overblown and a ploy to divert attention from recent intelligence failures in the UK. After Zotov's expulsion, the Soviet Union would go onto expel the British Ambassador Ian Sutherland.

One confounding aspect of the Zotov expulsion is that Soviets were the ones to leak the story to Britain's domestic news agency, the Press Association, the night before the UK would officially confirm it.

== See also ==
- Geoffrey Prime: Former British spy, convicted of Soviet espionage around the same time. Zotov was charged with being associated with him. At the time, the Daily Mail speculated that Geoffrey Prime was the actual source exposing Zotov.
- Hugh Hambleton: Canadian-British economist, spy, and double-agent, working in service of the Soviet Union in the same period.
