= Ministry of Defence (1947–1964) =

United Kingdom post-war government ministry

- Coat of Arms of the United Kingdom (HM Government)

Agency overview
- Formed: 1947
- Dissolved: 1964
- Superseding agency: Ministry of Defence (from 1964)
- Jurisdiction: Government of the United Kingdom
- Headquarters: Ministry of Defence building Whitehall; London
- Parent agency: HM Government

The Ministry of Defence was a department of the British Government responsible for defence and the British Armed Forces.

== History ==
Prior to the Second World War defence policy was co-ordinated by the Committee of Imperial Defence (CID). In 1936, the post of Minister for Co-ordination of Defence was established, though he did not have a department and the political heads of the three services—the First Lord of the Admiralty for the Royal Navy, the Secretary of State for War for the Army and the Secretary of State for Air for the Royal Air Force—continued to attend Cabinet.

On the outbreak of war in 1939, the CID was suspended and on, 3 April 1940, the office of Minister for Co-ordination of Defence was abolished. When Winston Churchill became Prime Minister in May 1940, he personally assumed responsibility for inter-service co-ordination, with the title of Minister of Defence, and the heads of the three services were not included in the War Cabinet. The Minister had few departments, the most famous of which was MD1 which allowed unusual ideas for weapons to be developed under the patronage of Churchill with less interference from the services and got the nickname "Churchill's Toyshop".

After the end of the war in Europe in May 1945, the First Lord and the Secretaries for War and Air rejoined the Cabinet, though the Prime Minister remained Minister of Defence.

The suspension of the CID was made permanent by a White Paper (Cmd. 6923) in 1946, and, from 4 October that year, the service chiefs were no longer in the Cabinet. The former First Lord of the Admiralty A.V. Alexander was appointed Minister of Defence on 20 December 1946 and the Ministry of Defence was formally established on 1 January 1947 by the Ministry of Defence Act 1946. The Ministry was responsible for liaising between the individual service ministries and co-ordinating defence policy.

Under the Defence (Transfer of Functions) Act 1964, the Ministry of Defence was merged with the Admiralty, the War Office and the Air Ministry to form the current Ministry of Defence on 1 April 1964; the Minister of Defence became Secretary of State for Defence.

== Parliamentary secretaries to the Ministry of Defence, 1952–1964 ==
- 28 February 1952: Nigel Birch
- 18 October 1954: The Lord Carrington
- 26 May 1956: The Earl of Gosford
- 18 January 1957: The Lord Mancroft
- 11 June 1957: office vacant.

== See also ==
- Secretary of State for Defence
- Ministry of Defence (United Kingdom)

== Sources ==
- David Butler and Gareth Butler, Twentieth Century British Political Facts 1900–2000, eighth edition, Macmillan, 2000
