= Robert Armstrong, Baron Armstrong of Ilminster =

British civil servant and peer (1927–2020)

The Right Honourable The Lord Armstrong of Ilminster GCB CVO
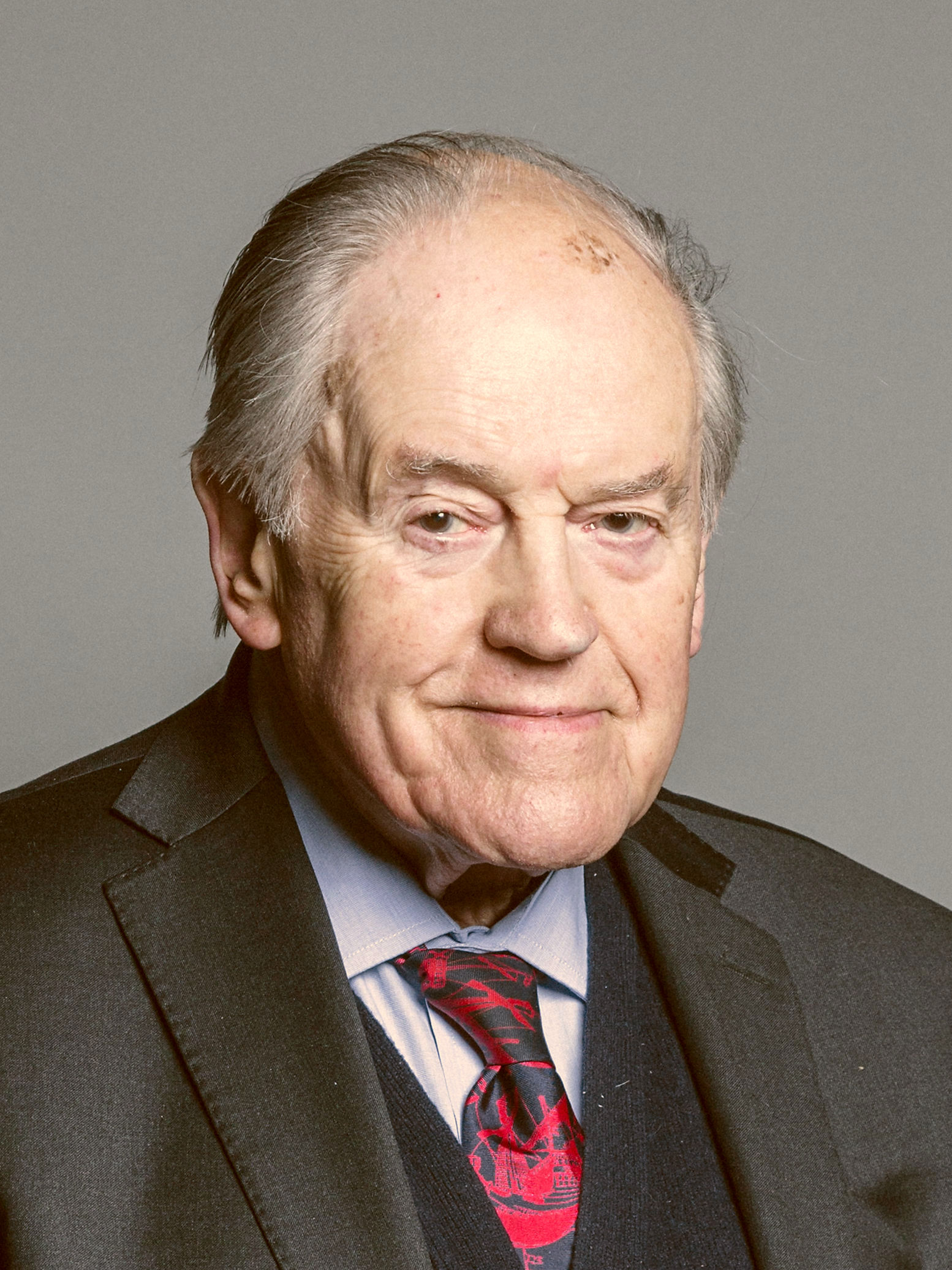
- Official portrait, 2018

Member of the House of Lords
- Lord Temporal
- Life peerage 26 February 1988 – 3 April 2020

Principal Private Secretary to the Prime Minister
- In office 1970–1975
- Prime Minister: Edward Heath; Harold Wilson
- Preceded by: Alexander Isserlis
- Succeeded by: Kenneth Stowe

Permanent Under-Secretary of State at the Home Office
- In office 1977–1979
- Prime Minister: James Callaghan
- Preceded by: Sir Arthur Peterson
- Succeeded by: Brian Cubbon

Cabinet Secretary
- In office 1979–1987
- Prime Minister: Margaret Thatcher
- Preceded by: Sir John Hunt
- Succeeded by: Sir Robin Butler

Head of the Home Civil Service
- In office 1981–1987
- Prime Minister: Margaret Thatcher
- Preceded by: Sir Douglas Allen
- Succeeded by: Sir Robin Butler

Chancellor of the University of Hull
- In office 1994 – 12 April 2006
- Preceded by: Richard Wilberforce
- Succeeded by: Virginia Bottomley

Personal details
- Born: Robert Temple Armstrong; 30 March 1927 Headington, Oxford, England
- Died: 3 April 2020 (aged 93) Ashill, Somerset, England
- Party: None (crossbencher)
- Spouses: Serena Mary Benedicta (m. 1953, divorced); Mary Patricia Carlow (m. 1985)
- Relations: Sir Thomas H. W. Armstrong (father)
- Children: 2
- Education: Dragon School; Eton College
- Alma mater: Christ Church, Oxford
- Occupation: Civil servant

Robert Temple Armstrong, Baron Armstrong of Ilminster, GCB, CVO (30 March 1927 – 3 April 2020) was a British civil servant and life peer.

== Early life and education ==
Armstrong was born on 30 March 1927, the only son of the musician Sir Thomas H. W. Armstrong and his wife (married in 1926) Hester Muriel, daughter of Rev. W. H. Draper, at one time vicar of Adel, Leeds. He had one sister.

Armstrong was educated at the Dragon School and then at Eton College, where he was a King's Scholar, following which he went up to Christ Church, Oxford, where he read Greats.

== Career ==
In a long civil service career, Armstrong worked in several departments, including HM Treasury and the Home Office. From 1970 to 1975 he served as the Principal Private Secretary to Prime Ministers Edward Heath and Harold Wilson. He was knighted in 1978. From 1979 to 1987, he served as Cabinet Secretary under Margaret Thatcher.

Armstrong was appointed a Companion of the Order of the Bath (CB) in 1974, a Commander of the Royal Victorian Order (CVO) in the 1975 Birthday Honours. In the 1978 Birthday Honours he was promoted to Knight Commander of the Order of the Bath (KCB) and to Knight Grand Cross (GCB) in the 1983 New Year Honours.

== Spycatcher trial ==
In 1986, Armstrong was the key witness for the British Government as it sought to suppress the publication of Spycatcher, in which it alleged its author, Peter Wright, had attempted to disclose confidential information. At the time Wright was a retired high-ranking member of MI5 and was about to publish his book in Australia. The evidence given by Armstrong was widely ridiculed by the British press for its absurd ambiguity and seemingly deceptive nature. Wright's lawyer, Malcolm Turnbull, who later became the Prime Minister of Australia, was ultimately successful in lifting the publication ban. Turnbull described Armstrong as being like "Sir Humphrey Appleby" from Yes Minister and said "If he is an honest man, then he appears rather like a well-educated mushroom".

He is credited with bringing the phrase "economical with the truth" into popular usage, after he used it during the Spycatcher trial in 1986; his use of the phrase was subsequently included in the Oxford Dictionary of Quotations.

== Later life ==
He was created a life peer as Baron Armstrong of Ilminster, of Ashill in the County of Somerset, on 26 February 1988, and sat as a crossbencher.

From 1994 to 2006, Lord Armstrong was Chancellor of the University of Hull. He was chairman of the Sir Edward Heath Charitable Foundation until 2013.

== Allegations of child abuse 'coverup' ==
Armstrong was aware of Sir Peter Hayman's paedophilia, and after leaving office, commented "Clearly, I was aware of it at the time but I was not concerned with the personal aspect of it."

Armstrong gave Margaret Thatcher what he called a "veiled" warning not to sanction Jimmy Savile's knighthood for charitable work, due to allegations around his "misbehaviour with women (though not allegations of child abuse)".

== In popular culture ==
Armstrong has been portrayed by the following actors in film and television productions:

- Rupert Vansittart in the 2002 BBC production of Ian Curteis's controversial The Falklands Play.
- Timothy West in the 2004 BBC production of The Alan Clark Diaries.

== Personal life ==
On 25 July 1953, Armstrong married Serena Mary Benedicta Chance, daughter of Sir Roger James Ferguson Chance, and Mary Georgina Rowney. Armstrong and his wife had two daughters. This marriage ended in divorce, and in 1985 he married Mary Patricia Carlow, daughter of Charles Cyril Carlow.

== Death ==
Armstrong died at his home in Ashill, Somerset, on 3 April 2020 at the age of 93.

== Bibliography ==
- (1997). The Future of the National Art Library: A Pamphlet Concerning the Victoria and Albert Museum's Responsibility Towards the Documentation of the History of Art and Design

== Arms ==
Coat of arms of Robert Armstrong, Baron Armstrong of Ilminster

Coronet
A Coronet of a Baron
Crest
A Chough wings elevated and addorsed proper grasping in the dexter foot a Penner attached thereto two Cords reflexed over the back and terminating in an Inkhorn Or
Escutcheon
Paly of four Gules and Sable three lilies slipped in pale Argent between four Arms embowed in Armour issuing from the flanks Or
Supporters
On either side a Black and White Cat reguardant proper gorged with a Plain Collar Or
Motto
SUAVITER IN MODO, FORTITER IN RE (Gentle in manner, vigorous in action)
Badge
Three Arms embowed in Armour conjoined at the shoulder Or the hands gauntleted in pall reversed each grasping a Lily slipped Argent

== See also ==
- Baron Armstrong

Government offices
Preceded by Alexander Isserlis	Principal Private Secretary to the Prime Minister; 1970–1975	Succeeded by Sir Kenneth Stowe
Preceded by Sir Arthur Peterson	Permanent Under-Secretary of State for the Home Department; 1977–1979	Succeeded by Sir Brian Cubbon
Preceded by Sir John Hunt	Cabinet Secretary; 1979–1987	Succeeded by Sir Robin Butler
Preceded by Sir Douglas Allen	Head of the Home Civil Service; 1981–1987; With: Sir Douglas Wass (1981–1983)	Succeeded by Sir Robin Butler
