= International finance centre =

International Finance Centre, or International Financial Centre, or IFC may refer to one of the following:

== Finance hub ==
- Financial centre
  - Dubai International Financial Centre
  - Qatar Financial Centre
  - GIFT International Financial Services Centre
  - Astana International Financial Centre
  - Kigali International Financial Centre
  - International Financial Services Centre, Dublin
  - Vietnam International Financial Centre
- Offshore financial centre

== Buildings ==
- International Finance Centre (Hong Kong)
- International Finance Center Seoul
- Busan International Finance Center
  - Busan International Finance Center–Busan Bank Station
- Guangzhou International Finance Center
- Chongqing Tall Tower, formerly JW Marriott International Finance Centre
- Ping An Finance Centre
- Rose Rock International Finance Center
- Shanghai IFC
- Shenyang International Finance Center
- Suzhou IFS, formally Suzhou International Financial Square
- International Financial Center Jakarta
- IFC One Saigon
- Taipei 101, formerly Taipei World Financial Center

== See also ==
- Chongqing International Trade and Commerce Center
- International Commerce Centre
