= Nigel Wicks =

British financier (born 1940)

Sir Nigel Wicks GCB CVO CBE

Principal Private Secretary to the Prime Minister
- In office 1985–1988
- Prime Minister: Margaret Thatcher
- Preceded by: Robin Butler
- Succeeded by: Andrew Turnbull

Personal details
- Born: Nigel Leonard Wicks; 16 June 1940 (age 85)
- Children: 3
- Education: Beckenham and Penge Grammar School
- Alma mater: Portsmouth College of Technology
- Occupation: Finance
- Awards: CBE (1979); CVO (1989); KCB (1992); GCB (1999)

Sir Nigel Leonard Wicks GCB CVO CBE (born 16 June 1940) is a British financier and former senior British civil servant. He also served as Chairman of Euroclear Group.

== Career ==
Educated originally at Beckenham and Penge Grammar School, Wicks joined BP in 1958 at the age of 18. Whilst at BP, Wicks studied for a University of London external MA in business administration at the Portsmouth College of Technology, now part of the University of Portsmouth.

After 10 years at BP, Wicks joined HM Treasury in 1968. At the Treasury, Wicks undertook a number of positions including secondments to the Prime Minister's Office as a Private Secretary to the Prime Minister (1975–1978, under Callaghan and Wilson) and at the British Embassy in Washington, D.C. as Economic Minister (and so the UK's Executive Director of the IMF and IBRD) from 1983–1985.

In 1985, Wicks took up his position as Principal Private Secretary to the Prime Minister, Margaret Thatcher, a post he held for three years until returning to the Treasury as Second Permanent Secretary with responsibility for International Finance, where he remained for twelve years until reaching mandatory retirement age in 2000. After Wicks' retirement, the Treasury's International Finance command was merged into that of Macro-Economic Policy, led by Gus O'Donnell (later The Lord O'Donnell).

After retirement, Wicks moved into finance; he served as Chairman of CRESTCo for a year from 2001 until it merged with Euroclear, where he was Deputy chairman 2002–2006 and since then as chairman. Wicks also served as a non-executive director of Morgan Stanley for three years from 2004, and of the Edinburgh Investment Trust since 2005.

In public appointments, Wicks was appointed Chairman of the Committee on Standards in Public Life from 2001–2004, as Chair of the panel appointing the initial members of the then-new Judicial Appointments Commission in 2005, and since 2007 has been Commissioner of the Jersey Financial Services Commission.

In October 2012, Wicks was appointed chairman of the British Bankers' Association.

== Personal life ==
As well as his MA degree from the University of London, Wicks holds an MA degree from the University of Cambridge, and honorary LLD degrees from the Universities of Bath and Portsmouth. He is married with three sons.

Wicks was appointed a Commander of the Order of the British Empire (CBE) in Prime Minister Callaghan's Resignation Honours list in 1979, a Commander of the Royal Victorian Order (CVO) in the 1989 New Year Honours, and a Knight Commander (KCB) in the 1992 New Year Honours, and then promoted to a Knight Grand Cross of the Order of the Bath (GCB) in the 1999 New Year Honours.

== Positions held ==
Diplomatic posts
| Unknown | Economic Minister, British Embassy in Washington, D.C. 1983–1985 | Unknown |
Government offices
| Preceded by Robin Butler | Principal Private Secretary to the Prime Minister; 1985–1988 | Succeeded by Andrew Turnbull |
| Preceded by Robin Butler | Second Permanent Secretary, HM Treasury; 1988–2000 | Succeeded by Gus O'Donnell as managing director, Macro-Economic; Policy and International Finance |
| Preceded by The Lord Neill of Bladen | Chairman of the Committee on Standards in Public Life; 2001–2004 | Succeeded by Sir Alistair Graham |
Business positions
| Preceded by Scott Dobbie | Chairman, CRESTCo; 2001–2002 | Succeeded by Pierre Francotte as Chairman, Euroclear UK & Ireland |
| New title Position created after merger with CRESTCo | Deputy Chairman, Euroclear Group; 2002–2005 | Succeeded by Jean-Jacques Verdickt |
| Preceded by Chris Tupker | Chairman, Euroclear Group; 2006–2012 | Succeeded by Marc Antoine Autheman |
| Preceded by Marcus Agius | Chairman, British Bankers Association; 2012– | Incumbent |
