= Alexander Maxwell (civil servant) =

British civil servant (1880 – 1963)

Sir Alexander Maxwell GCB KBE

Permanent Under-Secretary of State for the Home Department
- In office 1938–1948
- Preceded by: Sir Russell Scott
- Succeeded by: Sir Frank Newsam

Personal details
- Born: 9 March 1880 Sharston Mount, Northen Etchells, Cheshire, England
- Died: 1 July 1963 (aged 83) Coldharbour, Surrey, England
- Education: Plymouth College; Christ Church, Oxford
- Occupation: Civil servant

Sir Alexander Maxwell GCB KBE (9 March 1880 – 1 July 1963) was a British civil servant notable for his service as Permanent Under-Secretary of State at the Home Office from 1938 to 1948.

== Early life and education ==
Alexander Maxwell was born at Sharston Mount, Northen Etchells, Cheshire, on 9 March 1880, the eldest son of the Revd Joseph Matthew Townsend Maxwell, a Congregational minister, and his wife, Louisa Maria Brely Snell, a Quaker GP. He was educated at Plymouth College before going up to Christ Church, Oxford. He obtained first classes in honour moderations in 1901 and literae humaniores in 1903. He won the Matthew Arnold Memorial Prize in 1904 and the chancellor's English essay prize in 1905.

== Early career ==
Maxwell joined the Home Office in 1904, where he was private secretary to successive secretaries of state. In 1917 Maxwell was acting chief inspector of reformatory and industrial schools and it was probably at this time that he became interested in delinquency. In 1924 he was made an assistant secretary and in 1928 when he became chairman of the Prison Commission. He worked closely with Alexander Paterson on the concept of the open borstal; the idea was Paterson's but the administration was done by Maxwell. The first open borstal was started in 1930 at Lowdham Grange in Nottinghamshire. In 1932 Maxwell became deputy under-secretary of state at the Home Office.

== Permanent Secretary ==
In 1938, when Sir Samuel Hoare was home secretary, Maxwell was promoted to permanent under-secretary. He held the post for the next ten years, during which he became the most prominent and respected member of the department. Jenifer Margaret Hart, Maxwell's private secretary from 1939, stated that he had a fervent belief that the Home Office had important duty to safeguard liberty. Years later, Sir Samuel, then Viscount Templewood, would write:

Alexander Maxwell in particular helped me with wise and stimulating advice. How lucky I was to have him!… Unruffled amidst all the alarms and excursions that periodically shake a Ministry of public order, he possessed the imperturbable assurance essential to a department of historic traditions.

— Viscount Templewood (1954). Nine Troubled Years. p. 229.

During the Second World War he worked to try and trammel, as much as possible, the state's restrictions on civil liberties. He dealt with the imprisonment of enemy aliens and the treatment of those detained under the Defence Regulation 18B in addition to having to deal with the Mosleys. It was on his advice that the government in 1940 sent out Paterson to sift those detainees whose sympathies were genuinely with the Allied cause. Jenifer Margaret Hart, Maxwell's private secretary from 1939, stated that he had a fervent belief that the Home Office had important duty to safeguard liberty.

On 10 July 1940 the Security Executive, in response to communist propaganda against various government departments, approached the Home Office to consider the drafting of a new defence regulation making it an offence to attempt to subvert duly constituted authority. Maxwell and Sir Horace Wilson were against the idea and Maxwell wrote to the Home Secretary, Sir John Anderson, with a minute on the 6 September 1940 that exemplified his libertarian ideals:

There would be widespread opposition to such a Regulation as inconsistent with the historic notions of English liberty. Our tradition is that while orders issued by the duly constituted authority must be obeyed, every civilian is at liberty to show, if he can, that such orders are silly or mischievous and the duly constituted authorities are composed of fools or rogues… Accordingly we do not regard activities which are designed to bring the duly constituted authorities into contempt as necessarily subversive; they are only subversive if they are calculated to incite persons to disobey the law, or to change the Government by unconstitutional means. This doctrine gives, of course, great and indeed dangerous liberty to persons who desire revolution, or desire to impede the war effort… but the readiness to take this risk is the cardinal distinction between democracy and totalitarianism.

— Hinsley, F. H. & Simkins, C. A. G. (1990). British Intelligence in the Second World War. Vol IV (Security and Counter-Intelligence). HMSO. pp. 57-58.

On 10 August 1948 it was announced that Maxwell was to retire at the end of September, and that Sir Frank Newsam had been appointed to follow him as Permanent Secretary at the Home Office. In retirement Maxwell was a member of the royal commission on capital punishment in 1949.

== Personal life ==
Maxwell married Dr Jessie McNaughten Campbell, daughter of the Revd John Campbell, of Kirkcaldy, at the Friends’ meeting-house at Jordans, Buckinghamshire on 19 August 1919. The couple had two sons. From 1948 to 1950 he was governor of Bedford College. He died on 1 July 1963 at his home, Chasemores, Coldharbour, near Dorking, Surrey. His wife survived him.

== Honours ==
Maxwell was appointed Companion of the Order of the Bath (CB) in 1924, Knight Commander of the Order of the British Empire (KBE) in 1936, Knight Commander of the Order of the Bath (KCB) in 1939, and Knight Grand Cross of the Order of the Bath (GCB) in 1945.

Government offices
Preceded by Sir Russell Scott	Permanent Under-Secretary of State for the Home Department; 1938–1948	Succeeded by Sir Frank Newsam
