= Edward Troup =

Edward Troup may refer to:

- Sir Edward Troup (civil servant, born 1857) (1857–1941), British civil servant
- Sir Edward Troup (solicitor) (born 1955), British solicitor and civil servant
