= Jersey Finance =

Jersey financial services body

- Jersey Finance Limited
- Formation: 2001
- Type: Not-for-profit financial services industry body
- Registration no.: 78049
- Purpose: Promotion of Jersey as an international finance centre
- Headquarters: St Helier, Jersey
- Region served: International
- Members: Financial services firms
- Chairman: Jason Laity
- Chief executive officer: Joe Moynihan

Jersey Finance is a not-for-profit organisation that represents and promotes the financial services industry in Jersey. It is a private company, Jersey Finance Limited, and is funded by subscriptions from financial services firms and by a grant from the Government of Jersey.

== History ==
Jersey Finance was formed in 2001, following changes to the structure of financial services regulation in Jersey. Its creation followed the Edwards Report on financial regulation in the Crown Dependencies, which recommended that the role of promoting the finance industry should be separate from that of the regulator. The Jersey Financial Services Commission remains the island's financial services regulator.

== Role ==
The Government of Jersey identifies Jersey Finance as the promotional body for Jersey's financial services industry, alongside other economic development bodies such as Digital Jersey and Locate Jersey. Jersey Finance's activities include marketing Jersey as an international finance centre, producing industry research and statistics, organising events, and contributing to consultations on financial services law and policy.

== Organisation and funding ==
Jersey Finance is incorporated as a private company, Jersey Finance Ltd. It is owned by the Jersey Finance Trust.

In 2025, Jersey Finance reported total income of £8.9 million and expenditure of £9.1 million, producing a deficit of £115,486. Government of Jersey grant funding totalled £7.4 million, comprising £5.89 million in core funding and £1.51 million in designated project funding. Membership fees generated £1.27 million in the same year.

== Public debate ==
Jersey Finance has taken part in wider debates about offshore finance, tax transparency and the economic role of international finance centres. In 2018, The Guardian reported that Jersey Finance had provided financial support for an Institute of Economic Affairs report defending offshore financial centres; Jersey Finance said that the support came from the Jersey financial services sector.

== See also ==
- Economy of Jersey
- Financial services in Jersey
- Jersey Financial Services Commission
- Government of Jersey
