= JFSC =

JFSC may refer to:

- Jersey Financial Services Commission
- Joint Forces Staff College in Norfolk, Virginia
