= Jenifer Hart =

British civil servant and historian (1914–2005)

Jenifer Hart (née Jenifer Margaret Fischer Williams; 31 January 1914 – 19 March 2005) was an English senior civil servant, historian and academic. In later life she was accused of having formerly been a spy for the Soviet Union, a claim she denied.

== Biography ==
Jenifer Fischer Williams was the third of the five daughters of (Eleanor) Marjorie Hay (née Murray, 1880–1961), a descendant of John Murray, third Duke of Atholl, and Sir John Fischer Williams (1870-1947), an eminent international law specialist. Her father worked for a time in France, where Hart received her early education at the Lycée Molière and Cours Fénelon in Paris. She later attended Downe House School, Newbury. In 1932, she entered Somerville College, Oxford, where she studied history, graduating with a first class degree in 1935. Her sister was Judith Hubback.

In 1933, she joined the Communist Party of Great Britain. Three years later she joined the Civil Service, after achieving better marks in the examinations than any woman had previously done (it still being unusual for a woman even to aspire to a career in the Civil Service). She became private secretary to the Permanent Under-Secretary at the Home Office, Sir Alexander Maxwell.

She married the legal philosopher Herbert Hart in 1941 and resigned from the Civil Service in 1945 when he became a Fellow of New College, Oxford. She later became a research fellow at Nuffield College, Oxford and a Fellow of St Anne's College, Oxford, where she remained until 1981; she admitted her disappointment at not having become Principal. Her pupils included Rose Dugdale. Hart was for a time a university representative on Oxford City Council. Her husband became Principal of Brasenose College, Oxford in 1973.

== Spying allegations ==
Although Hart admitted to having had a meeting with spymaster Arnold Deutsch early in her career, she claimed not to have been recruited or passed any confidential information to him or to other Communist Party members. In 1983, an edition of the BBC's Timewatch programme revealed that she had been interviewed in the 1960s by Peter Wright and others about her political activities, and this led to controversy since her husband was himself a former intelligence officer.

The BBC revelations about her Communist associations led to an article in The Sunday Times, referring to her as "a Russian spy". She and her husband threatened to sue the paper, which later printed an apology. Herbert Hart had a nervous breakdown shortly afterwards, which was attributed to the stress of the situation.

== Personal life and death ==
Jenifer and Herbert Hart had four children: a daughter and three sons. Their youngest son, Jacob, was brain-damaged at birth and Hart formed a strong relationship with him. Hart's granddaughter Mojo Mathers nee Mojo Minrod, who was made deaf due to oxygen deprivation prior to her birth in 1966, became New Zealand's first deaf MP in 2011.

Herbert Hart admitted having little interest in sex, and suspected that Jenifer had affairs with Sir Isaiah Berlin and other men.

With her younger sister, Mariella, Hart inherited her parents' home, Lamledra, in Cornwall, to which her parents had retired.

On 19 March 2005, Hart died of heart failure at Radcliffe Infirmary, Oxford. She was 91.

== Works ==
- The British Police (1951)
- Proportional Representation: critics of the British electoral system 1820–1945 (1992)
- Ask Me No More: An Autobiography (1998)
