= Frank Newsam =

British civil servant

Sir Frank Aubrey Newsam, GCB, KBE, CVO, MC (13 November 1893 – 25 April 1964) was a British civil servant notable for his service as Permanent Under-Secretary of State at the Home Office from 1948 to 1957, although he had been a central figure for many years previously. His strong leadership abilities had a dominating effect on the character of his department, in which he served for all but a few months of his career. His principal interest during this time was the Police service, for which he created the Police Staff College at Bramshill. At his best in a crisis, his contribution to the recovery after the North Sea flood of 1953 was particularly praised.

A man of great energy and drive, Newsam's tendency to be impatient with those who disagreed with him meant that he was not automatically popular with the Home Secretaries under whom he worked. However, his negotiating ability was superb, and he allowed himself time to enjoy the finer things in life. His eventual successor Philip Allen regarded him as operating in the tradition of preserving the liberty of the subject wherever possible; those who had worked under him also noted his highly prized commitment to keeping the politicians in charge of the department out of trouble at all costs.

== Education and war service ==
Newsam was born in Barbados, where his father William Elias Newsam held a post in the British Colonial Service. He went to school at Harrison College in Barbados, and then won an open scholarship in classics to St John's College, Oxford in 1911. Newsam graduated in 1915 with second classes in each of Mods and Greats, his failure to take a first being later ascribed to his desire to enjoy life while at university.

Newsam (who had been a member of the Inns of Court Officers' Training Corps) was then commissioned as a Second Lieutenant in the Royal Irish Regiment. He saw active service in Ireland and was wounded during the Easter Rising in 1916; during the First World War he served in Belgium, France, the Punjab and Afghanistan.

In September 1918, while a Lieutenant, he was awarded the Military Cross; the citation referred to him going "forward collecting all stragglers and reorganising the line when one of the companies commenced to retire", so restoring the offensive capability of his unit.

Late in the war, Newsam served with the first battalion of the 30th Punjabis in India (in October 1919 he was promoted to the rank of Captain in the Indian Army Reserve of Officers). He served again in Ireland after the armistice, but after demobilisation in 1919 he joined the teaching staff at Harrow School under Dr Lionel Ford. Newsam was at Harrow for only a brief period while waiting for the result of the Class I Competition for the Home Civil Service. In July 1920 he was informed that he had passed, and he then joined the Children's Division of the Home Office.

== Early career ==
Newsam made his mark in the division, and in 1924 was picked by the then Permanent Secretary Sir John Anderson, as Anderson's own private secretary. Having come to trust Newsam's abilities, Anderson retained him in this post despite Newsam's promotion to principal in 1925. There were some who saw him as a "power behind the throne" in assisting Anderson.

In 1927, Anderson placed Newsam in an even more pivotal post as Principal Private Secretary to the Secretary of State for Home Affairs (Home Secretary) – responsible for administering the office of the political head of the department. Newsam held this key position for over five years, assisting Home Secretaries William Joynson-Hicks, J. R. Clynes, Sir Herbert Samuel, and Sir John Gilmour. Especially after Anderson left in 1932 (his successor Sir Russell Scott came from the Treasury with little knowledge of the operation of the Home Office), no other civil servant rivalled his experience. For his part, Newsam learned a great deal about the operations of senior politicians and of Parliament.

== Assistant secretary ==
A round of changes in civil service appointments at the Home Office in June 1933 saw Newsam, now promoted to assistant secretary, take charge of a new division. His first responsibility was to guide into law the Betting and Lotteries Act 1934, but he soon began to handle other sensitive matters. He was also appointed Commander of the Royal Victorian Order in the 1933 Queen's Birthday Honours. Newsam sat on a departmental committee of inquiry into Firearms in 1934, and this was followed by the problem of addressing the disorder caused by fighting between members of the British Union of Fascists and its opponents. Newsam played a large role in devising and then implementing the Public Order Act 1936, which banned all political uniforms and was seen as effective in returning order to the streets.

== World War II ==
1938 saw Newsam moved to take charge of the criminal division, where he began preparations for a major Criminal Justice Bill; however the advancing threat of war led to it being put off (in the event, most of the provisions were enacted in the Criminal Justice Act 1948). Late in 1938, Newsam was selected as Principal Officer in the South Eastern Civil Defence region; this role meant that should war break out, he would be Chief of Staff to the Regional Commissioner. He duly took up his post in September 1939 but after only a few months in Tunbridge Wells, he was recalled to London to take charge of the criminal and aliens divisions, now with the rank of Assistant Under-Secretary of State.

In April 1941 Newsam's appointment to Deputy Under-Secretary of State was announced. He was now the second most senior civil servant in the Home Office and had a special responsibility for security.

Newsam negotiated with the United States how to handle criminal offences committed by American soldiers in the United Kingdom, the agreement being enacted in the United States of America (Visiting Forces) Act 1942. With the Home Office responsible for relations with the Crown Dependencies, Newsam drew up plans for the restoration of life in the Channel Islands once German occupation was ended. Newsam's plans were subsequently put into effect in 1945, and led to a long association with the islands where he helped reform constitutions and develop their legal and administrative systems.

Having been in charge of internment of enemy aliens and suspected fascist sympathisers under Defence Regulation 18B, Newsam had in 1944 to consider the vexed question of what to do with the 'Red Book' containing the membership list from Archibald Maule Ramsay's 'Right Club', after Ramsay was released from detention. After discussing the question with a colleague, the idea came up that it may be necessary to illegally destroy the book and then take the chance that Ramsay would get only token damages out of any legal action that might ensue. In the end, the book was returned to Ramsay.

Newsam was appointed Knight Commander of the Order of the British Empire in the New Year Honours.

=== Policing ===
It was towards the end of the war that Newsam's particular interest in the police force began to take shape. His first task was to reform the large number of very small police forces, as many municipal boroughs that were not especially large had a separate constabulary. Wartime powers had forced some to amalgamate, but Newsam needed to go further. Conscious that a Whitehall takeover was feared, in May 1945 he spoke to the conference of the Chief Constables' Association to reassure them that there would be no regional or national police forces. He eventually drafted the Police Act 1946 which abolished nearly all the borough police forces outside County boroughs, and allowed for more amalgamations. Once the Act was passed, Newsam again reassured the police that there was no question of regionalisation or nationalisation because "such an idea is an anathema to the Home Office".

Meanwhile, Newsam also looked into the whole policing service from 1944, and became personally committed to the idea of establishing a national staff college for the police. He saw that the project found the land needed for its buildings (at Bramshill, near Hartley Wintney in Hampshire), and became the founder chairman of the Board of Governors of the Police Staff College in 1947. He retained this role for the rest of his career.

== Permanent secretary ==
On 10 August 1948 it was announced that Sir Alexander Maxwell was to retire at the end of September, and that Newsam had been appointed to follow him as permanent secretary at the Home Office. In effect this was a delayed promotion; Newsam was already 54, and might easily have reached the rank earlier. At first he had to deal with Chuter Ede as Home Secretary, with whom he had an uneasy relationship (Ede was believed not to trust Newsam's judgment). With Ede maintaining control over the department, Newsam had to deal with routine matters including presenting evidence to the Royal Commission on Betting, Lotteries and Gaming.

However Newsam did make an important contribution to British relations with Northern Ireland after Taoiseach John A. Costello revealed his government's intention to declare Ireland a Republic. In discussions in December 1948, Newsam first suggested passing a law declaring that Northern Ireland could not be removed from the United Kingdom without the consent of the Parliament of Northern Ireland. Such a provision was included in the Ireland Act 1949. He was appointed Knight Commander of the Order of the Bath in the 1950 New Year Honours.

== Conservative government ==
After the Conservatives returned to government in 1951, Newsam's activity and knowledge of his department enabled him to assert himself and he was thought to have almost eclipsed the Home Secretaries who were nominally superior. Newsam preferred to deal direct with the Home Secretary, eschewing even the junior Ministers in the department. In 1954, Newsam accepted the invitation to write a book explaining the work of the Home Office for "The New Whitehall Series", a series intended "to provide authoritative descriptions of the present work of the major Departments of the Central Government" published by George Allen & Unwin Ltd; his was the first to appear.

=== Capital punishment ===
One of Newsam's principal concerns was the operation of capital punishment. While Deputy Under-Secretary he had strongly advised against reprieving John Amery, son of a leading Conservative politician who had pleaded guilty to treason during World War II; he believed that reprieving Amery would be a weak move that would look like a political fix. He also opposed a reprieve for William Joyce (nicknamed Lord Haw-Haw), convicted of treason for propaganda broadcasting during the war. In 1949 Newsam gave evidence for the Home Office at the Royal Commission on Capital Punishment under Sir Ernest Gowers, largely defending the established system.

Once he became Permanent Secretary, Newsam had personal involvement in the process whereby the Home Secretary decided whether to reprieve those condemned to death; for instance, he signed the letters informing the prisoners' families of the Home Secretary's decision.

He also received the families and legal representatives of those condemned to death while they pleaded for a reprieve from the Home Secretary. On 12 July 1955, Newsam was summoned back from Ascot Racecourse to meet Ruth Ellis' solicitor who wished to present new evidence. In another murder case, William Bentley wrote that Newsam spent an hour with him and his daughter while they related the difficult medical history of his condemned son Derek Bentley, and that "Sir Frank listened sympathetically, but made no comment". Material released by the Public Record Office in 1992 revealed that Newsam had argued for a reprieve with the words "My own view is towards leniency". Philip Allen later wrote that Newsam was "gravely concerned" when Home Secretary David Maxwell Fyfe disregarded his recommendation and refused to reprieve Bentley.

As a civil servant, Newsam's own views on capital punishment were not public. Long after Newsam's death, an academic journal article reported three separate views of people who knew Newsam well, all of whom believed that he supported retaining capital punishment. Towards the end of his career, Newsam developed the important distinction between capital and non-capital murder, which was enacted in the Homicide Act 1957.

=== Emergency planning ===
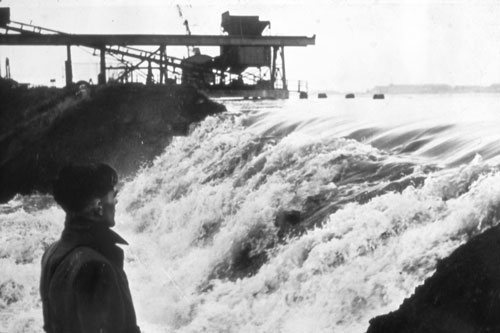
Sea defences are breached at Erith during the 1953 flood.

The Home Office had the responsibility of dealing with any civil emergency matter which might arise, and Newsam took personal charge as chairman of the official committee on emergencies. In 1953 the storm tide of the North Sea caused severe flooding along the East coast; Newsam controlled the direction of all the resources of the government in repairing sea defences and homes, including taking charge of very large numbers of troops who provided an emergency workforce. Rab Butler wrote that he "had almost literally taken charge of the country" and "secured achievements that would have surprised Canute".

The main business of the emergencies committee was to cope with strikes, and here Newsam was cautious that the Government should not intervene incorrectly or excessively (particularly if asked to call out troops), because the likely effect would be to cause the strike to spread. Newsam was thought to have been at his best in an emergency when he had to be decisive and authoritative. On 1 July 1955 he was appointed Knight of the Venerable Order of Saint John.

=== Other issues ===
In 1954 Newsam was caught up in a diplomatic incident over Antoni Klimowicz, a 24-year-old Polish man who stowed away on the ship Jarosław Dąbrowski and attempted to go ashore in London and claim asylum. Klimowicz was spotted by the crew and detained on the ship. Newsam sent Home Office lawyers to obtain a writ of habeas corpus and then arranged for 120 police officers, led in person by the Commissioner of Police of the Metropolis (Sir John Nott-Bower) to board the ship and rescue Klimowicz on 31 July. The Polish Embassy protested, but Klimowicz was allowed to stay.

However Newsam's intervention in another matter was less successful: in late 1956 Home Secretary Gwilym Lloyd George accepted Newsam's advice and authorised the telephone tapping of Billy Hill, a known criminal. At the time gang warfare had broken out in London between Hill and rival gangster Jack Spot. The Bar council approached the police and requested the tapes in order to provide evidence for an investigation into the professional conduct of Hill's barrister, Patrick Marrinan.

When this use of tapping powers was revealed in June 1957 (by which time Rab Butler had succeeded Lloyd George), there was a major row with the Leader of the Opposition Hugh Gaitskell demanding a full explanation. Butler pledged that it would not be a precedent and that he would consider withdrawing the evidence and asking the Bar council to disregard it. Marrinan was subsequently disbarred and expelled by Lincoln's Inn, but Butler was forced to appoint a committee of Privy Counsellors under Sir Norman Birkett to look into the prerogative power of intercepting telephone communications.

== Retirement ==
When Rab Butler arrived at the Home Office, he quickly decided that his own wish to take charge and reform the department was likely to bring him into conflict with Newsam. He quietly persuaded Newsam to retire. For his part Newsam was well beyond normal retirement age for a civil servant and accepted, fixing his last day in office as 30 September 1957. A few days after his retirement was announced, Newsam was promoted Knight Grand Cross of the Order of the Bath in the Queen's Birthday Honours.

In retirement, Newsam was commissioned by the British Medical Association to report into whether it was realistic for doctors to withdraw from the National Health Service should their pay demand be rejected. He found that the threat to withdraw was unrealistic, and that public opinion would not easily forgive a move on behalf of doctors to undermine the NHS. Newsam's conclusion was unwelcome to the BMA which officially dissociated itself from it. He also served on the police committee of the British Transport Commission. Newsam's health had begun to decline during his last years in office, and he died of cancer at his home in Paddington on 25 April 1964. His name lived on as the Police Staff College inaugurated the 'Frank Newsam Memorial Lectures' on criminal justice matters.

== Character ==
Newsam was described by Philip Allen, who served under him, as a "born leader" and a superb chairman of any meeting, with a strong personality which tended to drive his solutions forward. He was a good negotiator, but Allen and others agreed that Newsam could show impatience and intolerance if other people disagreed with him. While a very good professional administrator, his interest was not in organisation but in problem-solving. In speech he was said to be eloquent and able to produce surprising pieces of knowledge; and several comment on the fact that he had good looks which suggested foreign origins. Newsam enjoyed gambling on horse-racing and enjoyed high living; he was known to drink a great deal.

Newsam's wife Janet, whom he married in December 1927, was from South Africa. She left London to live in Wylye, Wiltshire during World War II, and liked the countryside so much that she never returned to live in London. Newsam saw her most weekends but remained living in London after he retired; the couple remained very friendly but did not see much of each other, and they had no children.

Government offices
Preceded by Sir Alexander Maxwell	Permanent Under-Secretary of State at the Home Office; 1948–1957	Succeeded by Sir Charles Cunningham
