= Gieve =

Gieve may refer to:

- John Gieve (born 1950), British civil servant
- Gieve Patel (1940–2023), Indian poet, playwright, painter and physician

== See also ==
- Gieves & Hawkes, a bespoke men's tailor and menswear retailer in Savile Row, London
