= Peter Kemp (civil servant) =

English civil servant (1934–2008)

Sir Edward Peter Kemp, KCB (10 October 1934 – 24 June 2008), commonly known as Peter Kemp, was an English civil servant.

Kemp was educated at Millfield School, which he left in 1949. An early career in the Royal Navy was cut short by illness and he followed this up with work as an accountant. Kemp entered the civil service in 1967; promoted to deputy secretary at HM Treasury in 1983, in 1988 he was made Second Permanent Secretary at in the Office of the Minister for the Civil Service at the Cabinet Office (in 1992, this became the Office of Public Service and Science); in the role, he had responsibility for implementing the Next Steps reforms which separated administrative and policy work from delivery by creating government agencies. He left the civil service in 1992.

Government offices
Preceded by Dame Anne Mueller as Second Permanent Secretary, Cabinet Office Management and Personnel Office	Second Permanent Secretary of the Office of the Minister for the Civil Service; 1988–1992	Succeeded by himself as Permanent Secretary, Office for Public Service and Science
Preceded by himself as Second Permanent Secretary, Office of the Minister for the Civil Service	Permanent Secretary of the Office for Public Service and Science; 1992	Succeeded by Sir Richard Mottram
