= Charles Cunningham (civil servant) =

Scottish civil servant (1906–1998)

Sir Charles Craik Cunningham, GCB, KBE, CVO (7 May 1906 – 7 July 1998) was a Scottish civil servant. From 1957 to 1966, he was Permanent Under-Secretary of State at the Home Office, its most senior civil servant. He had worked in the Scottish Office from 1929 until moving to the Home Office in 1957, and served as Secretary of the Scottish Home Department between 1948 and 1957.

== Early life and education ==
Cunningham was born on 7 May 1906 in Dundee, Scotland. He was educated at Harris Academy, a selective state school in Dundee. He studied at the University of St Andrews.

== Honours ==
In the 1941 New Year Honours, Cunningham was appointed a Commander of the Royal Victorian Order (CVO). In the 1946 King's Birthday Honours, he was appointed a Companion of the Order of the Bath (CB) in recognition of his service as Deputy Secretary of the Scottish Home Department. In the 1952 New Year Honours, he was appointed a Knight Commander of the Order of the British Empire (KBE) in recognition of his service as Secretary of the Scottish Home Department, and thereby granted the title sir. In the 1961 Queen's Birthday Honours, he was promoted to Knight Commander of the Order of the Bath (KCB) in recognition of his service as Permanent Under-Secretary of State at the Home Office. In the 1974 New Year Honours, he was promoted to Knight Grand Cross of the Order of the Bath (GCB) "for public services".

Government offices
Preceded by Sir Frank Newsam	Permanent Under-Secretary of State for the Home Department; 1957 to 1966	Succeeded by Sir Philip Allen
