= Brian Cubbon =

British senior civil servant

Sir Brian Crossland Cubbon GCB (9 April 1928 – 20 May 2015) was a British senior civil servant and a member of the Charter Compliance Panel of the Press Complaints Commission.

== Biography ==
Cubbon was born in Oswaldtwistle, Lancashire on 9 April 1928. His father, Edward Moore Cubbon was a primary school teacher and his mother was Anita Jane, née Crossland. Cubbon was educated at Bury Grammar School under a scholarship and went on to study Classics at Trinity College, Cambridge, graduating in 1949. He spent a while in the Royal Electrical and Mechanical Engineers for national service.

He became Permanent Under Secretary of State (the senior civil servant in charge of a Government department) of the Northern Ireland Office from 1976 to 1979 and Permanent Under-Secretary of State at the Home Office from 1979 to 1988. He was a Press Complaints Commission Commissioner from 1995 to 2002.

Cubbon was injured in an IRA bomb explosion in which the British Ambassador to Ireland, Christopher Ewart-Biggs, was killed in 1976. The car in which the party was travelling was blown up by a bomb concealed in a culvert under the road. Cubbon's Private Secretary, Judith Cooke, was also killed, and the driver, Brian O'Driscoll, was injured.

He married art teacher, Lorin Richardson on 20 October 1956 and they had four children. He was appointed Companion of the Order of the Bath (CB) in 1974, Knight Commander (KCB) in 1977 and Knight Grand Cross of the Order of the Bath (GCB) 1984, the highest rank of the Order of the Bath. He died of a heart attack on 20 May 2015 at the age of 87.

== Arms ==
Coat of arms of Brian Cubbon

Notes
Granted by the College of Arms, 21st January 2002.
Crest
Three oast houses abutting Gules the cowls and fingers Argent.
Torse
Argent and Azure.
Escutcheon
Argent a pall cotised gyronny of six Azure and Gules the Azure formy.
Supporters
On either side a gibbon the exterior limbs raised the dexter Gules the sinister Azure.
Motto
Domus Libertas

Government offices
Preceded by Sir Robert Armstrong	Permanent Under-Secretary of State for the Home Department; 1979–1988	Succeeded by Sir Clive Whitmore
