= Kenneth Stowe =

British civil servant

Sir Kenneth Stowe GCB CVO

Principal Private Secretary to the Prime Minister
- In office 1975–1979
- Prime Minister: Harold Wilson; James Callaghan; Margaret Thatcher
- Preceded by: Robert Armstrong
- Succeeded by: Clive Whitmore

Personal details
- Born: Kenneth Ronald Stowe; 17 July 1927 Dagenham, Essex
- Died: 29 August 2015 (aged 88) Lingen, Herefordshire
- Spouse: Joan Frances Randall Cullen (m. 1949–1995)
- Children: 3
- Education: Dagenham County High School
- Alma mater: Exeter College, Oxford
- Occupation: Civil servant
- Awards: CB (1977); CVO (1979); KCB (1980); GCB (1986)

Sir Kenneth Ronald Stowe GCB CVO (17 July 1927 – 29 August 2015) was a senior British civil servant. He was Principal Private Secretary to the Prime Minister (1975–79), and the Permanent Under-Secretary of State of the Northern Ireland Office (1979–81). From 1981-87, he was Permanent Secretary of the Department of Health and Social Security. He was made a CB in 1977, CVO in 1979, and KCB in 1980 and a GCB in 1986.

== Biography ==
Stowe was born in Dagenham, Essex on 17 July 1927. His father, Arthur Percy Stowe, was a maker of spectacles. His mother was Emmie Louise Webb. His parents married in 1926.

Stowe attended Dagenham County High School and studied history, under a scholarship, at Exeter College, Oxford.

On 20 August 1949, Stowe married Joan Frances Randall Cullen, a teacher, in Essex. The couple went on to have two sons and a daughter. He was left a widower in 1995.

Stowe graduated in 1951, he joined the civil service's National Assistance Board (later to become the Ministry of Social Security), working directly with those people who were asking for help. In 1973, he began employment as under-secretary at the Cabinet Office in the Legislation Committee. When Robert Armstrong moved on in 1975, he was recommended to Harold Wilson as Principal Private Secretary to the Prime Minister. He remained in the role for four years, serving under Harold Wilson, James Callaghan and for the first few months of Margaret Thatcher's premiership.

Thatcher appointed Stowe as Permanent Under-Secretary of State of the Northern Ireland Office in 1979, where he brokered an agreement during the 1980 hunger strike at Maze prison, although it did not hold. He became permanent secretary for the Department of Health and Social Security in 1981, responsible for over a million individuals in the NHS and social services departments.

After retirement in 1987, Stowe spent a period advising public service reform in Zimbabwe and South Africa, as well as reform programs in the UK. He received multiple honours during his time in the civil service, a CB in the 1977 Birthday Honours, CVO in the 1979 Birthday Honours, and KCB in the 1980 Birthday Honours and a GCB in the 1986 New Year Honours.

He spent his later years with his partner, Judith Mary Phillips, and died at his home in Lingen, Herefordshire on 29 August 2015, aged 88.

Government offices
Preceded by Robert Armstrong	Principal Private Secretary to the Prime Minister; 1975–1979	Succeeded by Clive Whitmore
