= Andrew Turnbull, Baron Turnbull =

Life peer from Enfield Town, England

The Right Honourable The Lord Turnbull KCB CVO
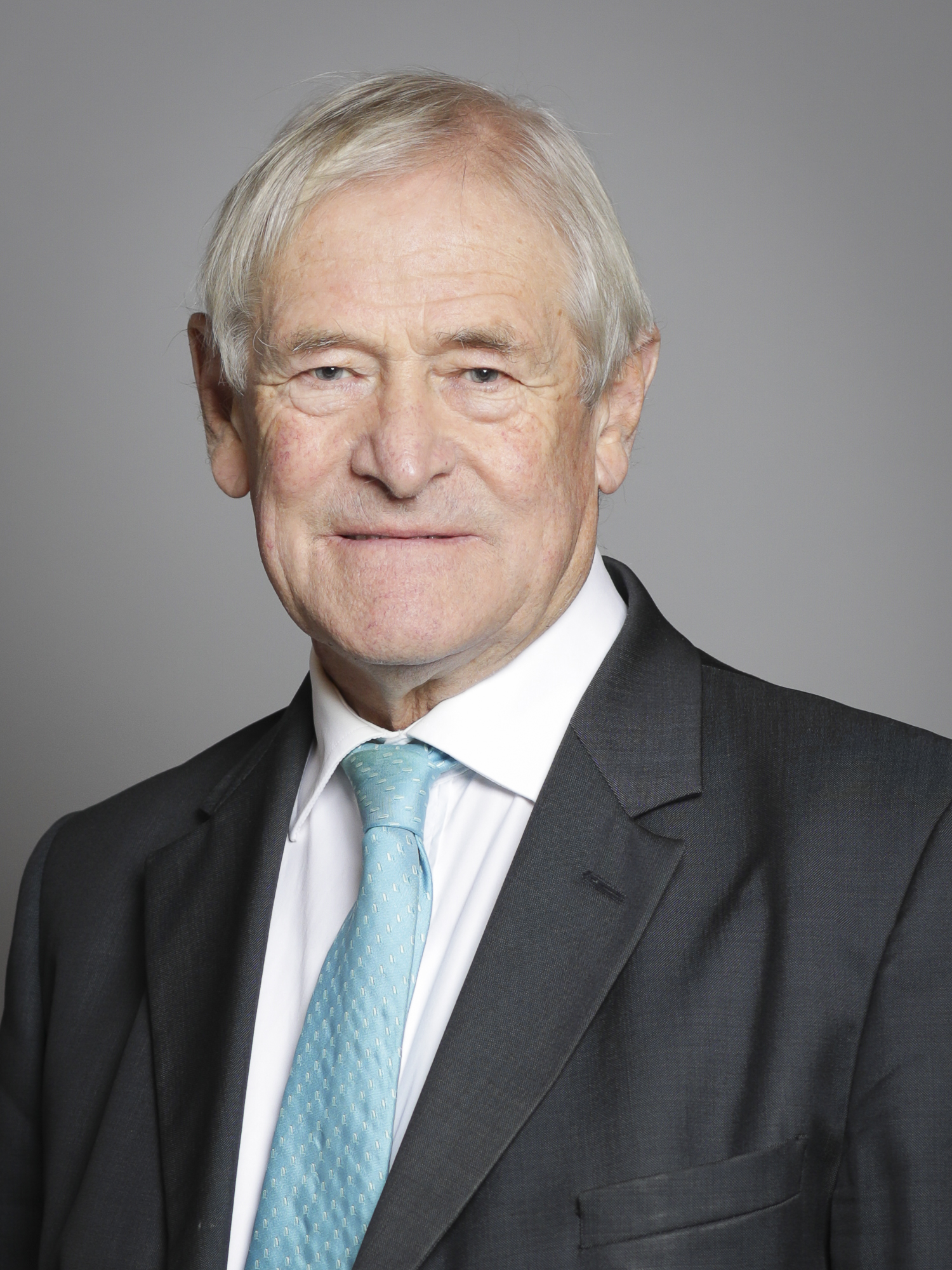
- Official portrait, 2019

Cabinet Secretary Head of the Home Civil Service
- In office 2 September 2002 – 31 July 2005
- Prime Minister: Tony Blair
- Preceded by: Sir Richard Wilson
- Succeeded by: Sir Gus O'Donnell

Permanent Secretary to the Treasury
- In office 1998–2002
- Chancellor: Gordon Brown
- Preceded by: Terence Burns
- Succeeded by: Sir Gus O'Donnell

Principal Private Secretary to the Prime Minister
- In office 1988–1992
- Prime Minister: Margaret Thatcher; John Major
- Preceded by: Nigel Wicks
- Succeeded by: Alex Allan

Member of the House of Lords
- Lord Temporal
- Life peerage 11 October 2005

Personal details
- Born: 21 January 1945 (age 81)
- Spouse: Diane Turnbull (m. 1967)
- Children: 2
- Education: Enfield Grammar School
- Alma mater: Christ's College, Cambridge

Andrew Turnbull, Baron Turnbull, KCB CVO (born 21 January 1945) is a British politician and civil servant who served as the head of Her Majesty's Civil Service and Cabinet Secretary between 2002 and 2005, when he was succeeded by Sir Gus O'Donnell. He now sits in the House of Lords as a crossbencher.

== Education ==
Turnbull was educated at Enfield Grammar School and Christ's College, Cambridge, where he studied economics.

== Career ==
Turnbull was appointed an Overseas Development Institute Fellow in 1968 and was posted to work as an economist in the Ministry of Commerce, Industry and Foreign Trade in Lusaka, Zambia. Turnbull served as Principal Private Secretary to the Prime Minister under Margaret Thatcher and John Major (1988–1992). He served as Defra permanent secretary then Permanent Secretary to the Treasury (1998–2002), the latter traditionally the second-highest-ranking Civil Service post, before succeeding to the highest-ranking post.

The two most senior civil service roles at the top of government have in recent decades been filled by the same individual. As head of the civil service, Lord Turnbull was akin to the chief executive of the organisation, though the lines of reporting are somewhat more complex than is typical in the private sector since Permanent Secretaries (senior civil servants within each department of government) report to ministers. As Cabinet Secretary, a post created in 1916, Turnbull was responsible for the organisation of the Cabinet Office, providing support to the Prime Minister and to the government as a whole. When Turnbull succeeded to the dual role on 2 September 2002, Prime Minister Tony Blair asked him to focus on the management of the civil service, and to make its reorganisation his priority.

Turnbull was appointed a Companion of the Order of the Bath (CB) in 1990, a Commander of the Royal Victorian Order (CVO) in the 1992 Birthday Honours and promoted to Knight Commander of the Order of the Bath (KCB) in the 1998 Birthday Honours.

He was created a life peer as Baron Turnbull, of Enfield in the London Borough of Enfield, on 11 October 2005.

He has taken on directorships, and in 2007 was listed as Senior Executive Advisor with Booz Allen Hamilton. He is a patron of international development charity Zambia Orphans Aid UK, of which he was formerly the chairman.

== Controversy ==
=== Iraq war ===
Turnbull became involved in controversy when on 28 February 2004 he wrote a formal letter admonishing ex-minister Clare Short for making media statements alleging that British intelligence had intercepted communications from (among others) Secretary General of the United Nations Kofi Annan. Short made the confidential letter public, and in turn rebuked Turnbull for allegedly allowing the government decision-making machinery to crumble in the run-up to the 2003 Iraq war. Short suggested that the government's legal expert, Attorney General Lord Goldsmith, had been "leant on" to provide advice that war would be legal. She argued that Turnbull had been responsible for what she alleged was inadequate Cabinet scrutiny of the legal advice, of the basis for the decision to go to war and the alternatives:

"He allowed us to rush to war in Iraq without defence and overseas policy meeting, looking at all the military options and the diplomatic options and political options. (He) allowed the Joint Intelligence Committee to meet with Alastair Campbell chairing it."

In March 2005, Lord Turnbull revealed that Lord Goldsmith's opinion on the legality of the Iraq War was only one page long.

Turnbull gave evidence to the Iraq Inquiry on 13 January 2010.

=== Opinion of Gordon Brown ===
On 20 March 2007, the day before the 2007 budget was announced, he gave an interview with the Financial Times in which he described Gordon Brown as acting with "Stalinist ruthlessness", contrary to the convention that former civil servants do not talk to the media about serving government ministers.

=== Environmental views ===
He is a trustee of the Global Warming Policy Foundation. In 2011, the Foundation issued a report under Turnbull's name, which stated that global temperatures were "on a plateau". The report also called for more scepticism about global warming.

== Personal life ==
Lord Turnbull has been married to his wife Diane since 1967 and has two sons. He lists his hobbies as golf, opera and sailing. He has also served on the Dulwich College Board of Governors, and was its chairman from 2009 to 2015.

Government offices
Preceded by Nigel Wicks	Principal Private Secretary to the Prime Minister; 1988–1992	Succeeded by Alex Allan
Preceded by Sir Terence Burns	Permanent Secretary to the Treasury; 1998–2002	Succeeded by Sir Gus O'Donnell
Preceded by Sir Richard Wilson	Cabinet Secretary & Head of the Home Civil Service; 2002–2005	Succeeded by Sir Gus O'Donnell
Orders of precedence in the United Kingdom
Preceded by The Lord Turner of Ecchinswell	Gentlemen; Baron Turnbull	Followed by The Lord Hastings of Scarisbrick
