= Financial services in Jersey =

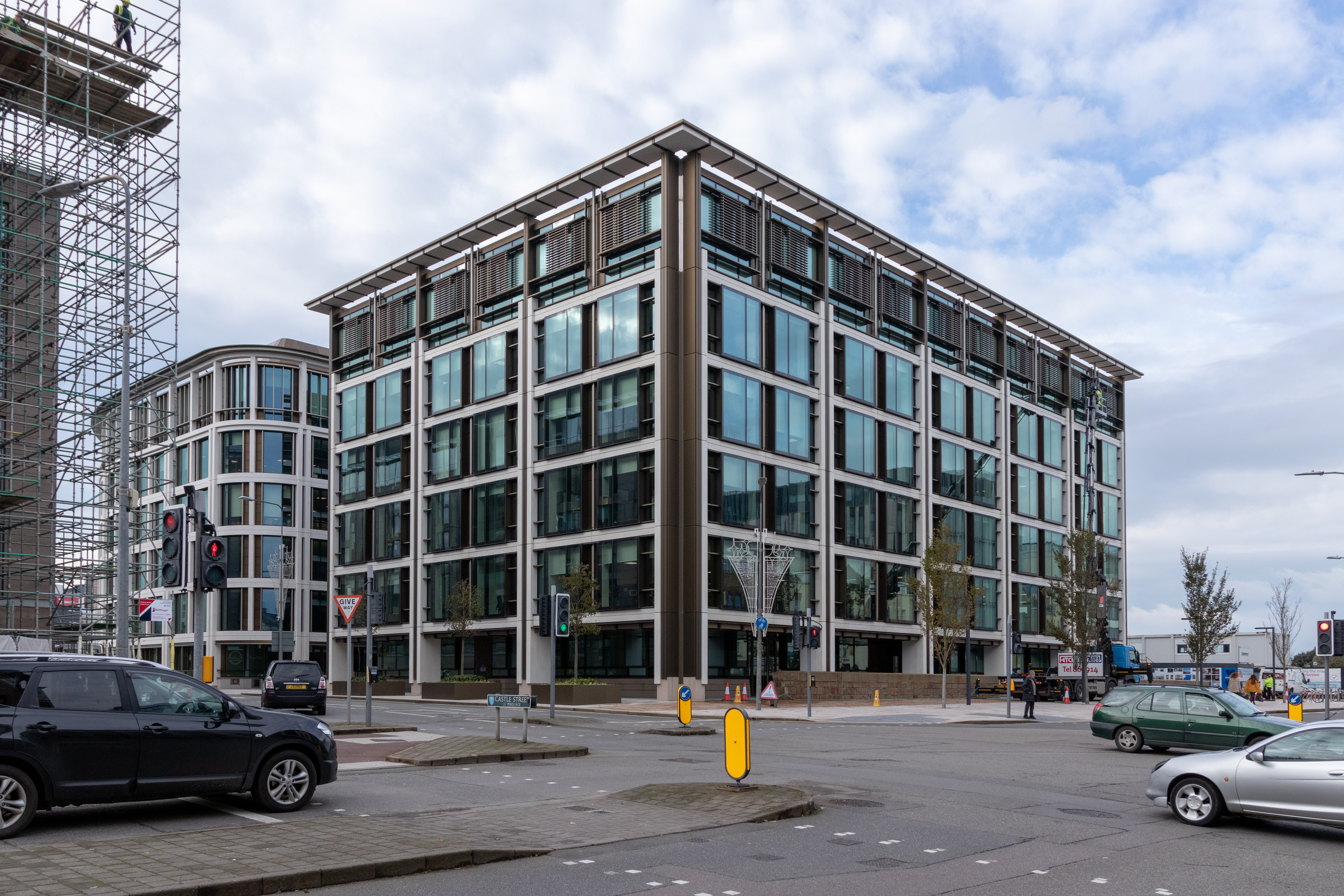
The International Finance Centre

Financial services in Jersey are a highly important part of the economy of the British island of Jersey.

Jersey is considered to be an offshore financial centre (OFC) and one of the most economically successful OFCs in the world. Jersey has the preconditions to be a microstate, but it is a self-governing Crown dependency of the UK. It is sometimes considered to be a tax haven. As of 2021, Jersey has received an AA-credit rating from Standard and Poors.

== History ==
The first ever bank in Jersey was established in 1796. In 1961, banks began to establish offshore operations in Jersey to meet the growing demands of British customers. In the 1970s, Jersey authorities decided that bank licences should be limited to the top 500 global banks. The island was the first jurisdiction in the world to bring trust and company service providers within a regulatory regime.

== Financial and legal services ==
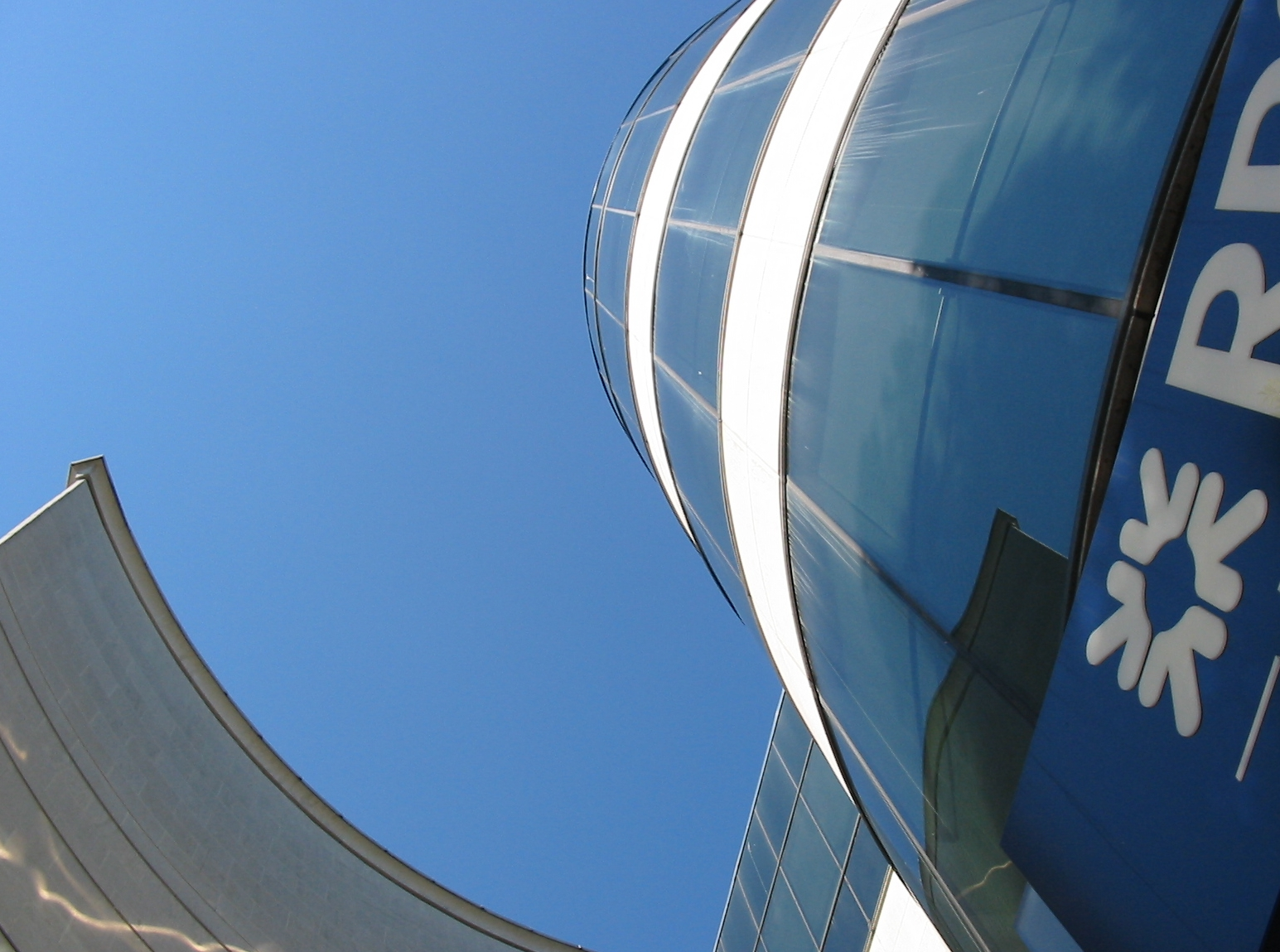
Royal Bank of Scotland building

Jersey-based financial organisations provide services to customers worldwide, including multi-currency banking, offshore mortgages and investment solutions. It is home to banking organisations from across the globe. In June 2020, it was reported that there were 13,450 jobs within this sector. According to Jersey Finance, a group which represents financial sector companies from the island, Jersey represents an extension of the City of London.

The Royal Bank of Canada (RBC) is a major employer with some 900 staff employed in Jersey, as of March 2009. The finance sector profits were about £1.18 billion in 2015. In the second quarter of 2020, the total value of banking deposits held in Jersey decreased from £145.7bn to £141.2bn. There were 33,186 live companies on Jersey's register.

On 4 February 2009 Jersey Finance officially announced its intention to open a new representative office in London. Jersey shares The International Stock Exchange (TISE) with Guernsey, where it is based. It was established in 1998. In 2015, Jersey (in conjunction with the Bailiwick of Guernsey) established the Channel Islands Financial Ombudsman (CIFO) to resolve consumer complaints about financial services provided in or from the Channel Islands.

The first regulated Bitcoin fund was established in Jersey in July 2014, with the approval of the Jersey Financial Services Commission, after island leaders expressed a desire for Jersey to become a global center for digital currencies. At the time of the establishment of the fund by a Jersey-based hedge fund company, Bitcoin was already being accepted by some local businesses.

== 'Tax haven' status ==
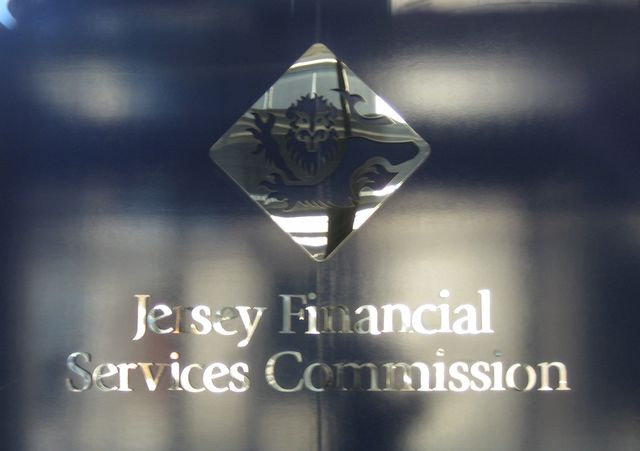
Logo of the financial regulator Jersey Financial Services Commission

Jersey is one of the top worldwide offshore financial centers. It is described by some as a tax haven. It attracts deposits from customers outside of the island, seeking the advantages such places offer, like reduced tax burdens.

Jersey has been variously given the title of a 'tax haven' since the 1920s, when wealthy Brits began to move (or move their wealth) into the island to avoid wealth and inheritance taxes. Its taxation laws have been widely criticised by various people and groups.

== See also ==
- Jersey Finance
- Jersey Financial Services Commission
- Channel Islands Financial Ombudsman
