= Anne Mueller =

British civil servant (1930–2000)

Dame Anne Mueller DCB

Chancellor of De Montfort University
- In office June 1991 – 1995
- Vice-Chancellor: Kenneth Barker
- Preceded by: Office created
- Succeeded by: Sir Clive Whitmore

Personal details
- Born: 15 October 1930 Bombay
- Died: 8 July 2000 (aged 69) London, England
- Education: St Helen and St Katharine; Wakefield Girls' High School
- Alma mater: Somerville College, Oxford

Dame Anne Elisabeth Mueller, DCB (15 October 1930 – 8 July 2000) was a British civil servant and academic. She was Second Permanent Secretary at the Cabinet Office from 1984 to 1987 and then at HM Treasury from 1987 to 1990. She was Chancellor of De Montfort University from June 1991 until 1995.

She was the first woman to become a Permanent Secretary at HM Treasury; the second was Sharon White in 2013. An obituary in The Guardian described her as "the most successful woman civil servant of her generation".

== Early and private life ==
She was born in Bombay. Her father Herbert Constantin Mueller (1891-1952) was a German businessman and her mother Phoebe Ann (née Beevers) (1901-1973) was an English teacher. Her parents met and married in India. They lived in Slovenia in the late 1930s, where they ran a vineyard.

She moved to England before the war broke out, and studied at St Helen and St Katharine School, in Abingdon, and then Wakefield Girls' High School. Her mother and then her father escaped to England; her mother was interned before joining the ATS. After the war, her parents moved to a farm in Rhodesia with her brother, while she remained at school in England.

She won a scholarship to Somerville College, Oxford, in 1949, where she read philosophy, politics and economics.

She married fellow civil servant James Hugh Robertson in 1958. They were divorced in 1978.

== Career ==
She joined the civil service in 1953, working as an assistant principal at the Ministry of Labour and National Service. She suffered serious injuries in a car accident in 1956, while on secondment to the Organisation for European Economic Co-operation in France. She returned to work after two years of rehabilitation, but her injuries later gave her early arthritis.

She worked with Lawrence Helsby at the Ministry of Labour from 1958, and moved with him to HM Treasury in 1963.

She became an undersecretary at the Department of Trade and Industry in 1972, and then a deputy secretary in 1977. She moved to the Cabinet Office in 1984, where she became Second Permanent Secretary, responsible for reforming the pay and management of the civil service, and continued that role as Second Permanent Secretary at HM Treasury from 1987 to 1990. She was diagnosed with Parkinson's disease in the late 1980s.

She became a governor at De Montfort University (Leicester) in 1988. After she retired from the civil service, she was Chancellor of De Montfort University from 1991 until 1995. She also worked for CARE International from 1992, and was a director of BSkyB.

She was also associated with the Institute of Management Studies, Manchester Business School, Templeton College, Oxford, and Queen Mary and Westfield College, London.

She became a Companion of the Order of the Bath (CB) in the 1980 Birthday Honours and advanced to DCB in the 1988 Birthday Honours, the second woman to become a Dame Commander of the Order of the Bath.

She died at Chelsea and Westminster Hospital. A memorial service was held at Westminster Abbey on 3 October 2000.

Government offices
Preceded by Peter le Cheminant	Second Permanent Secretary at the Cabinet Office (Management and Personnel Office); 1984–1987	Succeeded by Sir Peter Kemp as Second Permanent Secretary of the Office of the Minister for the Civil Service
