= Richard Wilson, Baron Wilson of Dinton =

British civil servant and crossbench peer (born 1942)

The Right Honourable The Lord Wilson of Dinton GCB
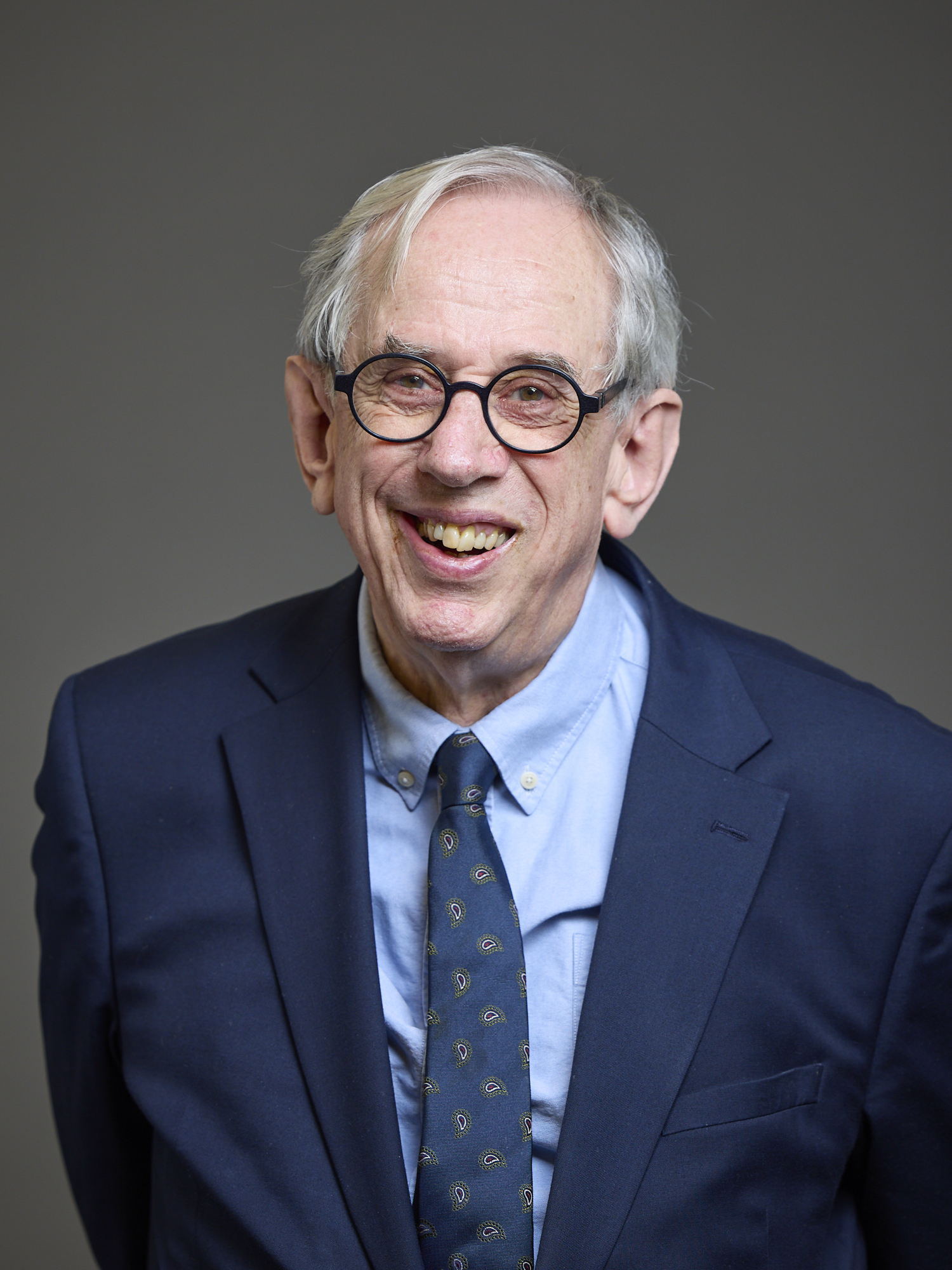
- Official portrait, 2026

Cabinet Secretary Head of the Home Civil Service
- In office 1998–2002
- Prime Minister: Tony Blair
- Preceded by: Robin Butler
- Succeeded by: Andrew Turnbull

Permanent Under-Secretary of State for the Home Department
- In office 1994–1997
- Home Secretary: Michael Howard; Jack Straw
- Preceded by: Sir Clive Whitmore
- Succeeded by: Sir David Omand

Member of the House of Lords
- Lord Temporal
- Life peerage 18 November 2002 – 6 September 2026

Personal details
- Born: 11 October 1942 (age 84) Glamorgan, Wales
- Education: Radley College
- Alma mater: Clare College, Cambridge

Richard Thomas James Wilson, Baron Wilson of Dinton, (born 11 October 1942) is a member of the British House of Lords and former Cabinet Secretary.

== Career ==
Richard Wilson was born in Glamorgan. He was educated at Radley College (1956–60 and where he much later chaired the College Council (the governing body)) and Clare College, Cambridge (1961–65), where he was awarded the degree of Master of Laws (LLM). He was called to the Bar but, rather than practise, entered the Civil Service as an assistant principal in the Board of Trade in 1966.

He subsequently served in a number of departments including 12 years in the Department of Energy where his responsibilities included nuclear power policy, the privatisation of Britoil, personnel and finance. He headed the Economic Secretariat in the Cabinet Office under Margaret Thatcher from 1987 to 1990 and after two years in the Treasury was appointed Permanent Secretary of the Department of the Environment in 1992.

He became Permanent Under-Secretary of State at the Home Office in 1994 and Secretary of the Cabinet and Head of the Home Civil Service in January 1998, retiring in 2002.

Wilson was appointed a Companion of the Order of the Bath (CB) in the 1991 New Year Honours, promoted to Knight Commander (KCB) in the 1997 New Year Honours and to Knight Grand Cross (GCB) in the 2001 New Year Honours.

After retiring as Cabinet Secretary, he was created a life peer on 18 November 2002 with the title Baron Wilson of Dinton, of Dinton in the County of Buckinghamshire. In September of that year, he was made Master of Emmanuel College, Cambridge.

He has variously been a Non-executive Director of British Sky Broadcasting Group plc, Chairman of C. Hoare & Co, a Non-executive Director of Xansa and Chair of the Board of Patrons of The Wilberforce Society.

He retired from the Lords on 6 September 2026.

Government offices
Preceded by Sir Terry Heiser	Permanent Secretary at the Department of the Environment; 1992–1994	Succeeded by Sir Andrew Turnbull (later, The Lord Turnbull)
Preceded by Sir Clive Whitmore	Permanent Under-Secretary of State for the Home Department; 1994–1997	Succeeded by Sir David Omand
Preceded by Sir Robin Butler	Cabinet Secretary & Head of the Home Civil Service; 1998–2002	Succeeded by Sir Andrew Turnbull
Academic offices
Preceded by John Ffowcs Williams	Master of Emmanuel College, Cambridge; 2002–2012	Succeeded by Fiona Reynolds
Orders of precedence in the United Kingdom
Preceded by The Lord Black of Crossharbour	Gentlemen; Baron Wilson of Dinton	Followed by The Lord Cullen of Whitekirk
