= Permanent Under-Secretary of State at the Home Office =

UK senior civil servant position

- Royal Arms as used by the Home Office
- Incumbent; Gareth Davies since 6 April 2026
- Home Office
- Reports to: Home Secretary
- Term length: At His Majesty's pleasure
- First holder: J. Bell
- Website: www.gov.uk

The permanent under-secretary of state at the Home Office is the permanent secretary at the Home Office, the most senior civil servant in the department, charged with running its affairs on a day-to-day basis.

== List of permanent secretaries ==
- March 1782: J. Bell
- December 1791: John King
- February 1806 – 1817: John Beckett [later Sir John Beckett, Bart.]
- June 1817 – 1827: Henry Hobhouse
- July 1827 – 1848: Samuel March Phillipps
- 1848–1867: Horatio Waddington
- 1867–1885: Sir Adolphus Frederick Octavius Liddell
- June 1885: Sir H. Maine
- July 1885 – 1895: Sir Godfrey Lushington
- 1895–1903: Sir Kenelm Digby
- 1903–1908: Sir Mackenzie Dalzell Chalmers
- 1908–1922: Sir Edward Troup
- 1922–1932: Sir John Anderson
- 1932–1938: Sir Russell Scott
- 1938–1948: Sir Alexander Maxwell
- 1948–1957: Sir Frank Newsam
- 1957–1966: Sir Charles Cunningham
- 1966–1972: Sir Philip Allen
- 1972–1977: Sir Arthur Peterson
- 1977–1979: Sir Robert Armstrong
- 1979–1988: Sir Brian Cubbon
- 1988–1994: Sir Clive Whitmore
- 1994–1997: Sir Richard Wilson
- 1997–2001: Sir David Omand
- 2001–2005: Sir John Gieve
- 2005–2011: Sir David Normington
- 2011–2012: Dame Helen Ghosh
- 2012–2013: Helen Kilpatrick (acting)
- 2013–2017: Mark Sedwill
- 2017–2020: Sir Philip Rutnam
- 2020–2025: Sir Matthew Rycroft
- 28 March 2025 – 14 April 2025: Simon Ridley (acting)
- 14 April 2025 – 19 February 2026: Dame Antonia Romeo
- 19 February 2026 – 5 April 2026: Simon Ridley (acting)
- From 6 April 2026 – Gareth Davies

== See also ==
- Permanent Under-Secretary of State for Foreign Affairs
- Under-Secretary of State for the Home Department
- Undersecretary
