= Channel Islands Financial Ombudsman =

Statutory ombudsman scheme in the Channel Islands

Agency overview
- Formed: 2015; 11 years ago
- Type: Statutory ombudsman scheme
- Jurisdiction: Jersey and Bailiwick of Guernsey
- Headquarters: St Helier, Jersey; 49°10′57″N 2°06′11″W
- Employees: 19 (2024)
- Annual budget: £1,556,113
- Agency executive: Douglas Melville, Principal ombudsman and Chief Executive
- Key document: Financial Services Ombudsman (Jersey) Law 2014, Financial Services Ombudsman (Bailiwick of Guernsey) Law 2014

The Channel Islands Financial Ombudsman (CIFO) is a statutory ombudsman scheme with jurisdiction in both Jersey and the Bailiwick of Guernsey. The service investigates complaints regarding financial services provided in or from the Channel Islands. The organisation received its full statutory powers in 2015. CIFO is one of a handful of pan-island institutions, other examples being the Office of the Director of Civil Aviation and the Channel Islands Brussels Office. The organisation is led by a principal ombudsman and chief executive, a post currently held by Douglas Melville. Melville had previously served as the chief executive of the Ombudsman for Banking Services and Investments in Canada. If accepted by the complainant, CIFO decisions are legally binding on both parties and there is no possibility of appeal. However, ombudsman decisions may be subject to judicial review in the Royal Court of either jurisdiction. In Jersey, CIFO reports to the Minister for Sustainable Economic Development. In Guernsey, CIFO reports to the President of the Committee for Economic Development of the States of Guernsey.

The organisation is headquartered in Jersey.

== Complaints ==
Complainants do not need to live in or be based in the Channel Islands to be eligible to make a complaint. Complainants are required to give the financial services provider a reasonable opportunity to investigate and respond before bringing a complaint to CIFO. However, under their statutory remit, CIFO can use discretion to waive this requirement under exceptional circumstances.

== Reports ==
In a report published in November 2025, CIFO found that fraud was the most frequent complaint among those brought to CIFO, representing 28 of the 115 complaints submitted in the last quarter. Most complaints related to issues with current accounts, followed by health insurance and home emergency insurance. In the most recent quarter, the service had either mediated or determined 110 complaints, of which 60 had been found in favour of the complainant.

CIFO publishes anonymised reports about complaints and their resolution as case studies.

In 2024, the service awarded compensation to complainants in excess of £800,000, with the average amount awarded being approximately £5,000.

== Controversies ==
In October 2025, CIFO was subject to a formal reprimand issued by the Jersey Office of the Data Commissioner. This followed a complaint by an individual who had submitted a Subject Access Request in 2024 and received a response from CIFO that "lacked clarity" and "raised questions regarding transparency and accuracy". The reprimand led CIFO to appoint a new data protection officer, to train all staff and to put enhanced policies in place. This is the second data protection reprimand issued against CIFO, following a 2020 reprimand by the Guernsey Office of the Data Protection Authority in which the data protection authority admonished CIFO for sending an email containing personal data, including special category data, to the wrong email address.

== See also ==
- Financial services in Jersey
