= Philip Allen, Baron Allen of Abbeydale =

The Right Honourable The Lord Allen of Abbeydale

Member of the House of Lords
- Lord Temporal
- Life peerage 12 July 1976 – 27 November 2007

Personal details
- Born: 8 July 1912
- Died: 27 November 2007 (aged 95)

Philip Allen, Baron Allen of Abbeydale, GCB (8 July 1912, Sheffield – 27 November 2007, Windsor, Berkshire) was a British civil servant.

== Education and early life ==
He was the son of Arthur Allen and Louie Tipper and educated at King Edward VII School in Sheffield and Queens' College, Cambridge, where he read law. He came top of his year in the Civil Service administrative examinations in 1934.

== Career ==
Allen joined the Home Office in 1934 and served in the War Cabinet (1943–44), then as Deputy Secretary to the Ministry of Housing and Local Government (1955–60). He then became Deputy Under-Secretary of State at the Home Office (1960–62), Second Secretary at HM Treasury (1963–66), and Permanent Under-Secretary of State at the Home Office (1966–72).

== Timothy Evans ==
As deputy chairman of the Prison Commission for England and Wales from 1950 to 1952, he advised against a reprieve for Timothy Evans, hanged in 1950 for the murder of his baby daughter at 10 Rillington Place, London. He also thought that Evans was guilty of the murder of his wife, for which Evans had not been prosecuted. Evans was pardoned in 1966 and Evans' neighbour, John Christie, was held responsible for strangling his own wife and five other women as well as Evans' wife, to which he confessed. When the Home Office files were published, Allen expressed his deep regret at the advice he had given.

== Derek Bentley ==
Together with Permanent Under-Secretary Sir Frank Newsam, Allen unsuccessfully urged a reprieve for Derek Bentley, who was hanged aged 19 in 1953 for the murder of a policeman. Bentley, who was already under arrest at the time, had allegedly called to an armed accomplice, Christopher Craig, "Let him have it, Chris!", when they were caught in a burglary. The remark, if made, was ambiguous, possibly urging surrender of Craig's gun, rather than inciting Craig to murder. In 1998, Bentley received a posthumous pardon. Craig was imprisoned, being under-age for execution, and was later released.

== Honours and roles ==
Allen was appointed a Companion of the Order of the Bath (CB) in the 1954 Birthday Honours, promoted to Knight Commander (KCB) in the 1964 Birthday Honours and to Knight Grand Cross (GCB) in the 1970 Birthday Honours.

In 1975, under the provisions of the Referendum Act, he oversaw as "Chief Counting Officer" for the European Communities membership referendum on 5 June, the first referendum ever to be held across the United Kingdom and saw voters approve continued membership by 67% of voters to 32% on a national turnout of 64%.

Announced in the 1976 Birthday Honours, Allen was created a life peer as Baron Allen of Abbeydale, of the City of Sheffield, on 12 July 1976. He sat in the House of Lords as a crossbencher. From 1973 to 1978 he was a member of the Pearson commission.

He was chairman of the council of Royal Holloway College during its merger with Bedford College in 1985.

Coat of arms of Philip Allen, Baron Allen of Abbeydale
Crest Within a wreath of holly Proper a boar's head erased behind the ears Argent holding in the jaws a dice Gold. Escutcheon Barry of twelve Azure and Argent two swords in saltire points in base Proper hilts pommels and quillons Or surmounted by a representation of the tower of Beauchief Abbey Proper. Supporters On either side a tricolour cavalier King Charles spaniel the compartment comprising a grassy mount growing therefrom sprigs of holly all Proper. Motto Ad Recta Tende

== Personal life ==
In 1938, he married Marjorie Coe (d. 2002). They had no children. He lived for many years in Englefield Green, Surrey.

Government offices
Preceded by Sir Charles Cunningham	Permanent Under-Secretary of State for the Home Department; 1966 to 1972	Succeeded by Sir Arthur Peterson
