= Montague Levine =

British surgeon (1922–2013)

Sir Montague Bernard Levine FRCGP (15 May 1922 – 14 February 2013) was a British doctor and coroner. He was personal physician to James Callaghan.

He was born in Manchester, the son of immigrants from Eastern Europe. During World War II, he worked as an industrial chemist specialising in rubber products. In 1945, following his discharge, he bought a company that made balloons and condoms. He sold the firm in 1948 to the British Oxygen Company and then trained as a doctor.

He was later the coroner for Inner South London, covering several major hospitals, Brixton prison and Belmarsh high security jail. He presided over about 500 inquests a year.

He received his knighthood in Callaghan's resignation honours.
