= 1979 Dissolution Honours =

British government recognitions

The 1979 Dissolution Honours List was issued in June 1979 following the general election of that year.

The recipients of honours are displayed as they were styled before their new honour.

== Life Peers (all Labour) ==
=== Baroness ===
- Lena May Jeger, lately Member of Parliament for Camden, Holborn and St. Pancras South.

=== Baron ===
- John Edward Brooks, Chairman of the Labour Party, Wales; former Leader of the Labour Group, County of South Glamorgan
- Sir Myer Galpern, lately Member of Parliament for Glasgow Shettleston; lately First Deputy Chairman of Ways and Means, House of Commons.
- Rt Hon. Cledwyn Hughes, CH, lately Member of Parliament for Anglesey. Secretary of State for Wales 1966–1968; Minister of Agriculture, Fisheries and Food 1968–1970.
- Rt Hon. Sydney Irving, lately Member of Parliament for Dartford. Chairman of Ways and Means, House of Commons 1968-70
- Rt Hon. Norman Harold Lever, MP, Member of Parliament for Manchester Central; lately Chancellor of the Duchy of Lancaster
- Rt Hon. William Ross, MBE, lately Member of Parliament for Kilmarnock. Formerly Secretary of State for Scotland.
- Rt Hon. Robert Maitland Michael Stewart, CH, lately Member of Parliament for Fulham. Formerly Secretary of State for Foreign and Commonwealth Affairs.
- Rt Hon. George Russell Strauss, lately Member of Parliament for Vauxhall. Minister of Supply 1947-51
- Henry Reginall Underhill, CBE, National Agent of the Labour Party

== Privy Councillor ==
The Queen appointed the following to Her Majesty's Most Honourable Privy Council:

- Ernest Armstrong MP, Member of Parliament for the North West Durham. Lately Parliamentary Under-Secretary of State, Department of the Environment
- Jack Ashley CH MP, Member of Parliament for the Stoke-on-Trent South
- Trevor Alec Jones MP, Member of Parliament for Rhondda. Lately Parliamentary Under-Secretary of State, Welsh Office
- Gordon James Oakes MP, Member of Parliament for Widnes. Lately Minister of State, Department of Education and Science
- Harold Walker MP, Member of Parliament for Doncaster. Lately Minister of State, Department of Employment

== Knight Bachelor ==
- Frank Herbert Barlow CBE, Secretary, Parliamentary Labour Party
- John McFarlane Boyd CBE, General Secretary, Amalgamated Union of Engineering Workers
- Montague Bernard Levine, Personal Physician to the Rt Hon. James Callaghan
- Thomas Daniel McCaffrey, Formerly Chief Press Secretary, 10 Downing Street
- Joseph Percival William Mallalieu, lately Member of Parliament for the East Division of Huddersfield East. Minister of Defence (Royal Navy) 1966–1967. Minister of State, Board of Trade, 1967–1968. Minister of Technology 1968–1969.
- Thomas Gwilym Morris CBE QPM, Chief Constable, South Wales Constabulary
- Raphael Herman Tuck, lately Member of Parliament for Watford

== Members of the Order of the Companions of Honour (CH) ==
- Rt Hon. Denis Winston Healey MBE MP, Member of Parliament for the Leeds East. Lately Chancellor of the Exchequer.

== The Most Excellent Order of the British Empire ==
=== Dame Commander of the Order of the British Empire (DBE) ===
- Rt Hon. Judith Constance Mary Hart MP, Member of Parliament for Lanark. Lately Minister for Overseas Development.

=== Commander of the Order of the British Empire (CBE) ===
- Donald Richard Coleman MP, Member of Parliament for Neath. Lately Vice-Chamberlain of the Household.
- Gordon Kenneth Dennis, Farmer, Lewes, Sussex
- Derek Oliver Gladwin OBE, Regional Secretary, Southern Region, General and Municipal Workers Union
- James Hamilton MP, Member of Parliament for the Bothwell Division of Lanarkshire. Lately Comptroller of the Household
- John Emrys Jones, Secretary/Organiser, Labour Party, Wales
- Ruth Margaret Sharpe MBE, Private and Constituency Secretary to the Rt Hon. James Callaghan
- Roger Stott MP, Member of Parliament for the Westhoughton. Lately Parliamentary Private Secretary
- Derek Adrian Webster, Chairman, Scottish Daily Record and Sunday Mail Ltd.
- Nigel Leonard Wicks, Formerly Private Secretary, Prime Minister's Office, 10 Downing Street

=== Officer of the Order of the British Empire (OBE) ===
- Gavyn Davies, Policy Adviser to the Rt Hon. James Callaghan
- David John Wise, National Secretary, Co-operative Party
- Philip Wood, Formerly Private Secretary, Prime Minister's Office, 10 Downing Street

=== Member of the Order of the British Empire (MBE) ===
- Margaret Dougan, Private Secretary to Members of Parliament
- David Evans, Chairman, Cardiff South East Labour Party
- John David Fletcher Holt, Formerly Private Secretary, Prime Minister's Office, 10 Downing Street
- Albert Henry Long, Chief Clerk Superintendent, Whips Office, House of Commons
- Peter Ronald McClellan Taylor BEM, Office Manager, Prime Minister's Office, 10 Downing Street
- Eva Florence Thomas, Secretary, Ely Labour Party, Cardiff
- Annabel Urquhart, Assistant Scottish Organiser, Labour Party, Scotland
- John Bretnall Warwicker, Superintendent, Metropolitan Police

=== British Empire Medal (BEM) ===
Civil Division

- Charles Edward Barton, Messenger, Prime Minister's Office, 10 Downing Street
- Pamela Broughton, Telephonist, Prime Minister's Office, 10 Downing Street
- Joseph Robert Hazard, Driver to the Rt Hon. James Callaghan
- Colin Brian Holden, the Chef at Chequers
- Daisy Elizabeth Riley, Cleaner, Prime Minister's Office, 10 Downing Street
- Wren Dorothy Woodcock, Stewardess at Chequers
