= Clive Whitmore =

British senior civil servant (born 1935)

Sir Clive Whitmore GCB CVO

Principal Private Secretary to the Prime Minister
- In office 1979–1982
- Monarch: Elizabeth II
- Prime Minister: Margaret Thatcher
- Preceded by: Kenneth Stowe
- Succeeded by: Robin Butler

Chancellor of De Montfort University
- In office 1995–1998
- Vice-Chancellor: Kenneth Barker
- Preceded by: Dame Anne Mueller
- Succeeded by: John White

Personal details
- Born: Clive Anthony Whitmore; 18 January 1935 (age 91) Brentford, Middlesex

Sir Clive Anthony Whitmore GCB CVO (born 18 January 1935) is a former British senior civil servant.

Whitmore was educated at Sutton Grammar School in Surrey and Christ's College, Cambridge.

Whitmore served as Principal Private Secretary to Margaret Thatcher from 1979 to 1982. After that, he was appointed as Permanent Secretary of the Ministry of Defence and served until 1988. From 1988 to 1994, he was Permanent Under-Secretary of State at the Home Office.

Whitmore was appointed Commander of the Royal Victorian Order (CVO) in the 1983 New Year Honours and Knight Commander of the Order of the Bath (KCB) in the 1983 Birthday Honours. He was promoted to Knight Grand Cross of the Order of the Bath (GCB) in the 1988 Birthday Honours.

Government offices
Preceded by Kenneth Stowe	Principal Private Secretary to the Prime Minister; 1979–1982	Succeeded by Robin Butler
Preceded by Sir Frank Cooper	Permanent Secretary of the Ministry of Defence; 1982–1988	Succeeded by Sir Michael Quinlan
Preceded by Sir Brian Cubbon	Permanent Secretary at the Home Office; 1988–1994	Succeeded by Richard Wilson
