= The Sydney Russell School =

Location
- Parsloes Avenue; Becontree; Dagenham, Greater London, RM9 5QT; England; 51.5483°N 0.1332°E

Information
- Type: Academy
- Established: 1935
- Local authority: Barking and Dagenham
- Department for Education URN: 141683 Tables
- Ofsted: Reports
- Head Teacher: Clare Cross
- Gender: Mixed
- Age: 4 to 18
- Enrolment: 1667
- Former name: Dagenham County High School
- Website: sydneyrussellschool.com

The Sydney Russell School is a coeducational secondary school and sixth form located in Dagenham, London, England.

== Admissions ==
It is near the junction of the A124 and Porters Avenue (A1153). It is around two miles north of the Ford Dagenham plant.

== History ==
=== Grammar school ===
One of the predecessor schools, which was established in 1935, was Dagenham County High School. That school had around five hundred boys and girls. It was built on the Becontree Estate, which had twenty-seven thousand houses. From 1965 it was administered by the London Borough of Barking.

=== Comprehensive ===
In a reorganisation in 1970, the buildings of the predecessor school became the location for a new comprehensive school, Parsloes Manor School. South East Essex County Technical High School moved to a new site in 1962, and merged with Bifrons Secondary Modern School in 1970 to form Mayesbrook School. Mayesbrook merged with Parsloes Manor School to become The Sydney Russell School in 1990.

=== Name change ===
In a reorganisation in 1990, the above-mentioned predecessor school amalgamated with two other local schools. The name of the new school formed was The Sydney Russell School, after Sydney Russell (1906-1988) a local Methodist minister who served as chair of the governors at the former Parsloes Manor Comprehensive School.

=== Academy ===
In February 2015 the school converted to Academy status.

== Academic performance ==
The school gets above average results at GCSE, with the second best EBacc results in Barking & Dagenham.

At A-level the school achieves the highest progress scores in the borough.

== Notable former pupils ==
- Hollie Ridley, General Secretary of the Labour Party from 2024 to 2026

=== Dagenham County High School ===
- Prof Roy Greenslade, Professor of Journalism at City University, Editor from 1990 of the Daily Mirror; he traced 122 former school colleagues in 1976 and wrote a book entitled Goodbye to the Working Class
- Sidney Hinkes, pacifist
- Canon Eric James
- Dudley Moore CBE, pianist, organist and comedian
- Dave Munden (2 December 1943 - 2020), drummer with The Tremeloes
- Paul Speare, saxophonist for Dexys Midnight Runners
- Sir Kenneth Stowe CB CVO
- Airidas Golambeckis, current professional footballer for West Ham United

=== Bifrons Secondary Modern School ===
- George Carey PC, FRSA, former Archbishop of Canterbury
