= Robin Butler, Baron Butler of Brockwell =

British civil servant (born 1938)

The Right Honourable The Lord Butler of Brockwell KG GCB CVO PC
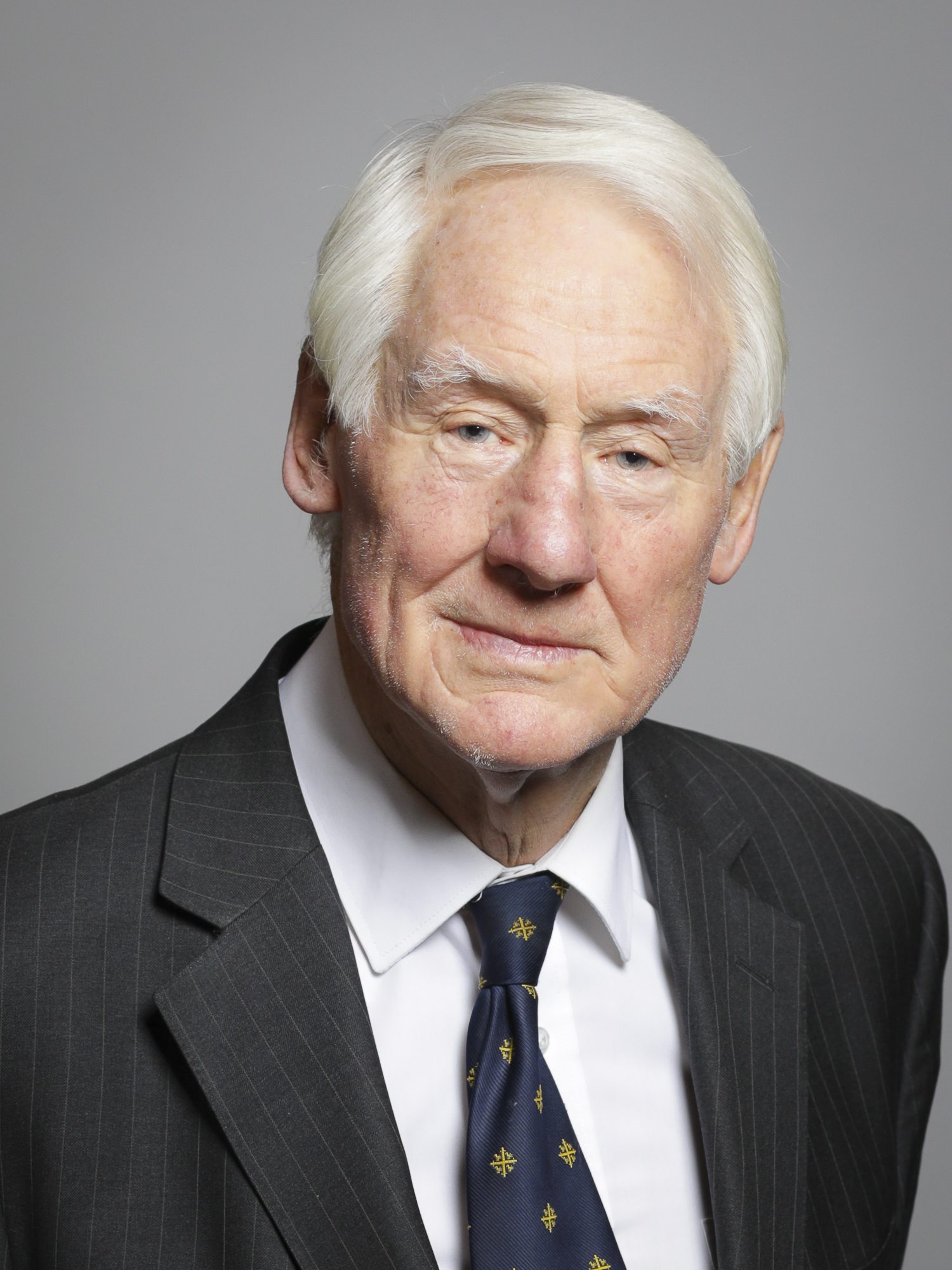
- Official portrait, 2019

Cabinet Secretary Head of the Home Civil Service
- In office 1988–1998
- Prime Minister: Margaret Thatcher; John Major; Tony Blair
- Preceded by: Sir Robert Armstrong
- Succeeded by: Sir Richard Wilson

Principal Private Secretary to the Prime Minister
- In office 1982–1985
- Prime Minister: Margaret Thatcher
- Preceded by: Clive Whitmore
- Succeeded by: Nigel Wicks

Member of the House of Lords
- Lord Temporal
- Life peerage 12 February 1998

Personal details
- Born: 3 January 1938 (age 88) Lytham St Annes, Lancashire, England
- Spouse: Gillian Lois Galley (m. 1962)
- Children: 3
- Education: University College, Oxford

Frederick Edward Robin Butler, Baron Butler of Brockwell (born 3 January 1938) is a retired British civil servant, now sitting in the House of Lords as a crossbencher.

== Early life and family ==
Butler was born in Lytham St Annes, Lancashire, on 3 January 1938. He went to Orley Farm School and Harrow School (where he was Head Boy), then taught for a year at St Dunstan's School, Burnham-on-Sea, before attending University College, Oxford, where he took a double first in Mods and Greats and twice gained a Rugby Blue. He married Gillian Lois Galley in 1962. They have two daughters and a son.

== Civil service career ==
Butler had a high-profile career in the civil service from 1961 to 1998, serving as Private Secretary to five Prime Ministers. He was Secretary of the Cabinet and Head of the Home Civil Service from 1988 to 1998.

Butler joined HM Treasury in 1961, becoming Private Secretary to the Financial Secretary to the Treasury 1964–66 and Secretary to the Budget Committee 1965–69.

Early in his career, he was occasionally confused with his namesake Rab Butler. Memos for Rab Butler, some highly sensitive, ended up on his desk, and some of his ended up on Rab's. It was agreed that all memos ambiguously addressed to "R Butler" should go to Rab's office first, and then Rab's office would send on any intended for the other R Butler. It is said that one day the young Butler, who was still playing first class rugby, received a letter that read: "You have been selected for the Richmond 1st XV on Saturday. Please be at Twickenham by 2 p.m.". Underneath, in Rab's distinctive handwriting, was the message: "Dear Robin, I am not free on Saturday. Please could you deputise for me? Rab"!

In 1969, he was seconded to the Bank of England and several City institutions. Later at HM Treasury as Assistant Secretary, General Expenditure Intelligence Division, he led the team which installed the UK Government's computerised financial information system 1975–77. He had been a founder member of the Central Policy Review Staff under Lord Rothschild 1971–2. After several senior appointments at the Treasury, he became second Permanent Secretary, Public Expenditure, 1985–87.

Butler was Private Secretary to Prime Ministers Edward Heath (1972–74) and Harold Wilson (1974–75), and Principal Private Secretary to Margaret Thatcher (1982–85). Along with Thatcher, he was almost killed in the 1984 IRA bombing of the Grand Hotel in Brighton. He was also Cabinet Secretary during the premierships of Margaret Thatcher, John Major and Tony Blair.

== Other activities ==
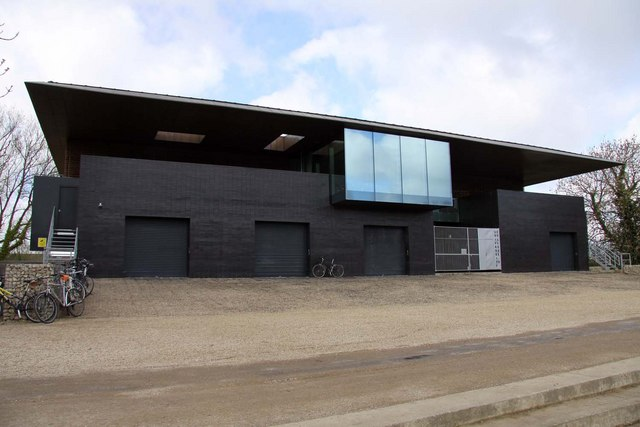
The University College Boathouse, opened in 2007 during Robin Butler's Mastership of University College, Oxford

After retiring from the Civil Service, Butler was Master of University College, Oxford, 1998–2008. He was made a life peer in the 1998 New Year Honours and was raised to the peerage as Baron Butler of Brockwell, of Herne Hill in the London Borough of Lambeth.

He was a non-executive Director of HSBC Group from 1998 to 2008. He was also Chairman of the Corporate Sustainability Committee and the HSBC Global Education Trust. In 2011 he was elected Master of the Worshipful Company of Salters. He is a Trustee of the Royal Academy of Music.

In 2004, Lord Butler of Brockwell chaired the Review of Intelligence on Weapons of Mass Destruction, widely known as the 'Butler Review', which reviewed the use of intelligence in the lead up to the 2003 Iraq War. The report concluded that some of the intelligence about Iraq's possession of weapons of mass destruction was seriously flawed. The report also concluded, with regards to the so-called Niger uranium forgeries, that the report Saddam's government was seeking uranium in Africa appeared 'well-founded'.

Lord Butler of Brockwell in 2025 warned that the UK is moving towards a US-style system, in which new governments replace senior civil servants with political appointees. He said: "It seems to me that, overall, a clear pattern is emerging. We have moved to the American pattern of replacing senior civil servants with political appointees when the party of government changes. As one of my former colleagues said to me, civil servants in the centre of government have become an endangered species."

== Honours and arms ==
=== Honours ===
- Commander of the Royal Victorian Order (CVO), 1986 New Year Honours
- Knight Commander of the Order of the Bath (KCB), 1988 New Year Honours
- Knight Grand Cross of the Order of the Bath (GCB), 1992 Birthday Honours
- Life peerage, 12 February 1998
- Knight Companion of the Order of the Garter (KG), 23 April 2003
- Privy Counsellor (PC), 2004

=== Arms ===
Coat of arms of Robin Butler, Baron Butler of Brockwell
| Notes Butler was granted armorial bearings 10 December 2003. Adopted 2003 Coronet Coronet of a Baron Crest Out of a Well a demi Badger Azure the head Argent and eye-stripes Azure. Torse Mantling Or and Azure. Escutcheon Azure a Cross flory and parted Or between four Covered Cups bases inwards Argent. Supporters On either side a Lion Argent armed and langued Azure and holding in the interior forepaw a Lymphad flags flying Or. Motto SERVIRE ET SERVARE; Latin: Serve and maintain Orders The Order of the Garter Banner The banner of the Baron Butler of Brockwell's arms used as Knight Companion of the Garter depicted at St George's Chapel. Badge A Martlet close Azure beaked and enfiling a Coronet Or. Symbolism The cross and martlet refer to University College, Oxford. The covered cups refer to the arms used by various families with the name of Butler. The badger (a brock) and the well refer to Brockwell in the peerage title of The Lord Butler of Brockwell. |

Government offices
| Preceded by Clive Whitmore | Principal Private Secretary to the Prime Minister; 1982–1985 | Succeeded by Nigel Wicks |
| Preceded by Sir Robert Armstrong | Cabinet Secretary & Head of the Home Civil Service; 1988–1998 | Succeeded by Sir Richard Wilson |
Academic offices
| Preceded by John Albery | Master of University College, Oxford; 1998–2008 | Succeeded by Sir Ivor Crewe |
Orders of precedence in the United Kingdom
| Preceded by The Lord Ryder of Wensum | Gentlemen; Baron Butler of Brockwell | Followed by The Lord Mackenzie of Framwellgate |
