= The Wilberforce Society =

Organization

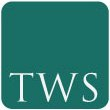
- Abbreviation: TWS
- Formation: 2009; 17 years ago
- Type: Public policy / Think tank
- Headquarters: University of Cambridge
- Patron: Lord Wilson of Dinton
- Executive Director: Rafael Karapetian
- Head of Policy: Isaac Lee & Suchir Salhan
- Website: thewilberforcesociety.co.uk

The Wilberforce Society (TWS) is an independent, non-partisan, student think tank, named after MP, Cambridge alumnus and abolitionist William Wilberforce, based at the University of Cambridge. It was founded in 2009 and is a registered charity. TWS aims to "promote constructive and intelligent debate" around the University of Cambridge, and "represents the views of moderate students," offering undergraduates and graduates "the opportunity to become involved with policy conception and analysis with the possibility of genuine impact." TWS follows an independent, diverse and non-partisan policy agenda set by the executive committee, but also carries out commissions for external organisations and public figures, which have included members of the House of Lords and the House of Commons.

Its work has included a major report on Brexit, which was commissioned by Daniel Zeichner MP and presented in-person at the European Parliament.

== Governance and functioning ==
The Wilberforce Society works in two main areas. Commissioned work comes from both private sector organisations and public bodies. For such assignments, members of the society group into committees, which work corporately over a period of weeks or months to produce a research paper. The paper is presented in an open lecture in front of academics, students, and members of the general public.

The second type of work is through individual and small group production of proposals. These proposals are then discussed at open meetings, to which a guest expert is invited. The guest helps establish the background of the policy area and helps to determine a suitable approach to the topic. Most proposals are published on the think tank's website.

In addition to policy research, the society functions at the centre of Cambridge student political life, as a focal point for mutual dialogue between students and frontline policymakers. TWS Ideas events provide a relaxed setting for informal debates on broad questions of public policy.

The society has established links with YouGov, the UK opinion polling and market research company. YouGov data is also used in policy papers.

Previous policy research has included commissions from Steve Barclay MP, End Rape on Campus, and Daniel Zeichner MP.

== Annual conference ==
The Wilberforce Society holds an annual conference. Previous speakers include Richard Kemp, Maajid Nawaz and the Rt Hon Rhodri Morgan. The 2013 conference was titled "We don't need no education?" and speakers included Lord Glasman and Martin Rees. The title for the 2014 conference was “Small Island. Big World. Visions of Britain in a Global Era” and was hosted at the Cambridge Union Society in early 2014. The 2015 conference, titled 'The Lost Generation', focused on youth disengagement, broken down into three sessions discussing employment, justice and politics. The 2016 conference, titled 'Technology: Challenging and Changing the State?' and examined E-Democracy, Technological Unemployment, Artificial Intelligence and Digital Media. The 2017 conference was titles "Global Disenchantment", examining the themes of Economic Disillusionment, Violent Extremism, Environmental Inaction and Dysfunction in the International Community, with speakers including Lord Stewart Wood and Brendan Simms.

== Committee ==
In June 2010, Lord Wilson of Dinton, former Head of the Home Civil Service, became Chair of the Board of Patrons of the Wilberforce Society. The Board also includes Baroness Prashar, Lord Kilclooney, Lord Rees of Ludlow, Lord Deben and Professor Andrew Gamble.

In July 2013 the Wilberforce Society was nominated in the "One to Watch" category at the Prospect Magazine annual think tank awards.

The society is led by an Executive Director, responsible for overseeing the management of the think tank, as well as a Policy Director, responsible for policy research. Recent leadership has included:

Year	Executive Director	Policy Director(s)
2025-2026	Rafael Karapetian	Isaac Lee and Suchir Salhan
2024-2025	Eliška Hauferová	Suchir Salhan and Ben Cartwright
2023-2024	Manuel Lara Aguado	Eliška Hauferová and Ben Brent
2022-2023	Eunice Chong	Michael Hadjivasiliou and Eunice Chong
2021-2022	George Stokes	Vishaal Ravi
2020-2021	Jemima Baar	Moni Owoade
2019-2020	Nicholas Francis Lui	Bryan Fong
2018-2019	Hattie Stacey	Christian Ruhl
