= Kenneth Barker (musicologist) =

British academic administrator (1934–2021)

Vice-Chancellor of Thames Valley University
- In office 1999–2003
- Preceded by: Mike Fitzgerald

Vice-Chancellor of De Montfort University
- In office 1992–1999
- Chancellor: Dame Anne Mueller; Sir Clive Whitmore; Dr John Granville White
- Preceded by: Office created
- Succeeded by: Philip Tasker

Personal details
- Born: 26 June 1934
- Died: 9 January 2021 (aged 86)

Kenneth Barker CBE (26 June 1934 – 9 January 2021) was a British academic administrator.

== Biography ==
He was educated at the Royal College of Music, King's College London (BMus) and the University of Sussex (MA). He served as Vice-Chancellor of De Montfort University from 1992 to 1999 and as Vice-Chancellor of Thames Valley University from 1999 to 2003.

He was appointed CBE in the 1994 Birthday Honours for services to higher education.

He died in January 2021.
