= Church of the Blessed Virgin Mary, Ashill =

Church in Somerset, England

Church of the Blessed Virgin Mary
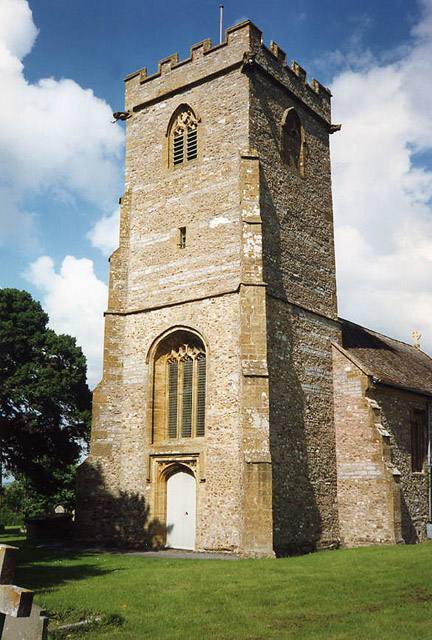

- Location within Somerset
- 50.9508°N 2.9678°W
- Location: Ashill, Somerset, England

Listed Building – Grade II*
- Official name: Church of the Blessed Virgin Mary
- Designated: 4 February 1958
- Reference no.: 1057100

The Anglican Church of the Blessed Virgin Mary in Ashill, Somerset, England was built in the 12th century. It is a Grade II* listed building.

== History ==
The church was built in the 12th and 13th centuries but has been revised several times since.

The parish is part of the Isle Valley benefice within the Diocese of Bath and Wells.

== Architecture ==
The stone buildings has tiled roofs. It consists of a three-bay nave and a single-bay chancel. The two-stage west tower is supported by corner buttresses.

The north and south doorways have decorated arches which may have survived from a previous church on the site before 1100.

Inside the church are a 17th-century pulpit and 15th century octagonal font.

== See also ==
- List of ecclesiastical parishes in the Diocese of Bath and Wells
