= Alexander Paterson (penologist) =

British penologist (1884–1947)

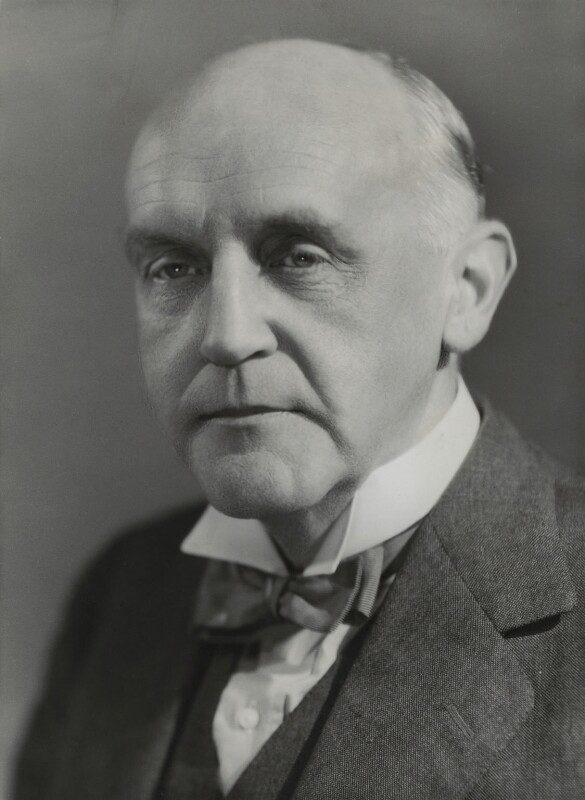
Paterson in 1939

Sir Alexander Henry Paterson MC (20 November 1884 – 7 November 1947), known to his friends as Alec Paterson, was a British penologist who as a Prison Commissioner introduced reforms that would provide a humane regime in penal institutions and encourage rehabilitation among inmates. He was the main force behind the development of Borstals and gained an international reputation as a great prison reformer.

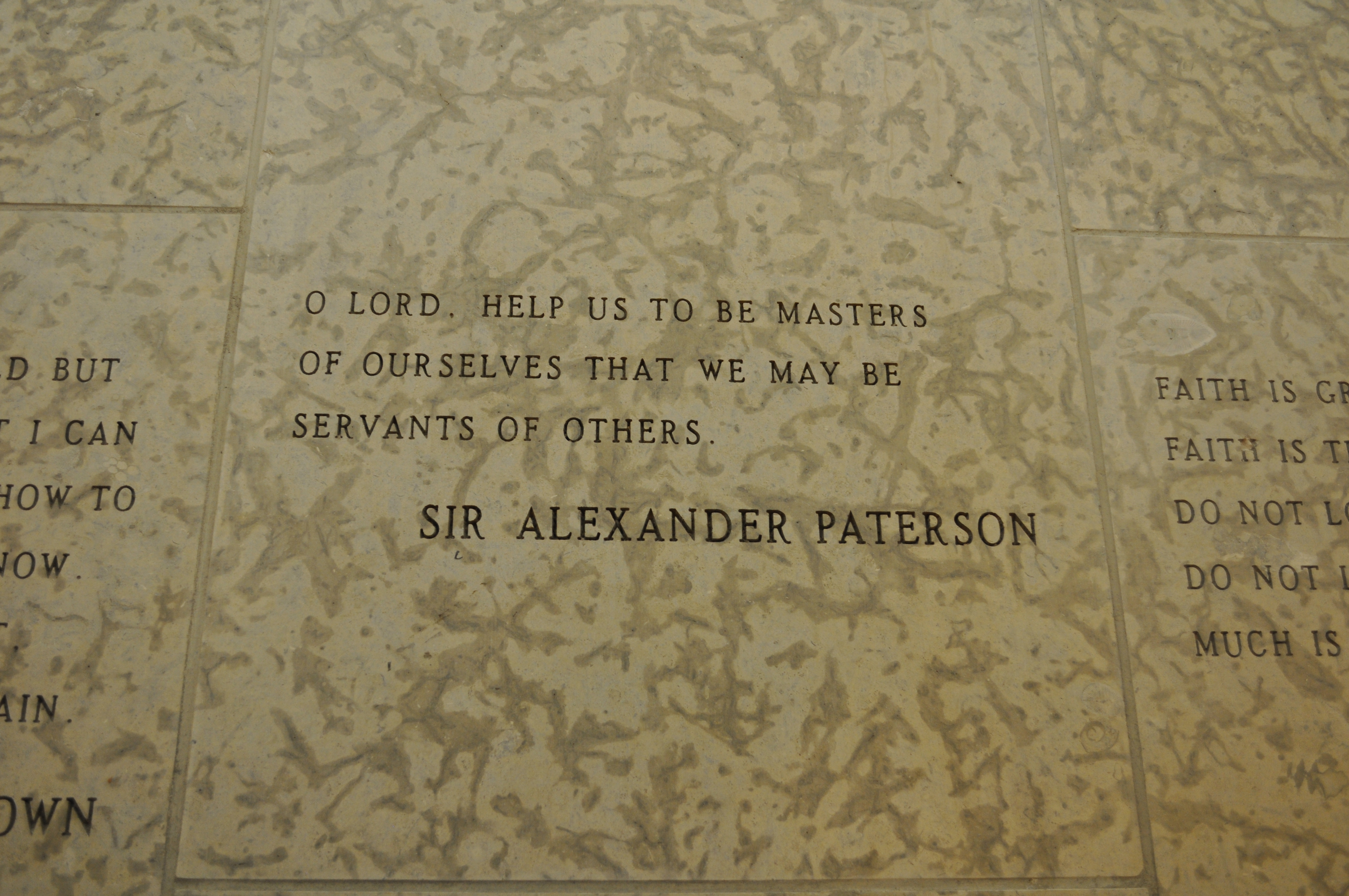
A quote by Sir Alexander Paterson engraved in the stone wall within the Peace Chapel of the International Peace Garden (in Manitoba Canada and North Dakota, USA).

Paterson was born in Bowdon, Cheshire. His parents were staunch Unitarians and Liberals, his father being the young Winston Churchill's electoral agent. Paterson attended Bowdon College, the local private school for boys, and later studied at University College, Oxford where he obtained an honours degree in Greats. During his time at Oxford, he may have become an Anglican although he was not to be confirmed into the Church of England until 1908. Not long after he graduated, Paterson went to work with the Oxford Medical Mission, a Christian charity established by John Stansfeld ('the Doctor') which provided free medical treatment for the locals and ran youth clubs for underprivileged boys in Bermondsey, South London. He worked as an unpaid teacher in an elementary school, and served as a voluntary probation officer. He was also appointed by the Home Secretary, Winston Churchill, as assistant director of the Central Association for the Aid of Discharged Convicts, and was also involved with Borstal Association. He recounted his experiences in Bermondsey in his enormously successful and influential book, Across the Bridges, published in 1911.

Paterson served in the Bermondsey Battalion (the Queens) of the London Regiment during World War I, enlisting as a private but reaching the rank of Captain and receiving a Military Cross. As a result of his close involvement in Talbot House during the Great War, he became the first chairman of the executive committee of the charitable organisation that grew out of it Toc H.

In 1922, he was appointed Commissioner of Prisons and Director of Convict Prisons, a position he held until his retirement in 1946.

During his period as Commissioner of Prisons, Paterson used Wakefield Prison as a testing ground for his reforms, such as establishing a farm within the prison in which inmates could learn agricultural skills. Prisoners were also allowed to earn small sums working, attend training courses and participate in games. In his view, the security of a prison's system was very important but it should not be dehumanizing. Among his initiatives to improve the prison system, he pointed out the problem of isolating prisoners, imposing the use of prison uniforms, and not monitoring prisoners after their release. In his views, the prison system should not dehumanize:

It should further provide such humanising and socialising influences as may be introduced from the normal world outside, and so far as is compatible with discipline and control, allow each man to develop along the lines of his own personality. To seek the production of a uniform type is to war against God who made men different, and to deprive a human being of that personality which should be his cherished possession. When the dangers of imprisonment have been averted, or at any rate mitigated, the administration is unlikely to rest content. It cannot be content merely to remit to society after an appropriate period a felon who is just the same in heart and character as when he lost his freedom. Nor indeed is it credible that any man should endure such an experience without any change. The prison authorities aim a little higher, and try to make their regime such that in all cases where an improvement can be effected within the circumscribed limits of prison life, a man shall receive some definite training in habit and character.

— Paterson's The Prison Problem of America

During his long tenure he became the foremost authority on prisons in the world, visited many countries throughout the Empire and beyond to advise on penal matters, and was an expert witness before many parliamentary and departmental committees. In 1935 at the International Penal and Penitentiary Congress held in Berlin he led a successful attempt to thwart the Nazis hijacking the whole conference for propaganda purposes. During the Second World War, apart from visiting the West African colonies and war-blasted Malta, he was sent to Canada to sort the refugee sheep from the Nazi goats among the 'enemy alien' internees' sent there from Britain. His report on this issue is as a compassionate response as it is a searing indictment of their treatment, and, as with so many of his reports, immensely readable and hugely effective. Stricken with malaria and worn out by his exertions, he reluctantly retired at the end of 1946 from his post as Commissioner, although he was retained as a consultant by his colleagues.

Paterson was knighted in 1947 and died shortly afterwards in London at the age of 62.
