= Alexander Isserlis =

British civil servant (1922–1986)

Alexander Reginald Isserlis (18 May 1922 – 20 December 1986), sometimes called Sandy Isserlis, was a British civil servant who served as Principal Private Secretary to the Prime Minister of the United Kingdom in 1970.

Isserlis did not serve as Edward Heath's private secretary because he had been "personally close" to Heath's predecessor Harold Wilson.

== Works ==
Isserlis was author of:

- Regional Devolution and National Government (1975)
- Corporatism and Social Policy (1976)
- The Usefulness of Political Science to the Public Service (1978)
- Plus Ca Change (1981)
- Conversations on Policy (1984).
