= Ashill, Somerset =

Village in Somerset, England

Coordinates: 50.9511°N 2.9664°W

Ashill
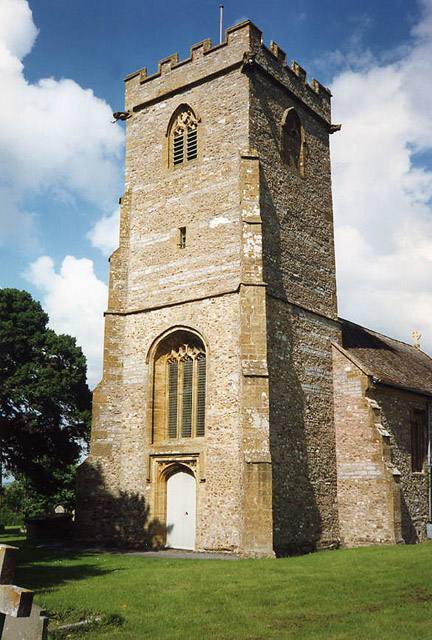
- Church of the Blessed Virgin Mary, Ashill

- Location within Somerset
- Population: 529 (2011)
- OS grid reference: ST3217
- Unitary authority: Somerset Council
- Ceremonial county: Somerset
- Region: South West
- Country: England
- Sovereign state: United Kingdom
- Post town: Ilminster
- Postcode district: TA19
- Dialling code: 01460
- Police: Avon and Somerset
- Fire: Devon and Somerset
- Ambulance: South Western
- UK Parliament: Yeovil

Ashill is a small village and civil parish in Somerset, England, situated 7 miles (11.3 km) south of Taunton, and three miles north-west of Ilminster. The parish includes the hamlet of Windmill Hill and has a population of 529.

It has a small junior school, a village pub named The Ashill Inn, a village hall and a playing field.

== History ==
Ashill is mentioned in the Domesday Book for its extensive woodland. The manor passed from the de Vaux family to Sir Thomas Moulton by 1317, and then through the Stretche and Beauchamp families to the Spekes who built Jordans as their mansion, which was demolished in the 1960s, although the grotto/summer house (dating from 1828) in the grounds survives. The grotto is on the Heritage at Risk Register due to vandalism despite re-thatching.

Ashill was part of the hundred of Abdick and Bulstone.

== Governance ==
The parish council has responsibility for local issues, including setting an annual precept (local rate) to cover the council's operating costs and producing annual accounts for public scrutiny. The parish council evaluates local planning applications and works with the local police, district council officers, and neighbourhood watch groups on matters of crime, security, and traffic. The parish council's role also includes initiating projects for the maintenance and repair of parish facilities, as well as consulting with the district council on the maintenance, repair, and improvement of highways, drainage, footpaths, public transport, and street cleaning. Conservation matters (including trees and listed buildings) and environmental issues are also the responsibility of the council.

For local government purposes, since 1 April 2023, the village comes under the unitary authority of Somerset Council. Prior to this, it was part of the non-metropolitan district of South Somerset, which was formed on 1 April 1974 under the Local Government Act 1972, having previously been part of Chard Rural District.

It is also part of the Yeovil county constituency represented in the House of Commons of the Parliament of the United Kingdom. It elects one Member of Parliament (MP) by the first past the post system of election. Prior to Brexit in 2020 it was part of the South West England constituency of the European Parliament.

== Church ==
The church is named The Church of the Virgin Mary and dates from the 12th or 13th century, with various later alterations. It has been designated by English Heritage as a Grade II* listed building. The old rectory has some 16th-century fragments but was largely rebuilt around 1800.

== Places of interest ==
- The late 15th-century Rowland's Farm is the home of the Speke family.
- Rowland's Mill is a Hamstone watermill dating from the 17th century.
- 18th-century cider house.
