= Edward Troup (civil servant, born 1857) =

British civil servant (1857–1941)

Sir Edward Troup KCB KCVO
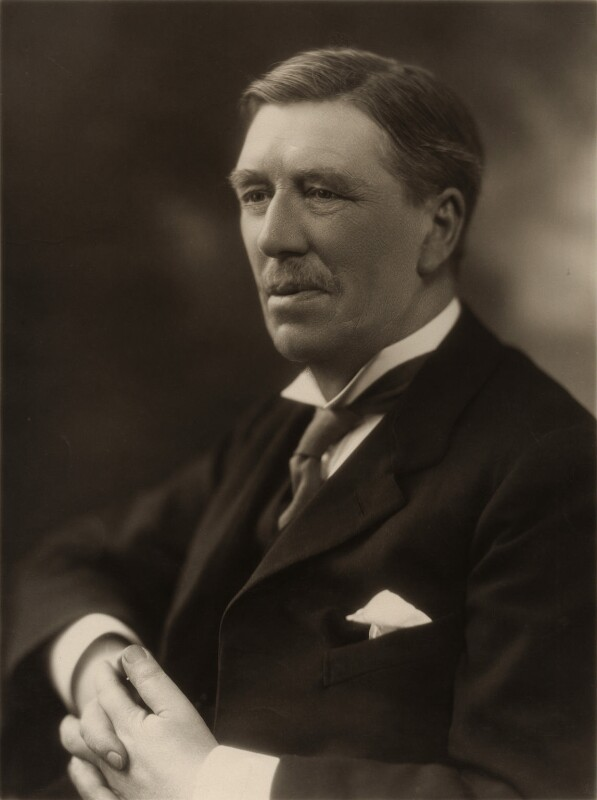
- Troup in 1924
- Born: 27 March 1857; Huntly, Aberdeenshire
- Died: 8 July 1941 (aged 84); Kensington
- Occupation: civil servant
- Spouse: Winifred Louisa MacDonald

Sir Charles Edward Troup KCB KCVO (27 March 1857 – 8 July 1941) was a British civil servant. Born in Scotland, he worked for most of his life in London. He was Permanent Under-Secretary of State at the Home Office from 1908 to 1922.

Troup was born in Huntly, Aberdeenshire. His father was a minister of an Independent church. He was educated at the local parish school and then read mental philosophy at the University of Aberdeen. He studied at Balliol College, Oxford, graduating in 1883, and winning a prize of an essay later published in 1884 as Future of Free Trade.

He joined the Home Office as a junior clerk in 1880, in its criminal department, and was promoted to senior clerk in 1886. He was called to the bar at Middle Temple in 1888. He edited the official judicial statistics of England and Wales from 1893 to 1904. He was also involved in committees that recommended the introduction of biometric data of criminals, including photographs and fingerprints, and a committee that recommended the introduction of cremation.

He became a principal clerk in 1896, and rose to become Permanent Under-Secretary of State at the Home Office in 1908, including the peak of the suffragette movement, the First World War and the introduction of regulations under the Defence of the Realm Act 1914, and then the period of police strikes in 1918-19.

He became a Commander of the Order of the Bath (CB) in 1897, advanced to Knight Commander of the Order of the Bath (KCB) in 1909, and became a Knight Commander of the Royal Victorian Order (KCVO) in 1918. He retired from the Home Office in 1922. He published a book, Home Office, in 1925.

He was Chairman of Royal Irish Constabulary Tribunal in 1922-1923, and then involved in mine safety from 1923 to 1939. He also worked on the special grants committee of the Ministry of Pensions in the 1930s, and was a treasurer of King's College London from 1922 to 1939.

He married Winifred Louisa MacDonald in January 1897; she was the daughter of George MacDonald and Louisa Powell. They had no children.

He died in at home in Kensington, of arteriosclerosis. He was cremated at Golders Green Crematorium.
