= Shenyang International Finance Center =

- Interactive map of the Shenyang International Finance Center area

General information
- Status: Stale proposal
- Type: Office
- Location: Shenyang; People's Republic of China
- Coordinates: 41.814422°N 123.435908°E

Height
- Antenna spire: 428 m (1,404 ft)
- Roof: 428 m (1,404 ft)

Technical details
- Floor count: 89
- Floor area: 570,000 m^{2} (6,135,000 sq ft)

The Shenyang International Finance Center (Chinese: 瀋陽國際金融中心) is a late modernist supertall skyscraper proposed for construction in Shenyang, China. The office tower is set to rise 427 metres (1,401 ft) and contain 89 floors, plus three basement levels. Construction of the 570,000 square metres (6,135,000 sq ft)-glass and steel building was expected to be complete in 2012, however as of 29 June 2024, it has not been completed.
