= Rose Rock International Finance Center =

Proposed skyscraper in Tianjin, China

- 罗斯洛克国际金融中心
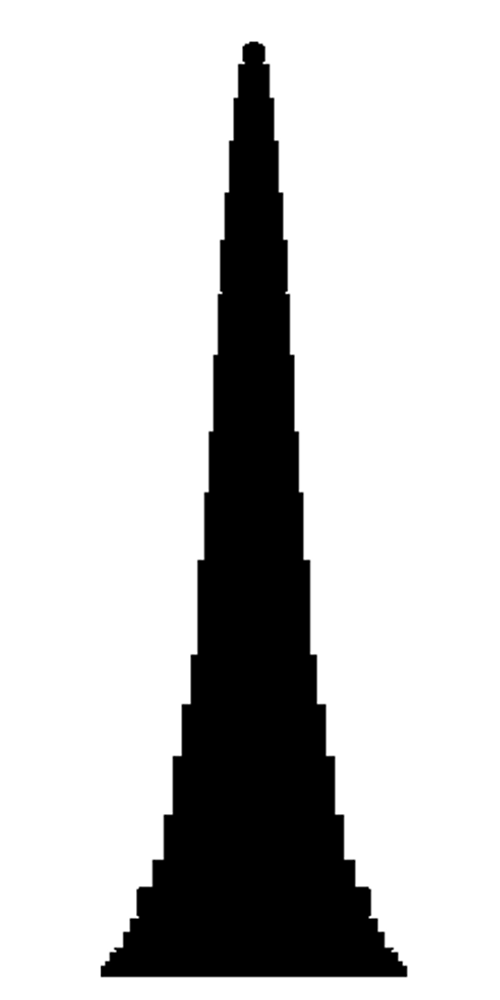
- Rose Rock International Finance Center

General information
- Status: Never Completed
- Location: Sanhuai Road, Tianjin, China
- Construction started: 2011

Height
- Height: 588 m (1,929 ft)

Technical details
- Floor count: 125
- Floor area: 370,000 m^{2} (4,000,000 sq ft)

Rose Rock International Finance Center (Rose Rock IFC) is a skyscraper that was supposed to have been built in Yujiapu Financial District, Tianjin, China. It was planned to be 588 metres (1,929 ft) tall with 125 floors. A groundbreaking celebration was held on December 16, 2011.

At the request of the Rose Rock Group, the Bjarke Ingels Group in collaboration with HKS, Inc. and Arup Group, came up with a design for the proposed $2.35 billion building. The Architect's Newspaper said of the design, "Renderings show a terraced pyramidal tower with a palpable vertical thrust and clear reference to the Art-Deco stylings of its inspiration, the Rockefeller Center in New York." The proposed center would have six buildings. The Rose Rock Group was founded by Steven C. Rockefeller Jr., Steven C. Rockefeller III, who are members of the Rockefeller family, and Collin C. Eckles. The Rose Rock Group and Tianjin Finance Investment Co created the Rose Rock (Tianjin) Equity Investment Fund Management Co. in August 2011 to secure money to construct Rose Rock IFC.

Reuters said in 2018 that Rose Rock IFC typified Tianjin's troubles in that the building still had not been constructed and had become a rose garden.
