= Jersey Financial Services Commission =

Regulatory body in Jersey

Agency overview
- Jurisdiction: Jersey
- Headquarters: 11-15 Seaton Place, St Helier, Jersey; 49.1860°N 2.1112°W
- Employees: 140 (2018)
- Annual budget: £17 million (2018)
- Agency executives: Jane Platt CBE, Chair; Jill Britton, Director General
- Website: jerseyfsc.org

The Jersey Financial Services Commission (JFSC) is the regulatory body for financial services in Jersey. It is also the Registrar of Companies for Jersey.

== History ==
The JFSC was set up as an independent body by law in 1998. Its responsibilities include the regulation of the banking and finance sectors, the registration of companies in Jersey, and "promoting the Island as a centre for financial services".

The law was later amended to remove the latter mission and Jersey Finance was created.

Since then, the commission has been responsible for the implementation of the gradually tighter regulation of the offshore financial activity in Jersey, under international pressure against money laundering and tax avoidance.

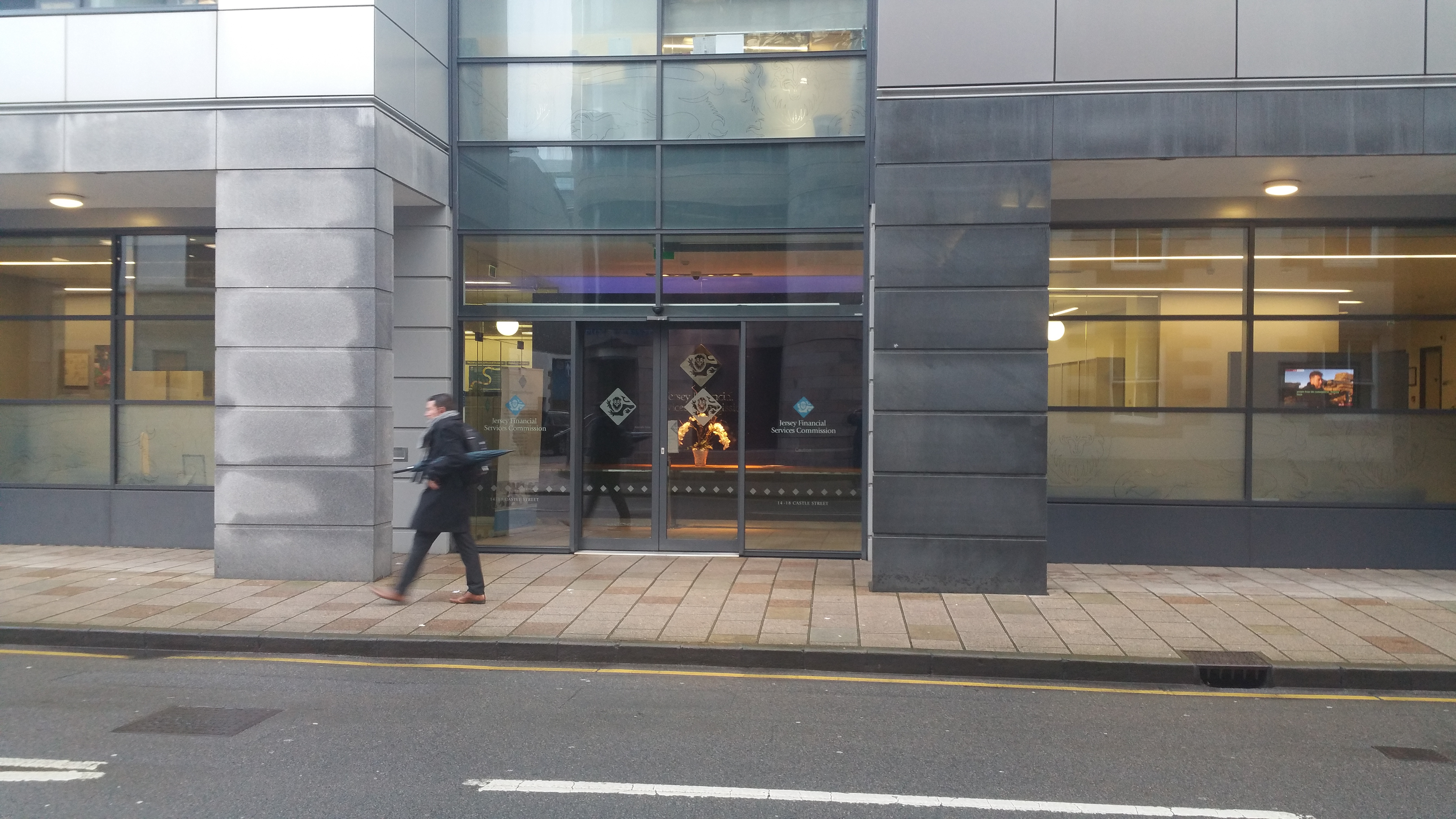
Old headquarters of the JFSC

== Leadership ==
Following the appointment of former Director General Martin Moloney as Secretary General of IOSCO, Jill Britton was appointed the Commission's Director General in 2021, the first woman to hold the role.

Mark Hoban became Chair of the Commission in April 2020, succeeding John Eatwell.

== See also ==
- List of financial supervisory authorities by country
