= Russell Scott (civil servant) =

British civil servant (1877 - 1960)

Sir Robert Russell Scott, KCB, CSI (30 December 1877 - 16 March 1960) was a British civil servant.

Born on 30 December 1877, Scott was the son of Rev. Adam Scott of Sale and Southport. He attended Manchester Grammar School and Wadham College, Oxford, graduating with a classics degree in 1900. He entered the civil service in 1901 as an official in the Admiralty. In 1912, he served as secretary to the Royal Commission on Indian Public Services and three years later was appointed to the Central Control Board, before returning to the Admiralty in 1917.

In 1921, Scott was appointed deputy controller of establishments in HM Treasury; in 1922, he was promoted to full controller. Under his direction, the civil service underwent a period of reorganisation following the National Whitley Council's reports. He remained at the Treasury until 1932, when he was appointed permanent secretary of the Home Office, where he remained until retiring in 1938. Towards the end of his tenure, he was involved in developing the Air Raid Precaution plans.

Scott was appointed a Companion of the Order of the Star of India (CSI) in the 1916 New Year Honours, a Companion of the Order of the Bath (CB) in 1919 Birthday Honours, and a Knight Commander of the Order of the Bath (KCB) in the 1922 Birthday Honours. He died on 16 March 1960.

Government offices
Preceded by Sir John Anderson	Permanent Secretary, Home Office; 1932–1938	Succeeded by Sir Alexander Maxwell
