= Departments of the Government of the United Kingdom =

The Government of the United Kingdom is divided into departments that each have responsibility, according to the government, for putting government policy into practice. There are currently 24 ministerial departments, 20 non-ministerial departments, and 422 agencies and other public bodies, for a total of 465 departments.

== Ministerial departments ==
Ministerial departments are generally the most high-profile government departments and differ from the other two types of government departments in that they include ministers. A list of all ministerial departments is shown below.

| Ministerial department | Minister responsible | Civil servant responsible | Ref. |
|---|---|---|---|
| Attorney General's Office | Ellie Reeves; Attorney General | Douglas Wilson; Director-General | |
| Cabinet Office | Louise Haigh; First Secretary of State; Minister for the Cabinet Office; Chancellor of the Duchy of Lancaster | Cat Little; Permanent Secretary; Chief Operating Officer of the Civil Service | |
| Department for Business, Innovation, Science and Trade | Jonathan Reynolds; Secretary of State for Business, Innovation, Science and Trade | Amanda Brooks; Interim Permanent Secretary | |
| Department for Digital, Culture, Media and Sport | Lisa Nandy; Secretary of State for Digital, Culture, Media and Sport | Susannah Storey; Permanent Secretary | |
| Department for Education | Lucy Powell; Secretary of State for Education | Susan Acland-Hood; Permanent Secretary | |
| Department for Energy Security and Net Zero | Miatta Fahnbulleh; Secretary of State for Energy Security and Net Zero | Jonathan Brearley; Permanent Secretary | |
| Department for Environment, Food and Rural Affairs | Dame Angela Eagle; Secretary of State for Environment, Food and Rural Affairs | Paul Kissack; Permanent Secretary | |
| Department for Transport | Heidi Alexander; Secretary of State for Transport | Jo Shanmugalingam; Permanent Secretary | |
| Department for Work and Pensions | Pat McFadden; Secretary of State for Work and Pensions | Dame Sarah Healey; Permanent Secretary | |
| Department of Health and Social Care | Yvette Cooper; Secretary of State for Health and Social Care | Samantha Jones; Permanent Secretary | |
| Export Credits Guarantee Department (trading as UK Export Finance) | Jonathan Reynolds; President of the Board of Trade | Tim Reid; Chief Executive | |
| Foreign, Commonwealth and Development Office | Ed Miliband; Secretary of State for Foreign, Commonwealth and Development Affairs | Lindy Cameron | |
| HM Treasury | John Healey; Chancellor of the Exchequer; Second Lord of the Treasury | James Bowler; Permanent Secretary | |
| Home Office | Shabana Mahmood; Secretary of State for the Home Department | Gareth Davies; Permanent Secretary | |
| Ministry of Defence | Wes Streeting; Secretary of State for Defence | Jeremy Pocklington; Permanent Secretary | |
| Ministry of Housing, Communities and Local Government | Angela Rayner; Secretary of State for Housing, Communities and Local Government | Tom Riordan | |
| Ministry of Justice | Alex Norris; Secretary of State for Justice; Lord Chancellor | Jo Farrar; Permanent Secretary; Clerk of the Crown in Chancery | |
| Northern Ireland Office | Sir Chris Bryant; Secretary of State for Northern Ireland | Julie Harrison; Permanent Secretary | |
| Office for the Prime Minister and Cabinet (Note: Part of the Cabinet Office.) | Andy Burnham; Prime Minister; First Lord of the Treasury; Minister for the Union; Minister for the Civil Service | Dame Antonia Romeo; Cabinet Secretary; Head of the Civil Service | |
| Office of the Advocate General for Scotland | Catherine Smith, Baroness Smith of Cluny; Advocate General for Scotland | Neil Taylor; Director; Solicitor to the Advocate General | |
| Office of the Leader of the House of Commons | Sir Alan Campbell; Leader of the House of Commons; Lord President of the Council | N/A | |
| Office of the Leader of the House of Lords | Angela Smith, Baroness Smith of Basildon; Leader of the House of Lords; Lord Privy Seal | N/A | |
| Scotland Office | Douglas Alexander; Secretary of State for Scotland | Fiona Mettam; Director | |
| Wales Office | Stephen Kinnock; Secretary of State for Wales | Ciarán Hayes; Director | |

== Non-ministerial departments ==
Non-ministerial government departments are headed by civil servants and usually have a regulatory or inspection function. A list of all non-ministerial departments is below.

- Charity Commission for England and Wales
- Competition and Markets Authority
- Crown Prosecution Service
- Food Standards Agency
- Forestry Commission
- Government Actuary's Department
- Government Legal Department
- HM Land Registry
- HM Revenue and Customs
- National Savings and Investments
- National Archives
- National Crime Agency
- Office for Standards in Education, Children's Services and Skills
- Office of Gas and Electricity Markets
- Office of Qualifications and Examinations Regulation
- Office of Rail and Road
- Serious Fraud Office
- Supreme Court of the United Kingdom
- UK Statistics Authority
- Water Services Regulation Authority

== Agencies and other public bodies ==
Government departments in this third and final category can generally be split into five types:

- Executive agencies, which usually provide government services rather than decide policy
- Executive non-departmental public bodies, which do work for the government in specific areas
- Advisory non-departmental public bodies, which provide independent and expert advice to ministers
- Tribunal non-departmental public bodies, which are part of the justice system and have jurisdiction over a specific area of the law
- Independent monitoring boards, which are responsible for the running of prisons and the treatment of prisoners

== See also ==
- Prime Minister's Office (United Kingdom)
- Politics of the United Kingdom
- Civil Service
