= Economic and Domestic Affairs Secretariat =

UK Cabinet Office secretariat

The Economic and Domestic Affairs Secretariat (EDS) is a secretariat in the United Kingdom Cabinet Office.

It supports the prime minister of the United Kingdom and Minister for the Cabinet Office develop, co-ordinate and agree the UK government's domestic policy across the departments of state; with foreign and security policy co-ordinated by the separate National Security Secretariat (NSS). Together these two secretariats form the core of what is the Cabinet Secretariat, and are the traditional redoubts of high fliers in the UK civil service.

The head of EDS, who reports directly to the Cabinet Secretary, is a director general (or, before the mid-'90s renaming, a deputy secretary). It is widely regarded as one of the most powerful roles in the Civil Service due to having regular access to the prime minister, other cabinet-level ministers and their private secretaries, as well as the most senior officials in Whitehall to ensure 'collective agreement'. Without collective agreement and the issuing of a 'clearance' from EDS, departments cannot progress with policy announcements or take forward high profile and significant projects. In order to fulfil its duties, EDS officials work very closely with their counterparts in HM Treasury, 10 Downing Street and other teams in the Cabinet Office such as the Prime Minister's Delivery Unit.

The head of EDS (and more recently the head of the Cabinet Secretariats) is sometimes referred to as the Deputy Cabinet Secretary, due to running Cabinet and its subcommittees, as well as brokering policy decisions across government on behalf of the prime minister and his senior advisers.

== List of directors general of the Economic and Domestic Affairs Secretariat ==
- Peter Francis Owen (1990–1994)
- Kenneth Mackenzie (1995–1997)
- Sir Nicholas Montagu (1997)
- Sir Robin Young (1997–1998)
- Sir Suma Chakrabarti (2000–2001)
- Sir Paul Britton (2001–2009)
- Sir Chris Wormald (2009–2011)
- Melanie Dawes (2011–2015)
- Antonia Romeo (2015)
- Jonathan Slater (2015–2016)
- Shona Dunn (2016–2018)
- Sarah Healey (2018–2019)
- Mark Sweeney (2019 – October 2022)
- Nicholas Joicey (2022–2023)
- Emma Churchill (2023–2026)
- Juliet Chua (2026–present)
