= David Hancock (civil servant) =

English civil servant

Sir David John Stowell Hancock, KCB (27 March 1934 – 24 September 2013) was an English civil servant. Educated at Balliol College, Oxford, he entered the civil service in 1957 as an official in the Board of Trade; he moved to HM Treasury in 1959 and spent 1965–66 as a Harkness Fellow at the Brookings Institution and Harvard University. He was private secretary to the Chancellor of the Exchequer from 1968 to 1970, then financial and economic counsellor to the permanent representative to the European Communities until 1974. He was at the Treasury until 1982, when he was made head of the European Secretariat at the Cabinet Office. From 1983 to 1989, he was Permanent Secretary of the Department of Education and Science, overseeing the introduction of GCSEs and the drafting and implementation of the Education Reform Act 1988.

Government offices
Preceded by Sir Michael Franklin	Head of the European Secretariat; 1982–1983	Succeeded by David Williamson
Preceded by Sir James Arnot Hamilton	Permanent Secretary of the Department for Education and Science; 1983–1989	Succeeded by Sir John Caines
