= Chris Wormald =

British civil servant (born 1968)

The Right Honourable The Lord Wormald KCB
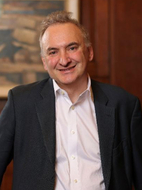
- Official portrait, 2025

Cabinet Secretary; Head of the Civil Service
- In office 16 December 2024 – 12 February 2026
- Prime Minister: Keir Starmer
- Preceded by: Simon Case
- Succeeded by: Dame Antonia Romeo

Permanent Secretary of the Department of Health and Social Care
- In office 1 May 2016 – 16 December 2024
- Minister: Jeremy Hunt; Matt Hancock; Sajid Javid; Thérèse Coffey; Steve Barclay; Victoria Atkins; Wes Streeting
- Preceded by: Dame Una O'Brien
- Succeeded by: Samantha Jones

Permanent Secretary of the Department for Education
- In office 26 March 2012 – 30 April 2016
- Prime Minister: David Cameron
- Minister: Michael Gove; Nicky Morgan
- Preceded by: Sir David Bell
- Succeeded by: Jonathan Slater

Member of the House of Lords
- Lord Temporal
- Life peerage 27 August 2026

Personal details
- Born: Christopher Stephen Wormald; 30 October 1968 (age 57)
- Party: Crossbench
- Education: St John's College, Oxford (BA); Imperial College London (MBA)

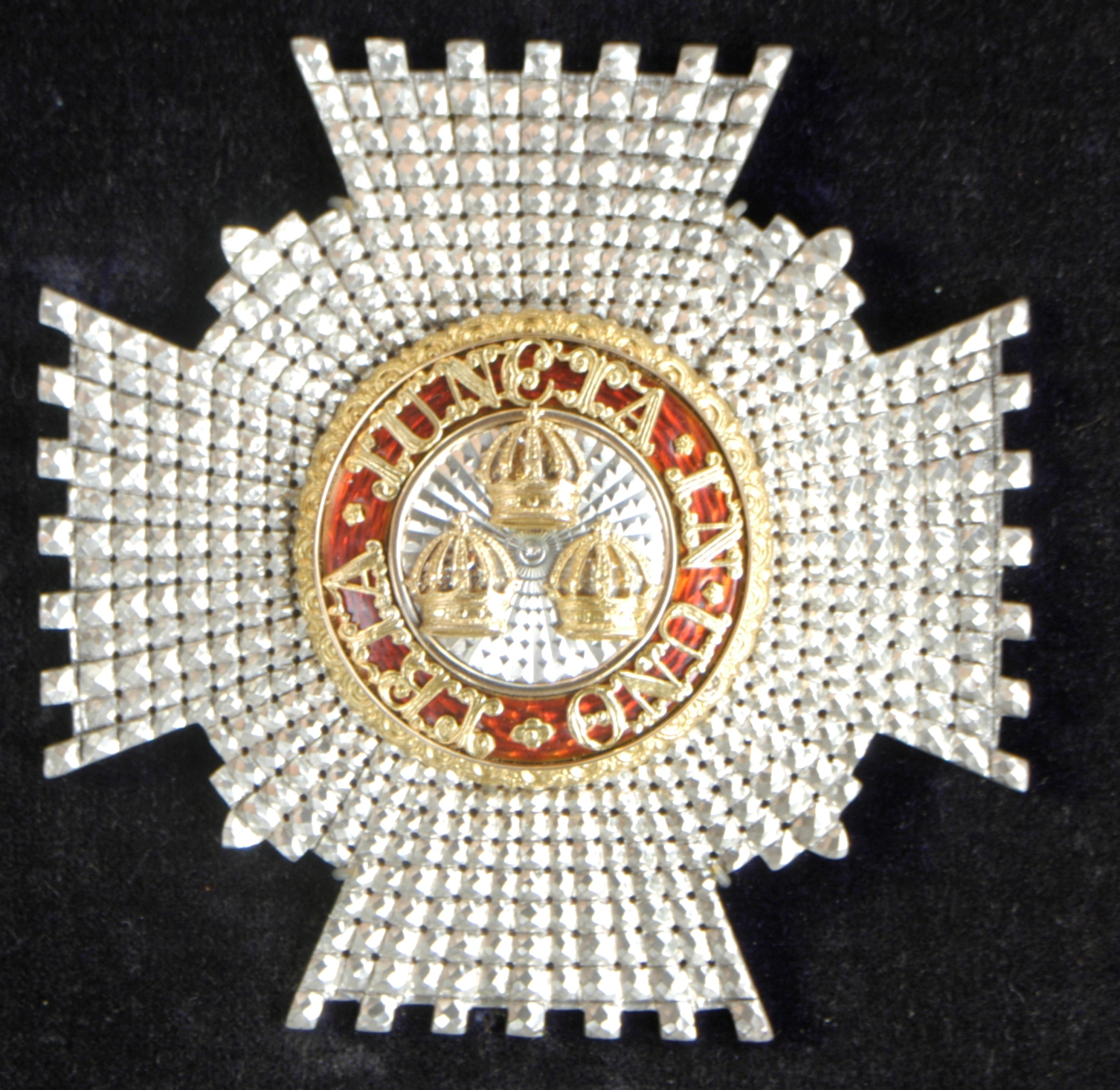
KCB breast star

Christopher Stephen Wormald, Baron Wormald KCB (born 30 October 1968) is a British civil servant who served as Cabinet Secretary and Head of the Civil Service from 2024 to 2026.

== Early life ==
The son of Peter Wormald CB and Elizabeth née North, he was educated at Rutlish School in Merton before going to St John's College, Oxford, graduating BA (1990). He then pursued postgraduate studies at Imperial College, London, taking an MBA degree (1999).

His father was a Deputy Secretary at the Department for Health and Social Security from 1978, then Registrar General for England and Wales 1990–96.

== Career ==
Wormald joined the Civil Service in 1991, working in the Department for Education (later the Department for Education and Employment). Rising to Principal Private Secretary to the Secretary of State for Education and Skills from 2001 until 2004, he then worked on the Academies programme.

In 2006 Wormald transferred to the newly formed Department for Communities and Local Government (DCLG), promoted to be Director-General of Local Government and Regeneration. In 2009, he moved to the Cabinet Office as the Head of the Economic and Domestic Affairs Secretariat, succeeding Sir Paul Britton. Following the general election in 2010 and the consequent change in the position of Deputy Prime Minister, Wormald additionally became Head of the Deputy Prime Minister's Office.

In March 2012, Wormald left the Cabinet Office to return to the Department for Education as its Permanent Secretary, replacing Sir David Bell, who had retired to be the Vice-Chancellor of the University of Reading. Wormald served under both Michael Gove and Nicky Morgan during their tenures as Secretary of State for Education.

As of 2015, Wormald was paid a salary of between £160,000 and £164,999 by DCLG, making him one of the 328 most highly paid people in the British public sector at that time. In January 2016 it was announced that Wormald would transfer to the Department of Health and Social Care later in 2016, replacing Dame Una O'Brien after her retirement as its Permanent Secretary.

Wormald was appointed Knight Commander of the Order of the Bath (KCB) in the 2017 Birthday Honours.

In December 2024, it was announced that Wormald would take over from Simon Case as Cabinet Secretary and Head of the Civil Service. His appointment was criticised by the Covid 19 Bereaved Families for Justice UK group claiming he had "refused in the UK COVID Inquiry to accept failures on behalf of the Department of Health and Social Care".

In July 2025 it was reported that prime minister Sir Keir Starmer and his political aides had "buyer's remorse" over their choice of Wormald as the cabinet secretary due to him being perceived as too entrenched in the status quo to deliver radical reform.

In October 2025 Dave Penman, general secretary of the FDA, said attacks on Wormald "stink of political cowardice", as concerns mounted inside the government about his performance. Penman said anonymous criticism was "hugely damaging". "Chris Wormald is the civil servant's civil servant. That is apparently what Starmer wanted, someone who won't be making headlines", Penman said.

On 9 February 2026 it was reported that Wormald was negotiating terms for his resignation. The Guardian, which first reported the news, said that some of those close to Starmer viewed his appointment as "disastrous". His departure came amid a wider political crisis linked to the scandal surrounding Peter Mandelson and his connections to Jeffrey Epstein, which had triggered multiple resignations within the government. Wormald stepped down as Cabinet Secretary on 12 February 2026. Government accounts report "contractual compensation" of £332,897 and "additional severance" of £526,598.

The Prime Minister's Office announced on 16 July 2026 that Wormald is to be made a crossbench peer. He was created Baron Wormald, of Dulwich in the London Borough of Lambeth on 27 August 2026.

Government offices
Preceded by Sir David Bell	Permanent Secretary of the Department for Education; 2012–2016	Succeeded by Jonathan Slater
Preceded by Dame Una O'Brien	Permanent Secretary of the Department of Health and Social Care; 2016–2024	Succeeded by Sir Chris Whitty
Preceded by Simon Case	Head of the Home Civil Service; Cabinet Secretary; 2024–2026	Succeeded by Dame Antonia Romeo
