= Kamran Nazeer =

British civil servant & author (born 1978)

Emran Mian CB OBE
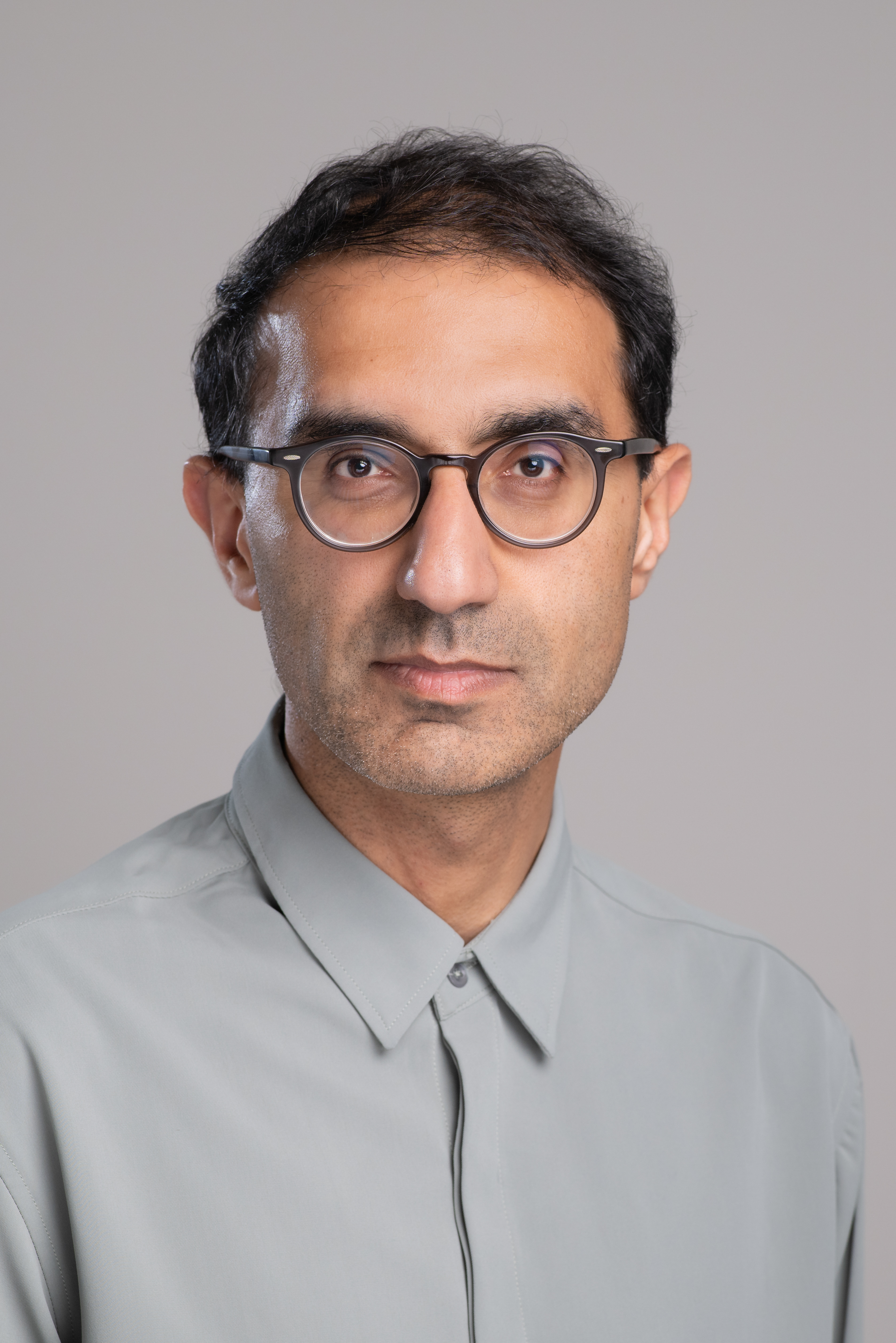
- Mian in 2024

Permanent Secretary of the Department for Science, Innovation and Technology
- In office July 2025 – July 2026
- Prime Minister: Keir Starmer
- Minister: Peter Kyle; Liz Kendall
- Preceded by: Sarah Munby
- Succeeded by: department abolished

Personal details
- Born: 1978 (age 47–48)
- Occupation: Civil servant
- Website: gov.uk/government/people/emran-mian

Emran Mian CB OBE (born 1978), who writes under the pen name Kamran Nazeer, is a British Pakistani author and civil servant.

== Life and career ==
Nazeer was born as Emran Mian in Glasgow, and was diagnosed with autism at the age of four. He studied law in Glasgow, but after deciding not to become a lawyer, he then went to Corpus Christi College, Cambridge for his PhD and finally joined the British civil service as a policy adviser in Whitehall. He now lives in London with his French wife. He was Director General for Digital Technologies and Telecoms at the Department for Science, Innovation and Technology (DSIT) and in July 2025 became the Permanent Secretary of the department.

His first book, Send In the Idiots: Stories From the Other Side of Autism, was published in March 2006 under his penname. He is also a frequent contributor to Prospect magazine.

== Awards and nominations ==
Mian was appointed Officer of the Order of the British Empire (OBE) in the 2011 Birthday Honours, and Companion of the Order of the Bath (CB) in the 2023 Birthday Honours for services to regeneration.

In January 2014, Mian was nominated for the Civil Servant of the Year award at the British Muslim Awards.

== Selected works ==
- Send In the Idiots: Stories From the Other Side of Autism, ISBN 1-58234-619-4
- "The Curious Case of Exclusionary Reasons", Canadian Journal of Law and Jurisprudence, Volume XV, Number 1 (January 2002) pp. 99–124
- "Mandarin intellectuals", Prospect (July 2006)
