= David Williams (civil servant) =

British under-secretary of state for defence (2021-)

David Williams CB
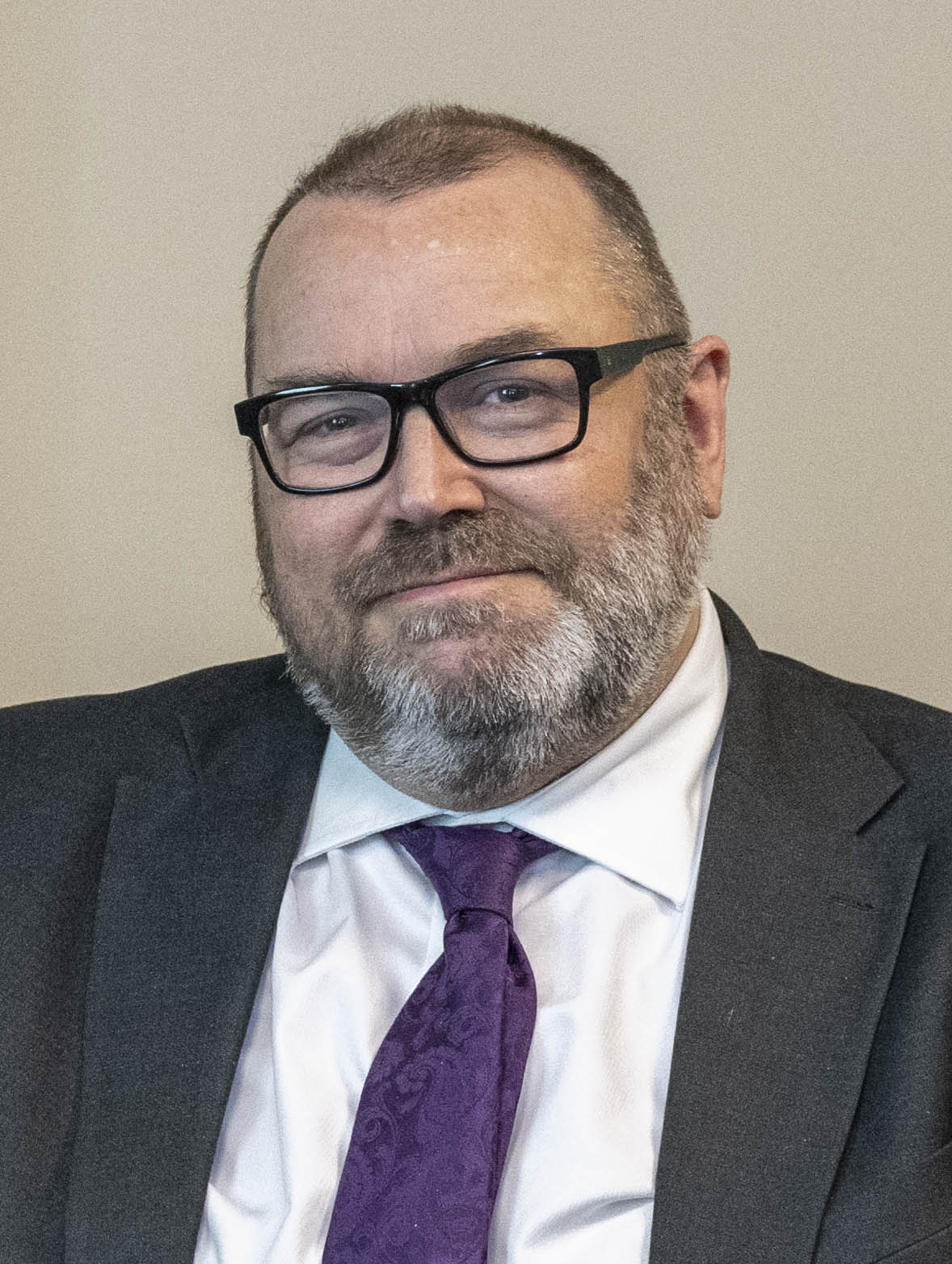
- Williams in 2024

Permanent Under-Secretary of State for Defence
- In office April 2021 – October 2025
- Sec. of State: Ben Wallace; Grant Shapps; John Healey; Wes Streeting
- Preceded by: Stephen Lovegrove
- Succeeded by: Jeremy Pocklington

Second Permanent Secretary at the Department of Health and Social Care
- In office March 2020 – April 2021
- Prime Minister: Boris Johnson
- Sec. of State: Matt Hancock
- Preceded by: Office established
- Succeeded by: Shona Dunn

Personal details
- Born: December 1968 (age 57)
- Education: Corpus Christi College, Oxford
- Occupation: Civil servant

David Peter Williams CB (born December 1968) is a British civil servant who has served as the permanent under-secretary of state for defence since April 2021.

== Career ==
From 2015, Williams served in various administrative positions in both the Department of Health and Social Care and the Ministry of Defence. In March 2020, at the beginning of the COVID-19 outbreak in the United Kingdom, he was appointed second permanent secretary at the Department of Health and Social Care.

In April 2021 he became the permanent under-secretary of state for defence, succeeding Stephen Lovegrove. As Permanent Secretary his responsibilities include "the overall organisation, management and staffing of defence". In the wake of the data breach in February 2022 by an individual at the headquarters of the UK Special Forces, a Defence Review led to a major reorganisation of the department, and Williams is to be replaced in autumn 2025.

He is a policy leaders fellow at the University of Cambridge's Centre for Science and Policy.

== Honours ==
Williams was appointed Companion of the Order of the Bath (CB) in the 2020 New Year Honours "for services to Government Finances."

Government offices
Preceded by Sir Stephen Lovegrove	Permanent Secretary of the Ministry of Defence; 2021–present	Succeeded by incumbent
