= Roy Denman =

English civil servant and diplomat

Sir George Roy Denman, KCB, CMG (12 June 1924 – 4 April 2006), commonly known as Roy Denman, was an English civil servant and diplomat. Educated at St John's College, Cambridge, Denman entered the civil service in 1948; as the Second Permanent Secretary of the Cabinet Office from 1975 to 1977, he had responsibility for European issues. He joined the European Commission in 1977 as Director-General for External Affairs, serving until 1982; he was then Ambassador and Head of the European Communities Delegation in Washington from 1982 to 1989.

Government offices
| Preceded by Sir Patrick Nairne | Second Permanent Secretary at the Cabinet Office and Head of the European Secretariat; 1975–1977 | Succeeded by Michael Franklin (as Deputy Secretary, Cabinet Office and Head of the European Secretariat) |
