= Brian Bender =

British civil servant (1949–2021)

Brian Geoffrey Bender
- Born: 25 February 1949
- Died: 4 November 2021 (aged 72)
- Occupation: Civil servant

Sir Brian Geoffrey Bender KCB (25 February 1949 – 4 November 2021) was a British civil servant, who served as the Permanent Secretary of three departments, two of which were re-organised whilst he was at their helm.

Educated at Greenford Grammar School and then Imperial where he received his PhD, Bender joined the civil service in 1973 into DTI. After serving as the private secretary to the Secretary of State for Trade in 1976–1977, he worked in international trade issues including two stints at UKREP, from 1977 to 1982 on international steel issues and again in a more senior post responsible for all industry, for 1987–1989, returning to London to be promoted to Under Secretary to serve as deputy head of the European Secretariat in the Cabinet Office in 1990. Having returned briefly to DTI to lead the regional development directorate in 1993, in 1994 Bender was promoted to Deputy Secretary, heading the European Secretariat.

Promoted to permanent secretary five years later, Bender was first the Permanent Secretary of the Cabinet Office from 1999 until 2000, then he was appointed to head the Ministry of Agriculture, Fisheries and Food in May 2000, replacing Sir Richard Packer. MAFF was renamed and expanded to form the Department for Environment, Food and Rural Affairs in 2001, which he led until 2005, being replaced by Dame Helen Ghosh.

Sir Brian then took over from Sir Robin Young as the head of the Department of Trade and Industry. The DTI was itself reformed into the Department for Business, Enterprise and Regulatory Reform, which he led until his mandatory retirement from the civil service aged 60 in 2009, handing over briefly to Sir Simon Fraser.

After his retirement, Sir Brian became chairman of the London Metal Exchange in April 2010, and of Water UK since 2015. Sir Brian was a governor of Dulwich College since 2009, a trustee of Lloyd's Register Foundation from 2013, and a non-executive Director of Pool Re and of the Financial Reporting Council each from 2014.

Bender was appointed twice to the Order of the Bath; originally, a Companion (CB), and later as a Knight Commander (KCB) in the 2003 Birthday Honours.

He died on 4 November 2021, at the age of 72.

== Offices held ==
Government offices
Preceded by Sir Robin Mountfield	Permanent Secretary at the Cabinet Office; 1999–2000	Succeeded by Dame Mavis McDonald
Preceded by Sir Richard Packer	Permanent Secretary of the Ministry of Agriculture, Fisheries and Food; 2000–2001	Succeeded by Himself; As Perm Sec, Department for Environment, Food and Rural Affairs
Preceded by Himself; As Perm Sec, Ministry of Agriculture, Fisheries and Food	Permanent Secretary of the Department for Environment, Food and Rural Affairs; 2001–2005	Succeeded by Dame Helen Ghosh
Preceded by Sir Robin Young	Permanent Secretary of the Department of Trade and Industry; 2005–2007	Succeeded by Himself; As Perm Sec, Department for Business, Enterprise and Regulatory Reform
Preceded by Himself; As Perm Sec, Department of Trade and Industry	Permanent Secretary of the Department for Business, Enterprise and Regulatory Reform; 2007–2009	Succeeded by Simon Fraser
