= Michael Franklin (civil servant) =

English civil servant (1927–2019)

Sir Michael David Milroy Franklin, KCB, CMG (24 August 1927 – 7 June 2019) was an English civil servant. Educated at Taunton School and Peterhouse, Cambridge, Franklin entered the civil service in 1950; after four years in the European Commission's Directorate-General for Agriculture, he was head of the European Secretariat at the Cabinet Office from 1977 to 1981, Permanent Secretary of the Department of Trade from 1982 to 1983, and Permanent Secretary of the Ministry of Agriculture, Fisheries and Food from 1983 to 1987.

Government offices
Preceded by Sir Roy Denman	Head of the European Secretariat; 1977–1981	Succeeded by David Hancock
Preceded by Sir Brian Hayes	Permanent Secretary of the Ministry of Agriculture, Fisheries and Food; 1983–1987	Succeeded by Sir Derek Andrews
