= Derek Andrews (disambiguation) =

Derek Andrews may refer to:

- Derek Andrews (1933–2016), English civil servant
- Derek Andrews (footballer) (born 1934), English footballer, see List of Rochdale A.F.C. players (25–99 appearances)
