= Stephen Lovegrove =

British civil servant

Sir Stephen Lovegrove GCMG KCB
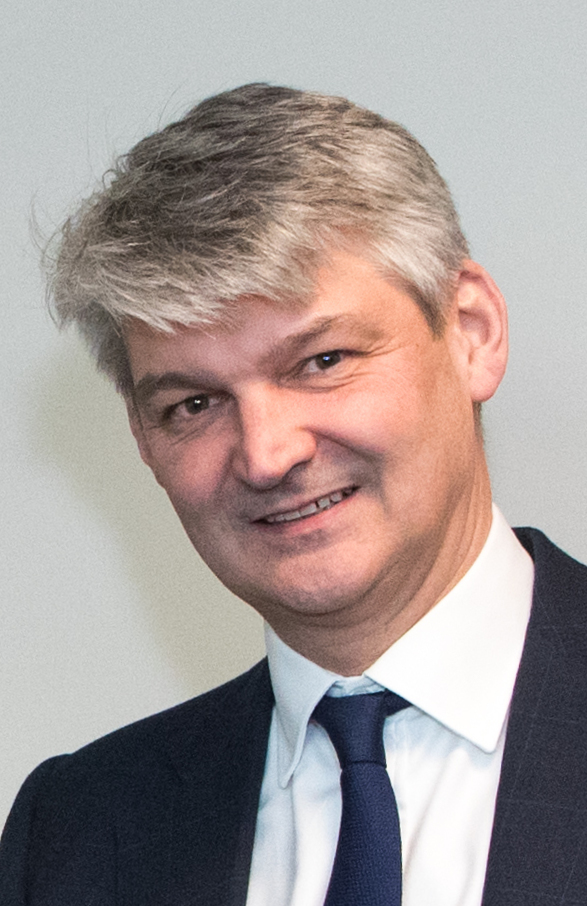
- Lovegrove in 2018

United Kingdom National Security Adviser
- In office 24 March 2021 – 14 September 2022
- Prime Minister: Boris Johnson; Liz Truss
- Preceded by: David Quarrey (acting)
- Succeeded by: Sir Tim Barrow

Permanent Under-Secretary of State for Defence
- In office April 2016 – March 2021
- Sec. of State: Sir Michael Fallon; Gavin Williamson; Penny Mordaunt; Ben Wallace
- Preceded by: Jon Thompson
- Succeeded by: David Williams

Permanent Under-Secretary of State for Energy and Climate Change
- In office 4 February 2013 – March 2016
- Prime Minister: David Cameron
- Sec. of State: Ed Davey; Amber Rudd
- Preceded by: Moira Wallace

Personal details
- Born: Stephen Augustus Lovegrove; 30 November 1966 (age 59)
- Spouse: Kate Brooke
- Education: Corpus Christi College, Oxford

Sir Stephen Augustus Lovegrove GCMG KCB (born November 1966) is a British civil servant who was the UK National Security Adviser from March 2021 to September 2022. He led the Shareholder Executive from 2007 to 2013, and then had permanent secretary roles at the Department of Energy and Climate Change and the Ministry of Defence.

== Early life ==
Lovegrove was born in 1966, the second child of John and Zenia Stewart Lovegrove. His father was a Warwickshire industrialist and entrepreneur. Lovegrove was educated at Warwick School and at Corpus Christi College, Oxford, where he was awarded a first class degree in English in 1989.

== Career ==
Between 1990 and 1994 Lovegrove worked for Hydra Associates, a strategic media consultancy. In 1995, he joined Deutsche Morgan Grenfell (subsequently Deutsche Bank), where he remained until 2004 and became head of the European media team.

In April 2004, he joined the Shareholder Executive, becoming acting Chief Executive in June 2007 and Chief Executive in April 2008. In that capacity, he was also appointed to the Board of the London Organising Committee of the Olympic Games and Paralympic Games and acted as chairman of (the no longer trading) British Nuclear Fuels Ltd.

He was appointed as Permanent Secretary of the Department of Energy and Climate Change with effect from 4 February 2013. In March 2016, after three years in that post, the Government announced his appointment as Permanent Secretary of the Ministry of Defence.

Since February 2016 he has also served as a non-executive director of Grosvenor Britain & Ireland, one of the principal operating companies of the Grosvenor Group.

In January 2021 it was announced that Lovegrove would become National Security Adviser at the end of March 2021. The announcement came as David Frost was pulled out from assuming the role, seven months after being appointed. Lovegrove held the role until 14 September 2022.

Lovegrove has been criticised by Conservatives including Sir Jacob Rees-Mogg for endorsing Black Lives Matter, which Lovegrove claims is not a political organisation which renders the accusation more significant. Lovegrove signed off all official communication with 'black lives matter'

== Honours and awards ==
Lovegrove was appointed Companion of the Order of the Bath (CB) in the 2013 New Year Honours and Knight Commander of the Order of the Bath (KCB) in the 2019 Birthday Honours. He is an Honorary Fellow of Corpus Christi College, Oxford. He was appointed Knight Grand Cross of the Order of St Michael and St George (GCMG) in the 2024 New Year Honours for services to national security.

Country	Date	Appointment	Ribbon	Post-nominal letters	Notes
United Kingdom	28 December 2012	Companion of the Order of the Bath		CB	Promoted to KCB in 2019
United Kingdom	8 June 2019	Knight Commander of the Order of the Bath		KCB	
United Kingdom	29 December 2023	Knight Grand Cross of the Order of St Michael and St George		GCMG	

== Personal life ==
In 1997, Lovegrove married the screenwriter Kate Brooke. They have two daughters and live in London.

== Sources ==
- Who's Who (2009 edition)
- Shareholder Executive website, archived in 2011
- L.O.C.O.G. website, archived in 2011

Government offices
Preceded by Moira Wallace	Permanent Secretary of the Department of Energy and Climate Change; 2013–2016	Department abolished
Preceded by Sir Jon Thompson	Permanent Secretary of the Ministry of Defence; 2016–2021	Succeeded by David Williams
