= William Pile =

William Pile may refer to:

- William Pile (shipbuilder) (1822–1873), British shipbuilder
- William A. Pile (1829–1889), American politician and minister from Missouri
- William Pile (pastoralist) (1840–1916), owner of Polia Station, New South Wales
- Sir William Pile (civil servant) (1919–1997), British civil servant
