= Battishill =

Battishill is a surname. Notable people with the surname include:

- Jonathan Battishill (1738–1801), English composer, keyboard player, and concert tenor
- Sir Anthony Battishill (born 1937), Chairman of the Board of Inland Revenue (UK), see 1997 New Year Honours
