= Sarah Munby =

British civil servant

Sarah Munby CB
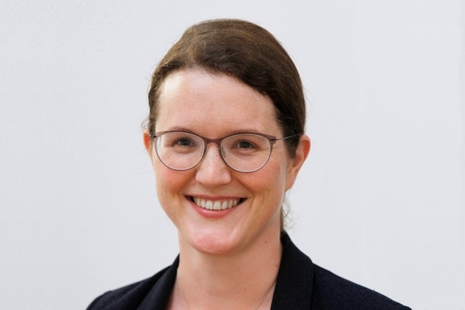

Permanent Secretary of the Department for Science, Innovation and Technology
- In office 7 February 2023 – July 2025
- Prime Minister: Rishi Sunak; Keir Starmer
- Minister: Michelle Donelan; Chloe Smith; Michelle Donelan; Peter Kyle
- Preceded by: Office established (Note: Herself as Permanent Secretary of the Department for Business, Energy and Industrial Strategy.)
- Succeeded by: Emran Mian

Permanent Secretary of the Department for Business, Energy and Industrial Strategy
- In office 20 July 2020 – 7 February 2023
- Prime Minister: Boris Johnson; Liz Truss; Rishi Sunak
- Minister: Alok Sharma; Kwasi Kwarteng; Jacob Rees-Mogg; Grant Shapps
- Preceded by: Sam Beckett (Note: As Acting Permanent Secretary.)
- Succeeded by: Gareth Davies (DBT); Jeremy Pocklington (DESNZ); Herself (DSIT)

Personal details
- Born: May 1982 (age 44)
- Occupation: Civil servant

Sarah Ann Munby CB (born 1982) is a British civil servant who served as the Permanent Secretary of the Department for Science, Innovation and Technology from February 2023 to July 2025. She was previously the Permanent Secretary of the Department for Business, Energy and Industrial Strategy from July 2020 to February 2023.

== Early life ==
Munby was born in May 1982. As a schoolgirl, at James Allen’s Girls’ School, she was a member of the runner-up team in the 2000 World Schools Debating Championships held in Pittsburgh, USA.

Munby has a PPE degree from Oxford and a Master's degree in Economics from the LSE.

== Career ==
Munby started her career working as a civil servant at the Department for Environment, Food and Rural Affairs, as an economist. She later worked for the management consultancy McKinsey & Company for fifteen years, where she "led the company's strategy and corporate finance practice in the UK and Ireland". She joined the Department for Business, Energy and Industrial Strategy (BEIS) in July 2019 as director general for business sectors. The permanent secretary at BEIS, Alex Chisholm, became chief operating officer of the civil service in April 2020. Munby replaced Sam Beckett, who served as acting permanent secretary at BEIS, as permanent secretary in July 2020.

In February 2023, Munby's department was split into three and she became Permanent Secretary of the newly-established Department for Science, Innovation and Technology.

In March 2024, Munby became embroiled in the scandal of Michelle Donelan using government funds to settle a libel claim made against her.

In April 2024, Munby was implicated by Henry Staunton (former Chair of Post Office Limited) in the Post Office scandal for applying pressure on the CEO of Post Office to cut costs, including on Horizon accounting system's replacement and compensation for sub postmasters innocent of wrongdoing. However, in Volume 1 of the Post Office Horizon IT Inquiry's final report Sir Wyn Williams said "If, as Mr Staunton would have me conclude, Ms Munby had even hinted at it being the desire of Government that the Post Office should "go slow" on compensation, either at that time, or at some future time in the lead up to a general election, I would have expected that to have been clearly recorded in the notes of the meeting. His suggestion in his oral evidence that his notes were never intended to record all that was said was, I fear, unconvincing."

Munby was appointed to the University of Manchester Board of Governors in August 2025.

She was appointed Companion of the Order of the Bath (CB) in the 2026 Birthday Honours for public service.

== Notes ==
Government offices
Preceded by Sam Beckett; Acting	Permanent Secretary of the Department for Business, Energy and Industrial Strategy; 2020–2023	Succeeded by Gareth Davies as Permanent Secretary of the Department for Business and Trade
Preceded by Sam Beckett; Acting	Permanent Secretary of the Department for Business, Energy and Industrial Strategy; 2020–2023	Succeeded by Jeremy Pocklington as Permanent Secretary of the Department for Energy Security and Net Zero
Preceded by Sam Beckett; Acting	Permanent Secretary of the Department for Business, Energy and Industrial Strategy; 2020–2023	Succeeded by Herself as Permanent Secretary of the Department for Science, Innovation and Technology
Preceded by Herself as Permanent Secretary of the Department for Business, Energy and Industrial Strategy	Permanent Secretary of the Department for Science, Innovation and Technology; 2023–2025	Succeeded by Emran Mian
