= Lawrence Airey =

Sir Lawrence Airey, KCB (10 March 1926 – 21 June 2001) was a British civil servant.

Born on 10 March 1926, Airey attended Newcastle Royal Grammar School, before serving in the Second World War; after demobilisation, he studied at Peterhouse, Cambridge. The first seven years of his time in the civil service were spent analysing mortality statistics. In the 1960s, he was based at HM Treasury, where he worked on the nationalised industries desk. Airey was appointed Second Permanent Secretary responsible for the domestic economy sector at the Treasury in 1977, where he remained until he was appointed chairman of the Board of Inland Revenue in 1980. While there, he oversaw the simplification of tax forms and the computerisation of the Pay as You Earn (PAYE) income tax system. He retired in 1986.

Airey was appointed a Companion of the Order of the Bath (CB) in the 1976 Birthday Honours and promoted to Knight Commander (KCB) in the 1978 Birthday Honours. He died on 21 June 2001.

Government offices
Preceded by Alan Lord	Second Permanent Secretary (Domestic Economy), HM Treasury; 1977–1980	Succeeded by Sir William Ryrie
Preceded by Sir William Pile	Chairman, Board of Inland Revenue; 1980–1986	Succeeded by Sir Anthony Battishill
