= Richard Packer (civil servant) =

British civil servant

Sir Richard John Packer, KCB, (born 18 August 1944) is a former British civil servant. He was Permanent Secretary at Ministry of Agriculture, Fisheries and Food (MAFF) from 1993 until 2000. He was knighted (KCB) in 2000.

Sir Richard Packer was educated at City of London School and initially trained as a scientist at the Victoria University of Manchester. He had a distinguished civil service career being the youngest Permanent Secretary ever appointed to the Ministry of Agriculture, Fisheries and Food, a post he held for seven years until 2000. His earlier career centred on the agricultural and fishing policies of the European Union.

In 2006 his book The Politics of BSE was published by Palgrave. He is a non-executive director of Arla, the largest UK dairy company. He is married to Baroness Neville-Rolfe, with whom he has four sons.

Government offices
Preceded by Sir Derek Andrews	Permanent Secretary of the Ministry of Agriculture, Fisheries and Food; 1993–2000	Succeeded by Sir Brian Bender
