= UK Regulators Network =

British regulators group

The UK Regulators Network (UKRN) is an association of 15 regulators from the United Kingdom's utility, financial and transport sectors. The network aims to secure "greater efficiency and improved outcomes for consumers, businesses, and the economy, exploring cross-cutting issues and building better ways of working".

== Members ==
The members of the UKRN are listed below.

- The Civil Aviation Authority (CAA)
- The Financial Conduct Authority (FCA)
- The Financial Reporting Council (FRC)
- The Information Commissioner's Office (ICO)
- The Legal Services Board (LSB)
- The Northern Ireland Authority for Utility Regulation (UR)
- The Office of Gas & Electricity Markets (OfGEM)
- The Office of Communications (Ofcom)
- The Office of Rail & Road (ORR)
- The Payment Systems Regulator (PSR)
- The Pensions Regulator (TPR)
- The Regulator of Social Housing (RSH)
- The Single Source Regulations Office (SSRO)
- The Water Services Regulation Authority (Ofwat)
- The Water Industry Commission for Scotland (WICS), since 23 April 2026.

== Personnel ==
The chief executive of the UKRN (February 2021) is Jonathan Brearley.
