= Benedict Brogan =

British journalist

- Education: Lycée Rochambeau; University of Massachusetts Amherst; University of Cambridge
- Occupations: Journalist, columnist, public relations officer
- Employer: Lloyds Banking Group
- Predecessor: Tony Gallagher
- Successor: Allister Heath
- Board member of: Director public affairs, Lloyds Banking Group
- Spouse: Melanie Dawes
- Children: 1

Benedict Brogan is a British former journalist, formerly deputy editor and chief political commentator of The Daily Telegraph. In December 2014, six months after resigning his posts at The Telegraph, Brogan was appointed group director of public affairs at Lloyds Banking Group.

== Early life and education ==
Brogan was born to an English father and a French mother, and was brought up in Washington, D.C. He attended the Lycée Rochambeau, a French international school in the Washington suburb of Bethesda, Maryland. He went on to study history at the University of Massachusetts Amherst and then gained a master's degree in International Relations at the University of Cambridge.

== Career ==
After graduating from Cambridge, Brogan worked at The Herald as a reporter in their Glasgow office. He worked in a wide range of roles at the Herald, becoming their Political Correspondent based in the House of Commons in London in 1992. Brogan then worked for the Daily Mail, moved to The Daily Telegraph in 2000, moved again to the Daily Mail as Political Editor in May 2005, and finally, in February 2009, re-joined the Telegraph as Assistant Editor and chief political commentator.

Media commentator Iain Dale called the move "a real coup for the Telegraph and a big blow to the Mail. Brogan has proved himself to be one of the best political reporters in the business but in the last year or two he has also developed into a fine commentator", and noted that The Daily Telegraph, which at that point had an anti-David Cameron set of columnists, may have been trying to redress the balance.

Brogan wrote the "Morning Briefing" for the Telegraph, a preview of the day ahead's political events, akin to Mike Allen's Playbook. Total Politics referred to it as "an important resource for fellow journalists and political junkies alike".

Brogan maintained a blog on the Telegraph website; it billed itself as "news, gossip, analysis, occasional insight into politics, and more". The Independent noted in 2008 that Brogan "only turned his hand to blogging in 2006, but was an almost instant success and can now expect between 3,000 and 5,000 hits on a busy day. He describes his blog as the place where 'I empty my notebook', sharing snippets of news, observations and asides that might not otherwise find a place in his newspaper. He has won admirers across the political spectrum."

In mid-June 2014, Brogan left his posts at The Telegraph. In December 2014, Brogan was appointed group director of public affairs at Lloyds Banking Group.

== Personal life ==
Brogan is married to Dame Melanie Dawes and together they have a daughter.

Media offices
Preceded by David Hughes	Political Editor of the Daily Mail; 2005–2009	Succeeded by James Chapman
Preceded by Tony Gallagher	Deputy Editor of The Daily Telegraph; 2009–2014	Succeeded by Allister Heath
