= Sue Street =

British civil servant

Dame Sue Street DCB

Permanent Secretary for Department for Culture, Media & Sport
- In office 2001–2006
- Secretary of State: Tessa Jowell
- Preceded by: Sir Robin Young
- Succeeded by: Sir Jonathan Stephens

Personal details
- Born: 11 August 1949 (age 77)
- Education: University of St Andrews

Dame Susan Ruth Street, DCB (née Galeski; born 11 August 1949) is a former Permanent Secretary for the Department for Culture, Media and Sport (DCMS), serving from 2001 to 2006. She was responsible for the overall strategy, delivery and expenditure for the whole department. This included major projects like the winning bid for the London 2012 Olympic Games and the renewal of the BBC Charter.

== Career ==
After graduating from the University of St Andrews with a degree in philosophy, Street joined the British Council. She then joined the civil service as an administration trainee at the Home Office in 1974.

From 2007 to 2012, Street was a Strategic Adviser to Deloitte and a member of its public sector council. Prior to that she held posts in the areas of security and Criminal Justice policy serving as a Director General in the Home Office in 1999 and leading a study of the Youth Justice Board which reported in early 2010. She has held a number of pro-bono roles including the Whitehall and Industry Group, a Senior Management Consultant at PricewaterhouseCoopers, board member of the National School of Government and a governor of South Hampstead High School. Sue served on the main board of HMRC from 2008 to 2010.

She served as non-executive director of the Ministry of Justice, trustee of the Royal Opera House, Governor of the Royal Ballet, BUPA associate and associate fellow of the Institute for Government. In 2014, she was appointed non-executive director of Adlens, developer and manufacturer of variable focus eyewear. She is currently chair of the board of Rambert.

== Personal life ==
Sue Street is married with two adult children.

She was appointed a Dame Commander of the Order of the Bath (DCB) in the 2005 Birthday Honours.

Government offices
Preceded by Sir Robin Young	Permanent Secretary of the Department for Culture, Media and Sport; 2006–2013	Succeeded by Sir Jonathan Stephens
