= Melanie Dawes =

British economist and civil servant

Dame Melanie Dawes DCB
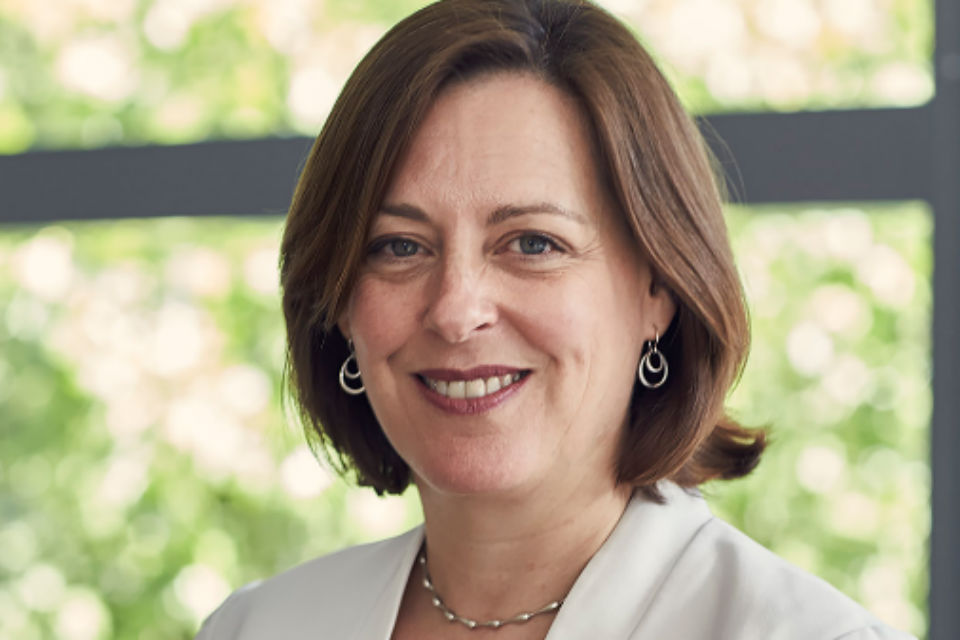

Chief Executive of the Office of Communications
- Incumbent
- Assumed office 12 February 2020
- Prime Minister: Boris Johnson; Liz Truss; Rishi Sunak; Keir Starmer; Andy Burnham
- Preceded by: Sharon White

Personal details
- Born: Melanie Henrietta Dawes; 9 March 1966 (age 60)
- Spouse: Benedict Brogan (m. 1992)
- Children: 1 daughter
- Education: New College, Oxford; Birkbeck, University of London
- Awards: Dame Commander of the Order of the Bath (2020)

Dame Melanie Henrietta Dawes DCB (born 9 March 1966) is a British economist and administrator. In February 2020 she was appointed Chief Executive of Ofcom. She was previously the Permanent Secretary of the Ministry of Housing, Communities and Local Government, and before that worked at HM Treasury, HM Revenue and Customs, and in the Cabinet Office. She is a Trustee of the Patchwork Foundation, founded by Harris Bokhari.

== Early life and education ==
Dawes was born on 9 March 1966. She was educated at Malvern Girls' College, then an all-girls private school in Malvern, Worcestershire. She studied at New College, Oxford, graduating with a Bachelor of Arts (BA) degree. She then undertook postgraduate studies in economics at Birkbeck College, London, graduating with a Master of Science (MSc) degree.

== Career ==
Dawes joined the Civil Service in 1989. After two years at the Department for Transport, she spent 15 years at HM Treasury, ending her time there in the role of Europe Director from 2002 to 2006. Then, from 2006 to 2011, she worked at HM Revenue and Customs (HMRC). She was Director General for Business Tax at HMRC from November 2007, replacing Dave Hartnett. From October 2011 to 2015, she was Director General of the Economic and Domestic Secretariat in the Cabinet Office.

On 1 March 2015 Dawes was appointed as the Permanent Secretary of the Department for Communities and Local Government, succeeding Sir Bob Kerslake. She was the first permanent secretary to be appointed under a new scheme in which the Prime Minister has the final say in the recruitment process; the PM now chooses from a list created by the Civil Service Commissioners, rather than only having a veto over the Commissioners' preferred candidate. In 2015 Dawes was paid a salary of between £160,000 and £164,999 pa by DCLG, making her one of the 328 most highly paid people in the British public sector. On 12 February 2020, Dawes was named as the new Chief Executive of broadcasting, telecoms and postal services regulator Ofcom. In an October 2025 Financial Times profile of Dawes, it was reported that Ofcom under Dawes would require major social media and technology platforms to demonstrate that their recommendation algorithms prevent children from being shown harmful content, and stated that the regulator may order algorithmic audits and enforcement action under the Online Safety Act.

=== Other work ===
Dawes was Chair of the Alcohol Recovery Project from 2003 to 2005. She was a Member of the Council of Which? between 2011 and 2015. She was the Civil Service Gender Champion from 2015 to 2019, when she was appointed as the overall Civil Service Diversity and Inclusion Champion. She was a judge for the 2015 Civil Service Diversity and Inclusion Awards. Dawes is a trustee of the Patchwork Foundation.

== Personal life ==
In 1992, Dawes married Benedict Brogan. Together they have a daughter.

== Honours ==
Dawes was appointed Companion of the Order of the Bath (CB) in the 2013 Birthday Honours for "services to the Civil Service in the field of Economic Policy" and promoted to Dame Commander of the Order of the Bath (DCB) in the 2020 New Year Honours for public service.

== Offices held ==
Government offices
Preceded by Dave Hartnett as Director-General, Business & Compliance Strategy	Director General, Business Tax; HM Revenue & Customs; 2007–2011	Succeeded by Mike Norgrove
Preceded by Chris Wormald	Director-General, Economic and Domestic Secretariat, Cabinet Office; 2011–2015	Succeeded by Jonathan Slater
Preceded by Sir Bob Kerslake	Permanent Secretary of the Ministry for Housing, Communities and Local Government; 2015–2020	Succeeded by Jeremy Pocklington
Preceded by Jonathan Oxley (interim)	Chief Executive of Ofcom; 2020–	Incumbent
