= John Caines =

British civil servant (born 1933)

Sir John Caines, KCB (born 13 January 1933) is a retired English civil servant. Educated at Westminster School and Christ Church, Oxford, he entered the civil service in 1957 as an official in the Ministry of Supply. He subsequently served in the Ministry of Aviation, the Board of Trade and its successors, and the Central Policy Review Staff. He was deputy secretary in the Department of Trade and Industry from 1983 to 1987. From 1987 to 1989, he was Permanent Secretary of the Overseas Development Administration at the Foreign and Commonwealth Office. He was Permanent Secretary of the Department of Education and Science from 1989 to 1992 and of its successor, the Department for Education, from 1992 to 1993.

Government offices
Preceded by Sir David Hancock	Permanent Secretary of the Department for Education and Science; 1989–1992	Succeeded by himself as Permanent Secretary, Department for Education
Preceded by himself as Permanent Secretary, Department for Education and Science	Permanent Secretary of the Department for Education; 1992–1993	Succeeded by Sir Geoffrey Holland
