= Jane Ramsey, Baroness Ramsey of Wall Heath =

British politician

The Right Honourable The Baroness Ramsey of Wall Heath
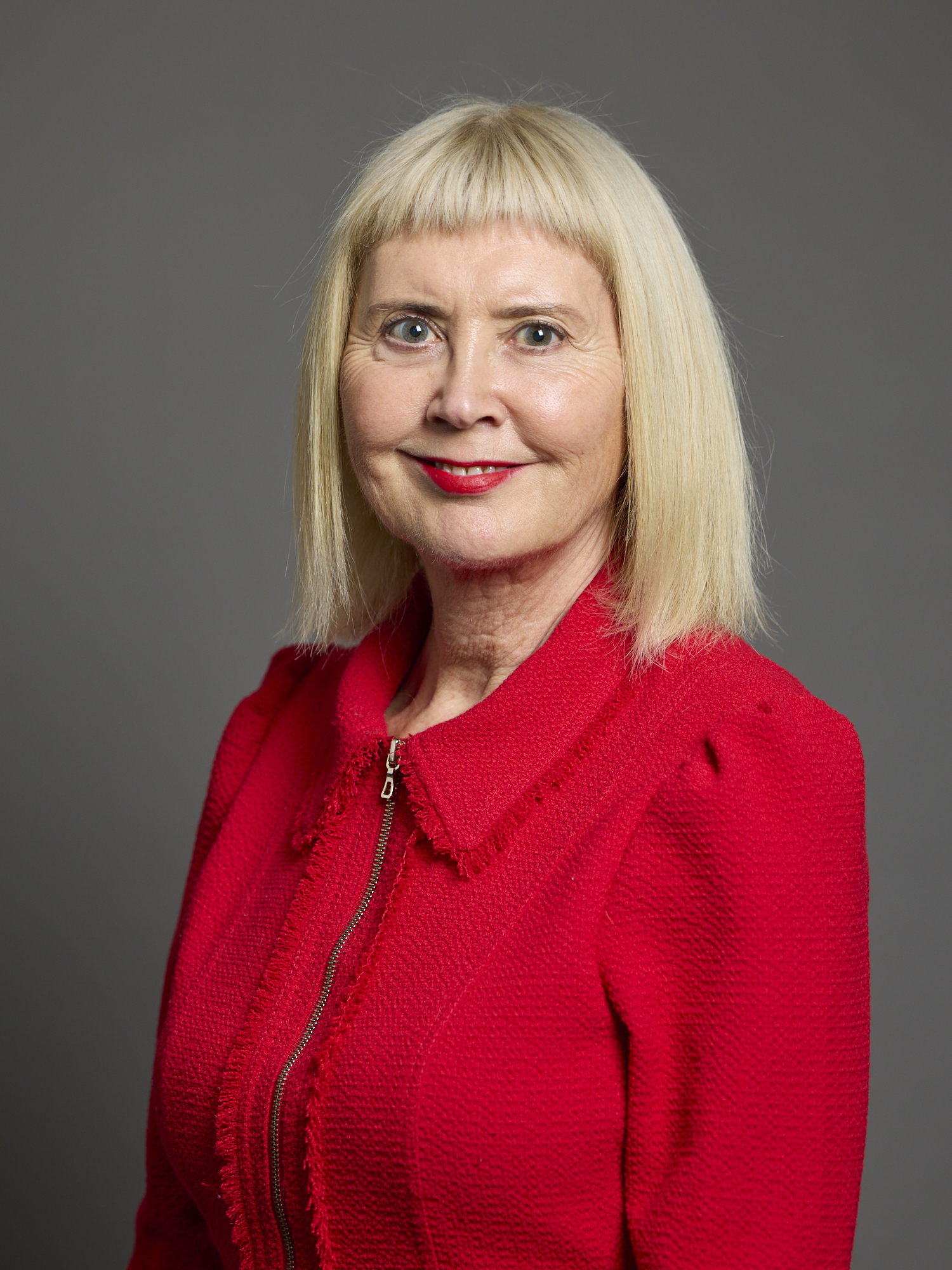
- Official portrait, 2025

Baroness-in-Waiting Government Whip
- Incumbent
- Assumed office 12 June 2026
- Prime Minister: Keir Starmer; Andy Burnham
- Preceded by: Lord Lemos

Member of the House of Lords
- Lord Temporal
- Life peerage 13 March 2024

Personal details
- Born: Jane Ramsey; September 1960
- Party: Labour
- Spouse: Jonathan Slater (m. 2001)
- Children: 3
- Occupation: Health adviser

Jane Ramsey, Baroness Ramsey of Wall Heath (born September 1960), is a British politician and health adviser. She chairs the board of trustees of the national charity Young Epilepsy, and was a senior adviser on standards and ethics to the Labour Party and a member of the Committee on Standards in Public Life. Ramsey has been a member of the House of Lords since 2024.

== Career ==
Originally training as a barrister, Ramsey was the chair of Cambridge University Hospitals NHS Foundation Trust from 2012 to 2016, and previously the vice chair of University College London Hospitals. She has also served on the council of the Royal Pharmaceutical Society and the Department of Health's Audit and Risk Committee, chaired a local housing association, and served as head of law for two London boroughs. She has chaired the board of trustees of the national epilepsy charity Young Epilepsy since October 2016.

From 2016 to 2020, Ramsey was an independent member of the Committee on Standards in Public Life. Following the publication in 2020 of a report by the Equality and Human Rights Commission into antisemitism in the Labour Party, she was appointed to establish a new independent complaints process for the party.

Ramsey was nominated for a life peerage by Labour leader Sir Keir Starmer and was created Baroness Ramsey of Wall Heath, of Dulwich in the London Borough of Southwark, on 13 March 2024. She was introduced to the House of Lords on 19 March. From 30 January 2025 to 12 June 2026 she was chair of the Delegated Powers and Regulatory Reform Select Committee. Baroness Ramsey was appointed to the Starmer ministry Baroness in Waiting (Government Whip) on 12 June 2026.

== Personal life ==
In 2001, Ramsey married Jonathan Slater, a British civil servant who was the permanent secretary of the Department for Education from 2016 to 2020. They have two sons and one daughter.

She has written about health and education issues relating to autism and epilepsy, as well as in support of transgender rights in the United Kingdom and LGBT inclusivity in schools.
