= Jonathan Stephens =

British civil servant

Sir Jonathan Stephens KCB
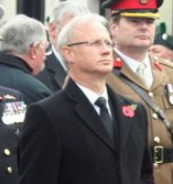
- Stephens in 2018

Permanent Secretary at the Northern Ireland Office
- In office 2014–2020
- Prime Minister: David Cameron
- Preceded by: Julian King
- Succeeded by: Madeleine Alessandri

Permanent Secretary at the Department for Culture, Media and Sport
- In office 2006–2013
- Preceded by: Dame Sue Street
- Succeeded by: Dame Sue Owen

Personal details
- Born: Jonathan Andrew de Sievrac Stephens; 8 February 1960 (age 66) Bromley, Kent, England
- Education: Christ Church, Oxford; BA, 1982

Sir Jonathan Andrew de Sievrac Stephens, KCB (born 8 February 1960) is a retired British civil servant who was Permanent Secretary at the Northern Ireland Office between 2014 and 2020, and the Permanent Secretary of the Department for Culture, Media and Sport between 2006 and 2013. On his retirement, he was replaced as Permanent Secretary of the Northern Ireland Office by Madeleine Alessandri.

== Personal life ==
Stephens was born in 1960 in Bromley, Kent, the son of Prescot and Peggy (née Pike) Stephens. He was educated at Sevenoaks School, and Christ Church, Oxford, where he earned a Bachelor of Arts degree in Philosophy, Politics and Economics. He is married with two adult children.

== Career ==
Stephens joined the Civil Service in the Northern Ireland Office in 1983, being promoted through various grades before transferring to the Cabinet Office as Director of Modernising Public Service in 2000. In 2001, he was seconded to HM Treasury where he rose to be managing director of Public Services 2004–06, replacing Sir Nicholas Macpherson.

In 2006, Stephens was appointed Permanent Secretary of DCMS to replace Dame Sue Street on her retirement. During his time at the DCMS, he oversaw the organisation of major events, including 2012 Olympic Games and 2012 Paralympic Games in London, and the Diamond Jubilee of Elizabeth II.

From September 2013 to May 2014, Stephens worked as a reviewer at HM Treasury, and joined the Northern Ireland Office as Permanent Secretary in June 2014. As of 2015, Stephens was paid a salary of between £155,000 and £159,999 by the NIO, making him one of the 328 most highly paid people in the British public sector at that time.

== Public Accounts Committee ==
On 26 April 2012, Stephens appeared before the Public Accounts Committee at the House of Commons, where he was asked 10 times by Margaret Hodge MP about whether he knew that Adam Smith, a special adviser to Culture Secretary Jeremy Hunt, was acting as a liaison between his department and media owner Rupert Murdoch. Stephens refused to disclose any information about his knowledge or authorisation of the role.

== Honours ==
Stephens was appointed Knight Commander of the Order of the Bath in the 2013 Birthday Honours for public service, especially to the Olympic Games in London.

== Offices held ==
Government offices
Preceded by Sir Nicholas Macpherson	Managing Director, Public Services; HM Treasury; 2004–2006	Succeeded by John Kingman
Preceded by Dame Sue Street	Permanent Secretary of the Department for Culture, Media and Sport; 2006–2013	Succeeded by Dame Sue Owen
Preceded by Julian King as Director-General, Northern Ireland Office	Permanent Secretary of the Northern Ireland; Office; 2014–2020	Succeeded by Madeleine Alessandri
