= James Arnot Hamilton =

British aircraft designer

Sir James Hamilton KCB MBE
- Born: 2 May 1923
- Died: 24 May 2012 (aged 89)
- Occupation: Aircraft designer
- Known for: Concorde; SEPECAT Jaguar

Sir James Arnot Hamilton KCB MBE (2 May 1923 – 24 May 2012) was a British aircraft designer who helped design Concorde and the SEPECAT Jaguar. He also served as the permanent secretary of the Department for Education. Specialising in wing design, he was largely responsible for Concorde's distinctive wing.

== Biography ==
James Hamilton was born on 2 May 1923 in Midlothian. He attended Lasswade Secondary School and Penicuik High School, before going on to receive a degree in civil engineering from the University of Edinburgh. He served in the Marine Aircraft Experimental Establishment from 1943 to 1952, where he worked on anti-submarine weaponry and seaplanes, rising to head of flight research. He then worked at the Royal Aircraft Establishment, becoming head of the projects division in 1964 before budget reductions led to his projects being stopped.

In 1965, Hamilton took control of the project to build the SEPECAT Jaguar. Launched in 1972, with various air forces, the Jaguar was used in numerous conflicts and military operations in Mauritania, Chad, Iraq, Bosnia, and Pakistan, as well as providing a ready nuclear delivery platform for Britain, France, and India throughout the latter half of the Cold War and beyond. In 1966, he was named head of the British portion of the Concorde project. Specialising in wing design, he was largely responsible for the plane's distinctive wing.

Though the project would not be completed until 1976, Hamilton left in 1971 to become deputy secretary for aerospace in the Department of Trade and Industry. As deputy secretary, he oversaw cancellation of the Black Arrow project and the nationalisation of Rolls-Royce's aviation engine division. In 1973, he served as Deputy Cabinet Secretary until being moved to the education department and taking control of the Department of Education and Science. He retired from government in 1983.

Hamilton served on the boards of various corporations, including Hawker Siddeley, and chaired Brown and Root UK. He was president of The Association for Science Education. Hamilton was appointed a Member of the Order of the British Empire in 1952, a Companion of the Order of the Bath in 1972 and a Knight Commander of that order in 1978.

Hamilton married Christine McKean in Glasgow in 1947, they had three children together before the marriage was dissolved in 1977. From 1995 until his death he was in a relationship with Marcia Cunningham. Hamilton died in Winchester, Hampshire on 24 May 2012.

Government offices
Preceded by Sir William Pile	Permanent Secretary of the Department for Education and Science; 1976–1983	Succeeded by Sir David Hancock
