= Patricia Moberly =

English teacher, Labour politician, and Anti-Apartheid activist (1938–2016)

Patricia Moberly JP

Chair of Guy's and St Thomas' NHS Foundation Trust
- In office 1999–2011
- Succeeded by: Sir Hugh Taylor

Lambeth London Borough Councillor
- In office 1971–1978 Serving with J. R. Medway (1971-1974), D. S. Speakman (1971-1978), and N. Turner (1974-1978)
- Leader: Charles Dryland (1971-73); David Stimpson (1973-78)
- Constituency: Prince's

Personal details
- Born: Patricia Jane Coney; 20 October 1938 Fareham, Hampshire
- Died: 2 September 2016 (aged 77)
- Party: Labour
- Other political affiliations: United National Independence Party
- Spouse: Richard Hamilton Moberly (m. 1959)
- Children: 4
- Education: University of Liverpool; King's College, London
- Profession: Teacher; local councillor; magistrate; public servant

Academic background
- Thesis: Charlotte Mary Yonge's Anglicanism: an Examination of John Keble's Influence on her Literary Development and Achievement (1985)

Academic work
- Discipline: English literature

Patricia Jane Moberly JP (née Coney; 20 October 1938 – 2 September 2016) was a British public servant, Labour politician, activist, and teacher. She is best known for her work as Chair of Guy's and St Thomas' NHS Foundation Trust between 1999 and 2011, as well as her involvement in the Anti-Apartheid Movement.

== Early life and education ==
Moberly was born on 20 October 1938 in Fareham, Hampshire, England. She was the youngest child of Captain Gerald Coney, a Royal Navy officer, and Margaret Coney (née Jelf). Due to her father's career, the family moved around a lot: she had moved home 11 times by the age of ten. She was educated at six different schools before being sent to board at Sunny Hill School, a private school. Having received a scholarship, she studied English language and literature at the University of Liverpool, graduating with a first class honours Bachelor of Arts (BA Hons) degree. One of her lecturers was Kenneth Muir, the eminent Shakespeare scholar. Her father had not wanted her to attend university, stating that she was "fit only to be a cook".

Moberly later undertook postgraduate studies at King's College London, completing her Doctor of Philosophy (PhD) degree in 1985. Her doctoral thesis concerned the work of Charlotte Mary Yonge, a 19th-century novelist with links to the Oxford Movement and the Pre-Raphaelite Brotherhood. The work was titled, "Charlotte Mary Yonge's Anglicanism: an Examination of John Keble's Influence on her Literary Development and Achievement".

== Career ==
=== Teaching career ===
In 1959, the then Patricia Coney married Richard Hamilton Moberly, a son of the philosopher and university administrator Walter Hamilton Moberly. Richard Moberly was an ordained Anglican priest and in 1963, she moved with him to Chingola, Northern Rhodesia, where he was posted as a rector. From 1964 to 1967, she taught at Chikola School, a local secondary school for black Africans. During her time in the country, that would soon become the independent Zambia, she taught at local schools and became involved in anti-racist politics. She became one of the few white women to join the United National Independence Party.

In 1967, the family returned to England and her husband was appointed Vicar of St Anselm's Church, Kennington, London in the Diocese of Southwark. She taught English at The John Roan School in Greenwich, from 1967 to 1968, and at Mary Datchelor School in Camberwell from 1968 to 1974. She then joined Pimlico School, where she was a senior teacher from 1974 to 1998 and the head of Sixth Form from 1985 to 1998.

=== Political life ===
During her time in Zambia, Moberly became opposed to racial oppression and the Apartheid of neighbouring South Africa. She joined the United National Independence Party, becoming one of its few white female members. She also hosted political exiles from South Africa, including Zanele Dlamini Mbeki, future wife of Thabo Mbeki and First Lady of South Africa (1999–2008).

Having returned to England, Moberly joined the Labour Party and was active in the Anti-Apartheid Movement. She was an elected councillor on Lambeth London Borough Council between 1971 and 1978, representing the Prince's ward. In the October 1974 General Election, she unsuccessfully stood as the Labour candidate in St Marylebone, losing to the Conservative candidate Kenneth Baker.

In the early 1970, Moberly was arrested after a demonstration outside Downing Street: the protest was against the British government's inaction over the war in Rhodesia. She had been accused of throwing a placard stating "No Peace Without Majority Rule" at a car containing the then prime minister, Ted Heath, leading to a conviction of a breach of the peace. Defended by the eminent barrister Dingle Foot, she eventually had her conviction overturned on appeal, due in part to a photograph of her under arrest published by the Morning Star, in which she was holding the placard in question.

In 2005, Moberly chaired the Friends of the London Eye group, which campaigned against the proposed rent increase that would have forced the attraction to be relocated.

=== Public service ===
Moberly became a Justice of the peace within inner London in 1976. She was a member of the Lambeth, Southwark and Lewisham Area Health Authority from 1976 to 1981, and then of the Lambeth District Health Authority from 1981 to 1990. She was a lay member of the General Medical Council from 2002 to 2011.

Moberly served as a governor of Maudsley Hospital and Bethlem Royal Hospital, two psychiatric hospitals, from 1976 to 1978. She served as a governor of the United Medical and Dental Schools of Guy's and St Thomas' Hospitals (UMDS) from 1988 to 1990. She was a non-executive director of Guy's and St Thomas' NHS Foundation Trust from 1997 until becoming its chairwomen.

From 1999 to 2011, Moberly served as Chair of Guy's and St Thomas' NHS Foundation Trust. This was arguably the post for which she was best known. When she arrived, there were clear issues with the trust: racial divisions meant that black nurses mainly worked on less prestigious wards such as elderly care, and consultant appointments were perceived as being affected Freemasonry membership. During her 12 years in charge, and having been "initially met with resistance from the predominantly white medical establishment", she strived for racial and gender diversity throughout trust. She was succeeded in the role by Sir Hugh Taylor, a retired civil servant.

Moberly's final public post was as a member of the Committee on Standards in Public Life, to which she was appointed on 17 May 2012. Due to her cancer diagnosis, she had stepped down from most of her other responsibilities, but also continued as a visitor at Brixton Prison.

== Honour ==
In November 2008, Moberly was awarded an honorary Doctor of Science (DSc) degree by the London South Bank University in recognition of her "formidable contribution to health management and medical ethics, but also to education, and throughout her career, to the cause of anti-racism".

== Personal life ==
Moberly and her husband had four children.

Patricia Moberly died from cancer on 2 September 2016, aged 77. She was survived by her husband, who died on 10 June 2022.
