= Defence and Overseas Secretariat =

UK government agency

The Defence and Overseas Secretariat is a secretariat in the United Kingdom Cabinet Office.

== Heads of the Secretariat ==
- 1994–1996: Paul Lever
- 1996–1997: Colin Budd

== See also ==
- Economic and Domestic Affairs Secretariat
- European Secretariat
- Civil Contingencies Secretariat
