= Sue Owen (civil servant) =

British civil servant and economist

Dame Sue Owen DCB
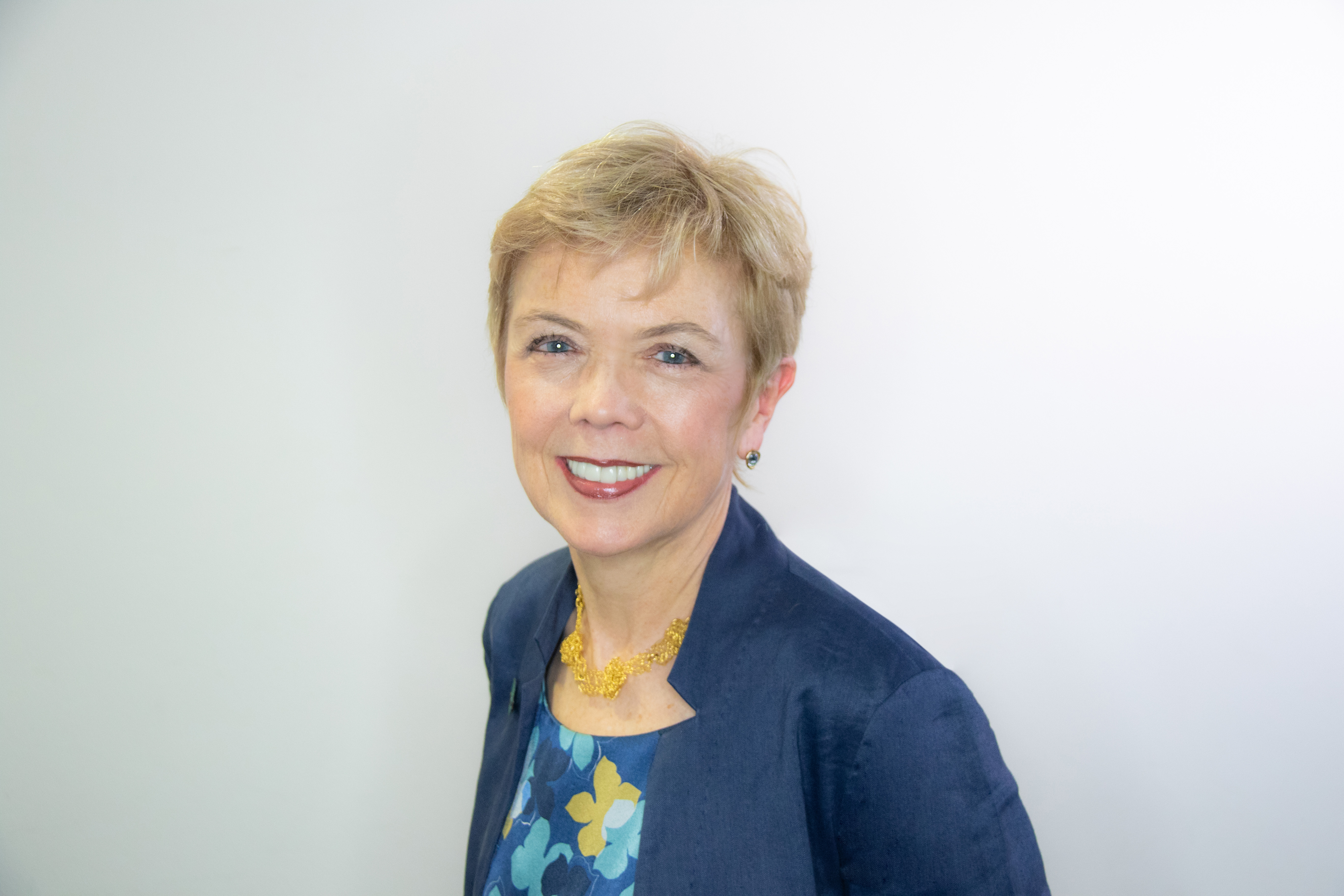

Permanent Secretary at the Department for Digital, Culture, Media and Sport
- In office 1 October 2013 – 31 March 2019
- Prime Minister: David Cameron; Theresa May
- Minister: Maria Miller; Sajid Javid; John Whittingdale; Karen Bradley; Matt Hancock; Jeremy Wright
- Preceded by: Sir Jonathan Stephens
- Succeeded by: Sarah Healey

Personal details
- Born: Susan Jane Owen; 3 June 1955 (age 71)
- Spouse: Martin Albrow (1987–present)

Dame Susan Jane Owen DCB (born 3 June 1955) is a former British civil servant, economist and former academic. She served as the Permanent Secretary for the Department for Digital, Culture, Media and Sport from October 2013 until her retirement in March 2019.

== Early life ==
She was educated at Lady Eleanor Holles School in Hampton, London. She received a degree in economics from Newnham College, Cambridge in 1976 and a MSc (Economics) at Cardiff University in Wales in 1978.

== Career ==
Owen was an academic lecturer and researcher at Cardiff University and the London School of Economics, where she studied women in the labour market from 1979 until 1988. Owen then joined HM Treasury as an economic adviser in 1989, before working on EU Co-ordination from 1995 to 1998. She was then seconded to the Number 10 Policy Unit as the economic adviser on the Work/Family Balance Policy project, followed by a four-year tour from 1999 to 2002 as the Foreign Office's Counsellor for economic affairs and head of the economics section at the British Embassy in Washington, D.C.

In 2002, Owen returned to the Treasury as Director for EMU Policy, Euro Preparations and Debt Management. She was UK Alternate Director on the EU Economic and Finance Committee. In 2006 she moved to the Department for International Development as their Director-General for Corporate Performance, before briefly serving as their acting Permanent Secretary in 2008 between Sir Suma Chakrabarti and Dame Minouche Shafik. She then left for Department for Work and Pensions as their Director-General for Welfare and Wellbeing (from 2011, for Strategy), where she served from 2009 until 2013.

In October 2013, Owen replaced Sir Jonathan Stephens as Permanent Secretary for the Department for Culture, Media and Sport (DCMS). Owen took over the department following the successful 2012 Olympics and Paralympic Games held in London, and her role as head of the DCMS department also includes ensuring a long-term legacy of those Games. As of 2015, Owen was paid a salary of between £155,000 and £159,999 by DCLG, making her one of the 328 most highly paid people in the British public sector at that time. In July 2017 the department was renamed to be the Department for Digital, Culture, Media and Sport, to reflect the increasing importance of that part of the department's work.

As Permanent Secretary, Owen oversaw civil servants in the fields of the arts, sport, tourism, creative industries and media. She worked with 45 arm's-length bodies, overseeing appointments to their boards. From 2013–15 her role also included promoting equality and diversity in society, including some matters related to the legalisation of same-sex marriage. Owen was also an ex officio member of the Arts, Media, Sport and Economy committee of the Honours Committee, which nominates people for the Queen's Birthday and New Year Honours.

In July 2014, Owen became the LGB&T (straight ally) Champion for Her Majesty's Civil Service, which is a voluntary leadership role designed to serve as a figurehead for lesbian, gay, bisexual and transgender government employees. One of her early acts was overseeing the Talent Action Plan, launched in September 2014, which aims to remove barriers that have limited LGB&T employees. Owen said the goal of the plan was to "ensure that you can succeed in the Civil Service whoever you are." Owen has also discussed the need for more gender equality in government, and that she was a strong proponent of policies and programmes to increase the number of women in power in the senior civil service. In June 2015 Owen also became the Civil Service Diversity Champion, replacing Simon Fraser.

In March 2019, it was announced that Dame Sue would be succeeded as permanent secretary by Sarah Healey. She was appointed as non-executive chair of the advisory board of the UK Debt Management Office in May 2022.

== Honours and personal life ==
Owen married Martin Albrow in 1987.

Owen was appointed a Commander of the Order of the Bath (CB) in the Queen's Birthday Honours for 2010. She was promoted to Dame Commander of the Order of the Bath (DCB) in the 2018 Queen's Birthday Honours.

== Offices held ==
Government offices
Preceded by Sir Jonathan Stephens	Permanent Secretary of the Department for Digital, Culture, Media and Sport; 2013–2019	Succeeded by Sarah Healey
