= Bruton School for Girls =

Coordinates: 51°05′57″N 2°28′08″W

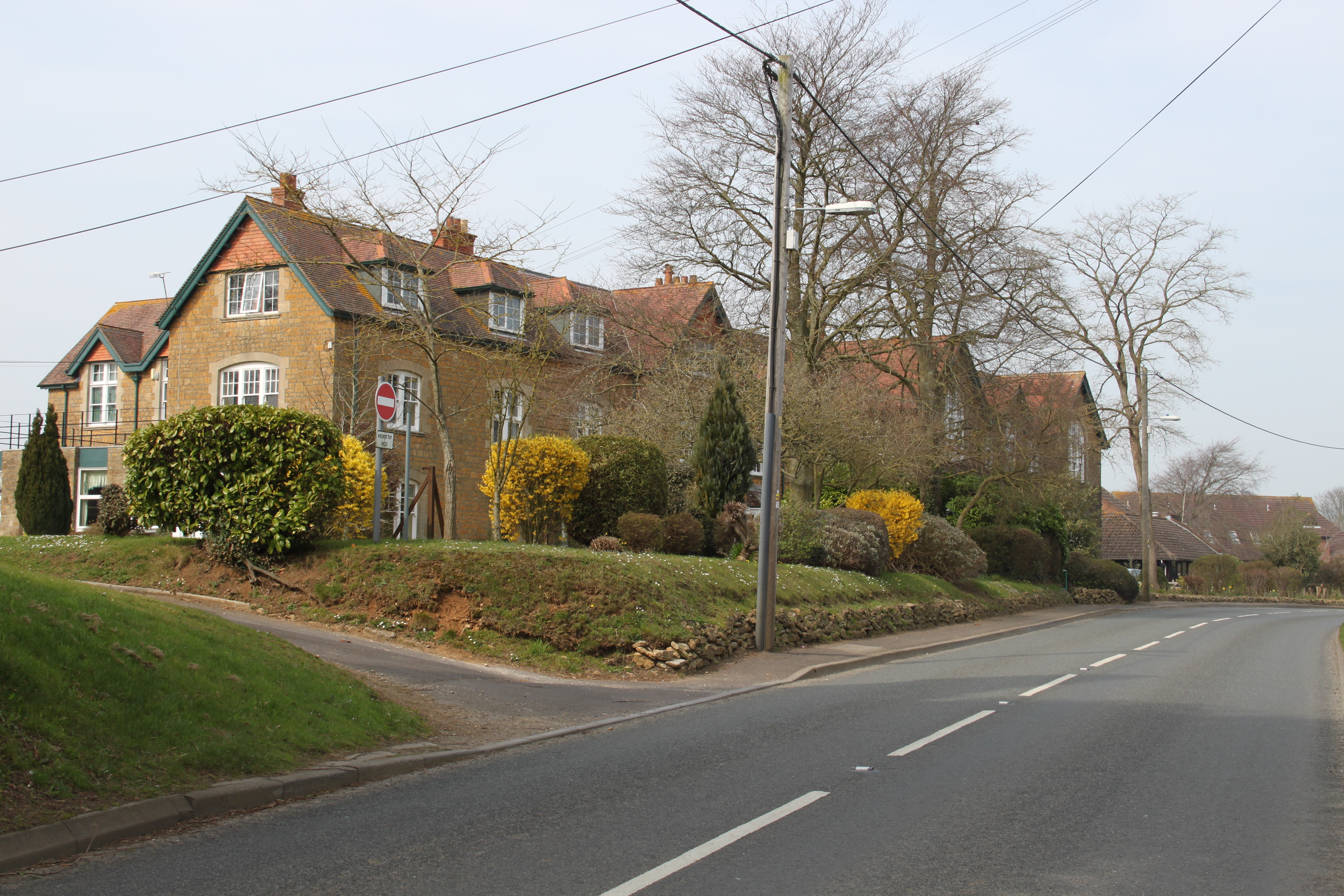

Location
- Sunny Hill; Bruton, Somerset, BA10 0NT; England

Information
- Type: Private day and boarding school
- Motto: Follow the Gleam
- Religious affiliation: Church of England
- Established: 1900
- Founders: Henry Hobhouse; Mr W. A. Knight
- Closed: 2022
- Department for Education URN: 123904 Tables
- Head teacher: Jane Evans
- Gender: Girls; Boys (age 2-7)
- Age: 2 to 18
- Enrolment: As of 2017: 220
- Houses: 4

Bruton School for Girls was a private day and boarding school for girls aged 2 to 18, near Pitcombe in Bruton in south east Somerset, England. It opened in 1900 as Sunny Hill School, and closed in 2022 following a fall in pupil numbers.

In 2009, the school comprised Sunny Hill Nursery, Sunny Hill Prep, a senior school and a sixth form with an overall attendance of approximately 250 pupils, of whom a third were boarders. A small number of boys also attended the pre-school and pre-prep.

== History ==
The school was founded in 1900 as a private day and boarding school and named Sunny Hill School. It was intended for local middle-class girls, and was planned to have a curriculum in line with that of Sexey's Trade School for Boys.

In 1911 it became a public secondary school and received an annual endowment from Hugh Sexey's charity and grants from Somerset County Council. After the passing of the Education Act 1944, Sunny Hill School became fully independent. In 1961, the school changed its name to Bruton School for Girls and in 1997 it extended its junior department to admit students from age 2.

The school motto was "Follow the Gleam".

In March 2022, the school joined The King's School, Bruton Foundation. In May 2022, the foundation announced that Bruton School for Girls would close at the end of the academic year owing to low pupil numbers; the expected enrolment in September of that year was 45.

== Headteachers ==
The first headteacher was Edith Radford. The final was Jane Evans.

== Notable former pupils ==
- Emily Eavis, co-organiser of the Glastonbury Festival
- Giselle Mather, English rugby union international and coach, part of the 1994 Women's World Cup winning side
- Patricia Moberly, public servant and former teacher
