= Martin Albrow =

British sociologist

President of the British Sociological Association
- In office 1985-1987
- Preceded by: Richard Brown
- Succeeded by: Jennifer Platt

Personal details
- Born: 1937 (age 88–89)
- Spouse: Sue Owen
- Occupation: Professor, sociologist
- Known for: Academic work on globalisation

Martin Albrow (born 1937) is a British sociologist, noted for his works on globalisation, the theory of the global age and global civil society. He was a full-time faculty member at Reading University, University College Cardiff and Roehampton University.

== Career ==
Albrow was appointed in 1963 as the first full-time sociologist at Reading University, and subsequently worked at University College Cardiff, where he was Head of Department, and at Roehampton University. He has also held visiting or guest positions at LMU Munich, the London School of Economics, the State University of New York at Stony Brook, the Beijing Foreign Studies University, and the University of Bonn.

Albrow was President of the British Sociological Association from 1985 to 1987, and the editor-in-chief of its journal Sociology from 1981 to 1984. Additionally, he was the founding editor of the International Sociological Association's journal, International Sociology. He wrote The Global Age: State and Society beyond Modernity, awarded the 1997 European Amalfi Prize, which argued against the view that globalisation was an inevitable one-way process, and that a new age had supplanted both the modern and postmodern ages. He is a Fellow of the Academy of Social Sciences.

Albrow co-edited Globalization, Knowledge, and Society—the first book to feature “globalization” in its title.

In recent years, his work has examined China’s development model, governance philosophy, and the concept of a “community with a shared future for mankind,” which he identifies as a significant departure from Western theses such as the “clash of civilizations.

In an interview with Xinhua on 29 October 2022, Albrow stated that Chinese strongman and Communist Party chief Xi Jinping was an "absolutely outstanding" political theorist and that his so-called Xi Jinping Thought was an "outstanding theoretical achievement of global significance".

== Bibliography ==
His books include:

- Bureaucracy, London, Pall Mall, 1970;
- Max Weber's Construction of Social Theory, London, Macmillan, 1990;
- The Global Age: State and Society beyond Modernity, Cambridge, Polity 1996;
- Do Organizations Have Feelings?, London and New York, Routledge, 1997;
- Sociology: The Basics, London and New York, Routledge, 1999;
- Global Age Essays on Social and Cultural Change, Frankfurt am Main, Klosterman, 2014.

The English-language edition of his book China's Role in a Shared Human Future was published in 2018. The book was launched at the London Book Fair.

== Personal life ==
Albrow lives in London with his wife, Sue Owen.

Academic offices
Preceded by Richard Brown (sociologist)	President of the British Sociological Association; 1985–1987	Succeeded by Jennifer Platt
