= Una O'Brien =

British civil servant

Dame Una O'Brien DCB
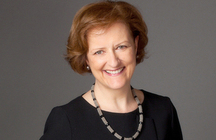

Permanent Secretary at the Department of Health
- In office 4 October 2010 – April 2016
- Secretary of State: Andrew Lansley; Jeremy Hunt
- Preceded by: Sir Hugh Taylor

Personal details
- Education: St Anne's College, Oxford
- Occupation: Civil servant

Dame Una O'Brien DCB is a British former civil servant, who served as the Permanent Secretary at the Department of Health. She became a Companion of the Order of the Bath (CB) in the New Year honours list 2011, and a Dame Commander of the Order of the Bath (DCB) in the 2015 Queen's Birthday Honours list.

O'Brien was educated at St Anne's College, Oxford, where she graduated with a B.A. degree in Modern History, Harvard University and the London School of Economics. She first joined the Department of Health in 1990 and held posts in the Department for Transport, the Prime Minister's Efficiency Unit and the National Health Service before returning to the Department of Health. She was appointed Permanent Secretary at the Department of Health in February 2010.

As of 2015, O'Brien was paid a salary of between £160,000 and £164,999 by the department, making her one of the 328 most highly paid people in the British public sector at that time.

Government offices
Preceded by Sir Hugh Taylor	Permanent Secretary at the Department of Health; 2010–2016	Succeeded by Sir Chris Wormald
