= Jeremy Pocklington =

Senior British civil servant

Jeremy Pocklington CB
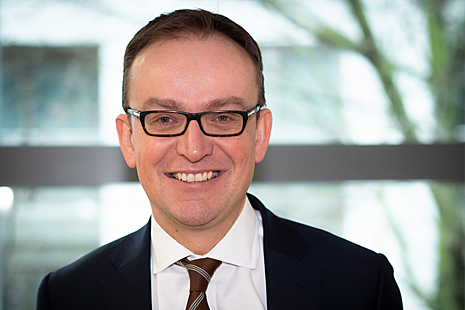

Permanent Under-Secretary of State for Defence
- Incumbent
- Assumed office 31 October 2025
- Prime Minister: Keir Starmer; Andy Burnham
- Preceded by: David Williams

Permanent Secretary of the Department for Energy Security and Net Zero
- In office 7 February 2023 – 31 October 2025
- Prime Minister: Rishi Sunak; Keir Starmer
- Minister: Grant Shapps; Claire Coutinho; Ed Miliband
- Preceded by: Sarah Munby (Note: As Permanent Secretary of the Department for Business, Energy and Industrial Strategy.)
- Succeeded by: Clive Maxwell

Permanent Secretary of the Department for Levelling Up, Housing and Communities (Note: Known as the Ministry of Housing, Communities and Local Government until 19 September 2021.)
- In office 30 March 2020 – 7 February 2023
- Prime Minister: Boris Johnson; Liz Truss; Rishi Sunak
- Minister: Robert Jenrick; Michael Gove; Greg Clark; Simon Clarke; Michael Gove
- Preceded by: Melanie Dawes
- Succeeded by: Sarah Healey

Personal details
- Born: 13 October 1973 (age 52)
- Spouse: Katy Wigley (m. 2005)
- Education: Exeter College, Oxford
- "New Ministry of Defence Permanent Secretary announced". GOV.UK (Press release). 31 October 2025.

Jeremy Mark Pocklington CB (born 13 October 1973) is a British civil servant who has served as Permanent Secretary of the Ministry of Defence from October 2025. He served as Permanent Secretary of the Department for Energy Security and Net Zero from February 2023 to November 2025 and previously at the Department for Levelling Up, Housing and Communities (DLUHC) from March 2020 (when it was the Ministry of Housing, Communities and Local Government (MHCLG)) to February 2023. He was formerly Director General for Housing and Planning at the MHCLG, having served in that role from August 2018 until his appointment as Permanent Secretary at the MHCLG.

== Early life and education ==
Pocklington was born on 13 October 1973 to David Pocklington and Valerie Pocklington. He was educated at Manchester Grammar School. He later studied at Exeter College in the University of Oxford, graduating with a Bachelor of Arts in Modern History in 1995. He later went on to graduate with a Master of Philosophy in Economics and Social History with distinction in 1997 from the same college.

== Career ==
Pocklington began his civil service career in 1997 when he joined HM Treasury, where over a number of years he was responsible for financial regulation, tax policy and fiscal policy, and, at one point, worked as an assistant private secretary to two Chief Secretaries to the Treasury. He was head of property tax from 2004 until 2006, when he became deputy director responsible for corporate finance and public-private partnerships, a position he remained in until 2009. In 2009 Pocklington joined the Cabinet Office as the Director of the National Economic Council secretariat. In 2010 he became director of the Economic and Domestic Affairs Secretariat.

In 2012, Pocklington was appointed as the director of the Enterprise and Growth Unit at HM Treasury, responsible for policy on growth, business, infrastructure and advising on public spending for a number of government departments. In 2015, Pocklington was appointed as Director General of the Markets and Infrastructure Group at the Department for Energy and Climate Change before being appointed as Director General for Energy and Security at the Department for Business, Energy and Industrial Strategy.

In 2018, Pocklington became Director General for Housing and Planning at the MHCLG.

Pocklington was appointed Companion of the Order of the Bath (CB) in the 2020 New Year Honours for public service.

On 30 March 2020, the then Cabinet Secretary, Sir Mark Sedwill, with the approval of the prime minister, approved the appointment of Pocklington as the new Permanent Secretary to the Ministry of Housing, Communities and Local Government following a brief period as acting Permanent Secretary following the resignation of Dame Melanie Dawes. When the Ministry for Housing, Communities and Local Government became the Department for Levelling Up, Housing and Communities in 2021, Pocklington became Permanent Secretary to the new department.

In February 2023, he became Permanent Secretary of the Department for Energy Security and Net Zero.

Pocklington was announced as the new Permanent Secretary at the Ministry of Defence on the 31st October 2025. He replaces David Williams who leaves the Civil Service after 35 years.

== Personal life ==
Pocklington married Katy Jane Wigley in 2005. He lists his recreations as hillwalking.

== Notes ==
Government offices
| Preceded by Melanie Dawes | Permanent Secretary of the Ministry of Housing, Communities and Local Government; 2020–2021 | Succeeded by Himself as Permanent Secretary of the Department for Levelling Up, Housing and Communities |
| Preceded by Himself as Permanent Secretary of the Ministry of Housing, Communities and Local Government | Permanent Secretary of the Department for Levelling Up, Housing and Communities; 2021–2023 | Succeeded by Sarah Healey |
| Preceded by Sarah Munby as Permanent Secretary of the Department for Business, Energy and Industrial Strategy | Permanent Secretary of the Department for Energy Security and Net Zero; 2023–present | Incumbent |
