= Jennifer Platt =

Jennifer Platt FAcSS is a sociologist who is emeritus Professor at the University of Sussex, where she taught from 1964 to 2002. She has been President of the British Sociological Association in 1987–89, and edited its journal Sociology for 1985–87. She was a member of the International Sociological Association's (ISA) executive from 1994 to 2002. Her research interests in the history of sociology have been reflected in her terms as Secretary and President of the ISA's Research Committee on the History of Sociology, as Chair of the American Sociological Association's Section on the History of Sociology, In 2002 she became an Academician of the Academy of Social Sciences. Her main publications include: The Affluent Worker in the Class Structure, 1969, (with Goldthorpe et al.); Realities of Social Research, Sussex University Press, 1976; A History of Sociological Research Methods in America, 1920-1960, Cambridge University Press, 1996; and The British Sociological Association: a Sociological History, SociologyPress, 2003.

Academic offices
Preceded by Martin Albrow	President of the British Sociological Association; 1987–1989	Succeeded by Sir Robert Burgess
