= Hugh Taylor (civil servant) =

British civil servant

Sir Hugh Taylor KCB

Chair of Guy's and St Thomas' NHS Foundation Trust
- Incumbent
- Assumed office 2011
- Preceded by: Patricia Moberly

Permanent Secretary at the Department of Health
- In office 2006–2010
- Secretary of State: Patricia Hewitt; Alan Johnson; Andy Burnham
- Preceded by: Sir Nigel Crisp

Personal details
- Born: 22 March 1950 (age 76)
- Education: Emmanuel College, Cambridge

Sir Hugh Henderson Taylor, KCB (born 22 March 1950) is a British former Permanent Secretary at the Department of Health and former Chair of Guy's and St Thomas' NHS Foundation Trust and King's College Hospital NHS Foundation Trust.

== Early life and education ==
Taylor was born on 22 March 1950. He was educated at Brentwood School and Emmanuel College, Cambridge.

== Career ==
Taylor began his Civil Service career at the Home Office in 1972 before joining the Department of Health in 1998, where he was Permanent Secretary between 2006 and 2010. He retired from that position on 31 July 2010, to become Chair of Guy's and St Thomas' NHS Foundation Trust in February 2011. He was also enlisted as the interim chair of Christie Hospital NHS Foundation Trust in March 2014 after Lord Keith Bradley resigned, and the law had to be changed to permit him to be a non-executive director of two NHS Trusts at the same time. He is also a trustee of the Nuffield Trust. In 2015 Taylor became independent Chair of the Accelerated Access Review for bringing innovative medical technologies to NHS patients.

Taylor was Permanent Secretary of the Department of Health at the time of the Stafford Hospital scandal. Taylor gave evidence to the Francis Inquiry which reviewed these deaths. The Francis Report cited one of the root causes of the failings at Mid Staffs as political and hence civil service pressure for Trusts to achieve the financial performance required to achieve Foundation Trust status, which led some trusts to cut nursing staff and other costs, and generally putting the achievement of arbitrary political financial targets ahead of patient safety and clinical quality.

Government offices
Preceded by Sir Nigel Crisp	Permanent Secretary at the Department of Health; 2006–2010	Succeeded by Una O'Brien
