= William Pile (civil servant) =

English civil servant (1919–1997)

Sir William Dennis Pile GCB MBE (1 December 1919 – 26 January 1997) was an English civil servant. Educated at St Catharine's College, Cambridge, he served in the Army during the Second World War, reaching the rank of Major. After completing his degree, he entered the Ministry of Education in 1947, serving on the UK delegation to UNESCO and then spending a year at the Cabinet Office (1950–51) before returning to the Ministry, which became the Department for Education and Science (DES) in 1964. From 1966 to 1970, he spent short periods at the Ministry of Health and the Home Office, the later as deputy secretary from 1967. From 1970 to 1976, he was Permanent Secretary to the DES. He was then chairman of the Board of Inland Revenue between 1976 and 1979. In this role Sir William appeared on the first edition of the BBC Radio 4 programme "Moneybox". The presenter Louise Botting challenged him about what she said was a lack of efficiency compared with the US Internal Revenue Service. Dissatisfied with his response, she responded "listening to you, Sir William, you make the Inland Revenue sound very benign and kindly. But people's experience just isn't like that."

In retirement, Sir William was a director of Nationwide Building Society and The Distillers Company.

Government offices
Preceded by Sir Herbert Andrew	Permanent Secretary, Department for Education and Science; 1970–1976	Succeeded by Sir James Arnot Hamilton
Preceded by Sir Norman Price	Chairman, Board of Inland Revenue; 1976–1979	Succeeded by Sir Lawrence Airey
