= Derek Andrews =

English civil servant

Sir Derek Henry Andrews, KCB, CBE (17 February 1933 – 13 March 2016) was an English civil servant. Educated at the London School of Economics, he joined the Ministry of Agriculture, Fisheries and Food in 1957 after completing National Service, and spent much of his career working on the Common Agricultural Policy. He was the ministry's Permanent Secretary from 1987 to 1993, leading it during the BSE and Salmonelli crises of the late 1980s. He was chairman of the Residuary Milk Marketing Board from 1994 to 2002.

Government offices
Preceded by Sir Michael Franklin	Permanent Secretary of the Ministry of Agriculture, Fisheries and Food; 1987–1993	Succeeded by Sir Richard Packer
