= Anthony Battishill =

British civil servant (1937–2024)

Sir Anthony Michael William Battishill GCB (4 July 1937 – 10 January 2024) was a British senior civil servant. He served as the chairman of the board of Inland Revenue from 1986 to 1997.

Battishill was appointed Knight Commander of the Order of the Bath (KCB) in the 1989 New Year Honours. He was promoted to Knight Grand Cross (GCB) in the 1997 New Year Honours.

Battishill died on 10 January 2024, at the age of 86.

Government offices
Preceded by Sir Lawrence Airey	Chairman of the Board of Inland Revenue; 1986–1997	Succeeded by Sir Nicholas Montagu
