= Jonathan Brearley =

CEO of GB energy regulator Ofgem starting 2020

- Born: 23 July 1973 (age 53)
- Education: University of Glasgow; University of Cambridge

Jonathan Brearley (23 July 1973) is the Permanent Secretary at Department for Energy Security and Net Zero. He was previously chief executive officer of Great Britain's energy regulator Ofgem.

== Early life ==
Brearley grew up in Wiltshire. His father served in the Royal Navy and later became a chartered surveyor. He attended Gillingham School, a comprehensive school in Dorset, and then studied for a BSc degree in maths and physics at University of Glasgow. Later, he studied for an MPhil degree in economics at University of Cambridge.

== Career ==
Brearley worked in Prime Minister Tony Blair’s strategy unit within 10 Downing Street from 2002 to 2006. He then transferred to work for the Department for Environment, Food and Rural Affairs while David Miliband was Secretary of State, where Brearley was tasked with setting up the Office of Climate Change. He then moved to the Department of Energy and Climate Change where he was director of electricity markets and networks.

After leaving the UK civil service, Brearley ran a consultancy working on projects in the energy industry including market reforms in India. He then joined Ofgem, working as executive director for systems and networks, and in February 2020 was appointed CEO where he is paid over £300,000 per year.

In February 2021, Brearley was appointed interim CEO of the UK Regulators Network. He was confirmed as CEO in March 2021.

In February 2026, Brearley was appointed Permanent Secretary for Department for Energy Security and Net Zero.

== Personal life ==
Brearley is married with two sons. They own a farmhouse in Buckinghamshire valued at £1 million, and another property in Dorset.
