= Nicholas Montagu =

British civil servant

Sir Nicholas Lionel John Montagu KCB (born 12 March 1944) is a retired British civil servant. He was Chairman of the Inland Revenue from 1997 to 2004, before its merger with Her Majesty's Customs and Excise to create Her Majesty's Revenue and Customs in 2005.

== Early life and education ==
Nick Montagu was educated at Rugby School and New College, Oxford, where he was Secretary of the Oxford Union, President of New College Junior Common Room and obtained a double First in classics, ancient history and philosophy. Whilst at New College, he was a member of the team that won the second series of University Challenge. Immediately after leaving Oxford in 1966, he became a lecturer in philosophy at Reading University, remaining there until 1974, when he joined the Civil Service as a Direct Entry Principal.

== Civil service career ==
Montagu served over the next 30 years in a number of government Departments, including Health and Social Security, the Cabinet Office, Transport and Social Security. He was involved, as a civil servant, in a number of key policies for both Labour and Conservative governments, including the establishment of executive agencies, major pension reforms and the privatisation of the railway. In 1997 he was appointed Chairman of the Inland Revenue through an open competition.

Over the next seven years, Montagu led the Inland Revenue through the greatest changes in its history, as it became a social department responsible for paying out what had previously been social security benefits and led the rest of Whitehall in the development of electronic services. He changed the culture of the department, making it more outward-facing and responsive to its customers, and took a particular interest in diversity, for which he was appointed the Civil Service Diversity Champion. Montagu also chaired the Civil Service Benevolent Fund. During his time the Revenue won numerous awards for its achievements in this field.

In his last year as chairman, Montagu became embroiled in two controversies, the first when the systems installed by IT firm EDS for the new tax credits system failed to work (EDS subsequently paid nearly £100m compensation for this failure ), and the second over the joint sale, with Customs, of the Revenue's estate to Mapeley Steps Limited headquartered in Bermuda. This decision, required by the Treasury as part of the 1998 public spending settlement, was based on legal advice that to have excluded the company would have been illegal under European law; it was subsequently described by the National Audit Office as a model for other departments and a commercially sound deal ["PFI: the STEPS Deal" HC: 530 2003-2004 ISBN 0102928045].

== Retirement ==
Since retiring in 2004, Montagu has been associated with a number of commercial activities, mainly in the pensions and insurance field and on PricewaterhouseCoopers' Advisory Board, and with higher education. He also developed and facilitated governance workshops for Ministers and civil servants in a number of developing countries.

He was Chairman of Council at Queen Mary, University of London from 2009 to 2017, Chair of the Committee of University Chairs from 2011 to 2014 and Chairman of the Financial Ombudsman Service from 2012 to 2019.

== Honours ==
Montague was appointed Knight Commander of the Order of the Bath (KCB) in the 2001 Birthday Honours, having previously been made a Companion of the Order of the Bath (CB).

== Personal life ==
Montagu is married and has two daughters.

Government offices
Preceded by Sir Anthony Battishill	Chairman of the Inland Revenue; 1997–2004	Succeeded by Sir David Varney
