= Jonathan Slater =

British civil servant (born 1961)

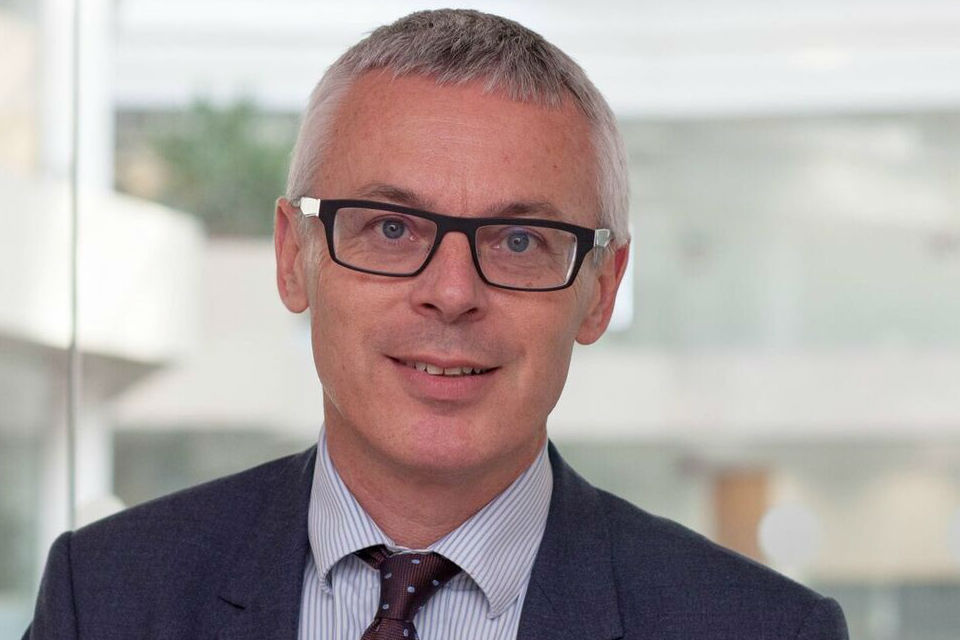

Permanent Secretary of the Department for Education
- In office April 2016 – 26 August 2020
- Prime Minister: David Cameron
- Preceded by: Melanie Dawes

Director-General, Economic and Domestic Secretariat, Cabinet Office
- In office October 2015 – 3 May 2016
- Prime Minister: David Cameron; Theresa May; Boris Johnson
- Minister: Nicky Morgan; Justine Greening; Damian Hinds; Gavin Williamson
- Preceded by: Chris Wormald
- Succeeded by: Susan Acland-Hood

Personal details
- Born: 29 November 1961 (age 64)

Jonathan Slater (born 29 November 1961) is a former high ranking British civil servant. From May 2016, he was Permanent Secretary of the Department for Education until his abrupt dismissal on 26 August 2020 following a controversy over national school examination grades.

== Career ==
Slater entered Civil Service in 2001 joining the Cabinet Office, having previously worked for the London Borough of Islington. After four years there, he moved to the Prime Minister's Delivery Unit at Number 10 Policy Unit in 2005, working on NHS reform and the capability review programme. In 2006, he transferred to the Ministry of Justice, working in the National Offender Management Service as its Director of Performance & Improvement, and then in 2008 as Chief Executive of the Office for Criminal Justice Reform, before being promoted in 2009 to Director-General, Transformation.

In July 2011, Slater moved to the Ministry of Defence as its Director-General, Transformation and Corporate Strategy, encouraged by his former Permanent Secretary Ursula Brennan. His position was subsequently changed to Director-General, Head Office and Commissioning Services.

In October 2015, Slater was appointed head of the Economic and Domestic Secretariat at the Cabinet Office, replacing Melanie Dawes. Seven months later he was again promoted to Permanent Secretary of the Department for Education, succeeding Chris Wormald who moved to the then-Department of Health.

In August 2020, the prime minister concluded that there was "a need for fresh official leadership” and Slater announced he was stepping down with effect from 1 September. The general secretary of the FDA union, Dave Penman, attacked the sacking in the following terms": "If it wasn't clear before, then it certainly is now - this administration will throw civil service leaders under a bus without a moment's hesitation to shield ministers from any kind of accountability." Slater was the fifth top civil servant to be sacked in as many months.

His wife is Jane Ramsey, Baroness Ramsey of Wall Heath, a Labour Party member of the House of Lords.

== See also ==
- Sally Collier

== Offices held ==
Government offices
Unknown	Director-General, Transformation; Ministry of Justice; 2009–2011	Unknown
Unknown	Director-General, Head Office and Commissioning Services; Ministry of Defence; 2011–2015	Succeeded by Mark Preston (acting)
Preceded by Melanie Dawes	Director-General, Economic and Domestic Secretariat, Cabinet Office; October 2015–April 2016	Succeeded by Shona Dunn
Preceded by Chris Wormald	Permanent Secretary of the Department for Education; 3 May 2016 – 31 August 2020	Succeeded by Susan Acland-Hood
