= Robin Young (civil servant) =

British civil servant

Sir Robin Young KCB

Permanent Secretary for Department for Culture, Media & Sport
- In office 1998–2001
- Secretary of State: Chris Smith
- Preceded by: Sir G. Hayden Phillips
- Succeeded by: Dame Susan Street

Permanent Secretary for Department of Trade & Industry
- In office June 2001 – March 2005
- Secretary of State: Patricia Hewitt
- Preceded by: Sir Michael Scholar
- Succeeded by: Sir Brian Bender

Personal details
- Born: 7 September 1948 (age 78) England, UK
- Education: Fettes College, Edinburgh; University College, Oxford
- Occupation: Businessman

Sir Robin Urquhart Young, KCB (born 7 September 1948) is a British retired civil servant. He was Permanent Secretary for the Department for Culture, Media and Sport from 1998 to 2001 and Permanent Secretary for the Department of Trade & Industry from 2001 to 2005.

== Personal life ==
Young was born in 1948, and educated at Fettes College, Edinburgh and at University College, Oxford. He was appointed Knight Commander of the Order of the Bath (KCB) in the 2002 Queen's Birthday Honours.

== Career ==
Young joined the Department of Environment where he worked on housing, environment and local government policy, later becoming Principal Private Secretary to Ministers during the 1980s. From April 1994 to June 1997 he was First Director of the Government Office for London. Between July 1997 and May 1998, he was Head of Economic and Domestic Affairs Secretariat, Cabinet Office. He was then Permanent Secretary at the Department for Culture, Media and Sport. From June 2001 to March 2005, he was Permanent Secretary at the Department of Trade & Industry.

After leaving the Civil Service in 2005, he went into business and was chairman at Dr Foster Intelligence, East of England International (EEI), Apex Communications, Circle Anglia, and A4e.

Government offices
Preceded by Sir Hayden Phillips	Permanent Secretary of the Department for Culture, Media and Sport; 1998–2001	Succeeded by Dame Susan Street
Preceded by Sir Michael Scholar	Permanent Secretary of the Department of Trade and Industry; 2001-2005	Succeeded by Sir Brian Bender
