= Amanda Brooks (civil servant) =

British civil servant (born 1971)

Amanda Melanie Brooks (née Kendall) CB CBE (born 23 April 1971) is a British civil servant. She is currently interim Permanent Secretary of the Department for Business and Trade.

Brooks joined the Civil Service in 1993. Her first role was within the Cabinet Office. She previously served as Director General for Trade Negotiations from February 2023 to April 2026, and was Director General for Trade Negotiations at the Department for International Trade from June 2021 to February 2023.

Brooks was named CB in the 2026 Birthday Honours.
