= Shona Dunn =

British civil servant

Shona Hunter Dunn CB (born 15 October 1969) is the CEO of the First Aid charity St John Ambulance and a former British civil servant, serving from 2018 to 2021 as the Second Permanent Secretary at the Home Office and from April 2021 to May 2024 as the Second Permanent Secretary at the Department of Health and Social Care.

== Biography ==
Dunn read for a BSc in biology at the University of Birmingham and then an MSc in ecology at Durham University, where her thesis was on "the affects [sic] of habitat fragmentation on the woodland edge micro-climate and on the structure and composition of woodland ground flora", after which she joined the Department for Environment in 1995 as a policy adviser. She rose through the various re-organisations of the department (Department of the Environment, Transport and the Regions, Office of the Deputy Prime Minister, and the Department for Communities and Local Government) and a stint as policy head of Westminster City Council in 2005–6, serving as the director for Fire and Resilience for 2008–11 and then for planning for 2011–13.

In 2013, Dunn was promoted to serve as director-general for education standards in the Department for Education, replacing Stephen Meek. After three years, she was appointed as the next Head of the Economic and Domestic Affairs Secretariat, replacing Jonathan Slater in 2016. In Summer 2018, it was announced that Dunn would be promoted to replace Patsy Wilkinson as the Second Permanent Secretary for the Home Office.

On 29 February 2020, she was appointed acting permanent secretary at the Home Office, following the sudden resignation of Sir Philip Rutnam. She returned to her role as Second Permanent Secretary following the appointment of Matthew Rycroft as Permanent Secretary in March 2020.

In April 2021 Dunn left the Home Office to become Second Permanent Secretary at the Department of Health and Social Care.

She was appointed Companion of the Order of the Bath (CB) in the 2023 Birthday Honours for public service.

In May 2024 it was announced that the Priory of England and the Islands of the Order of St John had approved Dunn's appointment as the next CEO of St John Ambulance with her due to take up the post in September 2024.

== Offices held ==
Government offices
Preceded by Stephen Meek	Director-General, Education Standards, Department for Education; 2013–2016	Succeeded by Paul Kett
Preceded by Jonathan Slater	Director-General, Economic and Domestic; Affairs Secretariat, Cabinet Office; 2016–2018	Succeeded by Sarah Healey
Preceded by Patsy Wilkinson	Second Permanent Secretary of the Home Office; October 2018 – April 2021	Succeeded by
Preceded by	Second Permanent Secretary of the Department of Health and Social Care; April 2021 – September 2024	Succeeded by Tom Riordan
