= Sarah Healey =

British civil servant

Dame Sarah Healey DCB CVO
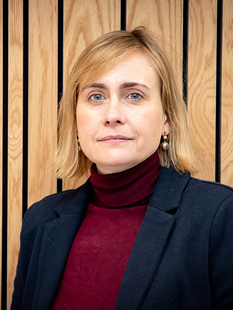
- Official portrait, 2023

Permanent Secretary to the Department for Work and Pensions
- Incumbent
- Assumed office 1 August 2026
- Prime Minister: Andy Burnham
- Minister: Pat McFadden
- Preceded by: Peter Schofield

Permanent Secretary to the Ministry of Housing, Communities and Local Government
- In office 7 February 2023 – 31 July 2026
- Prime Minister: Rishi Sunak; Keir Starmer; Andy Burnham
- Minister: Michael Gove; Angela Rayner; Steve Reed; Angela Rayner
- Preceded by: Jeremy Pocklington
- Succeeded by: Will Garton (interim)

Permanent Secretary of the Department for Digital, Culture, Media and Sport
- In office 1 April 2019 – 7 February 2023
- Prime Minister: Theresa May; Boris Johnson; Liz Truss; Rishi Sunak
- Minister: Jeremy Wright; Nicky Morgan; Oliver Dowden; Nadine Dorries; Michelle Donelan
- Preceded by: Dame Sue Owen
- Succeeded by: Ruth Hannant; Polly Payne (Note: As Acting Permanent Secretaries of the Department for Culture, Media and Sport.)

Personal details
- Born: Sarah Elizabeth Fitzpatrick; 1975 (age 50–51)
- Education: Magdalen College, Oxford; London School of Economics

Dame Sarah Elizabeth Healey DCB CVO (née Fitzpatrick; born 1975) is a British civil servant, appointed as Permanent Secretary to the Department for Work and Pensions in August 2026. Previously, she was Permanent Secretary at the Ministry of Housing, Communities and Local Government from 2023 to 2026, and at the Department for Digital, Culture, Media and Sport (DCMS).

== Life and career ==
Healey read Modern History and English at Magdalen College, Oxford graduating BA, before pursuing further studies in Social Policy at the London School of Economics (MSc). She was captain of the Magdalen team that won the 1997–98 series of BBC TV’s University Challenge. Having entered HM Civil Service into the Prime Minister's Strategy Unit in the Cabinet Office in 2001, she served in the Department for Education as the director for Strategy and Performance for a year from 2009, and then as director for Education Funding 2010–2013, and then in the Department for Work and Pensions as director for Private Pensions for just under a year in 2013. She is married to a barrister and has three children.

In December 2013, Healey was promoted Director General in the then-Department for Culture, Media and Sport. In mid 2016, she joined the new Department for Exiting the European Union as one of their two Directors General. After two years at DExEU, she moved to replace Shona Dunn as the head of the Economic and Domestic Affairs Secretariat.

In March 2019, it was announced that Healey had been further promoted, returning to DCMS to be the Permanent Secretary, replacing Dame Sue Owen.

Healey was appointed Companion of the Order of the Bath (CB) in the 2019 Birthday Honours for public service.

In February 2023, she replaced Jeremy Pocklington as Permanent Secretary to the Department for Levelling Up, Housing and Communities, which reverted to its old name, Ministry of Housing, Communities and Local Government, after the Labour government took power in July 2024 under Secretary of State for Housing, Communities and Local Government Angela Rayner.

She was appointed Commander of the Royal Victorian Order (CVO) in the 2023 Birthday Honours for services to the Royal Household.

In June 2026, it was announced that Healey had been appointed the new Permanent Secretary of the Department for Work and Pensions (DWP), taking up post in August 2026.

== Notes ==
Government offices
Preceded by Sue Owen	Permanent Secretary of the Department for Digital, Culture, Media and Sport; 2019–2023	Succeeded by Ruth Hannant; Polly Payne as Acting Permanent Secretaries of the Department for Culture, Media and Sport
Preceded by Jeremy Pocklington	Permanent Secretary of the Department for Levelling Up, Housing and Communities; 2023–present	Incumbent
