= Susan Acland-Hood =

British civil servant (born 1977)

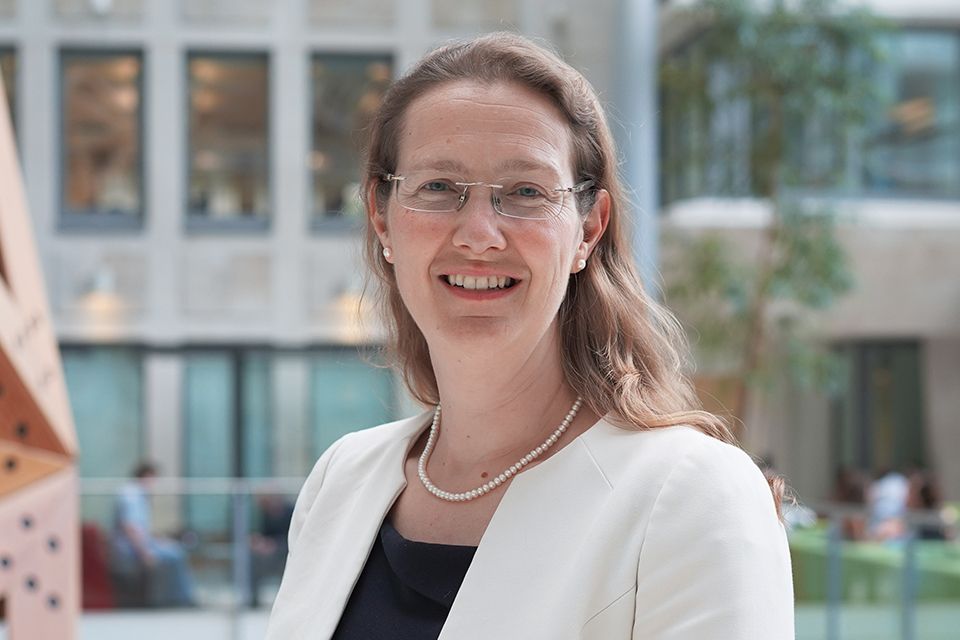
- Occupation: Civil servant
- Office: Permanent Secretary to the Department for Education
- Website: gov.uk/government/people/susan-acland-hood

Susan Acland-Hood is a British civil servant who is currently the Permanent Secretary to the Department for Education (DfE). She is also the Head of the Policy Profession for the Civil Service. Prior to taking on the role as Permanent Secretary, she was Chief Executive of HM Courts and Tribunals Service. From 2015 to 2016, Susan was Director of Enterprise and Growth at HM Treasury, responsible for policies on growth, energy, the environment, business, infrastructure, exports, competition and markets. She was Director of the Education and Funding Group at the DfE from 2013 to 2015, and before that held a range of posts covering education and justice policy, including in the Policy Unit at 10 Downing Street (for the Coalition Government) and as a No 10 Private Secretary to Gordon Brown. She has also served as Head of Strategy at the Home Office, as a Service Head in the London Borough of Tower Hamlets, and as a Deputy Director at the Social Exclusion Unit. Acland-Hood's civil service career began in the then Department for Education and Employment in 1999.

She was appointed as Permanent Secretary at the DfE in September 2020, initially on a temporary basis to help the Department recover from COVID examination results challenges. Following a competitive process, she was then confirmed as Permanent Secretary on 7 December 2020.

As part of the Partygate scandal, in 2021 Acland-Hood admitted to attending an event in December 2020 organised at the request of Education Secretary Gavin Williamson to thank staff. Approximately 50 members of staff were invited to the event and 20 to 30 attended in the staff canteen, where food and alcohol was consumed for around 60 minutes. At the time in London, national restrictions prohibited indoor gatherings of two or more people unless an exception applied, such as where the gathering was reasonably necessary for work purposes. Government guidance advised that people must not have a work Christmas lunch or party as a primarily social activity.

Under her leadership, DfE managed the later stages of the pandemic and recovery, and saw strong educational performance both on domestic measures and international rankings, most recently the international PISA rankings published in 2026 (for which the tests were taken in 2025). She also oversaw T-level delivery and expansion, improvements in apprenticeship achievements and completions, and initiated the V-level and vocational GCSE reforms. Following a wide and deep development and engagement programme, the department launched a major reform of the SEND system in early 2026, widely praised as an example of how to carry out controversial public service reform well. This joined an extensive programme of reform to Children's Social Care, already under way, which is showing results including improvements in social worker recruitment and retention.

She was appointed head of the Policy Profession for the Civil Service in 2025, having previously served as the Deputy Head. In this role, she leads on the development of policy skills and practice for the civil service. She is also the Civil Service Gender Champion, the President of the Civil Service Sports and Social Council, and the Patron of the Civil Service Choir.

Government offices
| Preceded by Natalie Ceeney | Chief Executive, HM Courts and Tribunals Service; 2016–2020 | Succeeded by Kevin Sadler |
| Preceded by Jonathan Slater | Permanent Secretary to the Department for Education; 1 September 2020 – present | Incumbent |
