= Samantha Jones (civil servant) =

British civil servant

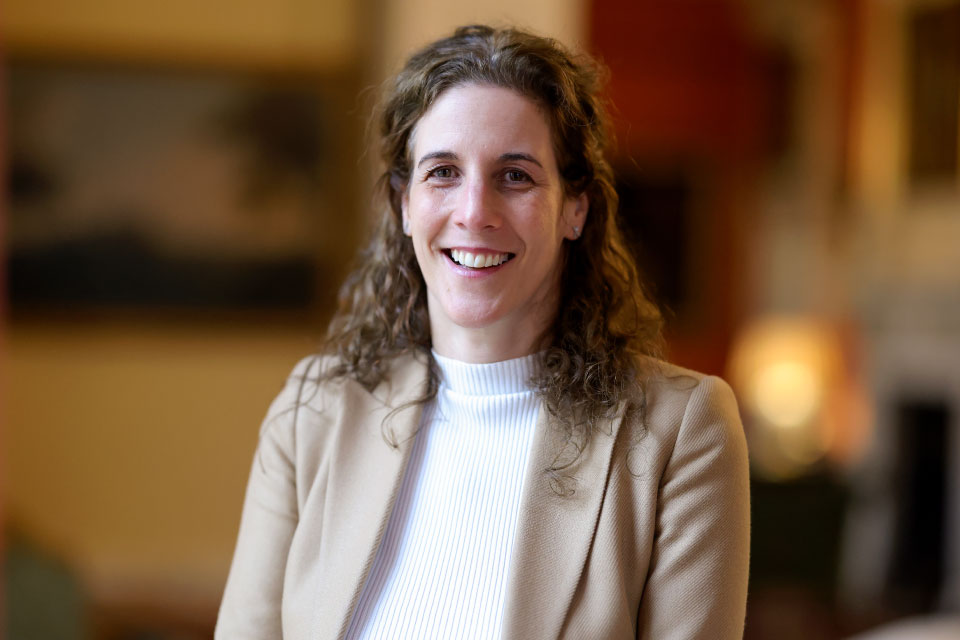
Samantha Jones

Samantha Geraldine Jones OBE (born 25 February 1971) is a UK health care professional working in the health and care services sector in England and has held senior positions in Government, the NHS and the independent health and care sector. She is currently serving as Permanent Secretary of the Department of Health and Social Care.

She began her NHS career in 1989 working as a nurse at the Hospital for Sick Children in Great Ormond Street. In 2007 she was appointed to the position of Chief Executive of Epsom and St Helier University Hospitals NHS Trust.

In 2011 Jones accepted a position as a director of Care UK before returning to the NHS, in 2013, as Chief Executive of West Hertfordshire Teaching Hospitals NHS Trust.

Described as "pioneering, brave, and courageous" by the judges, she was voted one of the top 50 innovators in the NHS in 2014.

In the same year she was voted Health Service Journal Chief Executive (video) of the year.

In 2015, as part of the NHS 5 year Forward View, she led NHS England's "New Models of Care Programme" tasked with designing and prototyping its future care models.

Returning to the private sector in 2019 as CEO of NHS care providers Operose Health – a UK subsidiary of the US Centene Corporation.

She was appointed interim permanent secretary and chief operating officer of the new Office of the Prime Minister in February 2022 having previously been Boris Johnson's Expert Adviser on NHS Transformation and Social Care.

Jones (under her married name of Harrison) was appointed an Officer of the Order of the British Empire (OBE) in Boris Johnson's 2022 Resignation Honours for public service.

She became a Non-Executive Director at the Department of Health and Social Care in 2023.

In June 2026 the Financial Times revealed that she was formerly a director and shareholder in Keys Group - the second largest owner of children’s care homes in the UK. Until June 2025 she was also an ‘operating partner’ at the private equity firm which owns Keys Group. She was appointed to her current government position in April 2025.
