= European Secretariat =

The European Secretariat was a secretariat in the United Kingdom Cabinet Office.

== See also ==
- Defence and Overseas Secretariat
- Economic and Domestic Affairs Secretariat
- Civil Contingencies Secretariat
