= Permanent secretary (United Kingdom) =

Senior civil servant in a UK government department

A permanent secretary, known formally in some government departments as the permanent under-secretary of state, is the most senior civil servant of a ministry in the United Kingdom, charged with running the department on a day-to-day basis. Permanent secretaries are appointed under a scheme in which the prime minister has the final say in the recruitment process; since 2015, the PM chooses directly from a list created by the Civil Service Commissioners rather than only having a veto over the Commissioners' preferred candidate.

Some permanent secretaries do not hold the position of permanent secretary but still hold that grade. The Transparency of Lobbying, Non-party Campaigning and Trade Union Administration Act 2014 explains that a permanent secretary, for the purposes of Section 2 of that Act, is a person serving in government in any of the following positions: Permanent Secretary, Second Permanent Secretary, Cabinet Secretary, Chief Executive of His Majesty's Revenue and Customs, Chief Medical Officer, Director of Public Prosecutions, First Parliamentary Counsel, Government Chief Scientific Adviser, Head of the Civil Service, or Prime Minister's Adviser for Europe and Global Issues.

Similar offices, often employing different terms, exist in many other Westminster-style systems and in some other governments. In Australia, New Zealand and India, departmental (or ministry) secretary is the analogous role; in Canada the equivalent is deputy minister.

== History ==
When Lord Grey took office as Prime Minister of the United Kingdom in 1830, Sir John Barrow was especially requested to continue serving as Secretary in his department (the Admiralty), starting the principle that senior civil servants stay in office on change of government and serve in a non-partisan manner. It was during Barrow's occupancy of the post that it was renamed permanent secretary.

== Role ==
The permanent secretary, who in some but not all government departments is known formally as the permanent under-secretary of state, is the accounting officer for a department, meaning that they are answerable to Parliament for ensuring that the department appropriately spends money granted by Parliament. Permanent secretaries are thus frequently called for questioning by the Public Accounts Committee and select committees of the House of Commons. The permanent secretary usually chairs a department's management board which consists of executive members (other civil servants in the department) and non-executive directors. In the 1970s, the permanent secretary to Tony Benn when he was Secretary of State for Industry was Peter Carey. After Benn spent government money on worker cooperatives, notably Meriden Motorcycle Co-operative, Carey went before the Public Accounts Committee and expressed the opinion that his minister's expenditure had been ultra vires. Benn was soon moved to the Department of Energy, while Carey received a knighthood in the following honours list.

Some larger departments also have a second permanent secretary who acts as deputy. In the early 1970s, in a major reorganisation of Whitehall, many smaller ministries were amalgamated into larger departments. Following this reorganisation, virtually all departments had second permanent secretaries for a time, though this is no longer as common.

The most senior civil servant is the Cabinet Secretary, currently Dame Antonia Romeo; the officeholder is normally also the Head of the Civil Service. The holder of this office is distinct from other officials of permanent secretary rank within the Cabinet Office. By convention, the Prime Minister is Minister for the Civil Service and as such makes regulations regarding the service and has authority over it. These duties are delegated to the Minister for the Cabinet Office.

== Honours ==
Permanent secretaries are usually created Knights/Dames Commander of the Order of the Bath after five or more years of service in the grade, or on retirement if not already holding the title (although Permanent Secretaries of the Foreign and Commonwealth Office are usually created Knights/Dames Commander of the Order of St Michael and St George instead). The most senior permanent secretaries, such as the Cabinet Secretary, may be created Knights/Dames Grand Cross of the Order of the Bath, and even be given a life peerage after retirement. For salary comparison purposes, the permanent secretary is deemed broadly equivalent to a general and to a High Court judge.

== Current permanent secretaries ==
Below is a list of the individuals in the UK government at the grade of permanent secretary. Some departments are currently led by persons that do not hold the rank of Permanent Secretary or do not have a civil service executive at all; these have not been included.

Permanent secretaries in the UK government
Department	Name	Title(s)	Start
Ministerial departments
Cabinet Office (including Office for the Prime Minister and Cabinet)	Dame Antonia Romeo	Cabinet Secretary; Head of the Civil Service	19 February 2026
Cabinet Office (including Office for the Prime Minister and Cabinet)	Cat Little	Permanent Secretary; Chief Operating Officer of the Civil Service	2 April 2024
Cabinet Office (including Office for the Prime Minister and Cabinet)	Michael Ellam	Second Permanent Secretary for European Union and International Economic Affairs	13 January 2025
Cabinet Office (including Office for the Prime Minister and Cabinet)	Clive Maxwell	Second Permanent Secretary; Chief Executive Officer of the OneGov Delivery Agency	23 July 2026
Cabinet Office (including Office for the Prime Minister and Cabinet)	Jessica de Mounteney	First Parliamentary Counsel	1 May 2024
Cabinet Office (including Office for the Prime Minister and Cabinet)	Adrian Bird	Chair of the Joint Intelligence Committee	3 July 2026
Cabinet Office (including Office for the Prime Minister and Cabinet)	Jonathan Powell	National Security Adviser	2 December 2024
Cabinet Office (including Office for the Prime Minister and Cabinet)	David Dinsmore	Director of Communications	30 July 2025
Department for Business, Innovation, Science and Trade	Amanda Brooks	Interim Permanent Secretary	6 April 2026
Department for Business, Innovation, Science and Trade	Dame Angela McLean	Government Chief Scientific Adviser	1 April 2023
Department for Digital, Culture, Media and Sport	Susannah Storey	Permanent Secretary	10 July 2023
Department for Education	Susan Acland-Hood	Permanent Secretary	1 September 2020
Department for Energy Security and Net Zero	Jonathan Brearley	Permanent Secretary	6 March 2026
Department for Energy Security and Net Zero	Vacant	Second Permanent Secretary	23 July 2026
Department for Environment, Food and Rural Affairs	Paul Kissack	Permanent Secretary	13 October 2025
Department for Environment, Food and Rural Affairs	Nick Joicey	Second Permanent Secretary; Chief Operating Officer	17 July 2023; On leave since January 2025
Department for Transport	Jo Shanmugalingam	Permanent Secretary	1 July 2025
Department for Transport	Vacant	Second Permanent Secretary	1 July 2025
Department for Work and Pensions	Dame Sarah Healey	Permanent Secretary	1 August 2026
Department of Health and Social Care	Samantha Jones	Permanent Secretary	April 2025
Department of Health and Social Care	Matthew Style	Interim Second Permanent Secretary; Chief Operating Officer	March 2026
Department of Health and Social Care	Sir Chris Whitty	Chief Medical Officer for England	1 October 2019
Department of Health and Social Care	Susan Hopkins	Chief Executive Officer of the UK Health Security Agency	September 2025
Foreign, Commonwealth and Development Office	Lindy Cameron	Permanent Secretary	19 October 2026
Foreign, Commonwealth and Development Office	Nick Dyer	Second Permanent Secretary; Head of His Majesty's Diplomatic Service	3 July 2023
HM Treasury	James Bowler	Permanent Secretary	17 October 2022
HM Treasury	Beth Russell	Second Permanent Secretary for Darlington Economic Campus	17 October 2022
HM Treasury	Jim O'Neil	Second Permanent Secretary	14 May 2025
HM Treasury	Fiona Dunsire	Government Actuary	1 November 2023
Home Office	Gareth Davies	Permanent Secretary	6 April 2026
Home Office	Simon Ridley	Second Permanent Secretary for the Migration and Borders System	18 April 2023
Ministry of Defence	Jeremy Pocklington	Permanent Secretary	31 October 2025
Ministry of Defence	Vacant	Chief Executive Officer of Defence Equipment and Support	1 April 2026
Ministry of Defence	Maddy McTernan	Chief of Defence Nuclear	6 September 2023
Ministry of Housing, Communities and Local Government	Tom Riordan	Permanent Secretary	21 September 2026
Ministry of Justice	Jo Farrar	Permanent Secretary; Clerk of the Crown in Chancery	1 July 2025
Ministry of Justice	Clara Swinson	Second Permanent Secretary	April 2026
Northern Ireland Office	Julie Harrison	Permanent Secretary	6 September 2023
Non-ministerial departments and non-departmental public bodies
Crown Prosecution Service	Stephen Parkinson	Director of Public Prosecutions	1 November 2023
Government Communications Headquarters (GCHQ)	Anne Keast-Butler	Director of the Government Communications Headquarters	12 May 2023
Government Legal Department	Douglas Wilson	His Majesty's Procurator General; Treasury Solicitor; Head of the Government Legal Profession	13 April 2026
HM Revenue and Customs	John-Paul Marks	First Permanent Secretary; Chief Executive	6 April 2025
HM Revenue and Customs	Angela MacDonald	Second Permanent Secretary; Deputy Chief Executive; Tax Assurance Commissioner	1 August 2020
National Crime Agency	Graeme Biggar	Director General of the National Crime Agency	5 October 2021
Office for Standards in Education, Children's Services and Skills	Sir Martyn Oliver	His Majesty's Chief Inspector	1 January 2024
Secret Intelligence Service (MI6)	Blaise Metreweli	Chief of the Secret Intelligence Service	1 October 2025
Security Service (MI5)	Sir Ken McCallum	Director General of the Security Service	25 April 2020
Office for National Statistics	André Loranger	National Statistician	2 November 2026
Office for National Statistics	Darren Tierney	Permanent Secretary	5 August 2025
Devolved governments
Northern Ireland Executive	Jayne Brady	Head of the Northern Ireland Civil Service	1 September 2021
Scottish Government	Joe Griffin	Permanent Secretary	6 April 2025
Welsh Government	Andrew Goodall	Permanent Secretary	9 September 2021

== See also ==
- His Majesty's Civil Service
- His Majesty's Diplomatic Service
- List of undersecretary positions
- Departments of the Government of the United Kingdom
- Parliamentary private secretary
- Parliamentary under-secretary of state
- Permanent secretary
- Principal Secretary (disambiguation)
- Private secretary
- Undersecretary
- Yes Minister, a satirical examination of the role of permanent secretaries
