= Maneuver warfare =

Military strategy focused on movement

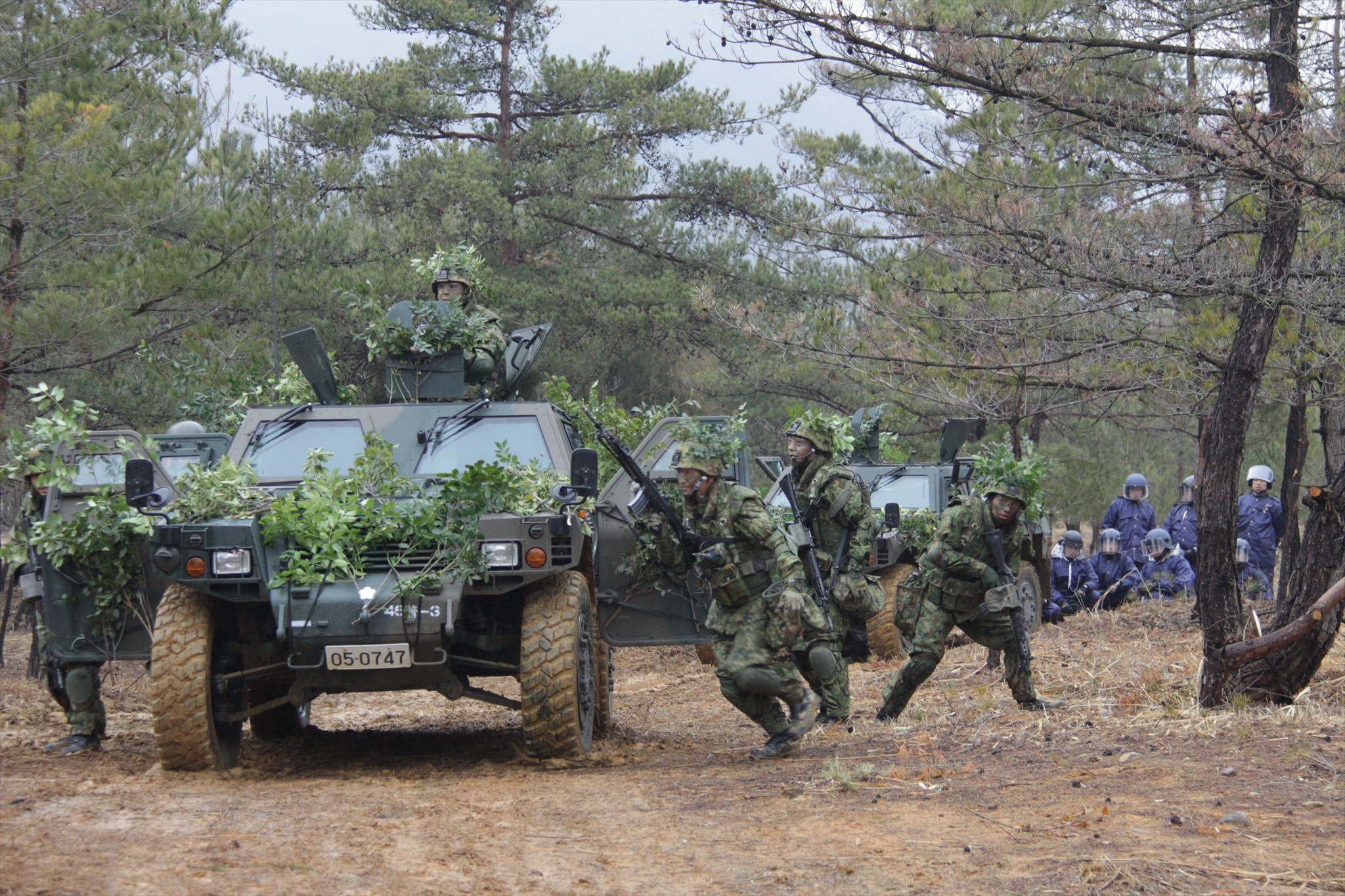
Japan Ground Self-Defense Force soldiers disembarking from their vehicles to counter a simulated ambush

Maneuver warfare (American English), manoeuvre warfare (Commonwealth English), or manoeuver warfare (less common; North American English), is a military strategy which emphasizes movement, initiative and surprise to achieve a position of advantage. Maneuver seeks to inflict losses indirectly by envelopment, encirclement and disruption, while minimizing the need to engage in frontal combat. In contrast to attrition warfare where strength tends to be applied against strength, maneuver warfare attempts to apply strength against weakness in order to accomplish the mission.

Maneuver warfare, and the use of initiative, originality and the unexpected, seeks to avoid opponents' strengths, while exploiting their weaknesses and attacking their critical vulnerabilities, and is the conceptual opposite of attrition warfare. Rather than seeking victory by applying superior force and mass to achieve physical destruction, maneuver uses preemption, deception, dislocation, and disruption to destroy the enemy's will and ability to fight.

Historically, maneuver warfare was stressed by small militaries, more cohesive, better trained, or more technologically advanced than attrition warfare counterparts. The term "tactical maneuver" is used by maneuver warfare theorists to refer to movement by forces to gain "advantageous position relative to the enemy," as opposed to its use in the phrase "maneuver warfare."

The idea of using rapid movement to keep an enemy off balance is as old as war itself. However, advanced technology, such as the development of cavalry and mechanized vehicles, has led to an increased interest in the concepts of maneuver warfare and in its role on modern battlefields.

== Concepts ==
Although most battles between established armies have historically been fought based on attrition warfare strategies, many military doctrines and cultures are based on replete historical examples of maneuver warfare.

The view on attrition warfare involves moving masses of men and materiel against enemy strongpoints, with the emphasis on the destruction of the enemy's physical assets, success as measured by enemy combatants killed, equipment and infrastructure destroyed, and territory taken or occupied. Attrition warfare tends to use rigidly-centralized command structures that require little or no creativity or initiative from lower-level leadership (also called top-down or "command push" tactics).

Conventional warfare doctrine identifies a spectrum with attrition warfare and maneuver warfare on opposite ends. In attrition warfare, the enemy is seen as a collection of targets to be found and destroyed. It exploits maneuver to bring to bear firepower to destroy enemy forces. Maneuver warfare, on the other hand, exploits firepower and attrition on key elements of opposing forces.

Maneuver warfare suggest that strategic movement can bring the defeat of an opposing force more efficiently than simply contacting and destroying enemy forces until they can no longer fight. Instead, in maneuver warfare, the destruction of certain enemy targets, such as command and control centers, logistical bases, or fire support assets, is combined with isolation of enemy forces and the exploitation by movement of enemy weaknesses.

Bypassing and cutting off enemy strongpoints often results in the collapse of that strongpoint even where the physical damage is minimal, such as the Maginot Line. Firepower, primarily used to destroy as many enemy forces as possible in attrition warfare, is used to suppress or destroy enemy positions at breakthrough points during maneuver warfare. Infiltration tactics, conventionally or with special forces, may be used extensively to cause chaos and confusion behind enemy lines.

The retired officer and military theory author Robert Leonhard summarizes maneuver warfare theory as "preempt, dislocate, and disrupt" the enemy as alternatives to the destruction of enemy mass through attrition warfare.

Since tempo and initiative are so critical to the success of maneuver warfare, command structures tend to be more decentralized with more tactical freedom given to lower-level unit leaders. Decentralized command structures allows "on the ground" unit leaders but still works within the guidelines of the commander's overall vision, to exploit enemy weaknesses as they become evident, which is also called "recon-pull" tactics or directive control.

The war theorist Martin van Creveld identifies six main elements of maneuver warfare:

- Tempo: as illustrated by John Boyd's OODA loop.
- Schwerpunkt ('focal point'): the center of effort, or striking the enemy at the right place at the right time. According to van Creveld, ideally, a spot that is both vital and weakly defended.
- Surprise: Leaving the enemy unable to counter an action is central to any maneuver, and may be achieved by their remaining unaware for as long as possible
- Combined arms: the use of multiple means by which to attack the enemy creates an opportunity cost to any reaction. Should the enemy counter against one form of attack, they may leave themselves vulnerable to another. Additionally, different forms of attack may support each other through concurrent action (ex: Infantry supporting armor in such a way that the infantry has more available firepower, and the armor has protection from ambush)
- Flexibility: a military must be well rounded, self-contained and redundant. By maintaining different avenues of attack, either in method, movement, or any other factor, alternatives are always available, and opportunities can always be seized
- Decentralized command: rapidly changing situations may outpace the orders of a centralized command, leaving personnel with instructions that no longer apply. Lower levels of command must understand overall intent so as to adapt to a changing environment.

== History ==
=== Mongol use ===
The Mongol emperor Genghis Khan used a military system of maneuver warfare that focused on rapid, decisive maneuver, utilizing the skill and endurance of his Mongol horsemen. He used operational maneuver, command and control, deception, and precise battlefield tactics which were vastly superior to those of his opponents in China, Russia, Persia, and Eastern Europe and defeated virtually every enemy army that he faced.

An example of his usage of maneuver warfare was the defeat and annexation of the Khwarazmian Empire between 1219 and 1221 CE, which wielded an army nearly three times the Mongol army, in just a few months of fighting. The Mongol army's constant movement and maneuvering tied down the Khwarazmian forces, denying them the ability to gain the initiative as well as shocked and demoralized the Khwarazmian Shah Ala ad-Din Muhammad as well as his army, thus ending the campaign before the Shah could bring to bear his much larger numbers.

=== Napoleon's use ===
Similar strategies are also possible using suitably trained infantry. Napoleon I used preemptive movements of cavalry and fast infantry to interrupt the initial deployment of enemy forces. This allowed his forces to attack where and when he wanted, enabling force concentration, possibly in combination with advantage of terrain. It disabled effective coordination of enemy forces, even when they were superior in numbers. That was effective tactically and strategically.

During his time as a general and indeed his power base to become the head of France, Napoleon's reputation was based on a powerful and fluid campaign in northern Italy, opposing the numerically superior Austrians. He cited Henri de La Tour d'Auvergne, Viscount of Turenne as one major source of his strategy.

He trained a normal, if rather undisciplined, French Army of Italy into moving faster than most thought possible. That was partially because his army lived off the land and had no big logistical "tail." Both his ability to move huge armies to give battle where he wanted and the style of his choice would become legendary, and he was seen as undefeatable, even against larger and superior forces.

Napoleon also arranged his forces into what would be known in the present as "battle groups" of combined arms formations to allow faster reaction time to enemy action. That strategy is an important quality in supporting the effectiveness of maneuver warfare and was used again by Carl von Clausewitz.

Napoleon's principal strategy was to move fast to engage before the enemy had time to organize, to engage lightly while moving to turn the flank that defended the main resupply route, to envelop and deploy blocking forces to prevent reinforcement, and to defeat those contained in the envelopment in detail. All of those activities imply faster movement than the enemy as well as faster reaction times to enemy activities.

His use of fast mass marches (forced foot marches) to gain strategic advantage, cavalry probes, and screens to hide his movements; deliberate movement to gain psychological advantage by isolating forces from one another; and their headquarters are all hallmarks of maneuver warfare. One of his major concerns was the relatively slow speed of infantry movement relative to the cavalry.

It was that and subsequent defeats that caused a major doctrinal reevaluation by the Prussians under Clausewitz of the revealed power of maneuver warfare. The results of that review were seen in the Franco-Prussian War.

=== Mechanization ===
In the mid-19th century, various forms of mechanized transport were introduced, starting with trains running on steam power. That resulted in significant logistic improvements. Opposing armies were no longer limited in speed by the pace of march. Some train-borne maneuvering took place during the American Civil War in the 1860s, but the sizes of the armies involved meant that the system could provide only limited support. Armored trains were among the first armored fighting vehicles employed by mankind.

During the Franco-Prussian War, the Prussians, knowing that the French could field a larger army than theirs, made a plan that required speed by surrounding the French strongpoints and destroying or bypassing them; it was called the Kesselschlacht, or 'cauldron battle'. The remainder of the army could advance unopposed to take important objectives. If war was declared, Prussia could quickly mobilize and invade. That tactic was used to devastating effect in 1870 since Prussian forces surrounded and defeated French forces, captured Napoleon III and besieged Paris. The Germans' battle plans for World War I were similar. Germany attempted to repeat the "knock-out blow" against the French armies in the Schlieffen Plan. However, technology evolved significantly in the preceding four decades; both the machine gun and more powerful artillery shifted the balance of power toward the defense. All combatants were desperate to get the front moving again, but that proved to be difficult.

Germany introduced new tactics with infiltration and stormtrooper "shock troops" toward the end of World War I to bypass resistance. Russian general Aleksei Brusilov used similar tactics in 1916 on the Eastern Front during the Brusilov Offensive.

The introduction of fully armored tanks, in a series of increasingly successful operations, presented a way out of the deadlock of attrition and trench warfare, but World War I ended before the British would field thousands of tanks to be put in a large-scale offense. Fuller had proposed Plan 1919 to use tanks to break through the lines and then to wreak havoc on the German lines of supply and communication.

During the interwar period, the British developed ideas for fully-mechanized all-arms warfare with the Experimental Mechanized Force. The Germans reviewed their doctrine and revised their approach by expanding on infiltration tactics and amplifying them with motor transport. Heinz Guderian was a leading proponent of armored combat. The German military stressed several key elements: versatile tanks combined with mobile infantry and artillery, close air support, rapid movement and concentration of forces (Schwerpunkt), and aggressive independent local initiative. All was strictly coordinated by radio and contributed to new tactics during the Battle of France in 1940. Theories in Germany about armored warfare have some similarities with interwar theories of British officers J.F.C. Fuller and B. H. Liddell Hart, which the British army failed to embrace and understand fully.

There are similarities between blitzkrieg and the Soviet concept of "deep battle," which the Soviets used to great effect in 1944 and continued to use as a doctrine during the Cold War.

=== Soviet deep battle ===
In the Soviet Union during the 1920s and the 1930s, the concept of "deep battle" was developed and integrated into the Red Army field regulations doctrine by Marshal Mikhail Tukhachevsky. That led to the creation of cavalry mechanised groups during World War II and to operational maneuver groups during the Cold War.

=== Maoist China ===
Mobile warfare (Chinese: 运动战; pinyin: yùndòngzhàn) is a military strategy of the People's Republic of China employing conventional forces on fluid fronts with units maneuvering to exploit opportunities for tactical surprise, or where a local superiority of forces can be realized. One of early CCP leader Mao Zedong's three forms of warfare (Chinese: 战争形式; pinyin: zhànzhēng xíngshì), mobile warfare was the primary form of warfare used by Chinese communist forces from the early 1930s to the conclusion of the Chinese Civil War. The other two forms of warfare that Mao defined in On Protracted War, guerrilla warfare (游击战; yóujīzhàn) and positional warfare (阵地战; zhèndìzhàn), were less frequently employed.

The most notable example of Chinese mobile warfare was the Long March, a massive military retreat in which Mao marched in circles in Guizhou until he had confused the vastly larger armies pursuing him, and was then able to slip through Yunnan and Sichuan, although the retreat was completed by only one-tenth of the force that left for the Long March at Jiangxi.

The Chinese People's Volunteer Army's first five campaigns in the Korean War were characterized by a strategy of mobile warfare, in which the PVA encircled the enemy through maneuvers and sought to annihilate the enemy. Then it entered a stage of positional warfare, when both the PVA and UN forces fought to a stalemate along the 38th parallel north.

=== US Marine Corps doctrine ===
According to the US Marine Corps, one key concept of maneuver warfare is that maneuver is traditionally thought of as a spatial concept, the use of maneuver to gain positional advantage. The US Marine concept of maneuver, however, is a "warfighting philosophy that seeks to shatter the enemy's cohesion through a variety of rapid, focused, and unexpected actions which create a turbulent and rapidly deteriorating situation with which the enemy cannot cope."

The US Marine manual goes on to say:

"This is not to imply that firepower is unimportant. On the contrary, firepower is central to maneuver warfare. Nor do we mean to imply that we will pass up the opportunity to physically destroy the enemy. We will concentrate fires and forces at decisive points to destroy enemy elements when the opportunity presents itself and when it fits our larger purposes."

The possibility of a massive Soviet offensive in Western Europe led to the creation of the US Army's AirLand battle doctrine. Though far from focusing on maneuver, it emphasized using combined arms to disrupt an enemy's plan by striking through their depth and was seen as moving toward maneuver warfare in comparison to the earlier active defense concept. The AirLand doctrine was seen by Martin van Creveld as "arguably a half way house between maneuver and attrition".

=== British air maneuver doctrine ===
The British Joint Forces are limited to consider air assault or airmobile operations in their 2016 publication "Joint Doctrine Note on Air Manoeuvre".

=== Limitations in a modern context ===
A key requirement for success in maneuver warfare is up-to-date accurate intelligence on the disposition of key enemy command, support, and combat units. In operations whose intelligence is either inaccurate, unavailable, or unreliable, the successful implementation of strategies based on maneuver warfare can become problematic. When faced with a maneuverable opponent capable of redeploying key forces quickly and discreetly or when tempered, the capacity of maneuver warfare strategies to deliver victory becomes more challenging.

The 2006 Lebanon War is an example of such shortcomings being exposed. Despite overwhelming firepower and complete air superiority, Israeli forces were unable to deliver a decisive blow to the command structure of Hezbollah or to degrade its effective capacity to operate. Although inflicting heavy damage, Israel was unable to locate and destroy Hezbollah's diluted force dispositions or to neutralize key command centers. Therefore, it did not meet its war aims. The insurgency in Iraq also demonstrates that a military victory over an opponent's conventional forces does not automatically translate into a political victory.

Some military theorists such as William Lind and Colonel Thomas X. Hammes propose to overcome the shortcomings of maneuver warfare with the concept of what they call fourth generation warfare. For example, Lieutenant-Colonel S.P. Myers writes that "maneuver is more a philosophical approach to campaign design and execution than an arrangement of tactical engagements". Myers goes on to write that maneuver warfare can evolve and that "maneuverist approach in campaign design and execution remains relevant and effective as a counter-insurgency strategy at the operational level in contemporary operations."

In the early stages of the 2022 Russian invasion of Ukraine, Russia's advances were stalled by Ukraine's widespread deployment of man-portable anti-tank missiles. The scholar Seth Jones argued that Russia was forced to abandon maneuver warfare after an inept failure to apply combined arms, forcing a transition to a war of attrition. Ukrainian forces attempted to use maneuver warfare during the 2023 Ukrainian counteroffensive but their advances became stalled due to Russian prepared defenses in the form of minefields and trenches. Later in the war, Ukrainian forces used maneuver warfare more effectively during the start of the 2024 Kursk Oblast incursion where Russian forces initially struggled to repel the attack. However, that advance later stalled. According to Michael Kofman "Russian forces do far better when they're operating with prepared defense, fixed lines, more on positional warfare."

== See also ==
- Charge
- Decision cycle
- Defeat in detail
- Flanking maneuver
- Historical examples of flanking maneuvers
- OODA loop
- Pincer movement
- Russian military deception
- Operational manoeuvre group

== Sources ==
- Boyd, John. Patterns of Conflict. 1986.
- Simpkin, Richard E. Race to the Swift: Thoughts on Twenty-First Century Warfare. Brassey's, 2000.
- Richard Simpkin in association with John Erickson Deep Battle: The Brainchild of Marshal Tukhachevskii, London, Brassey's Defence, 1987. ISBN 0-08-031193-8
- Lind, William S. Maneuver Warfare Handbook. 1985. Westview Special Studies in Military Affairs. Westview Press Inc. Boulder, CO.
- Leonhard, Robert.The Art of Maneuver: Maneuver-Warfare Theory and Air-Land Battle. 1991. Presidio Press. Novato, CA.
- MajGen Ray Smith, USMC (ret.) and Bing West (1 August 2003). "Implications from Iraqi Freedom for the Marine Corps". Westwrite. Archived from the original on 27 September 2007. "The first war fought under the new doctrine of Maneuver Warfare, with several observations and suggestions for future change."
