= Engagement (military) =

Combat between two military forces, often a part of a bigger battle

In a broad sense, a military engagement is any physical confrontation between belligerents. In military doctrine, however, it is more precisely defined as combat between two forces – neither larger than a division nor smaller than a company – in which each has an assigned or perceived mission. An engagement begins when the attacking force initiates combat in pursuit of its mission, and ends when the attacker has accomplished the mission, or ceases to try to accomplish the mission, or when one or both sides receive sufficient reinforcements, thus initiating a new engagement.

As a tactical mission, the engagement is often a part of a battle. An engagement normally lasts one to two days; it may be as brief as a few hours and is rarely longer than five days. It is at this scale of combat that tactical engagement ranges of weapons and support systems become important to the troops and their commanders.

== See also ==
- Meeting engagement
- Military campaign

== Sources ==
- Dupuy, T.N. (Col. ret.), Understanding war: History and Theory of combat, Leo Cooper, London, 1992
- Simpkin, Richard, Race to the Swift: Thoughts on Twenty-first Century Warfare. Foreword by Donn A. Starry. London: Brassey's Defence, 1985. ISBN 0-08-031170-9.
