= Meirion Thomas =

Welsh botanist and plant physiologist

Meirion Thomas FRS FRSE
- Born: 28 December 1894
- Died: 5 April 1977 (aged 82)
- Education: Friars School, Bangor
- Alma mater: University of Cambridge (BA, MA)
- Scientific career
- Institutions: Kings College, Newcastle; Newcastle University; Royal Welch Fusiliers; Officers' Training Corps; South Wales Borderers
- Doctoral students: David Alan Walker

Meirion Thomas (28 December 1894 – 5 April 1977) was a 20th-century Welsh botanist and plant physiologist.

== Education and early life ==
Thomas was born on 28 December 1894 at 2 Menai Terrace in Bangor, Wales, the son of John Thomas, Vice Principal of Bangor Normal College, and his wife, Catherine Ann Roberts. He was educated at Friars School, Bangor from 1906 to 1912 and began studies at the University of Cambridge but this was interrupted by the war.

In the First World War he served with the Royal Welsh Fusiliers. He then won a commission in the South Wales Borderers. He was then transferred to the Gas Warfare section, and rose to the rank of captain.

He returned to Cambridge in 1919, studying Botany. He graduated with a Bachelor of Arts (BA) degree in 1921 and a Master of Arts (MA) degree in 1925.

== Career and research ==
From 1924 Thomas worked at the Armstrong College in Newcastle-upon-Tyne, first as a lecturer in botany and plant physiology, rising to senior lecturer and reader. In 1946 he was appointed Professor of Botany at Kings College, Newcastle. He retired in 1961 but was part of the college's push for university status (which was obtained in 1963) thereafter being known as Newcastle University. He also served as a captain in the Officer Training Corps.

=== Awards and honours ===
In 1945 he was elected a Fellow of the Royal Society of Edinburgh (FRSE). His proposers were John Heslop-Harrison, Alfred Hobson, Ernest Dunlop and Robert Wheldon. In 1949 he was elected a Fellow of the Royal Society (FRS), his canditaure citation referring to his research investigating catabolic processes in plants.

== Personal life ==
Thomas died on 5 April 1977 at Bryn Crug near Tywyn in Wales. He was unmarried and had no children.
