= Denis Barnes =

English civil servant

Barnes in 1967.

Sir Denis Charles Barnes, KCB (15 December 1914 – 6 May 1992) was an English civil servant. Educated at Hulme Grammar School, Manchester, and Merton College, Oxford, he entered the civil service in 1937 as an official in the Ministry of Labour. Here he was private secretary to the minister from 1945 to 1947, deputy secretary from 1963 to 1966, and the Permanent Secretary from 1966; the Ministry became the Department of Employment and Productivity in 1968 and the Department of Employment in 1970; he remained head, retiring in 1973. He was much concerned with industrial relations; he oversaw the creation of the Health and Safety Executive, the Advisory, Conciliation and Arbitration Service, the Training Services Agency, and the Employment Services Agency, the latter of which were merged into the Manpower Services Commission; he served as its chairman from 1974 to 1976.

Government offices
Preceded by Sir James Dunnett	Permanent Secretary of the Ministry of Labour; 1966–1968	Succeeded by himself as Permanent Secretary, Department of Employment and Productivity
Preceded by himself as Permanent Secretary, Ministry of Labour	Permanent Secretary of the Department of Employment and Productivity; 1968–1970	Succeeded by himself as Permanent Secretary, Department of Employment
Preceded by himself as Permanent Secretary, Department of Employment and Productivity	Permanent Secretary of the Department of Employment; 1970–1973	Succeeded by Sir Conrad Heron
