= Harton Academy =

Academy in South Tyneside, England

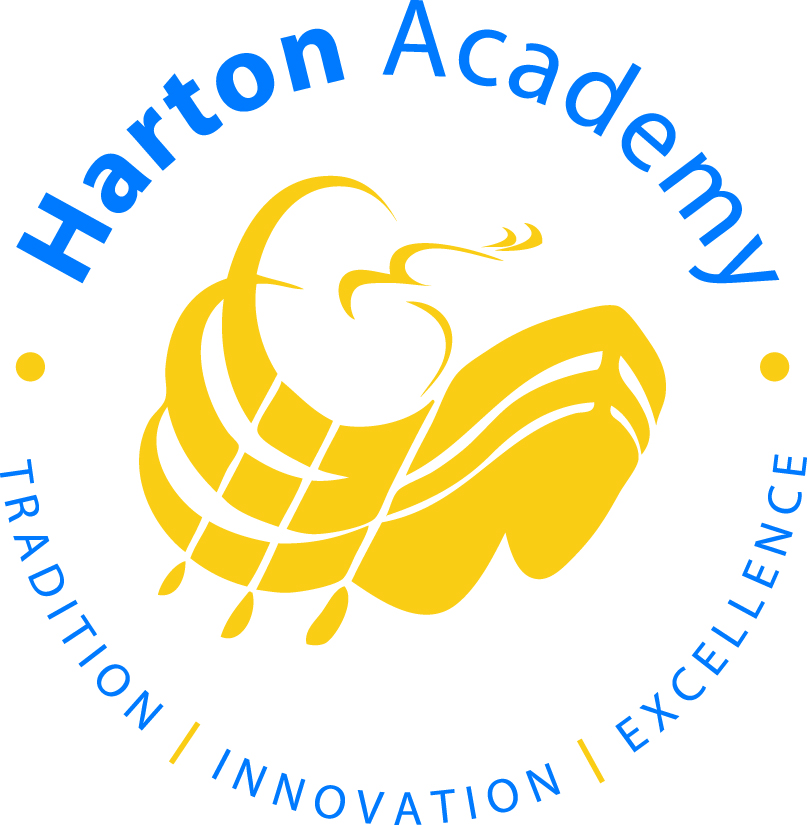
- Harton Academy Logo

Location
- Lisle Road; South Shields, South Tyneside, NE34 6DL; England; 54°58′33″N 1°24′27″W

Information
- Type: Academy
- Motto: Tradition, Innovation, Excellence
- Established: 1885 (as South Shields High School)
- Founder: The Illuminare Multi Academy Trust (created from Harton Technology College)
- Local authority: South Tyneside
- Trust: The Illuminare Multi Academy Trust
- Department for Education URN: 144204 Tables
- Ofsted: Reports
- Chair of the Board of Directors: Scott Duffy
- Chief Executive Officer (CEO) / Head Teacher: Jon Skurr
- Gender: Mixed
- Age: 11 to 18
- Enrolment: 1,662 as of April 2024
- Colours: Royal blue, yellow
- Website: harton-tc.co.uk

Harton Academy, formerly Harton Technology College or Harton Comprehensive School, is a mixed secondary and sixth form academy located in South Shields, South Tyneside, England.

In March 2022, Ofsted rated Harton Academy’s overall effectiveness as ‘requires improvement’. This was over ‘issues in record-keeping’. The leadership and management was rated as ‘requires improvement’. The quality of education, behaviour and attitudes, personal development and 6th form provision were rated as ‘good’.

In February 2024, Ofsted rated Harton Academy’s overall effectiveness as 'good'. The personal development and 6th form provision were rated as 'outstanding'. The quality of education, behaviour and attitudes and leadership and management were rated as 'good'.

== History ==
Harton was rated as 'outstanding' by Ofsted in 2006 and 2013, received 3 Government Achievement awards, featured in the 'top 50 most improved specialist schools' in the UK and identified as one of twelve outstanding schools serving disadvantaged communities.

In 2010, £25,000,000 worth of construction was completed on a new 6th form block and the refurbishment of the 1936 block. In 2015, the swimming pool was redeveloped at the cost of £400,000.

In 2011, the DfE awarded Harton with Teaching School status, allowing the academy to lead training and professional development of staff.

In 2017, Harton Technology College was granted multi-academy status by the DfE and is now known as Harton Academy, part of The Illuminare Multi Academy Trust.

In November 2023, the Illuminare Multi Academy Trust announced the appointment of a new headteacher, Jon Skurr. In January 2024, Skurr took over from the previous acting headteacher, David Amos. Skurr is the eighth Headteacher in the school's history and is the chief executive officer of the Illuminare Multi Academy Trust after Sir Ken Gibson had resigned from the role of chief executive officer on 31 August 2024

== Gallery ==
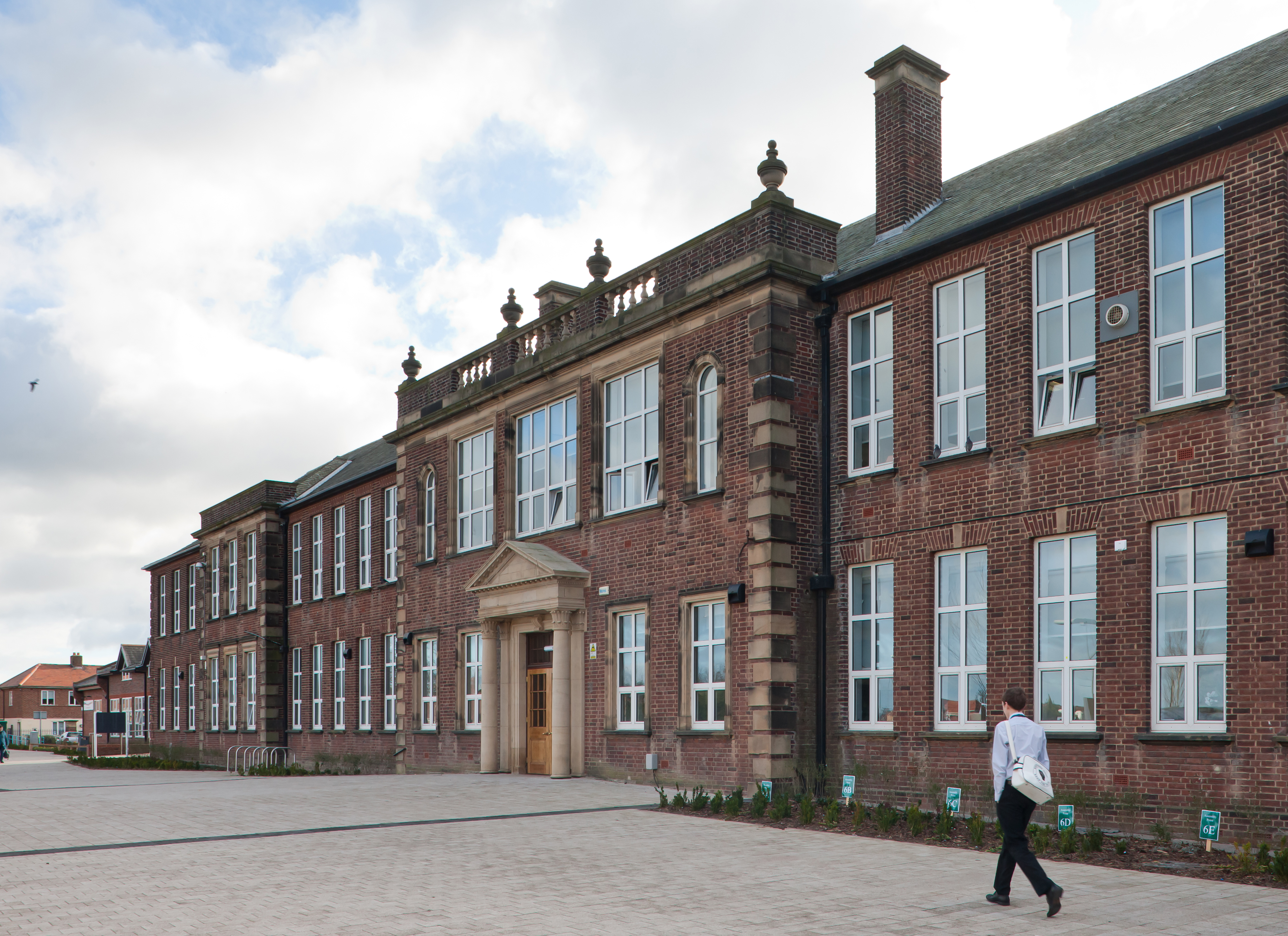
Harton Academy Old Block: built 1930s, totally renovated 2012. Houses English, humanities, ICT, MFL and art

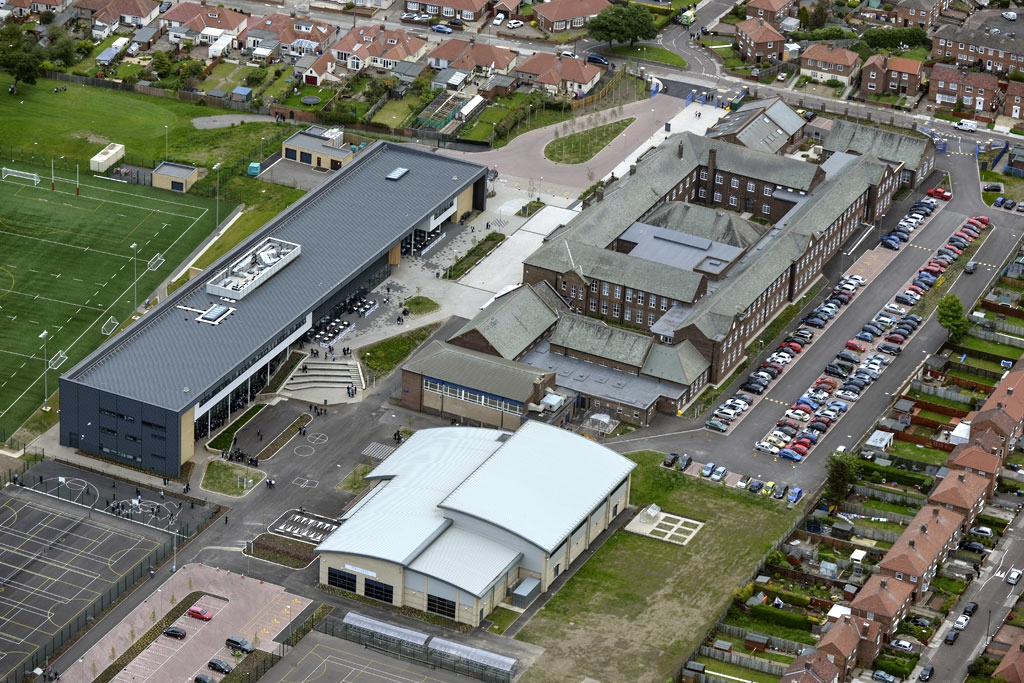
Aerial view (looking east) of Harton Academy showing new sixth-form block

== Notable former pupils ==
=== South Shields High School (1885–1936) ===
- Sir Robert Chapman, 1st Baronet, MP for Houghton-le-Spring, Territorial Army officer
- Harry Eltringham, entomologist
- Robert Cooke Fenwick, aircraft designer
- Sir Conrad Heron, civil servant
- Walter Runciman, 1st Viscount Runciman of Doxford
- Francis Scarfe, poet
- Eric Weston, judge

=== Westoe Secondary School (1890–1936) ===
- Jack Brymer, clarinettist
- James Kirkup, controversial poet

=== South Shields High School for Boys (1936–1953) ===
- John Erickson, historian
- Ron Fenton, footballer
- James Mitchell, writer of When the Boat Comes In and Callan
- David Phillips (chemist), professor of physical chemistry from 1989–2006 at Imperial College, and gave the 1987 Christmas Royal Institution lecture
- Donald Pickering, actor
- David Alan Walker, Professor of Biology from 1970–84 at the University of Sheffield
- Sir Robert Wilson (astronomer)

=== South Shields Grammar-Technical School for Boys (1953–1974) ===
- Barry Clarke, professor of civil engineering geotechnics since 2008 at the University of Leeds, and of civil engineering from 1998–2008 at Newcastle University, and president from 2012–13 of the Institution of Civil Engineers
- Robert Colls, professor of English history at the University of Leicester
- Ian Michael Davison, PLO terrorist – for which Pan Am Flight 73 was hijacked on 5 September 1986 to free him from serving life imprisonment in a Cyprus prison for the murder of three Israelis
- John Gray (philosopher), School Professor of European Thought from 1998–2007 at the LSE
- Kevin Maguire (journalist), Daily Mirror main political journalist (at the comprehensive from 1974)
- John F. Pollard, historian
- Edward Wilson – actor

=== Harton Comprehensive (1974–2001) ===
- David Wilson, rugby union player

=== Harton Technology College (2001–2017) ===
- Kane Avellano, Guinness World Record for youngest person to circumnavigate the world by motorcycle (solo and unsupported) at the age of 23 in 2017.
- Joe McElderry, The X Factor 2009 winner.
