= Kenneth Barnes (civil servant) =

English civil servant

Sir Kenneth Barnes, KCB (26 August 1922 – 16 September 2010) was an English civil servant.

He attended Accrington Grammar School and Balliol College, Oxford, before serving in the Lancashire Fusiliers during the Second World War. In 1948 he entered the Ministry of Labour. After two years at the Cabinet Office (1966–68), he was deputy secretary at the Department of Employment, before serving as Permanent Secretary from 1976 to 1982. This was a difficult period, marred by industrial disputes, the Winter of Discontent and then some of the department's core functions being separated off into the Manpower Services Commission, the Health and Safety Commission and Advisory, Conciliation and Arbitration Service. He retired in 1982.

Government offices
Preceded by Sir Conrad Heron	Permanent Secretary of the Department of Employment; 1976–1982	Succeeded by Sir Michael Quinlan
