= David A. Walker (scientist) =

British scientist and professor

David Walker FRS
- Born: David Alan Walker; 18 August 1928; Kingston upon Hull
- Died: 12 February 2012 (aged 83)
- Education: South Shields Boys' High School
- Alma mater: Durham University (BSc, PhD)
- Awards: Humboldt Research Prize (1991)
- Scientific career
- Fields: Photosynthesis
- Institutions: University of Sheffield; Newcastle University; Purdue University; University of Cambridge; Queen Mary College; Imperial College London
- Doctoral advisor: Meirion Thomas

David Alan Walker FRS (18 August 1928 – 12 February 2012) was a British scientist and professor of photosynthesis in the Department of Animal and Plant Sciences (APS) at the University of Sheffield. He authored over 200 scientific publications including several books during his lifetime.

== Education ==
Walker was born in Hull and attended South Shields Boys' High School from 1939 to 1946. After doing his national service in the Royal Naval Air Service, he studied at King's College, Newcastle, then part of the Durham University, where he received his Bachelor of Science and subsequently his PhD for research supervised by Meirion Thomas.

== Career and research ==
Walker's research interests were in photosynthesis, specifically he:

made important contributions to the understanding of photosynthesis, in particular the fixation of carbon dioxide by the biochemical transformations of the Benson–Calvin cycle in the stroma of chloroplasts of higher plants. Based on the meticulous attention to detail and technical prowess derived from his earlier training as an enzymologist, his work prompted totally new thinking about how this cycle was regulated and how it interfaced with the synthesis of ATP and NADPH in the light reactions of photosynthesis.

=== Awards and honours ===
Walker was elected a Fellow of the Royal Society (FRS) in 1976. His nomination reads:

Walker was the first to show how to obtain high rates of photosynthesis in vitro with bulk preparations of chloroplasts from a leaf. He then was able to study the process of photosynthesis in terms of the selective permeabilities of the outer membrane of a chloroplast in relation to the transfer of active components in the photosynthetic cycle. His methods were rapidly appreciated and widely used: they result in major advances for the study of the physiology of a green plant. Walker is specially distinguished for his contributions to knowledge of the enzymes concerned with carbon fixation by plants both in connection with photosynthesis and with his earlier studies on crassulacean metabolism.

In 2004, Walker received the International Society of Photosynthesis Research Communications Award "to acknowledge his outstanding efforts to communicate photosynthesis to the general public." Walker was also awarded a Doctor of Science degree from Newcastle University in recognition of his exceptional contributions of published work in his field.
