= Operational manoeuvre group =

Soviet tank corps

The operational manoeuvre group (OMG) was a Soviet Army organisational manoeuvre warfare concept created during the early 1950s to replace the cavalry mechanized group which performed the deep operations on the Eastern Front during the Second World War.

The deep operations theory developed in cooperation between the Red Army and Wehrmacht theorists in the 1930s later influenced the Blitzkrieg operations and echelon-based doctrine.

In the Soviet Army doctrine the Operational Manoeuvre Groups would be inserted to exploit a breakthrough by a Front during a potential war against NATO in Europe. In the Soviet doctrine, after the motor-rifle units, heavily supported by artillery, helicopters and close air support aircraft would have broken NATO front, the operational manoeuvre groups would be inserted to exploit the breakthrough using elements of, or whole tank armies.

At the Front level an Operational Manoeuvre Group could include two tank divisions and three to five motor-rifle divisions.
