= Conrad Heron =

English civil servant (1916–2019)

Sir Conrad Frederick Heron, KCB, OBE (21 February 1916 – 22 July 2019) was an English civil servant.

== Life ==
Born to a British father and Swedish mother, Heron was educated at South Shields High School and Trinity Hall, Cambridge, where he read French and Spanish. He entered the civil service in 1938 as an official in the Ministry of Labour, but his career was interrupted by service in the Royal Navy during the Second World War. Returning to the Ministry of Labour, he was private secretary to the minister in 1953, and went on to work in the industrial relations and overseas departments. He was appointed deputy secretary in the Ministry's successor, the Department of Employment, in 1968; after serving as deputy chairman of the Commission on Industrial Relations from 1971 to 1972, he returned to the Department of Employment as Second Permanent Secretary in 1973 and then served as Permanent Secretary from 1973 to 1976, which coincided with the Three-Day Week. In her autobiography, Shirley Williams called Heron the "peerless" leader of "a remarkable team of conciliators and arbitrators" during that period of intense industrial unrest.

Heron died on 22 July 2019 aged 103.

Government offices
Preceded by none	Second Permanent Secretary of the Department of Employment; 1973	Succeeded by none
Preceded by Sir Denis Barnes	Permanent Secretary of the Department of Employment; 1973–1976	Succeeded by Sir Kenneth Barnes
