= Ken Gibson (headteacher) =

British headteacher

Sir Ken Gibson
- Occupations: Headteacher, Teacher
- Years active: 1979–present
- Known for: Headteacher of Harton Academy, Jarrow School, Academy 360
- Children: 4
- Honours: Knighthood (2013), Honorary Doctorate from University of Sunderland (2016)

Sir Kenneth Gibson is a British former headteacher and former secondary school teacher.

== Background ==
Gibson attended East Boldon Infants School in South Tyneside, where he was taught by his mother, Helen, who was also a teacher.

== Career ==
Gibson began teaching in Kirkby in 1979 and moved to Harton Academy in 1983, where he became headteacher of the school in 2003. Under his headship, the school received an OFSTED rating of Outstanding in 2006. The school was also rated Outstanding in its subsequent OFSTED inspection in 2013.

In 2009, Gibson spoke of his pride at having Joe McElderry as an ex-pupil of his school, after McElderry went through to the last four of the X Factor.

In November 2010, Gibson became head of Jarrow School in addition to Harton Academy; he went on to successfully turn Jarrow School around, after the school's teaching was rated as inadequate. The improvement of Jarrow School took place partly because Jarrow School formed a partnership with Harton Academy as part of a national scheme. In 2012, he also became the head of Academy 360, another school, in Pennywell, after an OFSTED inspection report of the school was published.

In 2021, he moved to Executive Headteacher of the broader multi-academy trust of which Harton Academy was a part. In 2022, he lodged a formal complaint with OFSTED, saying that the inspection body's inspection of Harton Academy had a problem in the inspection process.

As of 2019, Gibson was Vice Chair of Education at Education Mutual, a provider of Staff Absence Protection for multi-academy trusts and schools.

== Honours ==
In 2013, Gibson received a knighthood for his work in education; he was the first person to have been knighted by the then Duke of Cambridge, Prince William.

In 2016, Gibson received an honorary doctorate from the University of Sunderland for his services to education, partly because he had recently considerably improved two secondary schools.

== Personal life ==
Sir Ken is married to Lady Lisa Gibson and has four children, Michael, Claire, Olivia & Luisa, plus two grandchildren, Rose and Saylor.
