= John Erickson (historian) =

British historian (1929–2002)

- Born: 17 April 1929; South Shields, England
- Died: 10 February 2002 (aged 72); Edinburgh, Scotland

Academic background
- Education: University of Cambridge

Academic work
- Institutions: University of St Andrews; University of Manchester; University of Edinburgh
- Main interests: Military history (History of warfare, World War II, Soviet Union in World War II)
- Notable works: The Road to Stalingrad and The Road to Berlin

John Erickson, FRSE, FBA, FRSA (17 April 1929 – 10 February 2002) was a British military historian and expert on the Soviet Union. His two best-known books – The Road to Stalingrad and The Road to Berlin – dealt with the Soviet response to the German invasion of the Soviet Union in World War II. During the Cold War, he was respected for his knowledge of and personal contacts in the Soviet Union, and as head of the Centre for Defence Studies at Edinburgh University in the 1980s he played a major role in brokering a rapprochement between Western and Soviet diplomats and military through the Edinburgh Conversations.

== Early life and education ==
John Erickson was born on 17 April 1929 in South Shields (then in County Durham), England. His parents were Norwegians; his father was a shipwright who had served on the convoys supporting Murmansk and Arkhangelsk after the Soviet Union joined the Allies in World War II, and an ancestor was a Swede who served in the Russian Navy on the Aurora. He was educated at South Shields High School for Boys and after service in Army Intelligence with the King's Own Scottish Borderers, at St John's College, Cambridge. In 1946–49 he studied Slavonic languages as a postgraduate at St John's, and after being recalled to active duty for the Suez Crisis, from 1956 to 1958 held a research fellowship at St Antony's College, Oxford.

== Career ==
Erickson was a lecturer in Russian and East European history at the University of St Andrews from 1958 until 1962, when he moved to the University of Manchester as a lecturer in Soviet Politics in the Department of Government. After promotion to Senior Lecturer/Reader, he left Manchester in 1967 for the University of Edinburgh. There he was first a reader in higher defence studies and became Professor of Defence Studies in 1969. In 1988 he founded the Centre for Defence Studies, which he directed until 1996. He was the Lees-Knowles lecturer at Cambridge University in 1971–72 and was a consultant to the Ministry of Defence and the United Nations, and for many years was the top advisor on the Soviet Union to NATO.

Erickson first visited the Soviet Union in 1963, as research assistant and translator to Cornelius Ryan, who was working on his 1966 book The Last Battle; he won the confidence of the Soviet commanders he interviewed. His research for his two-volume history of Stalin's war with Germany (The Road to Stalingrad, 1975, described by the historian A. J. P. Taylor as "the outstanding book on the Soviet war in any language" and The Road to Berlin, 1983) included interviewing generals on both sides. He wrote that he was surprised with the extent of personal archives (lichnye arkhivy) held by former Red Army soldiers of many ranks, and that:

there is no substitute for having the late Marshal Koniev – spectacles perched on nose – read from his own personal notebook, detailing operational orders, his own personal instructions to select commanders and his tally of Soviet casualties. And while on the subject of casualties, Marshal Koniev made it plain that, though such figurers did exist, he was not prepared on his own authority to allow certain figures to be released for publication while a number of commanders were still alive. As for such figures as were published, I was assured by expert and thoroughly professional Soviet military historians that these were reliable, which is to say that they were the product of intensive and painstaking research. The comment on them or the implications of the figures were presumably a different matter. It was all the more useful, therefore, to have the opportunity to discuss these findings with Soviet military historians, on the basis of their work with formal and informal sources.

It was only after the fall of the Soviet Union that Grigori F. Krivosheev edited and supervised Grif sekretnosti snyat: poteri vooruzhyonnyh sil SSSR v voynah, boevyh deystviyah i voennyh konfliktah (in Russian). Moscow: Voenizdat. 1993. ISBN 5-203-01400-0. on combat losses. This analysis prepared by historians based on declassified Soviet archival data represented the first comprehensive attempt to scientifically address the losses of the armed forces of the former Soviet Union during World War II.

=== Edinburgh Conversations ===
The United Kingdom formally suspended diplomatic contact with the Soviet Union after the 1979 invasion of Afghanistan. Seeking to maintain a forum of discussion in a neutral setting, Erickson arranged a series of meetings between prominent diplomatic and military leaders in Western countries, initially Scotland and later particularly the United States, and their Soviet counterparts that were held alternately in Edinburgh and Moscow from 1983 to 1989. The first Soviet delegation included the editor of Pravda and two army generals.

Although both sides approached the initial meeting with suspicion, Erickson's relationships with people in both the West and the Soviet Union and his insistence upon "academic rules" contributed to their success. Sir Michael Eliot Howard declared that "Nobody deserves more credit [than Erickson] for the ultimate dissolution of the misunderstandings that brought the Cold War to an end and enabled the peoples of Russia and their western neighbours to live in peace."

== Personal life and death ==
Erickson met his future wife, Ljubica Petrovic, when at St Antony's College, Oxford; she was reading English at the university. They married in 1957; since she was Yugoslavian, they first sought the permission of the Yugoslav cultural attaché. They had a son and a daughter. He died in Edinburgh on 10 February 2002, aged 72.

== Publications ==
- The Soviet High Command 1918-1941: A Military-Political History 1918-1941. London: St Martin's Press (Macmillan), 1962
- Panslavism, Routledge & Kegan Paul, for The Historical Association, London, 1964
- The Military-Technical Revolution. New York: Praeger, 1966 (Revised and updated papers from a symposium held at the Institute for the Study of the USSR, Munich, October 1964)
- edited with J. N. Wolfe. The Armed Services and Society. Edinburgh University Press, 1970. (Proceedings of a University of Edinburgh seminar)
- The Road to Stalingrad. Stalin's War with Germany, Volume 1. London: Weidenfeld & Nicolson / New York: Harper & Row, 1975. ISBN 0-06-011141-0. Repr. London: Cassell, 2003 ISBN 0-304-36541-6
- Soviet Military Power. London: Royal United Services Institute, 1976
- edited with E. J. Feuchtwanger. Soviet Military Power and Performance. London: Palgrave Macmillan, 1979 ISBN 0-333-22081-1
- The Road to Berlin. Stalin's War with Germany, Volume 2. 1983. Repr. London: Weidenfeld & Nicolson / New Haven and London: Yale University Press, 1999 ISBN 0-300-07813-7
- The Soviet Ground Forces: An Operational Assessment. Westview Printing, 1986 ISBN 0-89158-796-9
- with Richard Simpkin. Deep Battle: The Brainchild of Marshal Tukhachevski. Brasseys's, 1987
- edited with David Dilks. Barbarossa: The Axis and the Allies. Edinburgh University Press, 1994 (contributors include Dmitri Volkogonov, Harry Hinsley, Klaus-Jürgen Müller, Klaus Reinhardt)
- with Ljubica Erickson. The Soviet Armed Forces 1918-1992: A Research Guide to Soviet Sources. 1996
- The Russian Front. Four-part narrated televised series, Cromwell Films, 1998
  - "Barbarossa: Hitler Turns East"
  - "The Road to Stalingrad"
  - "Stalingrad to Kursk"
  - "The Battles for Berlin"
- with Ljubica Erickson. The Eastern Front in Photographs: From Barbarossa to Stalingrad and Berlin. Carlton Publishing, 2001
