= Richard Simpkin =

Brigadier Richard Evelyn Simpkin MC (1921–1986) was a British Army officer.

== Life ==
His birth was registered in the second quarter of 1921 in the St George Hanover Square registration district of central London, son of Sir Oswald Richard Arthur Simpkin (warden of Winchester College from 1932 to 1936 and second holder of the role of British Public Trustee) and Evelyn Mary Isabel Coller, who had married in Norfolk the previous year.

He was granted an emergency commission as a Second Lieutenant in the Royal Tank Regiment (RTR) on 1 March 1942 and whilst still at that rank and in that unit was awarded the Military Cross on 24 February following year. In 1947 - already a War Substantive Captain but still on his Emergency Commission - he was made a permanent Lieutenant in the post-war RTR with seniority from 25 October 1943. In the 1964 New Year Honours he was made an OBE, by which time he was a lieutenant colonel.

== Selected works ==
- Antitank: An Airmechanized Response to Armored Threats in the 90s. Oxford: Brassey's, 1982. ISBN 0-08-027036-0.
- (In association with John Erickson), Deep Battle: The Brainchild of Marshal Tukhachevskii. London: Brassey's Defence, 1987. ISBN 0-08-031193-8.
- Broadmanship: A Guide to Safe Boating on the Norfolk Broads. Cartoons by Nicholas Walmsley, illustrations by Chas Emerson. London: Barrie and Jenkins, Bayard Books, 1976. ISBN 0-214-20285-2.
- The Cruising Yachtsman's Navigator. Illustrated by John Bradley. London: S. Paul, 1978. ISBN 0-09-132830-6, ISBN 0-09-132831-4.
- Human Factors in Mechanized Warfare. Oxford: Brassey's Publishers, 1983. ISBN 0-08-028340-3.
- Race to the Swift: Thoughts on Twenty-first Century Warfare. Foreword by Donn A. Starry. London: Brassey's Defence, 1985. ISBN 0-08-031170-9.
- Red Armour: An Examination of the Soviet Mobile Force Concept. Oxford: Brassey's Defence, 1984. ISBN 0-08-028341-1.
- Seamanship for the Cruising Yachtsman. London: Paul, 1979. ISBN 0-09-138300-5.
- Tank Warfare: An Analysis of Soviet and NATO Tank Philosophy. With a foreword by Robert W. Komer and an introduction by F. M. von Senger und Etterlin. London: Brassey's Publishers, 1979. ISBN 0-904609-25-1, ISBN 0-8448-1329-X.
