= Mary Anderson =

Mary Anderson may refer to:

== Arts and entertainment ==
- Mary Anderson (actress, born 1859) (1859–1940), American stage actress
- Mary Anderson (actress, born 1897) (1897–1986), American silent film actress
- Mary Anderson (actress, born 1918) (1918–2014), American film actress
- Mary Anderson (author) (born 1939), American young adult author

== Science, academia and medicine ==
- Mary Adamson Anderson Marshall (1837–1910), Scottish physician
- Mary Anderson (gynaecologist) (1932–2006), Scottish gynaecologist
- Mary Anderson (inventor) (1869–1953), inventor of the windshield wiper blade
- Mary Annette Anderson (1871–1922), American professor, first black woman elected to Phi Beta Kappa
- Mary P. Anderson (born 1948), American hydrologist and geologist
- Mary Anderson (art historian) (1902–1973), British specialist in Christian iconography

== Other people ==
- Mary Anderson (labor leader) (1872–1964), American labor activist and advocate for women in the workplace
- Mary Anderson (New Zealand politician) (1887–1966)
- Mary Anderson (British Army officer) (1916–2006)
- Mary Anderson (business executive) (1909–2017), co-founder of REI
- Mary Anderson (decedent) (died 1996), unidentified decedent

== Fictional characters ==
- Mary Anderson (Days of Our Lives), a character on the television soap opera Days of Our Lives

== Other uses ==
- Mary Anderson (yacht), a 1933 historic yacht

== See also ==
- Mary Anderson Snodgrass (1862–1945), Scottish politician, suffragist and advocate for women's rights
- Mary Anderson Bain (1911–2006), American politician from Illinois
- Mary Lucas (1882–1952), sometimes referred to as Mary Anderson Lucas, English composer
- Marie Anderson (1916–1996), American newspaper editor
- Mary Andersson (1929–2020), Swedish author and playwright
