= David Anderson, 2nd Viscount Waverley =

The Right Honourable The Viscount Waverley

Member of the House of Lords
- Lord Temporal
- as a hereditary peer 4 January 1958 – 21 February 1990
- Preceded by: The 1st Viscount Waverley
- Succeeded by: The 3rd Viscount Waverley

Personal details
- Born: David Alastair Pearson Anderson; 18 February 1911
- Died: 21 February 1990 (aged 79)
- Spouse: Lorna (m. 1948)
- Children: 3, including John Anderson, 3rd Viscount Waverley
- Parent: John Anderson, 1st Viscount Waverley (father)
- Education: Malvern College
- Alma mater: Goethe University Frankfurt; Pembroke College, Cambridge; St Thomas's Hospital Medical School
- Occupation: Physician

Military service
- Allegiance: United Kingdom
- Branch/service: Royal Air Force
- Years of service: 1939–1945 (active)
- Rank: Squadron leader
- Unit: Medical Branch
- Battles/wars: Second World War

David Alastair Pearson Anderson, 2nd Viscount Waverley (18 February 1911 – 21 February 1990), was a British hereditary peer and physician. He trained as a physician in Germany and England, served in the Royal Air Force during the Second World War, and then specialised as a cardiologist. Having succeeded his father as Viscount Waverley in 1958, he also sat in the House of Lords where he regularly spoke on health matters and other interests of his.

== Early life and education ==
The son of John Anderson, later 1st Viscount Waverley, he was educated at Malvern College. He studied medicine at Goethe University Frankfurt and Pembroke College, Cambridge, graduating with Bachelor of Medicine, Bachelor of Surgery (MB, BChir) degrees in 1937. He completed his clinical training at St Thomas's Hospital Medical School in London.

== Career ==
From 1938 to 1939, Anderson was a junior doctor at St Thomas' Hospital, London. With the outbreak of the Second World War, he volunteered and joined the medical branch of the Royal Air Force. He was commissioned on 25 September 1939 in the rank of flying officer. He was one of the few doctors in the RAF that were also trained as pilots. He was promoted to flight lieutenant on 25 September 1940, and to squadron leader (temporary) on 1 July 1943. He was demobilized after the end of the War in 1945, and he relinquished his commission in 1956 having reached the age of 45 (at which point he was no longer obliged to remain in the reserves).

After the war, he returned to St Thomas' Hospital and developed an interest in cardiology. In 1951, he moved to the Reading Group of Hospitals where he worked as a consultant at the Royal Berkshire Hospital in Reading. He developed his own teaching unit at the hospital, and also published a number of papers on cardiac and vascular disorders. He retired in 1976.

Anderson succeeded his father as Viscount Waverley upon the latter's death on 4 January 1958. He first sat in the House of Lords on 20 May 1958, and made his maiden speech on 19 November 1959 during a debate about the hospital service.

== Personal life ==
On 13 November 1948, Anderson married Lorna Myrtle Ann Ledgerwood (1925–2013). Together they had three children: one son and two daughters. Their son, John Anderson, succeeded to his father's title as the 3rd Viscount Waverley.

== Arms ==
Coat of arms of David Anderson, 2nd Viscount Waverley
Crest A demi-lion rampant Or armed and langued Azure holding in his dexter forepaw a branch of olive Proper. Escutcheon Argent a saltire engrailed between a mullet in chief and a lotus flower in base and in each flank a crescent Gules on a chief Sable three martlets of the field. Supporters Two horses Argent crined and unguled Or. Motto Beati Pacifi (Blessed Are The Peacemakers)

Peerage of the United Kingdom
Preceded by John Anderson	Viscount Waverley; 1958–1990	Succeeded by John Anderson
