= John Anderson, 1st Viscount Waverley =

British civil servant and politician (1882–1958)

The Right Honourable The Viscount Waverley GCB OM GCSI GCIE PC PC (Ire) FRS
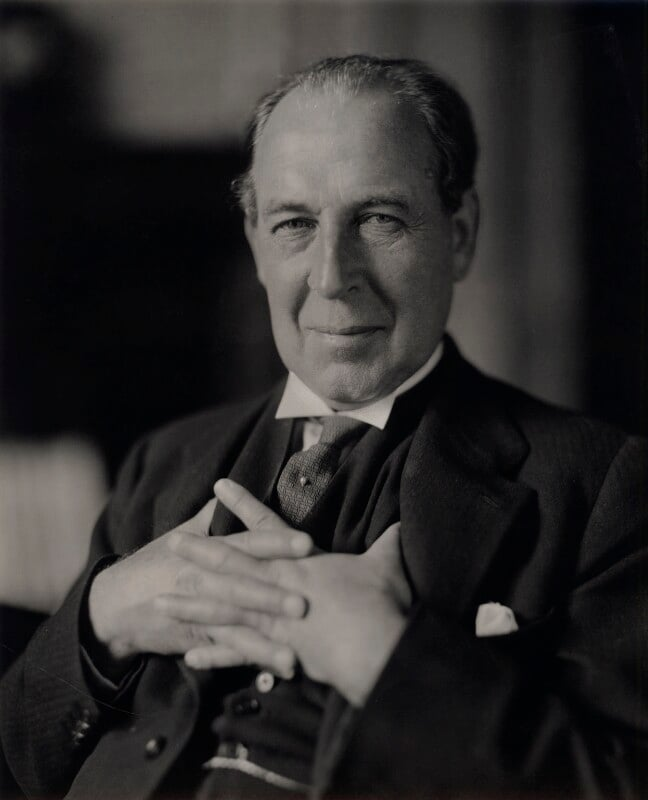
- Anderson in 1943

Chancellor of the Exchequer
- In office 24 September 1943 – 26 July 1945
- Prime Minister: Winston Churchill
- Preceded by: Kingsley Wood
- Succeeded by: Hugh Dalton

Lord President of the Council
- In office 3 October 1940 – 24 September 1943
- Prime Minister: Winston Churchill
- Preceded by: Neville Chamberlain
- Succeeded by: Clement Attlee

Home Secretary Minister of Home Security
- In office 4 September 1939 – 3 October 1940
- Prime Minister: Neville Chamberlain; Winston Churchill
- Preceded by: Samuel Hoare
- Succeeded by: Herbert Morrison

Lord Keeper of the Privy Seal
- In office 27 October 1938 – 4 September 1939
- Prime Minister: Neville Chamberlain
- Preceded by: Herbrand Sackville
- Succeeded by: Samuel Hoare

Member of the House of Lords
- Lord Temporal
- Hereditary peerage 28 January 1952 – 4 January 1958
- Succeeded by: The 2nd Viscount Waverley

Member of Parliament for Combined Scottish Universities
- In office 25 February 1938 – 23 February 1950
- Preceded by: Ramsay MacDonald
- Succeeded by: Constituency abolished

Governor of Bengal
- In office 29 March 1932 – 30 May 1937
- Preceded by: Stanley Jackson
- Succeeded by: The Lord Brabourne

Personal details
- Born: 8 July 1882 Edinburgh, Scotland
- Died: 4 January 1958 (aged 75) Lambeth, London, England
- Party: National Independent
- Children: David; Mary
- Education: University of Edinburgh; University of Leipzig

John Anderson, 1st Viscount Waverley, GCB, OM, GCSI, GCIE, PC, PC (Ire), FRS (8 July 1882 – 4 January 1958), was a Scottish civil servant and politician who is best known for his service in the War Cabinet during the Second World War, for which he was nicknamed the "Home Front Prime Minister". He served as Home Secretary, Lord President of the Council and Chancellor of the Exchequer. The Anderson shelters are named after him.

A graduate of the University of Edinburgh and the University of Leipzig where he studied the chemistry of uranium, Anderson joined the Civil Service in 1905, and worked in the West African Department of the Colonial Office. During the Great War he headed the staff of the Ministry of Shipping. He served as Under-Secretary for Ireland from 1921 to 1922 during its transition to independence, and as the Permanent Under-Secretary of State at the Home Office from 1922 to 1931 he had to deal with the General Strike of 1926. As Governor of Bengal from 1932 to 1937, he instituted social and financial reforms, and narrowly escaped an assassination attempt.

In early 1938, Anderson was elected to the House of Commons by the Scottish Universities as a National Independent Member of Parliament, and was a non-party supporter of the National Government. In October 1938 he entered Neville Chamberlain's Cabinet as Lord Privy Seal. In that capacity, he was put in charge of air raid preparations. He initiated the development of the Anderson shelter, a small sheet metal cylinder made of prefabricated pieces which could be assembled in a garden and partially buried to protect against bomb blast.

After the outbreak of the Second World War in September 1939, Anderson returned to hold the joint portfolio of Home Secretary and Minister of Home Security, a position in which he served under Winston Churchill. He retained responsibility for civil defence. In October 1940, he exchanged places with Herbert Morrison and became Lord President of the Council. In July 1941 as Lord President of the Council he was appointed as minister responsible for the British effort to build an atomic bomb, known as the Tube Alloys project. He became the Chancellor of the Exchequer in 1943 and remained in the post until the Labour Party's victory in the general election in July 1945.

Anderson left the Commons when the university constituencies were abolished at the 1950 general election. He became Chairman of the Port of London Authority in 1946 and the Royal Opera House in March the same year. He rejected an offer to join Churchill's peacetime administration when it was formed in 1951, and was created Viscount Waverley, of Westdean in the County of Sussex in 1952.

== Early life ==
John Anderson was born at his parents' home at 1 Livingstone Place, Edinburgh, on 8 July 1882, the oldest child of David Alexander Pearson Anderson, a printer and stationer, and his wife Janet Kilgour née Briglmen. He had three younger siblings: a brother, Charles, who died from meningitis in infancy, and sisters Catherine (Katie) and Janet (Nettie). The family moved to Braid Hills in May 1890. He attended George Watson's College in Edinburgh, where he was dux of the school, earning prizes for Anglo-Saxon, Old English, and Modern Languages.

In October 1899, Anderson sat the examination for students entering the University of Edinburgh, which determined order of merit for scholarships and bursaries. He was ranked eleventh, and awarded a bursary of £100 (equivalent to £11,000 in 2025). In his first year, he was ranked first in his class in mathematics and natural philosophy. In November 1900, the family moved to Eskbank. The previous owner of their new home had been an amateur astronomer and Anderson took over a room with a large telescope.

A neighbour, Andrew Mackenzie, had five daughters, and Anderson became the boyfriend of one of them, Christina (Chrissie) Mackenzie. In 1902 he took a bicycle tour of France and Switzerland, during which he wrote frequently to Chrissie. He graduated the following year with distinction in mathematics, physics and chemistry, earning a Bachelor of Science degree, and first class honours in mathematics and natural philosophy, earning a Master of Arts degree.

The Anderson, Briglmen and Mackenzie families holidayed together in summer of 1903. On 29 August they were bathing in the River Ythan when a freak wave suddenly swept Nettie Anderson and Chrissie's sister Nellie Mackenzie into deep water. Nellie was rescued but Nettie drowned. Anderson and Chrissie were on their way to join the group at the time of the accident, but it fell to him to identify the body and inform his parents.

Along with fellow Scotsmen Joseph Henry Maclagen Wedderburn, Forsyth James Wilson and William Wilson, Anderson went to the University of Leipzig in Germany, where he intended to study physical chemistry under Wilhelm Ostwald. When he arrived he found that Ostwald had abandoned chemistry, so Anderson studied under Robert Luther instead. He chose to examine the chemistry of uranium. Although Henri Becquerel had discovered in 1896 that uranium had radioactive properties, Anderson studied only its chemical properties. On his return to Edinburgh he wrote a paper on the subject, but this was not a PhD thesis.

== Civil Service career ==
=== Colonial Office ===
Although Anderson was a brilliant student, winning numerous prizes, he decided to forsake a career in science for one in the Civil Service. At the time this was the normal career path for graduates of the University of Edinburgh, and his father advised him that if he wished to marry Chrissie the Civil Service would offer greater job security. To prepare, he took an honours course in economics and political science. In July 1905, he travelled to London with a fellow candidate, Alexander Gray and sat the British civil service examination.

In those days a candidate could take tests in as many subjects as they liked, and Anderson took fourteen, earning a score of 4566 out of a possible 7500, which was the highest score that year and the second highest ever; Gray came second with a score of 4107 out of 7900. Anderson was offered the choice of joining the Home Civil Service or the Indian Civil Service. Most candidates preferred the latter, as salaries and allowances were higher, but Anderson's parents did not want him to leave Britain, and he did not want to subject Chrissie to the rigours of life in India. He therefore joined the Colonial Office as a Second Class Clerk on an annual salary of £200 (equivalent to £21,000 in 2025).

Anderson commenced work at the Colonial Office on 23 October 1905, in the West African Department. He was known in the department as "young John Anderson" to distinguish him from another John Anderson, who became the governor of the Straits Settlements. In London, Anderson shared accommodation with Gray and William Paterson, a family friend from Eskbank. On 2 April 1907, he married Chrissie at St Andrew's Church in Drumsheugh Gardens, Edinburgh; Gray was his best man and Chrissie's sister Kate and William Paterson were witnesses. The newlywed couple rented a house in Sutton, London. They had two children: David Alastair Pearson on 18 February 1911, and Mary Mackenzie on 3 February 1916.

Anderson served on Sir Kenelm Digby's 1908 Committee on Northern Nigerian Lands. This did not involve travel to Nigeria, but the following year he went to Hamburg to meet with his German counterparts at the Hamburg Colonial Institute, where his fluency in German was useful. In 1911 he was the secretary of Lord Emmott's departmental committee that recommended the introduction of a distinctive local currency in British West Africa.

=== Great War ===
In 1912, the chancellor of the exchequer, Lloyd George, introduced National Insurance, the start of the welfare state in the United Kingdom. A new government department was created to administer it, chaired by Sir Robert Morant. Anderson and Gray joined the new department. When the position of secretary of the National Insurance Commission fell vacant in May 1913, Anderson was appointed to the position over the head of many more senior civil servants. Anderson formed a good working relationship with the notoriously difficult Morant. "The trouble with young John Anderson", Morant lamented, "is that he is always so damned right."

Following the outbreak of the First World War in August 1914, Anderson was involved in securing supplies of medical and surgical implements that had hitherto been imported from the German Empire. He summoned a group of experts to analyse and produce arsphenamine, known as "606", a drug formerly sourced from Bayer in Germany. They went on to produce other substances, including aspirin. Anderson registered for service under the Derby Scheme but was placed on the Army Reserve. This did not prevent a young woman from presenting him with a white feather.

Lloyd George became the prime minister of the United Kingdom on 7 December 1916, and one of his first acts was to create a Ministry of Shipping under Sir Joseph Maclay, and Morant agreed to release Anderson to become its secretary on 8 January 1917. Although it was not his idea, Anderson recognised the value of an Allied Maritime Transport Council, and threw his support behind it. After the Armistice of 11 November 1918, the Ministry of Shipping became embroiled in a controversy over the continuance of the blockade of Germany and the shipment of relief supplies for starving civilians. In the end the Germans agreed to turn all their ships over to the Allies to carry supplies. The vessels were eventually retained as reparations. For his wartime service with the Ministry of Shipping, Anderson was made a Companion of the Order of the Bath in the 1918 New Year Honours, and was promoted to Knight Commander of the Order of the Bath in the 1919 Birthday Honours.

Anderson became a secretary of the Local Government Board in April 1919, but in July it was merged with the Health Insurance Commission to form the Ministry of Health, and Anderson became the second secretary under Morant, who had requested Anderson's appointment as his deputy. However, Anderson did not remain in that position for long either, for on 1 October 1919 he was appointed the chairman of the Board of Inland Revenue, with an annual salary of £2000 (equivalent to £89,000 in 2025) plus £300 (equivalent to £13,000 in 2025) war bonus, which was raised to £3000 (equivalent to £134,000 in 2025) plus £500 (equivalent to £22,000 in 2025) on 1 March 1920.

=== Ireland ===
Chrissie died on 9 May 1920 during an operation for cancer, leaving Anderson a widower with two young children. Nellie Mackenzie, who was training to be a nurse at St Thomas' Hospital, gave up her career to care for them. On 16 May, Anderson became Under-Secretary for Ireland. He was also the HM Treasury representative, and he became a Privy Counsellor of Ireland on 3 June 1920. The administrative arrangements were unorthodox: he did not supersede his predecessor, James Macmahon, but shared the position with him. They were answerable to the Chief Secretary for Ireland, Sir Hamar Greenwood, but as a cabinet minister, Greenwood was located in London; Field Marshal French, the Lord Lieutenant of Ireland (known as the viceroy), had wielded special executive powers in 1918 and 1919, but in 1920 reverted to the normal figurehead powers of that post. Anderson therefore wielded great executive power. He had two assistant under-secretaries, Alfred William Cope and Mark Sturgis.

Over eighty members of the Royal Irish Constabulary had been killed during the previous year, and both numbers and morale were low. Anderson oversaw a recruitment campaign among ex-servicemen in Great Britain. There were insufficient uniforms for them all, so they wore a mixture of khaki Army service dress and dark green Royal Irish Constabulary uniforms, giving rise to the nickname "Black and Tans". Major General Hugh Tudor was given a free hand to reorganise and reequip the constabulary, and facilitated cooperation between the constabulary and the military.

In the face of an insurgency, Anderson strove to avoid the appearance that Britain was engaged in a war of reconquest. He travelled in an armoured car with a police escort, and carried a revolver. He was engaged in peace talks with the Sinn Féin, but unlike Cope he was not in his element. A settlement was brokered, and on 16 January 1922, the viceroy (Viscount FitzAlan) formally handed over power to the Provisional Government. For his service in Ireland, Anderson was made an additional Knight Grand Cross of the Order of the Bath (GCB) in the 1923 New Year Honours.

=== Home Office ===
All the while Anderson was in Ireland, he was still nominally the chairman of the Board of Inland Revenue, and he returned to this role in January 1922. But not for long; in March Sir Edward Troup, the Permanent Under-Secretary of State at the Home Office, retired and Anderson was appointed to succeed him. At the time the Home office had seven divisions, each with its own Assistant Secretary: Aliens Control, Children and Probation, Crime, Factories and Shops, Channel Islands, Northern Ireland, and Police. Anderson worked an eight-hour day, from 10:15 in the morning to 18:15 each night, with an hour and a half for lunch.

Through the Northern Ireland Division, Anderson continued to be involved with Irish issues. He helped negotiate the border between the new Irish Free State and Northern Ireland in 1923. He also chaired the 1925 Committee of Imperial Defence subcommittee on air raid precautions. That year also saw Red Friday, 31 July 1925, when the government capitulated to the demands of the Miners Federation of Great Britain to provide a subsidy of £23 million (equivalent to £1,200 million in 2025) to the mining industry to maintain miners' wages and secure industrial harmony.

Appreciating that this might only temporarily stave off a major industrial dispute, the prime minister, Stanley Baldwin, appointed Anderson to the chairmanship of an inter-departmental committee to prepare for one. Each department was allocated a specific role: the Board of Trade stockpiled food and coal, the Ministry of Transport arranged for distribution, and the Home Office was responsible for keeping law and order. When the UK General Strike of 1926 commenced on 4 May 1926, Anderson had been preparing for the eventuality for nine months. He was particularly determined to remain even-handed and avoid the appearance of favouring one side over the other. When Winston Churchill suggested sending the Army to the London docks to protect the supplies of paper needed to print the British Gazette, Anderson cut him off with: "I would beg the chancellor of the exchequer to stop talking nonsense".

== Governor of Bengal ==
Being the head of a department was the pinnacle of a Civil Service career, and by November 1931, Anderson had been the permanent under-secretary for nine years, but at age 49 he was still eleven years away from retirement. At this point an unexpected offer appeared. The Secretary of State for India, Sir Samuel Hoare, and the Under-Secretary of State for India, Sir Findlater Stewart, were searching for a successor to the governor of Bengal, Sir Stanley Jackson. The province was a troubled one, and they thought of Anderson, based on his service in Ireland and during the General Strike of 1926. Jackson narrowly escaped an assassin's bullet at the University of Calcutta on 6 February 1932. On 3 March, Anderson had lunch at Buckingham Palace with King George V, who made him an additional Knight Grand Commander of the Most Eminent Order of the Indian Empire (GCIE).

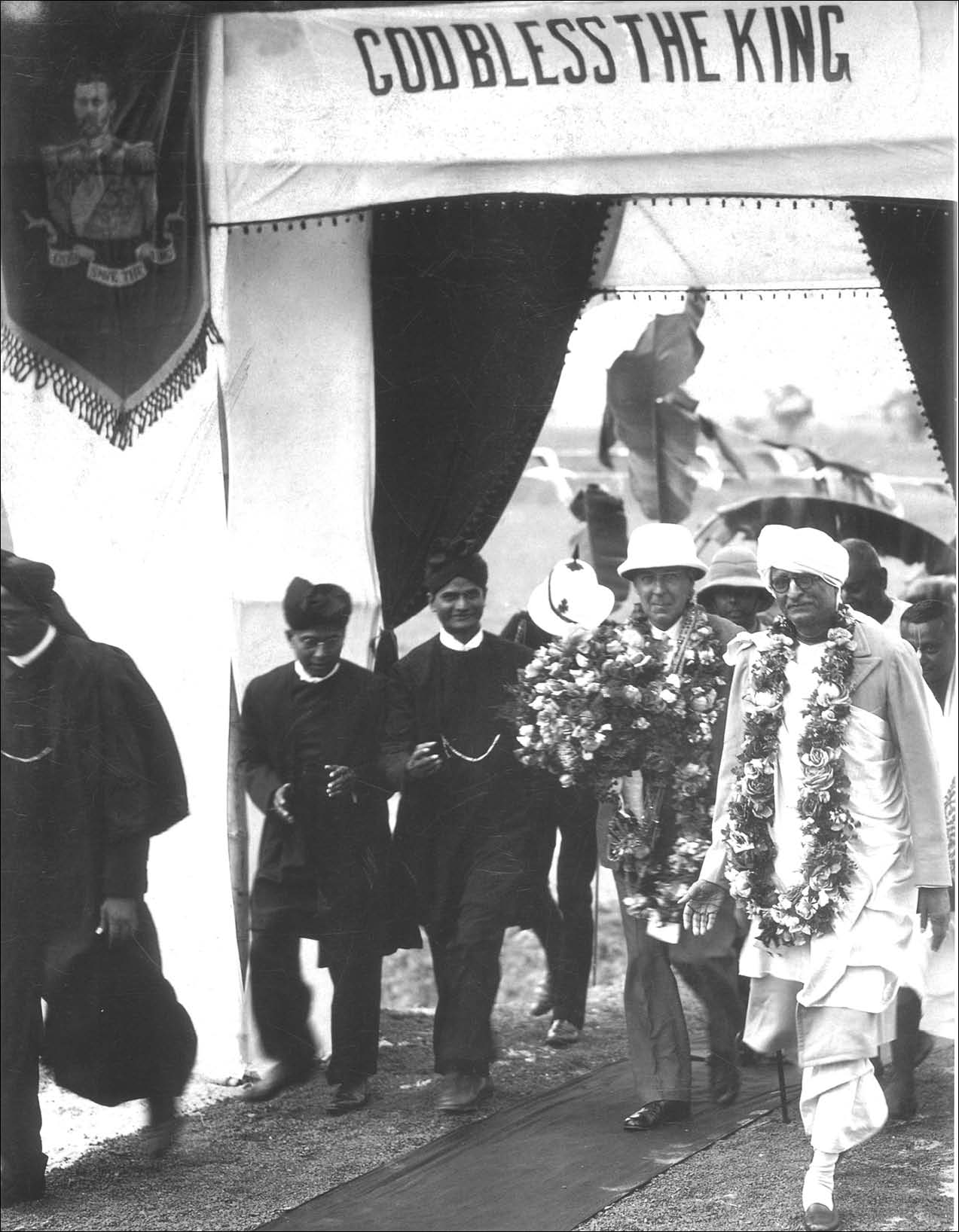
Anderson and Bhaktisiddhanta Sarasvati

Anderson sailed from England on the SS Ranpura on 10 March 1932, accompanied by William Paterson, Mary Anderson and Nellie Mackenzie; his son Alastair was studying medicine at Pembroke College, Cambridge. Anderson arrived in Calcutta on 29 March, and was greeted with a 17-gun salute. The position came with an annual salary of approximately £114,000 (equivalent to £6,714,000 in 2025), a sumptuary allowance of £25,000 (equivalent to £1,472,000 in 2025) and a grant of £100,000 (equivalent to £5,890,000 in 2025) to cover his staff's wages. In addition to his personal staff he had 120 servants, a seventy-man mounted bodyguard, and a brass band. There were cars, two special trains, a yacht and a house boat.

There were government houses in Calcutta, Darjeeling, Barrackpore and Dacca. The primary residence of the governor was in Calcutta, but when the weather became hot in April the governor and his staff would move to Darjeeling, returning when the monsoon broke in June. Each year they would spend a month in Dacca in fulfilment of a promise made when Bengal was reunited in 1911. They would then go back to Darjeeling, remaining until it became cold, and then return to Calcutta. Anderson visited all twenty-six districts of Bengal, usually travelling by train, but sometimes by river on a towed barge he named the Mary Anderson after his daughter. He regularly attended church services at St Andrew's Church in Calcutta and St Columba's Church in Darjeeling. On 26 March 1933, he was ordained as an Elder of the Church of Scotland at St Andrew's.

Anderson recognised that the root of Bengal's problems was financial. The chief source of revenue was collected under the terms of the Permanent Settlement of Bengal that had been concluded by Lord Cornwallis in 1793 and taxed landowners known as zamindars based on the value of their land. Other forms of taxation, such as income tax and export duties were collected by the central government and little was returned to Bengal. As a result, public infrastructure, such as police, education and health, had been run down. The export duty on the jute trade was particularly unfair, as it had been imposed during the Great War when the trade was booming, but by 1932 the trade was in decline due to competition from paper and cotton bags. The global Great Depression caused the prices of agricultural commodities to fall. Anderson negotiated a revision of the financial arrangements with Sir Otto Niemeyer, under which the provinces retained half of their income tax and jute duty receipts and provincial debts to the central government were cancelled.

The other major task that Anderson confronted was dealing with terrorism. Collective fines were imposed on areas that sheltered or supported terrorists, and the funds used to increase the police presence. He was aware that he was a target, but as the King's representative he continued to make public appearances, travelling in a Rolls-Royce or an open horse-drawn carriage. On 8 May 1934 a would-be assassin fired at Anderson but the bullet passed between him and Nellie Mackenzie, and the man was wrestled to the ground by Charles William Tandy-Green. A second man fired but also missed Anderson, though wounded the ankle of a teenager sitting behind the governor, and was tackled by Bhupendra Narayan Singh. Tandy-Green and Singh were awarded the Empire Gallantry Medal, which they exchanged for the George Cross in 1940. Five other members of the gang attempted to escape but were captured. The would-be assassins were sentenced to hang, but Anderson commuted the sentences of two of them. By 1935 he was described as the world's most-shot-at-man, having survived three assassination attempts. Anderson tackled the problem of what to do with détenus, individuals who had been detained without trial on suspicion of terrorism by giving them training for jobs in agriculture and manufacturing.

Anderson carried out a series of economic and social programs. He waged a campaign against water hyacinth, an invasive plant species that threatened to clog Bengal's waterways. He regulated jute production through a system of voluntarily restrictions. He established a panel that examined the problem of rural debt, and sponsored legislation to reduce the debts of farmers. He introduced compulsory primary school education. The Government of India Act 1935 was scheduled to become operative on 1 April 1937, soon after his five-year term of office was due to expire, but at the request of the Secretary of State for India, the Marquess of Zetland, and the viceroy, the Marquess of Linlithgow, Anderson agreed to a six-month extension in order to oversee the transition to self-government, but declined a request from Zetland for his term to be further extended. For his services in India, Anderson was appointed a Knight Grand Commander of the Most Exalted Order of the Star of India (GCSI) on 15 December 1937, and was made a Privy Counsellor in the 1938 New Year Honours.

== Political career ==
=== Pre-war ===
After Ireland and Bengal, the British government could find no more dangerous assignment than Palestine, and on 24 October 1937, the prime minister, Neville Chamberlain, offered Anderson the position of High Commissioner for Palestine, but he declined. Another opportunity soon presented itself. The sudden death of Ramsay MacDonald on 9 November 1937 created a casual vacancy in his Scottish Universities seat in the House of Commons, and the Unionist Party now needed to find another candidate. Sir John Graham Kerr, another member for the Scottish Universities, discussed this with Sir Kenneth Pickthorn, one of the members for Cambridge University, who suggested that Anderson might make a worthy candidate. Kerr contacted Katie Anderson, who informed him that Anderson was still en route for the UK on the liner SS Comorin.

Anderson arrived back in London on 11 December 1937. He spoke to Kerr, and agreed to stand for election as a National Government candidate without a party label. His candidacy was announced on 4 January 1938. Voting was by postal ballot, which meant that Anderson did not have to campaign but only needed to provide a statement of his political philosophy. In this he affirmed his support for the National Government and gave a qualified support for Scottish nationalism. The results were announced on 28 February; Anderson received more votes than any other candidate, and was declared the winner. He took his seat on 2 March and, after a holiday in Switzerland with Mary Anderson and Nellie Mackenzie, made his maiden speech in the House of Commons on 1 June. The occasion was a debate over the provision of funding authorised under the Air Raid Precaution Act 1937, a subject that he had previously been involved with and with which he would come to be identified.

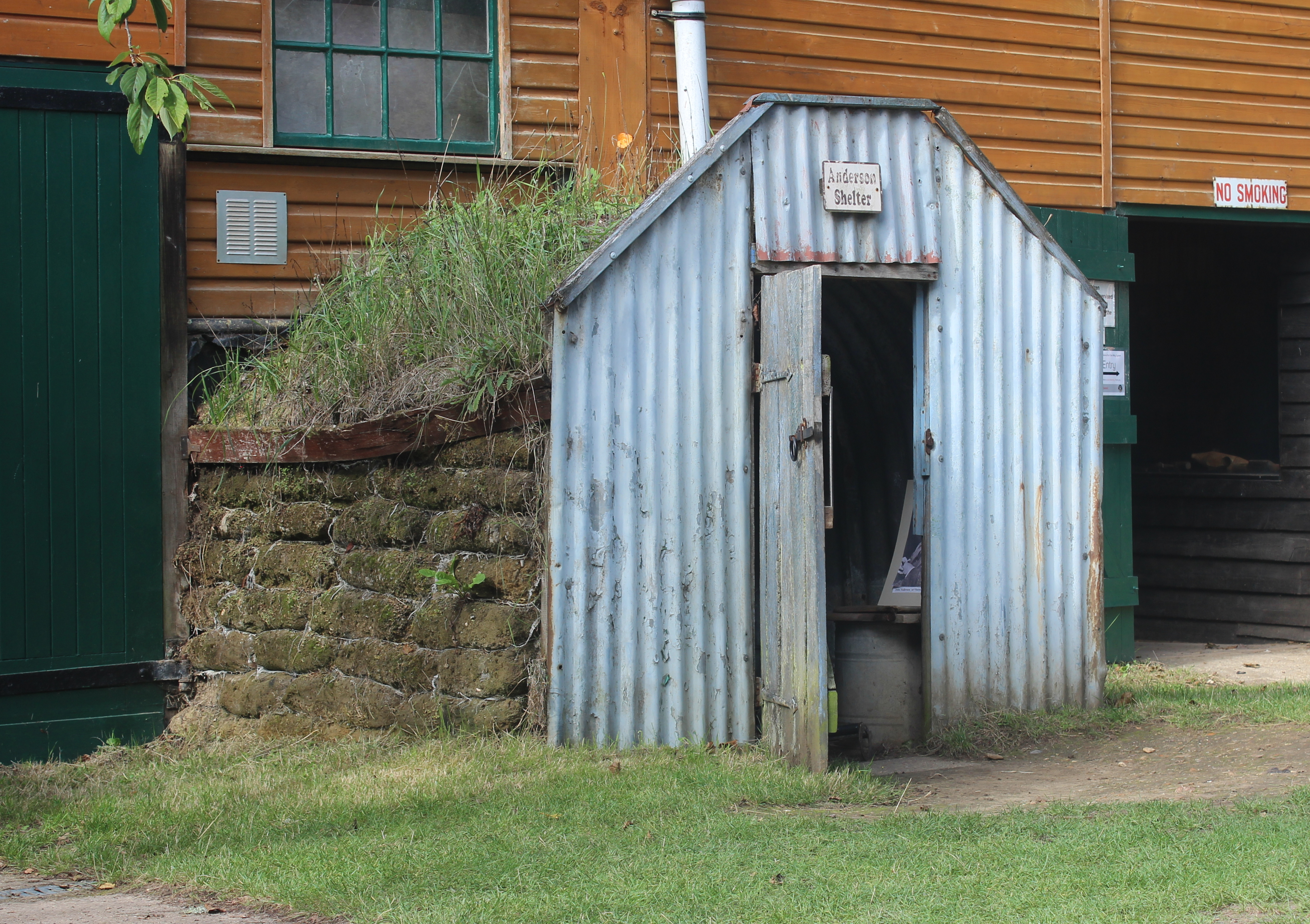
An Anderson shelter

Mary Anderson and Nellie Mackenzie had preceded Anderson to England and rented a house at 11 Chepstow Villas in Notting Hill for nine guineas a week (equivalent to £701 in 2024). Although this was a bargain, Anderson feared that his income would not be sufficient to keep up the rental payments. Before leaving Calcutta he accepted a directorship from the Midland Bank, and after his return to England he joined the boards of Vickers, Imperial Chemical Industries (ICI) and the Employers Liability Assurance Corporation. The directors' fees gave him an annual income of around £5,000 (equivalent to £371,000 in 2024). He was approached by members of the board of Imperial Airways who were seeking a new full-time chairman with an offer of more than twice that amount. However, Chamberlain stipulated that if he accepted then he would have to resign his other directorships and his seat in the House of Commons at the next general election, which was due in 1940. Anderson therefore declined the appointment. He would sometimes go horse riding in Hyde Park with Mary Anderson, but sought a more rural environment. He disposed of the house in Chepstow Villas in October and bought a 10-acre (4.0 ha) property near Merstham, Surrey, in December. During the week he lived with William Paterson and his wife.

In May 1938, Hoare, who was now the Home Secretary, appointed Anderson to chair a new Committee on Evacuation to examine the problems involved in evacuating people and industries from densely populated industrial areas in the event of a war. Over the next eight weeks the committee held twenty-five meetings and examined fifty-seven witnesses. The committee submitted its report in July. The scheme outlined in the report was implemented when the Second World War broke out in September 1939. Meanwhile, in October 1938 Anderson entered Chamberlain's ministry as Lord Privy Seal. In that capacity, he was put in charge of civil defence. He initiated the development of a type of air-raid shelter, and engaged William Paterson to design it. Paterson worked with his co-director, Oscar Carl (Karl) Kerrison, and together they devised a small sheet metal cylinder made of prefabricated pieces which could be assembled in a garden and partially buried to protect against bomb blast. It became known as the Anderson shelter. When war broke out in September 1939, some 1.5 million Anderson shelters had been delivered.

=== War time ===
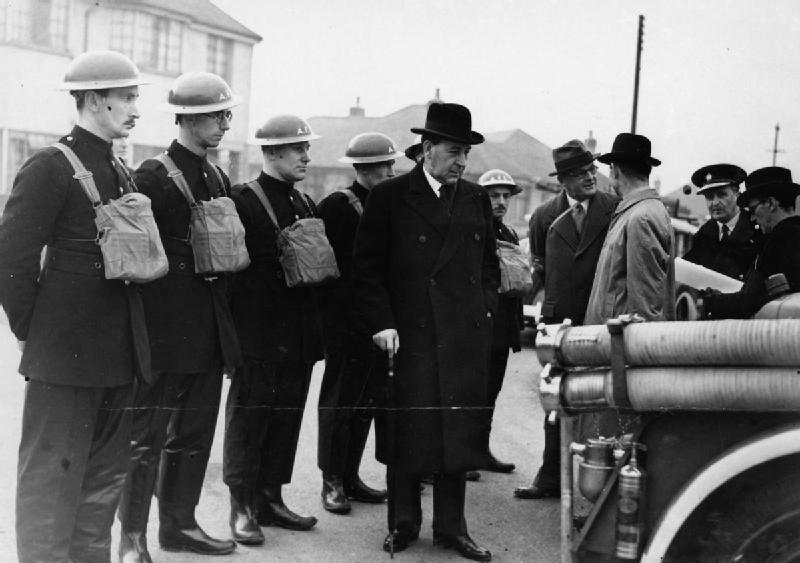
Anderson with members of the Auxiliary Fire Service in Southampton, 25 February 1940

Under a pre-arranged plan, on the outbreak of the Second World War on 3 September 1939, Anderson exchanged places with Hoare and became Home Secretary and Minister of Home Security. In the wake of the Norwegian campaign Chamberlain resigned on 10 May 1940 and Winston Churchill became the prime minister but Anderson stayed on as home secretary and minister of home security in the new coalition government. Measures taken in Ireland and Bengal were now applied to the UK. Anderson created special tribunals to assess the reliability of aliens resident in the UK. He informed the House of Commons that of the 73,353 aliens in the UK, no less than 55,457 were refugees from Nazi oppression; only 569 were interned. However, as the tide of war turned against the UK, the pressure to act against aliens grew, and on 16 May some 3,000 men whose reliability was classed as uncertain were interned, and in June 3,500 women and children were sent to the Isle of Man. Anderson then decided to intern refugees previously considered reliable, and some 8,000 were transported to Canada and Australia. One transport, the SS Arandora Star was sunk by a U-boat. Members of the Communist Party of Great Britain, the Peace Pledge Union and the British Union of Fascists were rounded up. In June 1945, there were still 1,847 persons held in detention under Defence Regulation 18B.

Once the Blitz began, the contingencies that Anderson had been preparing for were realised, and Anderson came under heavy attack in the press and the House of Commons over the issue of not providing deep shelters. On 8 October 1940, in a reshuffle precipitated by Chamberlain's resignation due to ill-health, Anderson was replaced by Herbert Morrison, a less able administrator, but a more adept politician. Anderson became Lord President of the Council and full member of the War Cabinet. The Lord President served as chairman of the Lord President's Committee. This committee acted as a central clearing house which dealt with the country's economic problems. This was vital to the smooth running of the British war economy and consequently the entire British war effort. Anderson had no staff of his own, but used that of the War Cabinet, particularly its Economic Section. As chairman of the Manpower Committee, he controlled the allocation of the most critical of wartime resources: people.

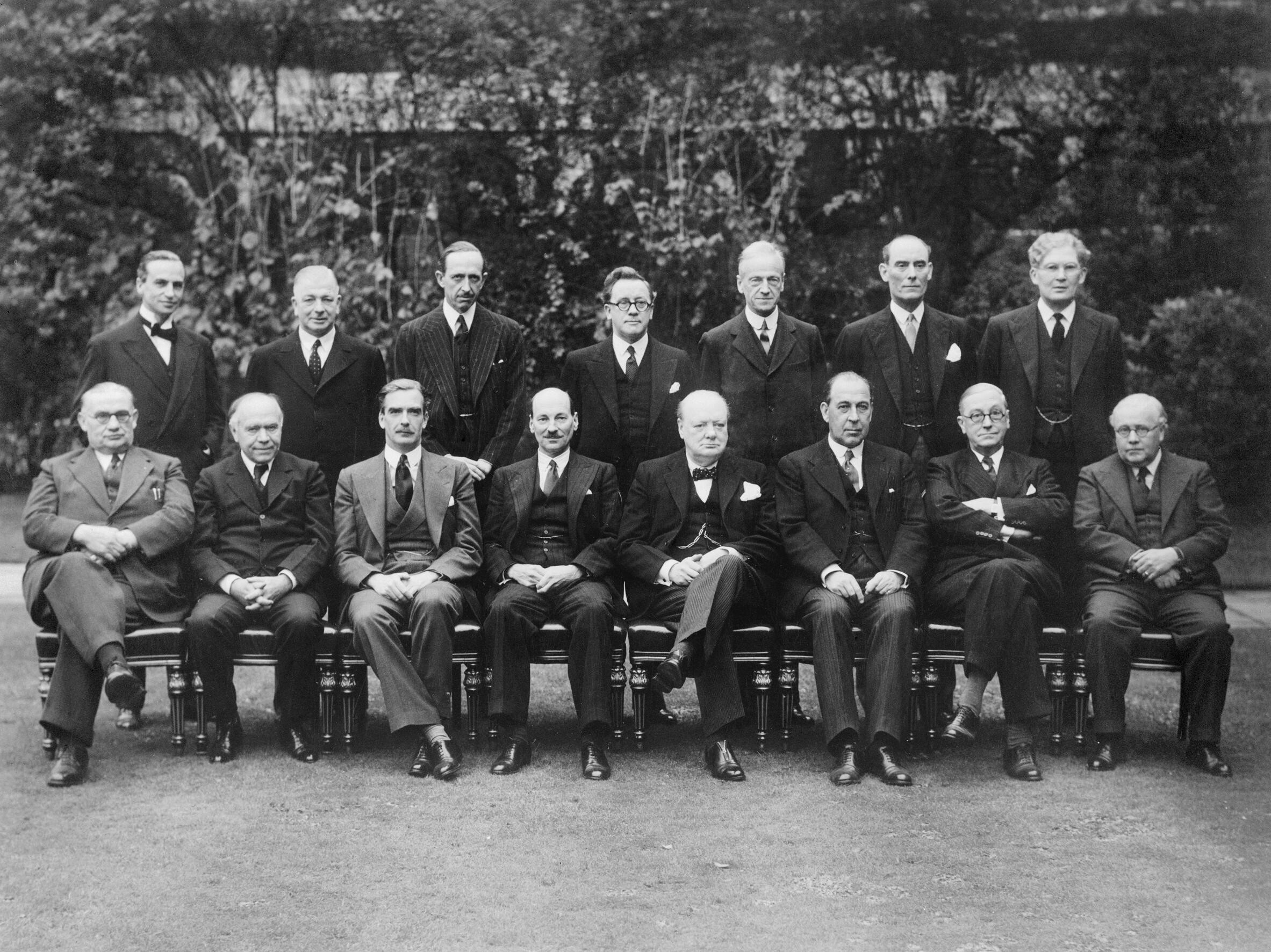
The Coalition Government 11 May 1940 – 23 May 1945. Seated, left to right, Ernest Bevin, Lord Beaverbrook, Anthony Eden, Clement Attlee, Winston Churchill, Sir John Anderson, Arthur Greenwood and Sir Kingsley Wood.

In 1941, Anderson began courting Ava Wigram, the daughter of the historian John Edward Courtenay Bodley, and the widow of Ralph Wigram, a senior civil servant who served in the British Embassy in Paris during the 1930s and died in 1936. Their only child, Charles, was born severely disabled in 1929. Anderson arranged with King George VI for himself and Ava to be married in the Chapel Royal at St James's Palace. The ceremony was officiated by Edward Woods, the Bishop of Lichfield; Alastair Anderson was the best man; and while John's father felt that he was too old to travel, Mary and Katie Anderson were there, as was William Paterson. The newlyweds spent their honeymoon at Polesden Lacey. They now owned three houses between them, so they sold them and bought the Mill House at Isfield, East Sussex in September 1942.

As Lord President of the Council, Anderson was the minister responsible for several scientific organisations, including the Department of Scientific and Industrial Research, the Agricultural Research Council and the Medical Research Council. In August 1941, Anderson became the cabinet minister responsible for the oversight of the British project to build an atomic bomb, known as the Tube Alloys project. A special section of the Department of Scientific and Industrial Research was created to manage it, under the leadership of Wallace Akers. Anderson negotiated cooperation with the United States at the Second Washington Conference in June 1942, but after the establishment of the Manhattan Project later that year cooperation broke down. In response to a request from the Americans, Anderson flew to Washington, D.C., on 1 August 1943 for negotiations with James B. Conant and Vannevar Bush. He had to reassure the Americans that Britain's interest was in winning the war, and not in profits to be made from nuclear energy afterwards. He then moved on to Canada for negotiations with officials there. The culmination of his efforts was the signing of the Quebec Agreement on 19 August 1943, which paved the way for the British contribution to the Manhattan Project. In 1945 Anderson was elected a Fellow of the Royal Society under Statute 12, which covered those who "rendered conspicuous service to the cause of science, and whose election would be of signal benefit to the Society".

Following the unexpected death on 21 September 1943 of Sir Kingsley Wood, the Chancellor of the Exchequer, Anderson was appointed to that office on 24 September. He retained responsibility for Tube Alloys, and his chairmanship of the Manpower Committee. As Chancellor, he introduced the pay-as-you-earn tax system that had been devised by Paul Chambers; the enabling legislation was to have been introduced by Wood on the day that he died. The system was very successful, and was gradually extended to all employers except the armed forces. In a written Commons answer of 12 June 1945, he announced the creation of the Arts Council of Great Britain, a successor body to the Council for the Encouragement of Music and the Arts (CEMA).

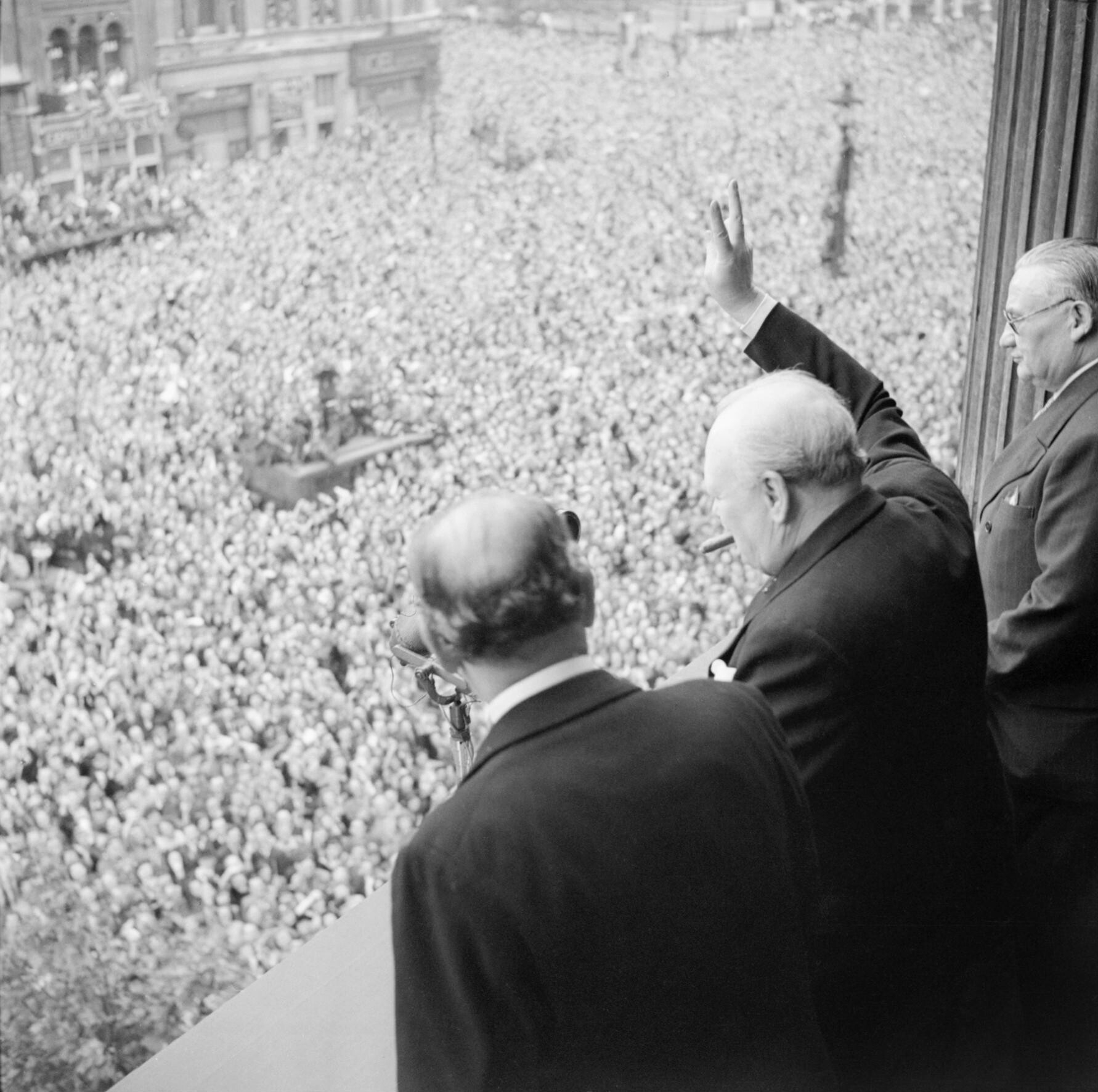
Anderson (left) with Churchill on VE Day, 8 May 1945. Ernest Bevin stands on the right.

In January 1945, Churchill wrote to King George VI to advise that should he and his second-in-command (and heir apparent) Anthony Eden die during the war, John Anderson should become Prime Minister: "it is the Prime Minister's duty to advise Your Majesty to send for Sir John Anderson in the event of the Prime Minister and the Foreign Secretary being killed." Although not a member of a political party, Churchill thought Anderson had the abilities to lead the National Government, and that an independent figure was essential to the maintenance of the coalition. During the Yalta Conference Anderson opposed the Soviet Union's demands for war reparations from Germany because of the role World War I reparations played in the Great Depression and the collapse of the Weimar Republic.

After Germany surrendered on 7 May 1945, Churchill unsuccessfully attempted to broker a continuation of the wartime coalition government until after the end of the war with Japan, which was thought at the time to be over a year away. On 23 May Churchill then submitted his resignation to the King, who called an election for 5 July. Anderson retained his role of Chancellor of the Exchequer in the Churchill caretaker ministry, and remained in the post until the Labour victory in the general election in July 1945. He was returned in his Scottish University electorate, along with Sir John Graham Kerr and Sir John Boyd Orr. On 29 June 1945, Churchill had initialled a minute from Anderson, seeking "authority to instruct our representatives on the Combined Policy Committee to give their concurrence for the use of the atomic bomb against Japan." After the bombing of Hiroshima, Anderson gave a broadcast on the BBC Home Service on 7 August 1945 in which he described the challenges and potentialities of nuclear energy in layman's terms.

=== Post-war ===
The new prime minister, Clement Attlee, appointed Anderson the chairman of the new Advisory Committee on Atomic Energy on 14 August 1945. On 9 November, he accompanied Attlee to Washington, D.C., for talks on atomic energy with President Harry S. Truman and Canadian prime minister Mackenzie King. Talks took place on the presidential yacht USS Williamsburg. The President and the two Prime Ministers were joined by Anderson; the president's chief of staff, Fleet Admiral William D. Leahy; the United States Secretary of State, James F. Byrnes; Lord Halifax; and Lester B. Pearson. They agreed to continue the Combined Policy Committee and the Combined Development Trust, and agreed to collaborate, but the Americans soon made it clear that this extended only to basic research. The 1946 McMahon Act ended all cooperation on nuclear weapons. On 7 January 1948, with the post-war British atomic weapons project in full swing and being managed by other committees, Anderson tendered his resignation from the Advisory Committee.

Anderson left the Commons on 23 February 1950 at the general election, when the university constituencies were abolished. He declined offers from the Ulster Unionist Party to contest a safe seat in Northern Ireland, and from Churchill to contest the blue-ribbon Conservative seat of East Surrey. At the Boat Race 1951, Attlee tried to get Ava to persuade Anderson to accept a peerage, but Anderson still hoped that university constituencies would be restored and he could contest his old seat. He rejected an offer to become the Chancellor of the Duchy of Lancaster in Churchill's peacetime administration when it was formed in October 1951; Churchill had wanted Anderson to be an "overlord" of the Exchequer, Board of Trade and Supply, but he declined thinking such an arrangement inappropriate in peacetime. He was created Viscount Waverley, of Westdean in the County of Sussex, on 29 January 1952.

Meanwhile, Anderson had become Chairman of the Port of London Authority in 1946 and Chairman of the Royal Opera House in March the same year. He also became a director of the Canadian Pacific Railway and the Hudson's Bay Company. He resumed his membership of the boards of ICI, Vickers and the Employers' Life Assurance Corporation that he had given up when he became a minister, but not the Midland Bank, which in those days would have been considered improper for a former Chancellor of the Exchequer. The Port of London Authority chairman had often been part time and unpaid in the past, but now that a full-time role was called for Anderson insisted on being paid, and was given an annual salary of £7,500 (equivalent to £272,000 in 2025). The job was an immense one, as the port had been badly damaged by bombing during the war, and a major reconstruction effort was called for. Ava used the Port Authority's yacht, the St Katharine, to hold party cruises on the river around the London Docks for special guests, and invitations were highly sought after.

In addition to British honours and awards, Anderson received many awards from other countries. These included being made a Grand Officer of the Legion of Honour by France; a Commander of the Order of the Crown of Italy; the Knight Grand Cross of the Order of St Olav of Norway, the Order of the North Star of Sweden, of the Military Order of Christ of Portugal, and the Order of the Dannebrog of Denmark. He was awarded an honorary D.C.L. by Oxford University, and honorary D.Sc. by McGill University, and honorary LL.D. by the University of Edinburgh, University of Aberdeen, University of Cambridge, University of St Andrews, University of Liverpool, University of Leeds, University of Sheffield and the University of London, and was an Honorary Fellow of Gonville and Caius College, Cambridge. It was intended that he should be awarded the Order of Merit in the 1958 New Year Honours but an operation on 17 August 1957 revealed that he had pancreatic cancer, and it was feared he would not live long enough to receive it, so Queen Elizabeth II made an immediate award, which was conferred at his hospital bed. He died on 4 January 1958 in St Thomas' Hospital, and was buried in the churchyard in Westdean.

== See also ==
- Liversidge v. Anderson

== Notes ==
Government offices
Preceded by Sir Warren Fisher	Chairman, Board of Inland Revenue; 1919–1922	Succeeded by Sir Richard Hopkins
Preceded by James Macmahon; Macmahon also remained Joint Under-Secretary	Joint Permanent Under-Secretary to the Lord Lieutenant of Ireland; 1920–1922	Office abolished
Preceded by Sir Edward Troup	Permanent Under-Secretary of State at the Home Office; 1922–1932	Succeeded by Sir Russell Scott
Preceded by Sir Stanley Jackson	Governor of Bengal; 1932–1937	Succeeded by The Lord Brabourne
Parliament of the United Kingdom
Preceded by Ramsay MacDonald	Member of Parliament for Combined Scottish Universities; 1938–1950	Constituency abolished
Political offices
Preceded by The Earl De La Warr	Lord Privy Seal; 1938–1939	Succeeded by Sir Samuel Hoare
Preceded by Sir Samuel Hoare	Home Secretary; 1939–1940	Succeeded by Herbert Morrison
New office	Minister of Home Security; 1939–1940	Succeeded by Herbert Morrison
Preceded by Neville Chamberlain	Lord President of the Council; 1940–1943	Succeeded by Clement Attlee
Preceded by Sir Kingsley Wood	Chancellor of the Exchequer; 1943–1945	Succeeded by Hugh Dalton
Peerage of the United Kingdom
New creation	Viscount Waverley; 1952–1958	Succeeded by David Anderson
