= Viscount Waverley =

Viscountcy in the Peerage of the United Kingdom

Viscount Waverley, of Westdean in the County of Sussex, is a title in the Peerage of the United Kingdom. It was created on 28 January 1952 for the civil servant and politician Sir John Anderson, who served variously as Governor of Bengal, Member of Parliament, Lord Privy Seal, Home Secretary, Lord President of the Council and Chancellor of the Exchequer. As of 2017 the title is held by his grandson, the third Viscount, who succeeded his father in 1990. He was one of the ninety elected hereditary peers that remained in the House of Lords after the passing of the House of Lords Act 1999, and sat as a cross-bencher. Lord Waverley retired from the House of Lords on 23 June 2025.

== Viscount Waverley (1952) ==
- John Anderson, 1st Viscount Waverley (1882–1958)
- David Alastair Pearson Anderson, 2nd Viscount Waverley (1911–1990)
- John Desmond Forbes Anderson, 3rd Viscount Waverley (born 1949)

The heir apparent is the present holder's son, the Hon. Forbes Alastair Rupert Anderson (born 1996).

== Arms ==
Coat of arms of Viscount Waverley
Crest A demi-lion rampant Or armed and langued Azure holding in his dexter forepaw a branch of olive Proper. Escutcheon Argent a saltire engrailed between a mullet in chief and a lotus flower in base and in each flank a crescent Gules on a chief Sable three martlets of the field. Supporters Two horses Argent crined and unguled Or. Motto Beati Pacifi (Blessed Are The Peacemakers)
