= John Anderson, 3rd Viscount Waverley =

British Viscount

The Right Honourable The Viscount Waverley
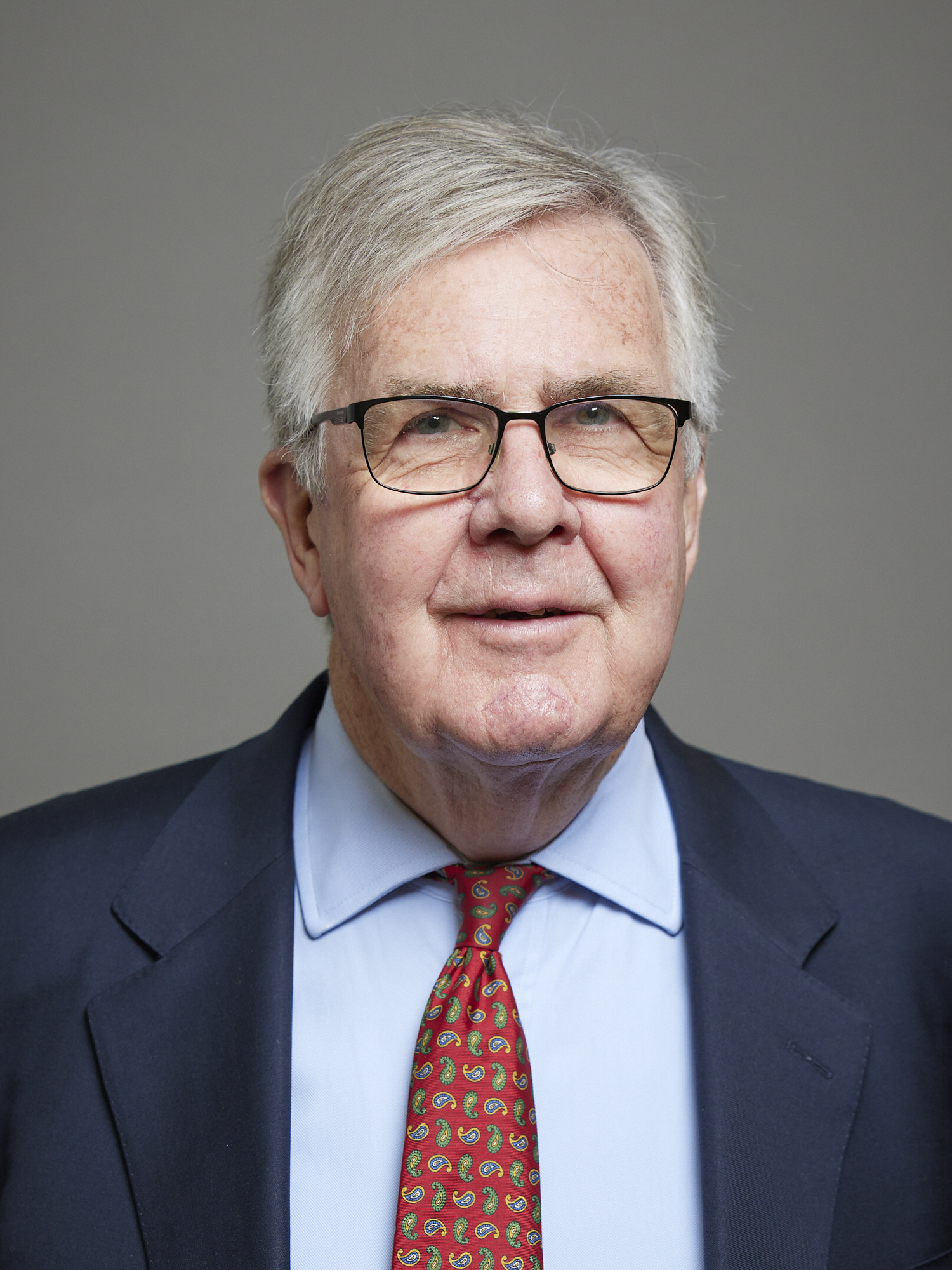
- Official portrait, 2023

Member of the House of Lords
- Lord Temporal
- Hereditary peerage 29 June 1990 – 11 November 1999
- Preceded by: The 2nd Viscount Waverley
- Succeeded by: Seat abolished
- Elected Hereditary Peer; 11 November 1999 – 23 June 2025
- Election: 1999
- Preceded by: Seat established
- Succeeded by: Seat abolished

Personal details
- Born: 31 October 1949 (age 76)
- Party: Crossbencher
- Education: Malvern College

John Desmond Forbes Anderson, 3rd Viscount Waverley (born 31 October 1949), is a British hereditary peer.

The son of the 2nd Viscount Waverley and his wife Lorna Ledgerwood, he was educated at Malvern College.

Lord Waverley was first married to Anne Suzette Davidson in 1969. He then married Ursula Helen Barrow in 1994.

He succeeded to his father's titles in 1990. He was one of the ninety hereditary peers in the House of Lords elected to remain after the passing of the House of Lords Act 1999, sitting as a crossbencher until his retirement on 23 June 2025.

He takes a particular interest in the central Asian republics of Kazakhstan, Uzbekistan, Turkmenistan, Kyrgyzstan, and Tajikistan, and works as a consultant to the Middle East Consolidated Contractors Company (CCC). He has been honoured with a Yoruba Chieftaincy in Nigeria and received State decorations from Kazakhstan, Kyrgyzstan and Colombia.

Lord Waverley has set up the website Parliament Revealed, to explain the workings of the UK Parliament.

Lord Waverley retired from the House of Lords on 23 June 2025.

== Arms ==
Coat of arms of John Anderson, 3rd Viscount Waverley
Crest A demi-lion rampant Or armed and langued Azure holding in his dexter forepaw a branch of olive Proper. Escutcheon Argent a saltire engrailed between a mullet in chief and a lotus flower in base and in each flank a crescent Gules on a chief Sable three martlets of the field. Supporters Two horses Argent crined and unguled Or. Motto Beati Pacifi (Blessed Are The Peacemakers)

== Notes ==
Peerage of the United Kingdom
Preceded by David Anderson	Viscount Waverley; 1990–present Member of the House of Lords (1990–1999)	Incumbent; Heir apparent: Hon. Forbes Anderson
Parliament of the United Kingdom
New office created by the House of Lords Act 1999	Elected hereditary peer to the House of Lords under the House of Lords Act 1999; 1999–2025	Vacant
