= Mary Anderson (author) =

American author (born 1939)

- Born: Mary Nell Quirk; January 20, 1939 (age 87); New York City, New York, U.S.
- Occupation: Writer/novelist
- Writing career
- Genre: Young adult
- Notable work: Matilda's Masterpiece

Mary Anderson (born January 20, 1939) is an American author of mystery novels for children and young adults, the majority published by Atheneum Books of New York City.

== Bibliography ==
- There's a pizza back in Cleveland (1972; with Hope Campbell), Four Winds Press
- Emma's Search for Something (1973), Atheneum Books
- Matilda Investigates (1973), Atheneum Books
- Just the two of them (1974), Atheneum Books
- I'm nobody! Who are you? (1974), Atheneum Books
- F*T*C Superstar (1976), Atheneum Books
- Matilda's Masterpiece (1977), Atheneum Books Soft Cover Title: "The Mystery of the Missing Painting"
- Step on a Crack (1978), Atheneum Books
- F*T*C* and Company (1979; with Don Sibley), Atheneum Books
- Contributor, THE NEW YORK KIDS BOOK, 1979, Doubleday
- THE ORPHAN PRINCESS, 1978, (LIBRETTO) TheatreWorks, (Formerly P.A.R.T)
- The Rise & Fall of a Teen-age Wacko (1980), Atheneum Books
- Forever, Ahbra (1981), Atheneum Books
- You can't get there from Here (1982), Atheneum Books
- R.I.S.K. (1983), Atheneum Books
- That's not my style (1983), Atheneum Books
- Tune in Tomorrow (1984), Atheneum Books
- Catch Me, I'm Falling in Love (1985), Delacorte Press
- Who says nobody's perfect? (1987), Delacorte Press
- Do you call that a dream date? (1987), Delacorte Press
- Mostly Ghosts (series; 1987), Yearling Books
  - The Haunting of Hillcrest (1987)
  - The Leipzig Vampire (1987)
  - Terror Under the Tent (1987)
  - The Three Spirits of Vandermeer Manor (1987)
- Mostly Monsters (series, 1989) Yearling Books
  - The Hairy Beast in the Woods (1989)
  - The Missing Movie Creature (1989)
  - The Terrible Thing in the Bottle (1989)
  - The Curse of the Demon (1989)
- Suzy's Secret Snoop Society (1991), Avon Books
- The Unsinkable Molly Malone (1991)
- EVERYDAY WOMEN, New Jersey Repertory Company, July 1999 ((The Cultural Arts Center, Brick Township))
- JUNE ROBOT CLEANS UP, 2004, ((Macmillan McGraw- Hill)) Grade One Reader
- THE SHARERS, (author title under M.N. QUIRK) ((Triumph Publishing, a division of Mama’s House Press, 2019)) BIOGRAPHICAL LISTING: SOMETHING ABOUT THE AUTHOR, VOLUME 23 (GALE publishing)
