= Mary Anderson (British Army officer) =

British Army officer

Dame Mary Anderson
- Born: Mary Mackenzie Anderson; 3 February 1916; Epsom, Surrey
- Died: 18 June 2006 (aged 90); Hampshire, England
- Occupation: Army Officer
- Spouse: Frithjøf Pihl (m. 1973; died 1988)

Brigadier Dame Mary Mackenzie Anderson DBE (3 February 1916 – 18 June 2006) was a British Army officer. Having served in the Auxiliary Territorial Service during the Second World War, she then rose through the ranks of the Women's Royal Army Corps (WRAC) and served as director of WRAC from 1967 to 1970.

== Early life ==
Anderson was the younger child and only daughter of Sir John Anderson, later the 1st Viscount Waverley, who was Home Secretary and Minister for Home Security at the outbreak of WWII, and his wife, Christina (née Mackenzie). She was educated at Sutton High School and the Villa Brillantmont in Lausanne.

== Military service ==
She served with the Women's Auxiliary Territorial Service, the forerunner of the Women's Royal Army Corps during World War II. She joined the ATS in 1941 and was commissioned the following year. By 1946, she was ATS Group Commander Highland District based in Perth and, discovering she enjoyed service life, decided to make it her career. On leaving Perth in 1946, she undertook her first speciality work within the WRAC as assistant provost marshal (WRAC) responsible for WRAC disciplinary matters for the British Army of the Rhine and in the UK.

She was promoted to colonel in 1963, and then served as commandant of the WRAC (Training) Centre from 1964 to 1967. In 1967, she was promoted to brigadier and appointed director of the Women's Royal Army Corps.

Upon her retirement she was appointed a Dame Commander of the Order of the British Empire in the 1970 New Year Honours.

== Marriage ==
She married Frithjøf Pihl, a member of the Norwegian Resistance, on 8 July 1973. He died in 1988.
