= Mary Anderson (art historian) =

British art historian

Mary Désirée Anderson (1902–1973) was a British specialist in Christian iconography and early Church drama, as well as a leading expert on English medieval woodcarving. She was a poet in her own right. Photographs contributed by Maisie Anderson to the Conway Library are currently being digitised by the Courtauld Institute of Art, as part of the Courtauld Connects project. She published under the name M. D. Anderson.

== Personal life ==
Anderson married Sir George Trenchard Cox (1905–1995) in 1935, a fellow art historian, and museum director (Birmingham Museum and Art Gallery and the V&A). Her parents were British physiologist and academic Hugh Kerr Anderson (1865–1928) and Jessie Mina Innes (d. 1946). Anderson died in 1973.

== Archive ==
Her memoirs, diaries (1918–1933), sketchbook, letters, poems and pamphlets, are held at Gonville and Caius College Archive, Cambridge, having been donated by her husband, Sir George Trenchard Cox. Her reminiscences of life at Cambridge feature in A History of the University of Cambridge: Volume 4 (1870–1990), edited by Christopher Brooke, Christopher N. L. Brooke, Damian Riehl Leader, Victor Morgan, and Peter Searb.

== Selected works ==
=== Academic writing ===
- The Medieval Carver,1935, Cambridge U. P.
- Animal Carvings in British Churches, 1938, Cambridge U. P.
- Design for a journey, 1940, Cambridge U. P.
- British Women at War, 1941, John Murray; Pilot Press
- Looking for history in British Churches, 1951, John Murray
- Choir Stalls of Lincoln Minster, 1951, Friends of Lincoln Cathedral
- Misericords. Medieval life in English woodcarving. 1954, Harmondsworth: Penguin Books
- The Imagery of British Churches, 1955, John Murray
- Drama and Imagery in English Medieval Churches, 1963, Cambridge U.P.
- Grey Sisters, 1972, Chatto and Windus
- A saint at stake: the strange death of William of Norwich 1144, 1964, Faber
- History by the Highway, 1967, Faber & Faber, 1967
- The Changeling Niobid, 1969, Chatto & Windus
- History and imagery in British churches, 1971, J. Murray

=== Poetry ===
- Bow Bells are Silent [poems], 1943, Williams & Norgate
- Her poem 'The Black-Out' published in Peace and War: A Collection of Poems, edited by Michael Harrison, Christopher Stuart-Clark (1989), p. 97
- Her poem 'The Time of Dunkirk' in Shadows of War, British Women's Poetry of the Second World War, ed. Anne Powell (Sutton Publishing, 1999), p. 41
