= Mary Anderson (yacht) =

Mary Anderson was a luxury yacht built in 1933. It was the official yacht of the governor of Bengal and later the President of Bangladesh. More recently, it was converted into a floating restaurant before burning down in 2014.

== History ==
Mary Anderson was built in 1933 by the Calcutta Shipyard. It was named after the daughter of John Anderson, 1st Viscount Waverley, then the governor of Bengal. It was built at a cost of Rs 1,24,702.00 for the Governor of Bengal. After the partition of India in 1947, the yacht became the official yacht of the Governor of East Bengal. Following the Independence of Bangladesh in 1971, the yacht became the official yacht of the President of Bangladesh. In 1978, the Ziaur Rahman donated the yacht to the Bangladesh Parjatan Corporation, a state owned tourism corporation. It was inaugurated by Senior Minister Mashiur Rahman Jadu Miah in 1978.

Bangladesh Parjatan Corporation eventually converted the yacht into a floating restaurant, which was opened on 24 September 1978. The restaurant proved to be popular among tourists. It had a seating capacity of 72 people and dining capacity of 24 people. It was the first floating restaurant in Bangladesh. The government of Bangladesh announced plans to renovate it in 2004. The VIP jetty of Bangladesh Inland Water Transport Corporation was called the Mary Anderson Jetty. It was based in Buriganga River at Pagla Jetty in Narayanganj District. On 16 October 2014, the vessel burned down after a fire originated in the bar on the lower deck. On 12 February 2017, the Bangladesh Parjatan Corporation launched the Sonargaon Bhasoman Restaurant and Bar, which took the place of Mary Anderson.
