= 1969 New Year Honours =

British royal recognitions

The New Year Honours 1969 were appointments in many of the Commonwealth realms of Queen Elizabeth II to various orders and honours to reward and highlight good works by citizens of those countries. They were announced in supplements to the London Gazette of 20 December 1968 to celebrate the year passed and mark the beginning of 1969. At this time honours for Australians were awarded both in the United Kingdom honours, on the advice of the premiers of Australian states, and also in a separate Australia honours list.

The recipients of honours are displayed here as they were styled before their new honour, and arranged by honour, with classes (Knight, Knight Grand Cross, etc.) and then divisions (Military, Civil, etc.) as appropriate.

== United Kingdom and Commonwealth ==
=== Life Peer ===
Barons

- Professor Patrick Maynard Stuart Blackett, OM, CH. President of the Royal Society since 1965.
- Sir Learie Nicholas Constantine, MBE. High Commissioner in London for Trinidad and Tobago, 1962–1964. Member, Sports Council since 1965. Member, Race Relations Board since 1966. A Governor, British Broadcasting Corporation since 1968.
- Sir Joseph John Saville Garner, GCMG, lately Head of HM Diplomatic Service.
- Sir Donald Gresham Stokes, TD, DL. Chairman and Managing Director, British Leyland Motor Corporation Ltd.

=== Privy Councillor ===
- Harold Davies, MP. Member of Parliament for the Leek Division of Staffordshire since 1945. Joint Parliamentary Secretary, Ministry of Pensions and National Insurance, October 1964–August 1966. Joint Parliamentary Secretary, Ministry of Social Security, August 1966–January 1967.
- The Right Honourable Hervey, Baron Rhodes, DFC. Parliamentary Secretary, Board of Trade, 1950–1951 and 1964–1967. Lord Lieutenant of Lancaster.
- Stephen Swingler, MP. Member of Parliament for Newcastle-under-Lyme since October 1951. Joint Parliamentary Secretary, Ministry of Transport, October 1964–August 1967. Minister of State, Ministry of Transport, August 1967–October 1968. Minister of State, Department of Health and Social Security since November 1968.

=== Knight Bachelor ===
- David Thurlow Barritt, Chairman, Simon Engineering Ltd. For services to Export.
- Derman Guy Christopherson, OBE, Vice Chancellor, University of Durham.
- Christopher Sydney Cockerell, CBE, Consultant, Hovercraft Development Ltd.
- John Edward Cohen, Chairman, Tesco Stores (Holdings) Ltd.
- Alderman Major William Duncan Geddis, Lord Mayor of Belfast.
- John Hinshelwood Gibson, CB, QC, Legal Secretary and Parliamentary Draftsman, Lord Advocate's Department.
- Lew Grade, Deputy Chairman and Chief Executive, Associated Television Corporation Ltd. For services to Export.
- Robert Ernest Hardingham, CMG, OBE, Chief Executive, Air Registration Board.
- Frederick Hayday, CBE, National Industrial Officer, National Union of General and Municipal Workers. Chairman, International Committee, Trades Union Congress. For services to the Trade Union Movement.
- Alderman John Michael Clifford Higgs, DL, Chairman, Worcestershire County Council.
- James William Howie, MC, FRCP, Medical Director, Public Health Laboratory Service.
- Douglas Percy Iggulden, CBE, DSO, TD, Chief Valuer, Board of Inland Revenue.
- Bernard Katz, Professor of Biophysics, University of London.
- Robert McErlean Kelly. For services to Scottish Football.
- Alderman James Reginald Lyons, JP, Lord Mayor of Cardiff.
- John Frederick Mallabar, Chairman, Harland & Wolff Ltd. For services to Export.
- Morien Bedford Morgan, CB, Controller of Guided Weapons and Electronics, Ministry of Technology.
- Max Rayne. For services to the Arts.
- Hubert Shirley-Smith, CBE, lately President, Institution of Civil Engineers.
- Alderman Peter Malden Studd, Sheriff, City of London.
- Frederick Neil Sutherland, CBE, Chairman, Marconi Company Ltd. For services to Export.
- Michael Milne-Watson, CBE, Deputy Chairman, British Steel Corporation.
- Stephen John Watson, CBE, lately Professor of Agriculture and Rural Economy, University of Edinburgh.
- Charles Percival Law Whishaw, Senior Partner, Freshfields, Solicitors.
- Michael Francis Addison Woodruff, MS, FRCS, Professor of Surgical Science, University of Edinburgh.

Diplomatic Service and Overseas List

- Jocelyn Bodilly, VRD, Chief Justice, Western Pacific High Court.
- Kwan Cho-yiu, CBE, JP. For voluntary public service in Hong Kong.
- Dermod Art Murphy, CMG, OBE, Governor and Commander-in-Chief, Saint Helena.
- Marriott Fawckner Nicholls, CBE, MChir, FRCS, British subject resident in the Sudan.

State of New South Wales

- Lionel Wolfe Coppleson. For services to the advancement of medical research.
- Robert Keith Yorston, CBE. For services to the community.

State of Victoria

- John Muir Anderson, CMG. For services to the community.
- Charles James Officer Brown, MC, FRCS. For services to surgery.
- Roy Burman Grounds. For services to architecture.

State of Queensland

- Douglas Wadley. For services to commerce and to the community.

State of South Australia

- Alwyn Bowman Barker, CMG. For services to industry and to the community.
- Alderman Charles John Glover, JP. For services to local government and to the community.

=== Order of the Bath ===
==== Knight Grand Cross of the Order of the Bath (GCB) ====
Military Division

- Admiral Sir John Byng Frewen, KCB, Royal Navy.
- Air Chief Marshal Sir Augustus Walker, KCB, CBE, DSO, DFC, AFC, ADC, Royal Air Force.

==== Knight Commander of the Order of the Bath (KCB) ====
Military Division

- Vice Admiral Hugh Richard Benest Janvrin, CB, DSC, Royal Navy.
- Lieutenant-General Peter Mervyn Hunt, CB, DSO, OBE (67201), late Infantry, Colonel Queen's Own Highlanders (Seaforth and Camerons), and 10th Princess Mary's Own Gurkha Rifles.
- Air Marshal Christopher Neil Foxley-Norris, CB, DSO, OBE, Royal Air Force.
- Air Marshal Henry Neil George Wheeler, CB, CBE, DSO, DFC, AFC, Royal Air Force.

Civil Division

- Denis William Dobson, CB, OBE, Clerk of the Crown in Chancery and Permanent Secretary, Lord Chancellor's Department.
- Geoffrey Masterman Wilson, CB, CMG, Permanent Secretary, Ministry of Overseas Development.

==== Companion of the Order of the Bath (CB) ====
Military Division

Royal Navy

- Rear Admiral Louis Edward Stewart Holland Le Bailly, OBE.
- Rear Admiral Dudley Leslie Davenport, OBE.
- Rear Admiral Leslie Derek Empson.
- Rear Admiral Michael Frampton Fell, DSO, DSC.
- Rear Admiral George Wilsmore Gay, MBE, DSC.
- Rear Admiral Geoffrey Archer Henderson.
- Rear Admiral John Bayley Holt.

Army

- Major-General Humphrey Edgar Nicholson Bredin, DSO, MC (67203), late Infantry, Colonel Commandant The King's Division of Infantry.
- Major-General Michael Forrester, CBE, DSO, MC (69349), late Infantry, Colonel Commandant, The Queen's Division of Infantry.
- Major-General Errol Henry Gerrard Lonsdale, MBE (63661), late Royal Army Service Corps.
- Major-General Reginald Joseph Gordon Morrison, CBE, QHP, MD (67302), late Royal Army Medical Corps
- Major-General Arthur Gordon Patterson, DSO, OBE, MC (380841), late Infantry.
- Major-General John Aubrey Taylor Sharp, MC (76719), late Royal Regiment of Artillery.
- Major-General Richard Erskine Ward, DSO, MC (73199), late Royal Armoured Corps.

Royal Air Force

- Air Vice-Marshal John Barraclough, CBE, DFC, AFC.
- Air Vice-Marshal Stanley Bernard Grant, DFC.
- Air Vice-Marshal William Derek Hodgkinson, CBE, DFC, AFC.
- Air Vice-Marshal Thomas Neville Stack, CVO, CBE, AFC.
- Air Commodore John Wesley McKelvey, MBE.

Civil Division

- Fergus Hamilton Allen, Chief Scientific Officer (A), Cabinet Office.
- Douglas Carter, Under Secretary, Board of Trade.
- Harold William Cauthery, Director and Secretary, Land Commission.
- Kenneth Henry Clucas, Secretary, National Board for Prices and Incomes.
- Richard Henry Lionel Cohen, MRCS, LRCP, Deputy Chief Medical Officer, Department of Health and Social Security.
- William Donaldson, Deputy Controller, HM Stationery Office.
- John Vernon Dunworth, CBE, Director, National Physical Laboratory.
- Raymond Gedling, Third Secretary, HM Treasury.
- Arthur Baker Harnden, TD, Senior Director of Operations, General Post Office.
- Conrad Frederick Heron, OBE, Deputy Under-Secretary of State, Department of Employment and Productivity.
- William Millward, CBE, Superintending Director, Government Communications Headquarters, Foreign and Commonwealth Office.
- John Thomas Redpath, MBE, Director General of Research and Development, Ministry of Public Building and Works.
- Edward William Tucker, Director of Dockyards, Ministry of Defence.
- Eric Charles Williams, Chief Scientist, Ministry of Power.
- Claud William Wright, Deputy Under-secretary of State (Air), Ministry of Defence.

=== Order of Saint Michael and Saint George ===
==== Knight Grand Cross of the Order of St Michael and St George (GCMG) ====
- Sir William Denis Allen, KCMG, CB, Foreign and Commonwealth Office.
- Sir David Clive Crosbie Trench, KCMG, MC, Governor and Commander-in-Chief, Hong Kong.

==== Knight Commander of the Order of St Michael and St George (KCMG) ====
- Philip George Doyne Adams, CMG, Her Majesty's Ambassador Extraordinary and Plenipotentiary, Amman.
- Terence Willcocks Garvey, CMG, Her Majesty's Ambassador Extraordinary and Plenipotentiary, Belgrade.
- Michael David Irving Gass, CMG, Colonial Secretary, Hong Kong.
- Eric George Norris, CMG, British High Commissioner, Nairobi.
- Anthony Gerald Roderick Rouse, CMG, OBE, Her Majesty's Consul-General, New York.

==== Companion of the Order of St Michael and St George (CMG) ====
- Robert Greenhill Cochrane, MC, FRCP. For services to the treatment and control of Leprosy.
- Claude James Hayes, Chairman, Crown Agents for Oversea Governments and Administrations; formerly Under-Secretary, Ministry of Overseas Development.
- Professor Leonard John Lewis. For services to education in developing countries of the Commonwealth.
- Compton Alexander Rennie, lately Chief Executive, European Nuclear Energy Agency.
- Frank Howard Whitaker, OBE, Under-secretary, Board of Trade.

Diplomatic Service and Overseas List

- Gordon Booth, Counsellor (Commercial), Her Majesty's Embassy, Copenhagen.
- Kenneth Cavendish Christofas, MBE, Foreign and Commonwealth Office.
- Ernest Howard Davis, OBE, Financial and Development Secretary, Gibraltar.
- Robert Humphrey Gordon Edmonds, MBE, Foreign and Commonwealth Office.
- Frederick Ronald Hayball, Foreign and Commonwealth Office.
- Ronald Christopher Hope-Jones, Foreign and Commonwealth Office.
- The Honourable Edmund Bernard Carlo Howard, MVO, Her Majesty's Consul-General, Genoa.
- David Jeffreys Jones, Puisne Judge, Uganda.
- Eric Thomas Drummond Lambert, OBE, Foreign and Commonwealth Office.
- Anthony Derrick Parsons, MVO, MC, Political Agent, Bahrain.
- John Charles Abercromby Roper, MC, Counsellor and Head of Chancery, United Kingdom Delegation to the Organisation for Economic Co-operation and Development, Paris.
- Brian Thomas Webster Stewart, lately Her Majesty's Consul-General, Hanoi.
- Dugald Leslie Lorn Stewart, Foreign and Commonwealth Office.
- Robert John Stewart Thomson, MBE, Counsellor, British High Commission, Accra.
- Stephen John Whitwell, MC, Her Majesty's Ambassador Extraordinary and Plenipotentiary, Mogadishu.
- Philip Potter Wise, OBE, Director of Audit, Sabah.

State of New South Wales

- Walter Vincent Rowe. For services to the community, particularly to road transport.

State of South Australia

- James Melville, Director, Waite Agricultural Research Institute.

State of Western Australia

- The Honourable John Merrifield Hearman, lately Speaker, Legislative Assembly.

=== Royal Victorian Order ===
==== Knight Grand Cross of the Royal Victorian Order (GCVO) ====
- Brigadier The Right Honourable Charles George Vivian, Baron Tryon, KCB, KCVO, DSO DCVO.

==== Dame Commander of the Royal Victorian Order (DCVO) ====
- The Most Noble Mary Kathleen, Duchess of Abercorn.

==== Knight Commander of the Royal Victorian Order (KCVO) ====
- Sir Arthur Bliss, Mus.D, FRCM.
- Henry Osmond-Clarke, CBE, FRCS.
- Lieutenant-Colonel Francis Vivian Dunn, CVO, OBE, Royal Marines.
- Lieutenant-Colonel John Mandeville Hugo, CVO, OBE.
- Sir Norman Samuel Joseph, CBE.
- Commander Philip John Row, CVO, OBE, Royal Navy.

==== Commander of the Royal Victorian Order (CVO) ====
- Frances Hope Dorothy, Lady Balfour.
- Thomas Humphrey Brooke, MVO.
- Elizabeth Bleckly Clarke.
- Major Peter Cecil Clarke, MVO.
- Group Captain John Lyon Gilbert, DFC, Royal Air Force.
- Charles David Heriot, MVO.

==== Member of the Royal Victorian Order, 4th class (MVO) ====
At this time the two lowest classes of the Royal Victorian Order were "Member (fourth class)" and "Member (fifth class)", both with post-nominal letters MVO. "Member (fourth class)" was renamed "Lieutenant" (LVO) from the 1985 New Year Honours onwards.

- Squadron Leader Jeremy James Husband Dickson, Royal Air Force.
- Reginald Flack.
- Cynthia Gee.
- Mary Goldie.
- Percy Francis Hubbard.
- Commander Stanley George Morgan, Royal Navy.
- Douglas Frank Newham, DFC.
- William Alexander Oliver.
- Wing Commander Anthony William Ringer, AFC, Royal Air Force.
- Surgeon Commander Christopher William James Ussher, MRCS, LRCP, Royal Navy.

==== Member of the Royal Victorian Order, 5th class (MVO) ====
- 2610848 Regimental Sergeant Major John Samuel Bird, MBE, Grenadier Guards.
- Muriel Murray-Brown.
- Francis Derek Drake.
- Leslie Arthur John Elliott.
- Clifford Hargreaves.
- Charles Hawkins.
- Barry Anderson Richards, O'Hara, BEM.
- Veronica Jane Langton.
- Elsie Railton.
- Suzanne Douglas Walker.
- Lieutenant-Commander William Basil Willett, OBE, DSC, Royal Navy.

==== Medal of the Royal Victorian Order (RVM) ====
In Gold

- Arthur Frederick Mitchell.

In Silver

- John Henry Benstead.
- Charles Alexander Candy.
- William Francis Corbett.
- Cyril Sidney Dickman.
- Chief Sailmaker Frederick Stephen Everest, P/JX 381437.
- Messenger Sergeant-Major Francis Albert Foley, MBE, Her Majesty's Bodyguard of the Yeomen of the Guard.
- Arthur Foster.
- Chief Radio Supervisor Laurence Leslie Fuller, P/JX 836430.
- Donald Alfred Gillespie.
- X3503809 Acting Flight Sergeant Peter George Kerswell.
- Jean Pierre Malan.
- Alfred William Powell.
- Albert Edward Southgate.
- Arthur Richard Sparks, BEM.
- G4197280 Sergeant John Triggs.
- Cecily Winifred Tutt.

=== Order of the British Empire ===
==== Knight Grand Cross of the Order of the British Empire (GBE) ====
Military Division

- General Sir Kenneth Darling, KCB, CBE, DSO, ADC (Gen) (44052), late Infantry, Colonel The Royal Regiment of Fusiliers.
- Air Chief Marshal Sir David Lee, KBE, CB, Royal Air Force.

Civil Division

- General Sir Charles Henry Gairdner, KCMG, KCVO, KBE, lately Governor of the State of Tasmania.

==== Dame Grand Cross of the Order of the British Empire (GBE) ====
Civil Division

- Mary Maud Morant (Sister Mary Regis), Headmistress, Our Lady's Roman Catholic Girls' School, Liverpool.
- Lucy Stuart Sutherland, CBE, Historian.
- Elizabeth Ann Yarwood, JP, Alderman, Manchester County Borough.

==== Dame Commander of the Order of the British Empire (DBE) ====
Civil Division

- Hilda Louisa Bynoe, MB, BS, Governor, Grenada.

==== Knight Commander of the Order of the British Empire (KBE) ====
Military Division

- Surgeon Vice Admiral Eric Dick Caldwell, CB, QHP, MD, Royal Navy.
- Vice Admiral Wilfred John Parker, CB, OBE, DSC CBE, Royal Navy.
- Major-General Edward John Hunter Bates, CB, OBE, MC (53108), late Royal Regiment of Artillery, Colonel Commandant Royal Regiment of Artillery.
- Lieutenant-General Richard Alan Fyffe, CB, DSO, OBE, MC (53778), late Infantry, Colonel Commandant, 3rd Battalion The Royal Green Jackets.
- Air Vice-Marshal Benjamin Ball, CB, CBE, Royal Air Force.

Civil Division

- Sir Colin Skelton Anderson. For services to the Arts.
- The Very Reverend Rabbi Israel Brodie. For services to British Jewry.

Diplomatic Service and Overseas List

- John George Figgess, CMG, OBE, lately Counsellor (Information), Her Majesty's Embassy, Tokyo.
- Ratu Kamisese Kapaiwai Tuimacilai Mara, OBE, Chief Minister, Fiji.
- Ernest Russell Storey Wollen, CBE, lately Chairman, Kenya Coffee Marketing Board.

State of New South Wales

- The Honourable Kevin Ellis, Speaker of the Legislative Assembly.

==== Commander of the Order of the British Empire (CBE) ====
Military Division

Royal Navy

- Captain Arthur William Bradshaw.
- Commodore Joe Dines, Royal Fleet Auxiliary Service.
- Captain Evelyn Francis Hamilton-Meikle, MBE.
- Captain Frederick William Hayden, DSC.
- Surgeon Captain John Ballantyne Inverdale.
- Captain Thomas Charles Sherwin, OBE.

Army

- Colonel John Paul Fenwick Abbott (124878), late Royal Army Ordnance Corps, on loan to the Malaysian Armed Forces.
- Colonel John Baxter, TD (288457), Army Cadet Force.
- Colonel Donald Stapeleton Garden (70489), late Infantry.
- Colonel Charles Antony des Noettes Harper, OBE (137860), late Royal Regiment of Artillery.
- Colonel Michael Peter Feltham Jones, DSO (388910), late Infantry.
- Colonel Royston Knowles (178453), late Royal Electrical and Mechanical Engineers.
- Brigadier Edric Henry Peter Lassen, DSO, QHP, MRCS, LRCP (63168), late Royal Army Medical Corps (now retired).
- Brigadier Alfred George Lewis (363423), late Royal Armoured Corps.
- Colonel John Lander Osborne, MBE, TD (88088), late Corps of Royal Engineers, Territorial and Army Volunteer Reserve (now R.A.R.O.).
- Brigadier Hugh Norton Perkins, QHS, MB (66484), late Royal Army Medical Corps.
- Brigadier William Charles Walker Sloan, ADC (63554), late Royal Armoured Corps.
- Brigadier John William Younger, MBE (114122), late Foot Guards.

Royal Air Force

- Air Commodore Ivor Gordon Broom, DSO, DFC, AFC.
- Air Commodore Cyril Bob Brown, AFC.
- Acting Air Commodore John Stanley Mason.
- Group Captain Norman Edward Hoad, AFC.
- Group Captain Michael Edward Hobson, AFC.
- Group Captain Douglas Frederick Harvey Grocott, OBE, AFC.
- Group Captain John Edward Kilduff, for services with the British Joint Services Training Team, Zambia.
- Group Captain Robert Thomas Saunders.
- Group Captain Raymond Archibald Watts, AFC.

Civil Division

- Robert Appleby, Deputy Chairman, Black & Decker Manufacturing Company, Maryland, United States of America. For services to Export.
- William Kenneth Armitage, Sculptor.
- Joseph Cyril Bamford, Chairman and Managing Director, J. C. Bamford (Excavators) Ltd. For services to Export.
- The Reverend William Barclay, Professor of Divinity and Biblical Criticism, University of Glasgow.
- Norman Rupert Barrett, FRCS, MCh, lately Consultant Thoracic Surgeon, St. Thomas' and Brompton Hospitals, London.
- Wing Commander Roland Prosper Beamont, DSO, OBE, DFC, Director, Flight Operations, British Aircraft Corporation Ltd.
- Bernard Nicolas Bebbington, OBE, HM Inspector of Constabulary.
- James Benet Bennett, City Engineer, Surveyor and Planning Officer, Bristol County Borough.
- William Edward Berry, Assistant Secretary, Agricultural Research Council.
- Henry Brian Boyne, Political Correspondent, The Daily Telegraph. Honorary Secretary, Parliamentary Lobby Journalists' Association.
- William Rainforth Branson, lately Chairman, Scottish Gas Board.
- John Brocklebank, MBE, JP. For services to agriculture and agricultural workers.
- John Edward Stevenson Browne, OBE, Chief Constable, Nottinghamshire Combined Constabulary.
- Thomas Allan Burnside, Director of Works, Ministry of Public Building and Works.
- James Clark Cameron, TD, MB, ChB, Chairman, General Medical Services Committee, British Medical Association.
- Allan Frederick Reynolds Carling, Director, The British Electric Traction Company Ltd.
- Anthony Caro, Sculptor.
- Francis George Chinchen, Chief Inspector, Immigration Branch, Home Office.
- Cyril Astley Clarke, MC, FRCP, Professor of Medicine, University of Liverpool.
- David Charles Collins, Chief Executive, Westland Aircraft Ltd. For services to Export.
- Herbert James Cruickshank, Group Managing Director, Bovis Holdings Ltd. For services to the building industry.
- Alan Nugent Goring Dalton, Deputy Chairman, English China Clays Ltd. For services to Export.
- George Garside Dewsnap, Director, Royal Ordnance Factory, Patricroft, Ministry of Defence.
- Leonard Ernest Dove, Accountant and Comptroller General, Board of Customs and Excise.
- Philip Manning Dowson, Architect.
- Arthur Claude Dugard, Chairman and Joint Managing Director, Cooper & Roe Ltd. For services to Export.
- Stanley Emm, MBE, Assistant Secretary, Ministry of Transport.
- John Peter Ford, Chairman, British National Export Council (Latin America). For services to Export.
- Florence Mary Green, JP, lately Headmistress, Abbeydale Grammar School for Girls, Sheffield.
- Edward Elton Young Hales, Chief Inspector of Schools, Department of Education and Science.
- John Capel Hanbury. For services to the pharmaceutical industry and the Health Service.
- Norman Haycocks, Professor of Education, University of Nottingham.
- John Maxwell Hill, DFC, Assistant Commissioner, Metropolitan Police.
- George Vincer Hole, Chief Executive, British Airports Authority.
- Robert Henry Code Holland, Deputy Chairman, Sir Isaac Pitman & Sons Ltd.
- Jack Howlett, Director, Atlas Computer Laboratory, Science Research Council.
- Alfred Norman Irens, Chairman, South Western Electricity Board.
- William Herbert Mosley Isle, Chairman, Economic Development Committee for the Wool Textile Industry.
- Philip Gaved James, Member, British Railways Board.
- Herbert John Jarrold, JP, Chairman, Jarrold & Sons Ltd. For services to Export.
- Doris Annie Jarvis, Headmistress, Tower Hamlets Comprehensive Girls School, Stepney.
- George Rowland Jefferson, Chairman and Managing Director, Guided Weapons Division, British Aircraft Corporation Ltd. For services to Export.
- Denis Gordon Johnson, Chairman and Managing Director, George Bassett Holdings Ltd. For services to Export.
- Hans Peter Jost, Group Managing Director, K. S. Paul Products Group.
- Ronald Edward Jowett, MC, FRCS, Senior Consultant Surgeon, Sunderland Royal Infirmary. Vice-Chairman, Newcastle Regional Hospital Board.
- Richard Starr Jukes, Chairman, British Plaster Board Industries Ltd. For services to Export.
- Malcolm Vyvyan Laurie, OBE, lately Professor of Forestry, University of Oxford.
- Captain Edward William Lewis, Professional Officer and Chief Nautical Surveyor, Board of Trade.
- Agnes Elisabeth Lutyens (Mrs. Edward Clark), Composer.
- Thomas McIver, Deputy Chairman, Swan Hunter & Tyne Shipbuilders Ltd. For services to Export.
- Duncan Robert Mackintosh, OBE, Chairman, Executive Committee, Voluntary Service Overseas.
- William Austyn Mair, Professor of Aeronautical Engineering, University of Cambridge.
- Christopher John Malim, lately Chairman, Board of Governors, Moorfields Eye Hospital, London.
- Albert William Manser, Chief Mechanical Engineer (Railways), London Transport Board.
- Guy Frederic Marrian, lately Director of Research, Imperial Cancer Research Fund.
- Clifford Arthur Michelmore, Television Broadcaster and Producer.
- Gerald Hugh Micklem. For services to Golf.
- Frank Wilfred Harcourt-Munning. For services to War on Want.
- John Pollock McEwan Murray, Headmaster, Stainsby Secondary School, Middlesbrough.
- Thomas William Newson, JP. For services in local government and water supply.
- Alexander James Nicol, Deputy Managing Director, Joseph Lucas (Industries) Ltd.
- Cicely Elizabeth Owen. For services to the Royal Commonwealth Society.
- Ian Veitch Paterson, County Clerk of Lanarkshire.
- Mary Pearce, JP, lately Alderman, Leeds City Council.
- David Towry Piper, Director, Fitzwilliam Museum, Cambridge.
- Ernest Philip Charles Preston, JP, Chairman of the Board of Visitors, HM Borstal, Reading.
- John Rannie, Director, Upper Clyde Shipbuilders Ltd., Glasgow.
- William George Ridd, MVO, Director, The Newspaper Society.
- Lewis Findlay Robertson, Chairman, Eastern Regional Hospital Board, Scotland.
- Robert Stewart Rowe, Director, City Art Gallery, Leeds, and Temple Newsam House.
- Allan Royle, Town Clerk and Clerk of the Peace, Wigan County Borough.
- Helmut Moritz Ruhemann, Picture Restorer.
- The Honourable Godfrey Herbert Samuel, Secretary, Royal Fine Art Commission.
- Peter Wendel Seligman, Chairman, A.P.V. Holdings Ltd. For services to Export.
- Archibald Shiells, Chairman, Electricity Board for Northern Ireland.
- Jessie Smith, JP, Alderman, West Riding of Yorkshire County Council.
- John Arthur Reginald Staniforth, Director, John Brown & Company Ltd. Managing Director, Constructors John Brown. For services to Export.
- Victor John Stock, Chairman, Labour Relations Committee, National Federated Electrical Association.
- Frank Taylor, Chief Fire Officer, Liverpool Fire Brigade.
- George Lawrence Thornton, Assistant Secretary, Department of Education and Science.
- Ernest St. John Tuck, Commodore Chief Engineer, SS Windsor Castle, British & Commonwealth Shipping Company Ltd.
- Reginald Charles Tucker, Assistant Secretary, Department of Agriculture and Fisheries for Scotland.
- Thomas Tuohy, Managing Director, Production Group, Risley, United Kingdom Atomic Energy Authority.
- Brigadier John Theodore de Home Vaizey, Alderman, Essex County Council.
- Richard Weck, Director of Research, The Welding Institute.
- Denny Brome Weigall, Deputy Director of Engineering, British Broadcasting Corporation.
- Lieutenant-Colonel George Anthony Wharton, MBE, TD, DL, Chairman, Territorial Auxiliary and Volunteer Reserve Association for the East Midlands.
- Arthur Vivian Williams, General Manager, Aycliffe and Peterlee Development Corporation.
- Harold Frederick Wilson, OBE, HM Divisional Inspector of Mines and Quarries, Ministry of Power.
- Douglas Cory-Wright, Chairman of the Chamber of Coal Traders. For services to the coal industry.
- Colonel Sir Owen Watkin Williams-Wynn, Bt, JP. For services to agriculture in Wales.
- Alexander Lowson Young, lately Director of Education, Aberdeenshire.

Diplomatic Service and Overseas List

- John Apley, MC, FRCP, JP, lately Head of British Paediatric Team in Saigon.
- John Felix Byng-Hall, OBE, lately Managing Director, Kenya Co-operative Creameries.
- Geoffrey Ievers de Glanville, United Kingdom citizen resident in Ceylon.
- Charles Henry Gurd, OBE, MD, MRCP, Director of Medical Services, Fiji.
- Geoffrey Cadzow Hamilton, Deputy Colonial Secretary, Hong Kong.
- Margaret Harwood, lately Adviser on Secondary Education, Nigeria.
- Robert Francis Innes, United Kingdom citizen lately resident in Jamaica.
- Philip John Jenkins, British subject resident in Brazil.
- Kenneth Strathmore Kinghorn, District Commissioner, New Territories, Hong Kong.
- Justin Lewis, QC, Attorney-General, Fiji.
- Group Captain Alexander MacDougall, British subject resident in Uruguay.
- David Mortimer, lately Accountant-General, Malaysia.
- Cecil Stack, United Kingdom citizen lately resident in India.

State of New South Wales

- Alderman Douglas Gordon McDougall, Lord Mayor of Newcastle.
- David Ramsay McNicoll. For services to journalism.

State of Victoria

- Edgar John Rouse. For services to the advancement of medical research and radiology.
- Norman Richard Seddon. For services to the community, particularly through the medium of the arts.

State of Queensland

- John Hector Baillie Henderson, MB, BS, of Toowoomba. For services to the community, particularly to the mentally ill.
- Francis Joseph McAvoy. For services to the sugar industry.

State of South Australia

- Arthur Keith Ashby. For services to the community.

State of Western Australia

- Charles Robert Bunning. For services to the timber industry, and to the community.

State of Tasmania

- John Edis, FRCOG, MRCS, lately Director General, Health Services.

==== Officer of the Order of the British Empire (OBE) ====
Military Division

Royal Navy

- Commander Glen Edgar Crosbie.
- Instructor Commander Albert Edwin Curtis, Royal Navy (now retired).
- Commander Philip James Durell.
- Commander Geoffrey Anthony Greswell Edleston.
- Commander Richard Redmond Gordon, VRD, Royal Naval Reserve.
- Commander Michael Bernard Harvey.
- Commander Robert Stephen Henley, DSC.
- Engineer Commander Maurice Bertram Jermyn.
- The Reverend Thomas Hubert McDonagh.
- Major John Frederick Mottram, Royal Marines.
- Muriel Ernestine Myers, RRC, Principal Matron, Queen Alexandra's Royal Naval Nursing Service.
- Commander John Roderick Morris Platt.
- Commander Harry Guy Vere, DSC.

Army

- Lieutenant-Colonel (Quartermaster) James Aitken, MBE (420159), The Parachute Regiment.
- Lieutenant-Colonel Christopher Malcolm Barrett (354898), The Royal Regiment of Fusiliers.
- Lieutenant-Colonel Alfred Christopher Bate, MBE (400751), Royal Corps of Signals.
- Lieutenant-Colonel Denys Lloyd Glynn Begbie, MC (235603), Corps of Royal Engineers.
- Lieutenant-Colonel (acting) Victor Albert Blake, MBE (125037), Army Cadet Force.
- Lieutenant-Colonel Peter John Bush (321578), The Light Infantry.
- Lieutenant-Colonel William George Rollo Corkill (249345), Royal Regiment of Artillery.
- Lieutenant-Colonel and Staff Paymaster Maurice Herbert Cuthbert, MBE (183666), Royal Army Pay Corps.
- Lieutenant-Colonel Patrick Rupert Richard De Burgh (273178), Royal Regiment of Artillery.
- Lieutenant-Colonel David Eric Martin Earle (179945), Royal Regiment of Artillery.
- Lieutenant-Colonel Peter Hendry Flear (268232), Royal Corps of Signals, on loan to the Malaysian Armed Forces.
- Lieutenant-Colonel Peter Meredith Hamer (357332), 11th Hussars (Prince Albert's Own).
- Lieutenant-Colonel Michael John Harbage, MC (345097), The Royal Regiment of Fusiliers, serving with the British Army Training team in Kenya.
- Lieutenant-Colonel Lionel Alexander Digby Harrod, MBE (320943), The Welch Regiment.
- Lieutenant-Colonel (Staff Quarter Master) Joseph Arthur Victor Hughes (230473), Royal Corps of Transport, now R.A.R.O.
- Colonel Thomas James Anthony Hughes (416650), late Royal Electrical and Mechanical Engineers.
- Lieutenant-Colonel (E. and M.O.) William Jasper Jones (422014), Corps of Royal Engineers.
- Lieutenant-Colonel (Acting) Iain Ferguson Macdougall (376435), Combined Cadet Force.
- Lieutenant-Colonel Norman Maclean, MB (303308), Royal Army Medical Corps, Territorial and Army Volunteer Reserve.
- Lieutenant-Colonel John Loudon Purdon (220864), Royal Corps of Signals.
- Lieutenant-Colonel Douglas Rennie (276277), Royal Regiment of Artillery.
- Lieutenant-Colonel Albert Maurice Norval Rodgers, TD (149499), Robin Hood Foresters, Territorial and Army Volunteer Reserve.
- Lieutenant-Colonel John James Harrison Swallow (69604), Royal Corps of Signals.
- Lieutenant-Colonel John Swinton (312961), Scots Guards.
- Lieutenant-Colonel (acting) Ewen Reginald Woodford Ware (339842), Royal Electrical and Mechanical Engineers.
- Lieutenant-Colonel David Wallace Williams, TD (360189), Somerset Yeomanry and Light Infantry (Territorial), Territorial and Army Volunteer Reserve, now R.A.R.O.
- Lieutenant-Colonel Maurice Finlay Alexander Wilson (366796), Royal Hampshire Regiment.

Royal Air Force

- Acting Group Captain Michael Gordon Beavis, AFC.
- Wing Commander Henry Ewart Boothby (149503).
- Wing Commander Irving Boyd (131608).
- Wing Commander Louis Anthony Ferguson (3039130).
- Wing Commander Harold Cecil Flemons (76312), (Retired).
- Wing Commander Lionel Biram Fletcher (85466).
- Wing Commander John Fraser Hall, MBE (150524).
- Wing Commander David John Leith (194328).
- Wing Commander Hubert John Parker, DFM (49289).
- Wing Commander Edward James Allott Patterson (129563).
- Wing Commander Alan Dudley Scott Phillips, MBE (202463).
- Wing Commander John Frederick Potter, DFC (50593).
- Wing Commander Keith Redfern Richardson, DFC (187724).
- Wing Commander William David Rooney (112551).
- Wing Commander Frank Vincent (188756).
- Acting Wing Commander Stanley Dawson (100270), Royal Air Force Volunteer Reserve (Training Branch).

Civil Division

- Jane Margaret Adam, JP. For public services in Manchester.
- Thomas Allsop, lately Chief Livestock Husbandry Adviser, National Agricultural Advisory Service, Ministry of Agriculture, Fisheries and Food.
- Joseph Evelyn Fernon Anderson, City Surveyor, Belfast County Borough.
- Edgar Harold Macfarlane Anstey, Documentary Film Producer.
- Thomas Charles Arnold, Theatrical Manager.
- Stanley David Askew, Clerk of the Metropolitan Water Board.
- Alec Field Atkin, Lightning Project Manager (Special Director), British Aircraft Corporation (Preston) Ltd. For services to Export.
- James Bain, lately Rector, Grantown Grammar School, Morayshire.
- Rupert Arnold Barnett, JP, Divisional Officer, Union of Shop, Distributive and Allied Workers, Northern Ireland, Merseyside and the North West.
- Derek Stiven Maxwelton Barrie, MBE, General Manager, Eastern Region (York), British Railways Board.
- Charles Alfred Julian Barrington, Conservator for South East England, Forestry Commission.
- Frederick Biggs Bath, Principal, Science Research Council.
- John Bayliss, Grade 2 Officer, Department of Employment and Productivity.
- Reginald Ernest Geoffrey Benbow, lately Deputy Chief Constable, Birmingham City Police.
- John Arthur Berry, JP, DL, Managing Director, Aluminium Corporation Ltd., Dolgarrog. For services to Export.
- Reginald Moreton Billington, TD, DL, Inspector of Wireless Telegraphy, General Post Office.
- John Vivian Bingay, MBE, LDS, RCS, lately Director, School for Dental Auxiliaries, New Cross, London.
- Bridget Mary Blundell. Grade 5 Officer, Diplomatic Service.
- Alexander Bonthrone, JP, Member, National Savings Committee for Scotland.
- Henry James Bradley, General Secretary, National Union of Journalists.
- Winifred Mary Brancker, MRCVS, lately President, British Veterinary Association.
- James Allen Bullock, National President, British Association of Colliery Management.
- Ronald Henry William Burkett, Managing Director, Welwyn Electric Ltd., Bedlington, Northumberland. For services to Export.
- Harry Buttery, Chairman, Wellingborough, Peterborough, Kettering and District War Pensions Committee.
- Dennis Ian Cadman, National Vice-Chairman, British Legion.
- James William Calder, lately Alderman, London Borough of Lambeth.
- Archibald Leslie Camden, Bassoonist.
- Charles Carter, lately Director, Art Gallery and Regional Museum, Aberdeen.
- Harry Ernest Chamberlain, MBE, JP, Chairman, Oldham and District Savings Committee.
- Mabel Elizabeth Winifred Chamberlain. For services to Music in Education.
- John Clarke. For services to agriculture in Northern Ireland.
- Walter Clayton, MBE, Headmaster, Knottingley County High School.
- Harry Cohen, Headmaster, Finnart House School, Weybridge.
- Cyril Colbeck, Secretary/Accountant, The English-Speaking Union of the Commonwealth.
- Margaret Stewart Coltart, lately Head Medical Social Worker, The Brompton Hospital, London.
- Henry Cooper. For services to Boxing.
- David Arthur Corbett, County Inspector, Royal Ulster Constabulary.
- Eric George Cowley, Regional Scientific Adviser for Civil Defence, Wales.
- Catherine Beatrice Crane, MB, BS, lately Medical Officer of Health, York City County Borough Council.
- Laurance Henry Crossley, Clerk to the Justices, Uxbridge Petty Sessional Division.
- James Cuming, General Manager (Supplies), British European Airways.
- John Kenneth Hutt Cunningham, MBE, Assistant Chief Officer (Third Officer), London Fire Brigade.
- Cyril Graham Davies, General Manager (Personnel), Scunthorpe Division, Midland Group, British Steel Corporation.
- Elizabeth Mary Davies, HM Inspector of Schools, Wales, Department of Education and Science.
- Jonah Deakin, Member, Aldridge/Brownhills Urban District Council.
- John Harold Dean, lately Acting County Surveyor and Bridgemaster, Lancashire County Council.
- Lieutenant-Colonel John Herbert Alston Dean, Director, Worcestershire Branch, British Red Cross Society.
- Mary Kathleen Dennett. For services to education in Bridlington and the East Riding of Yorkshire.
- Norman Storey Dickson, MB, BCh, JP, lately Secretary, British Medical Association for Northern Ireland.
- Philip Joseph Dix, JP, Councillor, Tamworth Borough Council.
- John Valentine Ralph Du Rose, Commander, Metropolitan Police.
- Percy George Dymond, London Editor, Belfast Telegraph.
- Charles Percival Eastburn, lately General Manager and Clerk, Southampton Harbour Board.
- Robert Holt Edmondson, Chief Executive Officer, Board of Trade.
- Mary Garbett-Edwards. For services to the community in Montgomeryshire.
- Stanley Entwistle, JP. Alderman, Bolton County Borough.
- Kenneth Fairfax, Editor, External Services News, British Broadcasting Corporation.
- Olive Lanyon Farquharson, Chairman, Saffron Walden Borough and Rural District Local Savings Committee.
- Gordon Patrick Ferguson, ED, Adviser to Hong Kong students in Britain.
- David Alexander Finlayson, LDS, RCS (Ed.), Chief Dental Officer, Dundee School Dental Service.
- Eric Harold Ford, lately Inspector for Public Local Inquiries, Ministry of Transport.
- Edward Forster, Senior Principal Scientific Officer, Ministry of Technology.
- Frederick Charles Fox, Deputy Chairman, Ceramics, Glass and Mineral Products Industry Training Board.
- Barry Oliver Bevan Funnell, Managing Director, Bevan Funnell Ltd. For services to Export.
- Alderman Henry George Gange. For services to local government in Harrow.
- John Graham, MBE, Chief Public Health Inspector, City of Manchester.
- Paul Kingsley Graves, JP, lately Chairman of Advisory Committee on Justices of the Peace for Hove.
- Lieutenant-Colonel James Gray, MBE, TD, Managing Director, James Gray & Company (Stirling) Ltd., Grain Importers and Agricultural Merchants.
- Walter Clifford Greaves, General Manager, Central Planning Department, British Petroleum Company Ltd.
- Lieutenant-Colonel Alan Henry Barrett Greene, JP, Honorary County Secretary, Staffordshire Soldiers', Sailors' and Airmen's Families Association.
- Bernard Randolph Greenhead, Director of Studio and Engineering, Thames Television.
- Terence Wyatt Gregory, City Architect and Planning Officer, Coventry.
- Denis Lashford Griffin, Chief Engineer, Welsh Industrial Estates Corporation.
- Helen Grimshaw, Principal Scientific Officer, Royal Aircraft Establishment, Farnborough, Ministry of Technology.
- John Alexander Gulland, Head of Department of Adult Studies, Goldsmiths College, New Cross, London.
- Archibald Dearman Hamilton, Supervisor of Overseas Survey Courses, School of Military Survey, Newbury, Ministry of Overseas Development.
- George Ernest Hardy, lately Headmaster, Borden Grammar School, Sittingbourne.
- Rowland Evelyn Harris, Editor, Police Review.
- Rundle Harris, Governor Class 1, Wakefield Prison, Home Office.
- Herbert Harrison, Chief Welfare Officer, North Riding of Yorkshire County Council.
- James Gordon Harrison, AFC, Chief Test Pilot, Hawker Siddeley Aviation Ltd., Stockport, Cheshire.
- Lieutenant-Colonel Edward John Hatfield, DL, lately Secretary, Territorial and Auxiliary Forces Association for the County of Devon.
- Birkin Haward, Architect.
- Arthur Lafone Frank Hills. For services to Forestry.
- Glen Milton Hobday, Sales and Service Manager, and Special Director, British Aircraft Corporation (Preston) Ltd. For services to Export.
- Conrad Almeric Holmes, lately Organiser of Physical Education, Newcastle upon Tyne County Borough Education Committee.
- Henry George Huckle, Managing Director and Chief Executive, Shellstar, Ltd.
- Joseph Hull, JP, Chairman, Derby and District Local Employment Committee.
- William Leslie Hulley, Senior Planning Officer, Welsh Office.
- Diana Mary Rought Hutchcroft, Headmistress, Saltford Primary School.
- John Malcolm Hutcheon, Head of Reactor Materials Laboratory, Culcheth, United Kingdom Atomic Energy Authority.
- William Towers Hutchison Inglis. For services to Anglo-French relations.
- James Nigel Jackaman, Director, Tilbury Contracting Group Ltd.
- Louis Arscott Jackets, Head of Air Historical Branch, Ministry of Defence.
- Alderman Idwal Pierce Jones, Traffic Commissioner, North Western Area.
- John Balfour Kay, JP, Chairman, Housing Committee, Kirkcaldy Town Council.
- Patrick Keegan. For services to international Christian workers' movements.
- Charles Henry Keeler, Optician/Member, General Optical Council.
- Patrick Joseph Kelly, Chairman, Dorset and South Somerset Local Advisory Committee.
- Lyndesay Graham Langwill, lately Secretary and Treasurer, Scottish Society for the Prevention of Cruelty to Animals.
- Louis Neilson Stewart Leith, Head of Geography Department, Wood Green Comprehensive School.
- Mary Leith, lately Headmistress, Dungannon High School for Girls.
- John Mark Anthony Lenihan, Physicist, Western Regional Hospital Board (Scotland).
- Professor Patrick Aloysius Linehan, Senior Principal Scientific Officer, Ministry of Agriculture for Northern Ireland.
- John Edward Long, Chief Executive Officer, HM Treasury.
- Mary Long, Principal Lecturer in Art and Head of the Arts and Crafts Department, Shenstone College of Education.
- Vera Lynn (Vera Margaret Lewis). For services to the Royal Air Forces Association and other charities.
- Annie Frances McGuinness, Matron, Purdysburn Hospital, Belfast.
- Ronald Hugh Macintosh, Construction Manager, Scottish Special Housing Association Ltd.
- Bruce Mackie, Member, North Eastern Agricultural Executive Committee (Scotland).
- Andrew Frederick McLeod, Superintending Armament Supply Officer, Ministry of Defence.
- John Allan McPherson, HM Inspector of Schools (Higher Grade), Scottish Education Department.
- William Belfield Macpherson, lately President, American Division of Cadbury-Fry (Export) Ltd. For services to Export.
- George Ernest Manning, Headmaster, Ashburton Secondary School for Boys, Croydon.
- Arthur William Marcroft, JP, Managing Director, John Bright & Brothers Ltd., Cotton and Synthetic Fibre Spinners and Weavers, Rochdale.
- Sidney Marks, Chairman and Managing Director, M.Y. Dart Company (Games) Ltd. For services to Export.
- Captain Basil Eustace Edwyn Marshall, Commander, Civil Aviation Flying Unit, Board of Trade.
- Maurice Digby Mason, MBE, Superintending Electronic/Communications Engineer, Government Communications Headquarters, Foreign and Commonwealth Office.
- Kenneth Henry Reid Maynard, Chief Executive Officer, Department of Education and Science.
- William Edward Meade, Member, Board of Governors, St. George's Hospital, London.
- Reginald Robert Melhuish, Manager, Patents and Agreements Department, Imperial Chemical Industries (Fibres) Ltd. For services to Export.
- William John Meredith, Chief Physicist, Christie Hospital and Holt Radium Institute, Manchester.
- Herbert Leslie Milliard, TD, JP, Secretary, Leicester and County Chamber of Commerce. For services to Export.
- Ronald Leslie Moore, Senior Principal Scientific Officer, Road Research Laboratory, Crowthorne, Ministry of Transport.
- Marion Morrison, lately Matron, Bangour Village Hospital, West Lothian.
- Harold Geoffrey Moss, lately Chairman, Central National Health Service (Chemist Contractors) Committee.
- Margaret Macartney Murray, MBE, lately Matron, Herrison Hospital, Dorchester.
- Patrick Granville Murray, British Council Representative, Scotland.
- Joseph Brian Mylchreest, TD, JP. For public services in the Isle of Man.
- Alfred Stanley Newman, Managing Director, Alan J. Ridge & Company Ltd. For services to the coffee trade.
- Ronald Gordon Newton, Director of Research, The British Glass Industry Research Association.
- Wing Commander Frank Donald Nugent, AFC, Principal, Airwork Services Training, Perth, Scotland (Air Holdings Ltd.).
- Lieutenant-Colonel Frank Percival Nurdin, Sales Director, British Communications Corporation. For services to Export.
- Valentine Evelyn Orde. For services to music in the North East.
- Frank Donald Outridge, Director, Scientific Instrument Manufacturers Association. For services to Export.
- Donald Cecil Pack, Vice Principal and Professor of Mathematics, University of Strathclyde.
- Hazel Dorothy Hale Parsons, Head Teacher, Grove Infant School, Birmingham.
- Arthur Paul, JP, Alderman, London Borough of Barnet.
- Alan Richard Pike, Senior Chief Executive Officer, Metropolitan Police.
- Reginald Pilkington, Member, Workmen's Compensation (Supplementation) Board.
- Captain Colin Thomas Pitt, Marine Superintendent, C.T. Bowring & Company Ltd.
- David Griffith Price, MBE, Director, National Wool Textile Export Corporation. For services to Export.
- Mary Roper Price. For services to education in Oxford.
- Peter Francis Rank, Chairman, Waltham Forest Borough Savings Committee.
- George Bayldon Read, JP, Chairman, Lincolnshire (Lindsey) Agricultural Executive Committee.
- Samuel Thomas Rees, Director of Manufacture, Ford Motor Company Ltd., Brentwood. For services to Export.
- David Lewis Richards, Principal, Neyland Technical College. For services to local employment.
- Harry Riley, Alderman, East Sussex County Council.
- Hywel Wyn Roberts, Vice-Chairman, Welsh Association of Youth Clubs.
- Margaret Surman Robinson, MBE, Secretary, Nuffield Trust for the Forces of the Crown.
- Henry Victor Roe, Senior Chief Executive Officer, HM Stationery Office.
- Stanley Charles Rosser, President, Post Office Engineering Union.
- Rognvald Gordon Russell, TD, MB, ChB, General Medical Practitioner, West Hartlepool. Chairman, Hartlepools Hospital Management Committee.
- Captain Thomas Ralph Challinor Rutherford, Master, SS Esso Warwickshire, Esso Petroleum Company Ltd.
- George Redvers Saunders, Chairman and Managing Director, Saunders (Ipswich) Ltd.
- John Wilfred Shirley, Chairman, Buckinghamshire Agricultural Executive Committee.
- Frank William Skelcher, Director, South Eastern Region, Central Electricity Generating Board.
- Thomas James Harman Sloan, Head of Light Entertainment Group, Television, British Broadcasting Corporation.
- Henry Smith, Manager, Public Works Department, Sheffield County Borough.
- Ian Fergusson Gordon Stott, Tutor to Overseas Students, Institute of Education, University of Bristol.
- Lewis Strachan, Director, Jute Industries (Holdings) Ltd. For services to Export.
- Maurice McLeod Symington, TD, Director, Corrie MacColl & Son Ltd.
- Beresford Gerald Herbert Brooke Taylor, Social Development Officer, Dawley New Town.
- Robert Atkinson Tennent, MBE, FRCS, FRCOG, Senior Obstetrician and Gynaecological Surgeon, Lanarkshire.
- Richard John Aldridge Thody, District Manager, East Midland District, British Road Services Ltd.
- William John Franklyn Thomas, JP, DL, Alderman, Carmarthenshire County Council.
- Frederick Alfred Thorpe, JP, Publisher, Ulverscroft Large Print Books for the Partially Sighted.
- William Thyne, Chairman, William Thyne (Holdings) Ltd. For services to Export.
- Basil Martin Tracey, MB, FRCS. For medical services at HM Prison, Norwich.
- Arthur Hadkinson Travis, formerly Assistant Director, Aero Engine Research and Development Division, Ministry of Technology.
- George Charles Froom Tyler, Editor, South Wales Evening Post.
- John Gordon Tyson, Chairman, South Cumberland National Insurance Local Tribunal.
- Henry Alexis Van Thuyne, General Administrator, Claridge's Hotel. For services to the tourist trade.
- James Henry Walker, General Manager, Royal Arsenal Co-operative Society Ltd.
- Joseph Francis Walker, Secretary, Scottish Association for National Certificates and Diplomas.
- Martin Wallace, Trustee, Belfast Savings Bank.
- Wilfred Skirving Wareham, Head of the Quotations Department, Stock Exchange.
- Cuthbert Arthur Harry Watts, MC, FRCGP, General Medical Practitioner, Leicester.
- Dorothy Mary Wedgwood. For services to the disabled.
- James Matthew John Whellens, Principal Engineer, G.E.C.-A.E.I. (Electronics) Ltd., Leicester. For services to Export.
- Benjamin John Whittingham, Farmer, Shropshire.
- John Herbert Wyndham Wilder, Deputy Chairman, National Institute of Agricultural Engineering.
- Edith Kathleen Wilkes, Head Teacher, Grove Junior School, Birmingham.
- Frederick John Wilkin, DFM, Accountant, House of Commons.
- Robert Charles Gooding Williams, Chief Engineer, Philips Electronic & Associated Industries Ltd. For services to Export.
- William Arthur Williams, MBE, Consultant, Association of British Manufacturers of Agricultural Chemicals.
- Arthur John Willis, Chief Experimental Officer, Headquarters Training Command, Brampton, Ministry of Defence.

Diplomatic Service and Overseas List

- Walter Rigby Andrews, United Kingdom citizen resident in Pakistan.
- Peter George Bagshaw, Vice-Principal, Egerton College, Njoro, Kenya.
- Clarence Eric Stanley Bailey, MBE, MB, ChB, Chief Medical Officer, Antigua.
- Basil Leo Balcombe, JP. For services to the community in Saint Vincent.
- Kathleen Margaret Barr, Principal Matron, Sabah.
- Denys Henry Birch, British subject resident in the United Arab Republic.
- Clement James Richard Bridge, Senior Agricultural Officer, Sabah.
- Chiu Lut-sau, MBE. For services to the community in Hong Kong.
- George Maurice Cole. For voluntary public service in the Bahama Islands.
- Peter Collenette, lately Director, Geological Survey, East Malaysia.
- Alan Crotty, British subject resident in the United States of America.
- Ratu Jione Atonio Rabici Dovi, MBE, MB, ChB, lately Divisional Medical Officer, Eastern Division, Fiji.
- Arthur Daniel Duffy, Commissioner of Inland Revenue, Hong Kong.
- Jean Desire Maxime Ferrari, MB, BCh. For services to health and social welfare in the Seychelles.
- Colin Frederick Figures, First Secretary, Her Majesty's Embassy, Vienna.
- Margaret FitzHerbert, MRCS, LRCP. For medical and welfare service in Ethiopia.
- Kenneth Fletcher, Deputy Commissioner of Police, Nigeria.
- Robert Edward Gamble, First Secretary (Commercial), Her Majesty's Embassy, Vienna.
- Nigel Winsor Hean Gaydon, lately First Secretary (Information), Her Majesty's Consulate-General, Frankfurt-am-Main.
- Owen Glyn Griffith, MVO, First Secretary and Head of Chancery, Her Majesty's Embassy, Khartoum.
- Richard Frederick Harper, British subject lately resident in the People's Republic of Southern Yemen.
- Arnold Caesar Hawkins, British Council Representative, Austria.
- Arthur Cyril Heathcote, Director, Posts and Telecommunications, Lesotho.
- Francis Hughes, British subject resident in the Persian Gulf.
- Finlay Watt Hutchison, Head of Estates Advisory Service, Rubber Research Institute, Malaya.
- Anthony Brian Ingledow, First Secretary, British High Commission, Ibadan.
- William Albert Johnston, MBE, ED, JP, Comptroller of Customs, British Honduras.
- Peter Joy, First Secretary (Information), Her Majesty's Embassy, Beirut.
- Kenneth Kirby, First Secretary (Administration) and Consul, Her Majesty's Embassy, Beirut.
- Humphrey Cecil Dodwell Knight, British subject resident in Japan.
- Gertrude Mary Lindell, British subject resident in France.
- Matthew McKinnon Linning, British subject resident in Kuwait.
- Daniel James Lloyd, MBE, lately First Secretary, Her Majesty's Embassy, Washington.
- Wilfred McKeown, lately Customs and Excise Adviser, Cyprus.
- James Marshall Messenger, lately Principal of the Nairobi Polytechnic, Kenya.
- John Edward Morris, Deputy Head, Chemistry Division, Rubber Research Institute, Malaya.
- Robert Urquhart Paul. For services to civil aviation in the New Hebrides.
- Ronald Thomas George Platt, British subject resident in the United States of America.
- Harold Preston, Bursar, University of Ibadan, Nigeria.
- Gerald Barker Read, British subject resident in the Sudan.
- Anthony Gilmore Reynolds, United Kingdom citizen resident in India.
- John Heads Rhodes, Chief Agricultural Officer, Lesotho.
- Reginald Frederick Arman Rogers, Quantity Surveyor, National Universities Commission, Nigeria.
- Eric Freeth Roper, Chief Engineer, Electricity Department, Public Utilities Board, Singapore.
- Thomas Emmanuel Ryan, MBE, Permanent Secretary, Ministry of Social Services, Montserrat.
- Roger David Sheldrick, lately Acting Director, Nigerian Institute for Oil Palm Research.
- John Gerald Sherry, Chief Engineer, Nigerian Railways Corporation.
- John James Sinclair, lately Her Majesty's Consul, Turin.
- Stanley Patrick James Smith, Chief Mediterranean Correspondent, British Broadcasting Corporation.
- Antony Wolryche Stansfeld, United Kingdom citizen resident in India.
- Frank Fenwick Steele, First Secretary, British High Commission, Nairobi.
- Gerald Victor Summerhayes, Administrative Officer, Northern Nigeria.
- Derek Noel Royden Taylor, British subject resident in the United States of America.
- John Luscombe Tester, MB, BS, Director, Edinburgh Medical Missionary Hospital, Nazareth.
- James Frederick Thornley, Educational Adviser, Nigeria.
- Sydney Thomas Thurley, lately Headmaster, Uplands School, Malaysia.
- James Eady Tod, Principal, Gaya College, Kota Kinabalu, Sabah.
- John Patrick Tunstall. For services to the Commonwealth cotton industry.
- James Mathie Ure, lately Director of Studies, Regional Institute of English, Bangalore, South India.
- Sarsfield Lucan Hall Walshe, Deputy Commissioner, Veterinary Services. Uganda.
- Daniel Reynold Walwyn. For services to the community in Saint Christopher-Nevis-Anguilla.
- John Paul Woodhouse Ward, Surveyor-General, Northern Nigeria.
- Alexander William Menzie Watt, Deputy Chief Conservator of Forests, Uganda.
- William John Watts, First Secretary (Commercial), Her Majesty's Embassy, Bangkok.
- Claude Harold Whistler, British Council Representative, Chile.
- Martin Trowbridge Wilson, lately Member of Legislative Council, Bermuda.
- Frieda Margaret Young, lately Her Majesty's Consul, Bergen.
- Katharine Margaret Young, MB, ChB. For medical and welfare service in West Nepal.

State of New South Wales

- Jean Sinclair Isbister, MB, BS. For services to medicine.
- Francis Augustine Kirby. For services to industry.
- The Reverend John Herbert Mason (Father Joseph). For services to the community.
- Claude Dominic Renshaw. For services to local government and to rural industry.
- William John Scotford. For services to the metal industry.
- Emeritus Professor Leslie Wilkinson. For services to architecture.

State of Victoria

- Colin Keon-Cohen. For services to the community, particularly to ex-servicemen.
- Councillor Priscilla Crawcour, of Geelong. For services to local government and to the community.
- Colonel Joseph Rex Hall, ED, of Glen Iris. For services to ex-servicemen.
- Lieutenant Commander William Euan Ironside Littlejohn, DSC, MB, BS. For services to medicine.
- Percy Pembroke Page, MM, of Kew. For services to the community.
- Kathleen Harley Bright-Parker. For services to the community, particularly to women and girls.

State of Queensland

- James Duncan Bennett, of Barcaldine. For services to local government and to the community.
- James McCormack. For services to the community and to local government.
- Emily Marie Hinchsliff Speed. For services to the community, especially to Country Women.
- Bertram Thomas Tunley. For services to commerce and to the community.

State of South Australia

- The Reverend Carl Julius Pfitzner, Pastor, Lutheran Church.
- Frederick Earl Roberts, Chief Inspector Boilers and Factories, South Australian Government.
- John James Medley. For services to the Citrus Industry.

State of Western Australia

- Harold Boas, JP. For services to architecture and town planning.
- Dudley Keith House, JP. For services to local government.
- Joseph Thomas Mitchell. For services to the welfare of Spastic children and adults.

State of Tasmania

- Reginald Eric Chopping, lately Chairman, Kingborough Emergency Livestock and Fodder Committee.
- John Henry Curtain, JP. For services to the community.

==== Member of the Order of the British Empire (MBE) ====
Military Division

Royal Navy

- Lieutenant John Stephen Coggins.
- Lieutenant Commander (S.D.) James Forster.
- Lieutenant Commander Dennis Hand, Royal Naval Reserve. For service in Singapore Naval Volunteer Force.
- Supply Lieutenant Commander John Norman Hartley.
- Lieutenant Commander Kenneth Frank Huggons, VRD, Royal Naval Reserve.
- Engineer Lieutenant Commander Raymond Edwin Lawrence.
- Lieutenant Commander Alexander Macdonald.
- Lieutenant Commander Walter Wilmington Dudley Matthews.
- Lieutenant Commander Ronald William Palastre.
- Instructor Lieutenant Commander Arthur Edward Simmonds.
- Lieutenant Commander Kenneth Whitaker.
- Acting Major John Wynne-Potts, Royal Marines.

Army

- Captain (T.I.G.) Douglas Harry Allinson (475891), Royal Regiment of Artillery.
- 22316872 Warrant Officer Class II Robert James Mills Baird, Royal Army Ordnance Corps.
- The Reverend Hugh Beattie, Chaplain to the Forces 3rd Class (R.C.) (469670), Royal Army Chaplains' Department.
- Major (Quartermaster) Daniel John Bebbington (451759), Royal Anglian Regiment, formerly serving with the Guyana Defence Force, now retired.
- Major (Quartermaster) James Thomas Brickell (459438), The King's Own Royal Border Regiment.
- Major Margaret Greig Campbell (384276), Women's Royal Army Corps.
- Major Donald Campbell-Morrison (476111), General List. On loan to the Malawi Army.
- 14467822 Warrant Officer Class I Sidney Albert Chaplin, The Staffordshire Regiment (The Prince of Wales's).
- Major Peter Ogilvie Merlott Chitty (397846), Corps of Royal Engineers.
- Major Ernest Cooper (415903), Royal Corps of Signals, now R.A.R.O.
- Major (Quartermaster) Douglas Frederick Covill, DCM (464568), 10th Royal Hussars (Prince of Wales's Own).
- Captain (Director of Music) Edward Crowcroft (472357), the Prince of Wales's Own Regiment of Yorkshire.
- Major Gwilym Lloyd Davies (390085), Royal Army Ordnance Corps.
- Major Michael Day (433004), Royal Army Ordnance Corps.
- Major David William Fladgate (393132), The Duke of Edinburgh's Royal Regiment (Berkshire and Wiltshire).
- Major David Vivian Ford (369043), 3rd Carabiniers (Prince of Wales's Dragoon Guards), Serving with British Joint Services Training Team Jamaica.
- Captain Ernest Froggatt (334450), Royal Corps of Transport (now retired).
- Major Elizabeth Garnetta Gilbert, TD (230621), Women's Royal Army Corps, Territorial and Army Volunteer Reserve, now R.A.R.O.
- Major Timothy Miles Hartley (445887), The Royal Green Jackets.
- Lieutenant Frederick Alfred Lenard Hedditch (467684), Combined Cadet Force.
- Major Alan Malcolm Hinings (430327), The Loyal Regiment (North Lancashire).
- 19042666 Warrant Officer Class I John William Nicholson Holberton, The Queen's Royal Irish Hussars, now retired.
- Major (acting) Thomas Hyslop (344380), Army Cadet Force.
- 22182597 Warrant Officer Class II Brian Lionel Jeffery, Army Physical Training Corps.
- Captain David Fitzherbert Jones (464217), Corps of Royal Engineers, now retired.
- Major John Ledsham (284319), Royal Regiment of Artillery, now R.A.R.O.
- Major Brian Jeremy Lowe (433179), The Light Infantry.
- Major (Quartermaster) Douglas Thomas Maber (446066), Small Arms School Corps.
- Major John Marshall (393211), Royal Tank Regiment.
- 3608695 Warrant Officer Class I Alfred John Matthews, The King's Own Royal Border Regiment.
- Major (acting) Robert Henry Metcalfe (359581), Corps of Royal Military Police, now retired.
- Major (Q.G.O.) Kunjalal Moktan (401266), Gurkha Transport Regiment.
- Major (Quartermaster) Joseph Montgomery (445729), Royal Army Ordnance Corps.
- Major Peter Edward Morrison (420894), Corps of Royal Engineers.
- Major (Quartermaster) James O'Connor (302512), Royal Regiment of Artillery.
- Major (acting) Dennis Laurence Payne (332710), Army Cadet Force.
- Major Denis Austin Milford Phipps (393247), Corps of Royal Military Police.
- 22950376 Warrant Officer Class II Kenneth John Pinkard, Small Arms School Corps.
- 3710656 Warrant Officer Class I John Plant, The Royal Hampshire Regiment.
- Major David Charles Purves (406441), The Royal Anglian Regiment, Territorial and Army Volunteer Reserve.
- Captain (Quartermaster) Kenneth David Roberts (475485), The Welch Regiment.
- 23668168 Warrant Officer Class II Ridwen Glyn Roberts, The Queen's Regiment, Territorial and Army Volunteer Reserve.
- Captain George Lancelot St. Leger Rolleston (457421), Coldstream Guards.
- Major William George Russell (226023), Royal Army Educational Corps.
- Captain (Quartermaster) Albert Schofield (465638), The Sherwood Foresters (Nottinghamshire and Derbyshire Regiment).
- Major Harold William Schofield, TD (212028), Royal Army Pay Corps.
- Major Jack Schofield (376359), The Queen's Regiment, Territorial and Army Volunteer Reserve.
- Major Derek Sefton Scull (95639), The Queen's Regiment, formerly on loan to the Singapore Military Forces.
- Major (Quartermaster) Philip Henry Tocock (467258), Royal Tank Regiment.
- 19046975 Warrant Officer Class I James Christopher Veale, The Royal Irish Rangers.
- 19185763 Warrant Officer Class I Arthur Lewis Wennington, Royal Army Ordnance Corps.
- 14451617 Warrant Officer Class I Peter Westrope, Royal Regiment of Artillery.
- Major (acting) Michael Gerald Wyatt (448756), 17th/21st Lancers.

Royal Air Force

- Squadron Leader Dempster Dobbie Anderson (2513073), Royal Air Force Regiment.
- Squadron Leader Albert Fred Bailey (50627), (Retired).
- Squadron Leader Peter Joseph Alan Chislett (2524640).
- Squadron Leader Peter Geoffrey Cock (607358).
- Squadron Leader Malcolm Raymond Curtis (2773599).
- Squadron Leader Michael Sydney Davis (2999518).
- Squadron Leader Cyril Thomas Flynn, MB, ChB (507765).
- Squadron Leader Derek Herbert Jones (152217).
- Squadron Leader John Ross Lambert (2388886).
- Squadron Leader Jack Baldwin Mountain (4071820).
- Squadron Leader Arthur Cyril Needham (49383).
- Squadron Leader Anthony Charles Neve (191132).
- Squadron Leader Norman Matthew Ridley (3140749).
- Squadron Leader Edward Ian Pease (5051237), for services with the Royal Malaysian Air Force.
- Squadron Leader Frederick Scott (2520356).
- Squadron Leader John Francis Strong (3510416).
- Squadron Leader Duncan Robert McKechnie Watson (3512365).
- Squadron Leader Geoffrey Raymond Willson (58568).
- Squadron Leader Edward Stanley Frederick Wright (575196).
- Acting Squadron Leader William Douglas Campion (574737).
- Acting Squadron Leader John Leslie Roberts (4193450).
- Acting Squadron Leader Eric John Viles (205657), Royal Air Force Volunteer Reserve (Training Branch).
- Acting Squadron Leader Donald Elmer Wakelin (110000), Royal Auxiliary Air Force.
- Flight Lieutenant George Albert Bates (577964).
- Flight Lieutenant John Field (583174).
- Flight Lieutenant Graham Raymond George Gimblett (136940), for services with the British Joint Services Training Team, Zambia.
- Flight Lieutenant Andrew Malcolm McGregor (56699).
- Flight Lieutenant Kenneth Newman (3138103).
- Flight Lieutenant Norman Maxwell Shorter (196954).
- Flight Lieutenant David John Worman (507613).
- Acting Flight Lieutenant Peter Norman Vines (3108283), Royal Air Force Volunteer Reserve (Training Branch).
- Warrant Officer Frederick John Cattermoul (YO532194).
- Warrant Officer Robert Joseph Goody (BO617672), for services with the British Joint Services Training Team, Ghana.
- Warrant Officer Alvin Denis Hill (M1352836), Royal Air Force Regiment.
- Warrant Officer Rosina Kerr (X2158896), Women's Royal Air Force.
- Warrant Officer Ernest Frederick John Ludlow, BEM (JO529413), for services with the Royal Malaysian Air Force.
- Warrant Officer John Murphy (G2297407).
- Warrant Officer Evan Royden Thomas (WO592059).
- Warrant Officer Jack Thorpe (JO613836).
- Master Navigator William Carpenter Todd, AFM (W1602361).

Civil Division

- Marjorie Ethelreda Abbott, Supervisor, The Junior Training Centre, Jersey.
- Leonard Acolina, Local Clerk Grade I, Gibraltar, Ministry of Defence.
- Peggy Doreen Alexander, Guide Lecturer.
- Flora Allen. For services to the community in Newry, County Down.
- Mary Agnes Anderson, Chief Executive Officer, Housing and Lands Administrator, Aldermaston, United Kingdom Atomic Energy Authority.
- Thomas Tindle Anderson, Chairman, Regional Family Casework Committee, Northumberland Council of Social Service.
- John Wallace Archer, Headmaster, Pencaitland Primary School.
- Margaret Arnold, Secretary, United Kingdom Cutlery and Silverware Manufacturers' Association.
- Delia Mary Isabel Ashworth, Children's Officer, Thomas Coram Foundation for Children.
- John Edwin Bailey, Chief Superintendent, Metropolitan Police.
- Nigel Bruce Bain, Secretary and Treasurer, West of Scotland Agricultural College.
- Amice Gertrude Bannister, Headmistress, St. John's Church of England Primary School, Chipping Sodbury, Gloucestershire.
- Eric Sydney Barber, Warehouse Superintendent, Dyestuffs Division, Imperial Chemical Industries Ltd.
- George Edmund Barker, General Works Manager, Burton-on-Trent and Carlisle, Pirelli Ltd.
- John Dunsmuir Barr, Honorary Secretary, Lanarkshire Local Savings Committee.
- Phyllis Margaret Bartlett, Grade 5 Officer, Department of Employment and Productivity.
- Albert Ernest Batchelor, Director, Council of British Ceramic Sanitaryware Manufacturers.
- Harold Oliver Albert Beal, Clerical Officer, Ministry of Defence.
- Percy Allen Bedford, Trawler Skipper, Fleetwood, Lancashire.
- Marjorie Beer, lately Southern Area Officer, National Institute of Housecraft.
- George William Bick, Clerical Officer, Board of Trade.
- David John Bowen, JP, Deputy Chairman, Pembrokeshire Agricultural Executive Committee.
- Lieutenant-Commander Jack Kenilworth Verrnon Bowles, Royal Naval Reserve (Retired), Vice President, Barnet and Hornsey Sea Cadet Corps Units.
- Eric Samuel Bradbury, JP, Clerk to the West Bromwich (National Health Service) Executive Council.
- Hannah Josephine Bradshaw, Vice-Chairman, St. Helen's Local Savings Committee.
- John Robert Braithwaite, MRCVS. For services to Shooting.
- Philip St. Aubin Brazier, Managing Director, Eaton and Wrighton Ltd. For services to Export.
- Owen Stanley Brettle, Building Liaison Manager, West Midlands Gas Board.
- Wing Commander Reginald Alfred Charles Brie, Personal Assistant to the Managing Director, Westland Helicopters.
- Zachry Brierley, Chairman and Managing Director, Z. Brierley Ltd., Llandudno. For services to Export.
- Francis Harold Bristow, Honorary Secretary, Tower Hamlets Borough Savings Committee.
- Guy Bristow, Chief Test Engineer, Small Engine Division, Rolls-Royce Ltd., Hatfield. For services to Export.
- William Edgar Brough, Senior Executive Officer, Government Communications Headquarters, Foreign and Commonwealth Office.
- William Grimes Brown, Valuer (Main Grade), Board of Inland Revenue.
- David John Bryant. For services to Bowls.
- George Fothergill Budden, Assistant Engineer-in-Charge, Operations, North Region, British Broadcasting Corporation.
- Victor Charles Budgen, Higher Executive Officer, Cabinet Office.
- Geoffrey Thomas Edwin Buggins, Managing Director, Thwaites & Reed Ltd. For services to Export.
- Edna Butfield, Principal, West End Hospital Speech Therapy Training School, London.
- Helen Henderson Campbell, lately Superintendent Midwife, Raigmore Hospital, Inverness.
- Richard Chester Cartwright, Supervising Examiner (Driving Tests), Yorkshire Traffic Area, Ministry of Transport.
- Irene Mary Chamberlain. For social work in South Wales.
- Donald John Chapman, National Savings District Member for South East Devon.
- Charles John Chilman, Hill Farmer and Deputy Chairman, Herefordshire Agricultural Executive Committee.
- Eric James Chinn, lately Base Commander, British Antarctic Survey.
- Dorothy Elizabeth Church. For services to Islington Old People's Welfare Association.
- James Clark, MC, FRCP. For services to Sheffield hospitals.
- Charles John Thomas Clarke, Assistant Executive Engineer, Telephone Manager's Office, Cardiff, General Post Office.
- William Alfred Cloutman, General Secretary, National Federation of Post Office and other Civil Service Veterans.
- William Albert Colhoun, JP, Chairman, Omagh Rural District Council.
- Phyllis Evelyn Cook, Organiser of School Meals, Reading County Borough.
- Roy Coombes, Superintendent, Cheshire Constabulary.
- Robert Edward Coombs, Chief Superintendent, Hampshire Constabulary.
- Edward Arthur Cooper, Clerk of Works, National Institute for Research in Dairying, Reading.
- Hilda Cope, Managing Director, James Arthur & Company Ltd., Stoke-on-Trent.
- James Craig, Secretary and Aftercare Officer, Discharged Prisoners' Aid Society, Northern Ireland.
- Doris Martha Alice Crane, Telecommunications Traffic Superintendent, General Post Office.
- Philip Henry Crockett, Managing Director, County Chamois Company Ltd. For services to Export.
- Geoffrey Frederick Cutting, Director, Heating and Ventilating Contractors' Association.
- Leonard Hurworth Dale, Chairman and Managing Director, Dale Electric of Great Britain Ltd., Filey, Yorkshire. For services to Export.
- Margaret Doris Davie, Clerical Officer, Department of Health and Social Security.
- Frances Stephanie Heslop-Davies, Secretary, Export Council for Europe. For services to Export.
- John William Davies, Divisional Organiser, No. 7 Division, Amalgamated Engineering Federation.
- David Davis (William Eric Davis), Producer, Drama Department, Radio, British Broadcasting Corporation.
- Jesse Dawes, Chief Investigation Officer, Ministry of Agriculture, Fisheries and Food.
- William Day, BEM, Principal Doorkeeper, House of Lords.
- James Edward Diggins, General Manager and Director, Racal (Mobilcal) Ltd. For services to Export.
- William George Dilley, Export Manager, Excelsior Ropes Ltd., Cardiff. For services to Export.
- Henry Joseph Divey. For voluntary social services in Twickenham and district.
- Major The Honourable Thomas Robin Valerian Dixon. For services to Winter Sports.
- James Dolan, Organising Secretary, Warwickshire Association of Boys' Clubs.
- Donald James Dewing Doughty, BEM, lately Head of Routes and Touring Information Unit, Automobile Association.
- Margaret Joan Downing, Staff Officer to the Superintendent-in-Chief, St. John Ambulance Brigade.
- John Henry Drew, JP, lately Chairman, Aldershot and District Employment Committee and Disablement Advisory Committee.
- Charles James Duck, Clerk of the Paddington Rent Tribunal, Ministry of Housing and Local Government.
- Dennis Eaden, Member, Hoyland Nether Urban District Council.
- Barbara Ellen Eames, Higher Executive Officer, Public Record Office.
- Eric Edwards, Chairman, H. S. Marsh Ltd., Reading. For services to Export.
- Alderman Frederick George Edwards, lately Chairman, Ludlow Rural District Council.
- Leslie Eggleton, Senior Executive Officer, Board of Trade.
- Arthur Henry Ellenden, Senior Executive Engineer, South Eastern Telecommunications Region, General Post Office.
- Freda Neale Ellis, Regional Organiser, Nottingham Region, Women's Royal Voluntary Service.
- Geoffrey Harold Ellis, Chief Sea Trials Engineer, Smiths Industries Ltd. (Kelvin Hughes).
- George Brian Elphick, Member, Chester (National Health Service) Executive Council.
- Joan Doris Evernden, Higher Clerical Officer, Board of Inland Revenue.
- Victor Cleveland Farrance, Principal Clerk, Supreme Court Taxing Office, Lord Chancellor's Department.
- Cyril Farrand, JP, Councillor, Whitefield Urban District Council.
- Christopher Martin Finnegan. For services to Boxing.
- Stanley Barden Fisher. Headmaster, Clapham Road Junior Mixed School, Bedford.
- William Harry Fletcher. Cypher Superintendent, Diplomatic Wireless Service.
- Reginald Charles Foot, lately Headmaster, Alexandra School, Dortmund, Ministry of Defence.
- Joseph Vernon Forster, Group Engineer (Trunk and County Roads), Durham County Council.
- Allastair Roy French, Higher Executive Officer, Ministry of Defence.
- Doris Joan Gardener, County Organiser, Wiltshire, Women's Royal Voluntary Service.
- Alice Eugenie Garrett, Honorary Secretary (Scotland), Abbeyfield Society.
- Henry George Garrett, lately Superintendent and Registrar of Cemeteries and Crematorium Department, Brighton County Borough.
- Lilian Garstin. For social services in Cornwall.
- Joseph Frank Gaunt, Director of Research, Patons & Baldwins Ltd., Darlington. For services to Export.
- Herbert Gee, Technical Class Grade I, Royal Ordnance Factory, Burghfield, Ministry of Technology.
- David Fortnam Gibbs, Regional Scientific Training Officer for Civil Defence, South Western Region.
- Edward Walter Giddings, Clerk of Works, South Western Regional Hospital Board.
- Samuel Gifford, Grade 3 Officer, Department of Employment and Productivity.
- Commander Henry Lionel Gilbert, Royal Navy (Retired), Lately Inspector, Cambrian Division, HM Coastguard, Board of Trade.
- Walter Telford Gilby, Chief Fire Officer, Wakefield Fire Brigade.
- Eric Cuthbert Gillanders, Chairman, Stirling and Clackmannan War Pensions Committee.
- Olive Eleanor Agnes Mary Gillespie, Higher Executive Officer, Office of the Parliamentary Counsel.
- Charles Grove Glenie, JP, Member, Surrey Agricultural Executive Committee.
- Edward George Gomm, Secretary, Transport Users Consultative Committees for Wales and Monmouthshire and the South West of England.
- Kathleen Mary Goodbody, lately Chairman, Bradford and District Local Employment Committee.
- Ernest Arthur Goodman, Headmaster, Manchester High School of Art.
- Phyllis Irene Goodwin, lately Higher Executive Officer, Ministry of Defence.
- Jean Margaret Gordon, Headmistress, Balnacraig School, Perth.
- Evelyn Mary Daphne Goss, Executive Officer, Home Office.
- Eleanor Sarah Graham, Member, Ross and Cromarty County Council.
- Bertram Greenhalgh, JP. For services to the community in Astley, Lancashire.
- Lewis Roy Griffin, Regional Scientific Training Officer for Civil Defence, Wales.
- Sarah Winifred Griffin, Services Welfare Officer, Women's Royal Voluntary Service.
- Arthur Powell Griffiths. For services to local government and the community in Monmouthshire.
- Arthur Trevor Griffiths, Honorary Secretary, Llangunnor and District Local Savings Committee.
- Richard Steele Grover, JP, Chairman and Managing Director, The Bentley Piano Company Ltd., Woodchester, Stroud, Gloucestershire. For services to Export.
- Wilfred Norman Gully, Dredging Inspector, British Transport Docks Board.
- Charles Stanley Hale, Lately Executive Engineer, Southampton Telephone Area, General Post Office.
- Leonard William Harris, Regional Commercial Manager, Cable & Wireless Ltd.
- Louis Harris, Chairman, Hull, Beverley and District War Pensions Committee.
- Wilfred Harrison. For services to Education in Tenby.
- Phyllis May Hart, lately Night Superintendent St. Nicholas' Hospital, Plumstead, London.
- Valerie Edith Mary Hartles, Grade 7 Officer, Diplomatic Service.
- Cyril Hartless, Chief Welfare Officer, Midlands Postal Region, Birmingham, General Post Office.
- Dorothy Gwenllian Hearn, Chairman, Wendover Local Savings Committee.
- David Peter Hemery. For services to Athletics.
- Henry William Hencher, Executive Officer, RAF College, Cranwell, Ministry of Defence.
- Robert Herbert, Assistant Firemaster, Western Area Fire Brigade, Scotland.
- John Watson Hewitson, Administration Director, Marchon Division, Albright & Wilson Ltd. For services to Export.
- John Joseph Higgins, Formerly Headmaster, St. Fergus's Primary School, Paisley.
- Horace Alexander Holt, TD, Works Technical Grade A, Ministry of Public Building and Works.
- Freda Hornbrook, Grade 3 Officer, Department of Employment and Productivity.
- George Hubert Horrey, lately Treasurer, Essex River Authority.
- Edith Mary Horsley, lately Chairman, Halifax Supplementary Benefits Appeal Tribunal.
- Eric George Howarth, Clerk of Sidmouth Urban District Council.
- Robert Bertrand Howarth, Member, Bridport Rural District Council.
- Frank Leonard Hubball, Chairman, Kettering Municipal Borough Local Savings Committee.
- John Archibald Kerr Hunter, Adviser, Scottish Council of Physical Recreation.
- William Alexander Irwin, lately Area Secretary (Northern Ireland), Electrical Trades' Union.
- Mary Josephine Jackson, Health Visitor, Essex County Council.
- Maurice Jackson, Chairman, Beccles Local Savings Committee.
- Evangel Mary Margaret Jeffery, Private Secretary to Director and General Manager, Moston Group of Factories, Ferranti Ltd. For services to Export.
- Ernest John Jewesson, Higher Executive Officer, Board of Trade.
- Cyril Frederick Johns, Senior Draughtsman, Ministry of Defence.
- William Johnston, JP, lately Provost of Montrose.
- Adrianne Shirley Jones. For services to Lawn Tennis.
- Edryd Jones, Registrar of Births, Marriages and Deaths, Merthyr Tydfil Lower.
- Jack Edward Jones, Traffic Engineer, Essex County Council.
- Lawrence Edward Jones, Director, Birmingham Association of National Federation of Building Trades Employers.
- Nancy Jane Jones, County Borough Organiser, Merthyr Tydfil, Women's Royal Voluntary Service.
- Walter Rhys Jones, Deputy Director, Queen Elizabeth's Training College for the Disabled, Leatherhead, Surrey.
- Saville Jowett, Head of Equipment Services Group, Research Department, Aviation Division, Smiths Industries Ltd., Cheltenham. For services to Export.
- Frederick Stephen Henry Justin, Senior Probation Officer, Leicester Probation and AfterCare Area.
- Isobel Margaret Kelly, Headmistress, Trinity Street County Infants' School, Birkenhead.
- Winifred Ada Kendrick, Ward Sister, Leavesden Hospital, Abbots Langley, Hertfordshire.
- Jessie Lillie Kennedy, lately Teacher, Achnacarry Primary School, Inverness-shire.
- Guy Malcolm Kerman, Chief Chemist, Aberthaw & Bristol Channel Portland Cement Company Ltd.
- Augustus George Kingham, Managing Director and Secretary, Thames Valley Eggs, Ltd. For services to agricultural co-operation.
- John Robert King-Horn, Governor (Class IV), Inverness Prison, Scottish Office.
- John Forrester Kinney, Clerk of Works, Ulster Television Ltd.
- Jessie Gordon Knox, Principal Teacher of Classics, Hutchesons' Girls' Grammar School, Glasgow.
- Rosamond Christabel, Lady Langham, lately Girl Guide Commissioner, County Fermanagh.
- Harry Dean Langridge, lately Assistant to the Manager, Central Services, Navy, Army and Air Force Institutes.
- Archie Lawrance, lately Marketing Officer, Grade II, Ministry of Agriculture, Fisheries and Food.
- Douglas Ronald Lawrence, Clerical Officer, Ministry of Defence.
- Frank Lawrence, Inspector (Higher Grade), Board of Inland Revenue.
- Adrian Francis Le Maitre, JP, Chairman, Newport (Isle of Wight) Supplementary Benefits Appeal Tribunal.
- James Herbert Lewin, lately District Mechanical Inspector, Mersey Docks and Harbour Board.
- Wilfrid Garland Lewis. For services to road safety for children in Leeds.
- Thomas Cyril Lightfoot, Engineer I, Engineering Directorate, Springfields Works, United Kingdom Atomic Energy Authority.
- Claude Edward Charles Linder, lately Technical Class Officer Grade A, Ministry of Defence.
- John Lindley, lately Charge Nurse, Rampton Hospital.
- John Henry Lloyd, Conductor, Mold Alun Choir.
- Frederick John Lock, General Secretary, London Transport (Central Road Services) Sports Association.
- Christopher Lofthouse, Regional Engineer, Northern Region, British Waterways Board.
- Arthur Oliver Lyman, Chairman and Managing Director, Reginald Dickens Ltd., Harrold, Bedfordshire. For services to Export.
- Elsie Mary Maccallum, Clerical Officer (Secretary), Board of Customs and Excise.
- Edward Joseph McCavana, JP, Vice-Chairman, South Antrim Hospital Management Committee.
- Andrew Malcolm McDearmid, Stores Liaison Officer, London Cargo Terminal, British Overseas Airways Corporation.
- Mary Kerr McFaden, Honorary Secretary, Filey Local Savings Committee.
- Duncan Fairhe McGregor, Shore Engineer, Ocean Weather Ships, Ministry of Defence.
- Samuel McKay, Shipyard Manager, Joinery Section, Harland & Wolff Ltd., Belfast.
- Herbert William Wigley Macklin, Road Safety Officer, Gravesend, Northfleet and Swanscombe.
- James Keith Macleod, Deputy Manager, Civil Aircraft Contracts Department, (Weybridge Division), British Aircraft Corporation Ltd. For services to Export.
- Alice Cornelia Maconochie, Resident Representative, National Trust for Scotland, Inverewe Gardens, Ross-shire.
- Catherine Cecilia MacPherson, Station Superintendent, British European Airways, Barra.
- Alfred McWhinney, District Inspector, Royal Ulster Constabulary.
- Observer Lieutenant Thomas Jervis Madew, Group Officer, No. 16 Group, Royal Observer Corps.
- Marjorie Ethel Mainwaring, Grade 7 Officer, Diplomatic Service.
- Charles Henry Mardell, Honorary Secretary, British Association of the Hard of Hearing.
- William Ronald Matthews, Treasurer, Newport and East Monmouthshire Hospital Management Committee.
- Peter Alfred John May, Senior Factory Manager, Rockware Glass Ltd.
- John William Millray, JP, lately Chairman, North Westmorland Rural District Council.
- William Harold Mills, Manager, North Glamorgan District, South Wales Electricity Board.
- Harold Minshull, Main Grade Lands Officer, Ministry of Defence.
- Kathleen Walker Minto, Assistant, Organisation, Methods and Grading Department, British Broadcasting Corporation.
- Bernard Gerald Montague, Local Assistant Accounts Officer, Malta, Ministry of Defence.
- William Copeland Moody, JP, Chairman, Banbridge Rural District Council.
- Lillian Moore, Head of the Education Department, The English-Speaking Union of the Commonwealth.
- George Morgan, Divisional Director, Hydraulic Machinery (Great Britain) Ltd. For services to Export.
- Walter Charles Moss, Technical Manager, Coal Utilisation Council.
- John Henney Muir, lately Senior Depute Transport Manager, Edinburgh Corporation Transport.
- Mary Rita Munckton, Executive Officer, Welsh Office.
- Joseph Desmond Murphy, Honorary Secretary, Apostleship of the Sea, Liverpool.
- Barbara Mary Naish, Head of Home Safety Division, The Royal Society for the Prevention of Accidents.
- Antony James Dillon Nash. For services to Winter Sports.
- Marjorie Nicholson, Assistant International Department, Trades Union Congress.
- John Douglas Nimmo, Chief Superintendent, Manchester and Salford Constabulary.
- Catherine Fraser Norrie. For services to Chiropody in Scotland.
- James Thomas Norton, Higher Executive Officer, British Museum.
- Phyllis Daisy Nunn, Headmistress, Peterhouse Infants School, Gorleston, Great Yarmouth.
- William Leonard O'Brien, Voluntary Road Safety Organiser, City of Cardiff.
- Ronald Frank Padfield, Vice-Chairman, Portishead Urban District Council.
- Millicent Painton, Sister-in-Charge, Ear, Nose and Throat Ward, Bristol General Hospital.
- Ethel Margaret Panting, Secretary to Chief Works Manager (Swindon), British Railways Workshops, British Railways Board.
- Albert Parrish, Head of Standards Section, Engineering Services Department, Imperial Chemical Industries Ltd.
- May Parry, lately Welfare Officer, Royal Air Force Comngsby, Soldiers' Sailors' and Airmen's Families Association.
- Henry Partington, JP, Chairman, Leigh, Atherton and Tyldesley Local Employment Committee.
- Lieutenant Rodney Stuart Pattisson, Royal Navy. For services to Yachting.
- James Patton, lately Chief Accountant, Territorial and Auxiliary Forces Association for the County of Northumberland.
- Ernest Pears, Clerk of Shipley Urban District Council.
- Joan Pearse. For services to child welfare.
- John Taylor Peden, Manager, Engineering Department (East), Glenfield & Kennedy Ltd., Kilmarnock. For services to Export.
- William Francis Peppitt, Chairman, Brent and Camden Local Advisory Committee.
- Mildred Perrott. For services to the Mediterranean Mission to Seamen in Gibraltar.
- David Stanley Prescott, lately Chairman, Horncastle, Woodhall Spa and District Local Savings Committee.
- George Leslie Prescott, Headmaster, Stockbridge County Junior Mixed School, Knowsley, Lancashire.
- Stella Mary Price, Higher Executive Officer, Ministry of Public Building and Works.
- Thomas Price, Head of Industrial Training Branch, East Wales Area, National Coal Board.
- Thomas John McKee Priestley, Principal, Harmony Hill County Primary School, Lisburn, County Antrim.
- Owen Pryke, Sales Manager (Overseas), The Hoffmann Manufacturing Company Ltd., Chelmsford. For services to Export.
- Captain John Eraser Pugh, Commodore Master of the Fleet, Palm Lines Ltd.
- Thomas Albert Charles Quelch, Senior Experimental Officer, Ministry of Defence.
- Margaret Mary Quilligan, Industrial Nursing Sister, Redifon Ltd.
- Lionel Hubert Ralph, lately Manager, Personnel Department, Shell-Mex & British Petroleum Ltd.
- Alfred James Vincent Richardson, Chairman, Chatham Local Savings Committee.
- Dorothy Katherine Rinkel, Non-Medical Supervisor of Midwives, Wolverhampton County Borough.
- George Fairfax Roper, Chief Welfare Officer, Royal Air Forces Association.
- Alexander Rose, Head Forester, Forestry Commission for Scotland.
- Leslie John Rose, Senior Executive Officer, Board of Customs and Excise.
- Jessie Rosie Ross. For services to health and Welfare in Glasgow and West of Scotland.
- The Reverend Marcus Wyndham Scottross, Director of St. Andrew's Club (Commonwealth Forces), Terendak, Malacca, Malaysia.
- Sydney George William Ross, Senior Warning Officer, Horsham Group, United Kingdom Warning and Monitoring Organisation.
- Arthur William Rowe, Divisional Officer Grade III, Cornwall Fire Brigade.
- Marie Rudman, Grade 9 Officer, Diplomatic Service.
- Arthur Gerald Russell, Chairman, Leamington, Warwick and District War Pensions Committee.
- Samuel William Rutherford, Honorary Secretary, South Down Regional Savings Committee.
- Michael Vernon Ryan, Deputy Principal Probation Officer, Essex Probation and After-Care Area.
- Alexander Richard St. Pierre, Honorary National Welfare Officer, Burma Star Association.
- Arthur Albert Schneider, Chairman, Crescent Toy Company Ltd., Cwmcarn, Monmouthshire. For services to Export.
- Abraham Scott, JP, District Commandant, Ulster Special Constabulary.
- Herbert Mark Scott, Member, Somerset (National Health Service) Executive Council.
- Penelope Mary Scrutton, Attached Ministry of Defence.
- Freda Seal. For services to the Young Farmers' Club Movement in Leicestershire.
- Constance Mary Sheerman, Headmistress, Bradley Rowe Infants School, Exeter.
- Amy Joan Sheldon, Grade 3 Officer, Department of Employment and Productivity.
- Anne Sherman. For services to charities in Merthyr Tydfil and South Wales.
- Hilda James Shield, Deputy Headmistress, Percy Hedley School for Spastics, Newcastle upon Tyne.
- John James Shipston, lately Clerk of Stanley Urban District Council, County Durham.
- Ivy Maud Sinden, Higher Executive Officer, Department of Health and Social Security.
- Clair Marie-Therese Sloan, Head Teacher, Ramsdale Park Residential School, Arnold, Nottinghamshire.
- Laura Smale, lately District Nurse/ Midwife/Health Visitor, Westmorland County Council.
- Elsie Smith, Instrumental Music Teacher.
- Iain Somerled Macdonald-Smith. For services to Yachting.
- Joie Welbrock-Smith, Principal Administrative Officer, Oxford Regional Hospital Board.
- Spencer George Solly, General Works Manager, Kearney & Trecker-C.V.A. Ltd. For services to Export.
- Herbert Charles Spears, Councillor, Chester-le-Street Urban District Council.
- Captain Joseph Frank Stanier, Chairman, Sheffield and District Convalescent and Hospital Services Council.
- Frederick Allen Stanley, Sales Director, Cumberland Fashions Ltd. For services to Export.
- Harry William Staples, Assistant Secretary, Police Superintendents Association of England and Wales.
- Norman Harold Steed, JP, lately Chairman, Canterbury District Committee, Kent Agricultural Executive Committee.
- Alexander Stenhouse, Deputy Chief Constable, Dumfries and Galloway Constabulary.
- William James Stephens, Higher Executive Officer, Ministry of Defence.
- Andrew Edward Stevenson, MB, ChB (Ed.), General Practitioner, Sanquhar, Dumfriesshire.
- Barbara Mary Stow, Director, Disabled Living Activities Group, Central Council for the Disabled.
- Frank Herbert Summerfield, lately Senior Experimental Officer, Institute for Research on Animal Diseases, Compton, Berkshire.
- Frank Gower Sutherland, Clerk of Dorking Urban District Council.
- William Sutton, Technical Grade "A", Ministry of Technology.
- Frederick Richard Swaine, Electrician, MV British Destiny, British Petroleum Tanker Company Ltd.
- Thomas Frederick Swift. For services to the Scout Association in Norfolk.
- William George Ernest Weeks Tamlin, Head of Department, Dockyard Technical College, Devonport, Ministry of Defence.
- Dora Taylor, Home Teacher to the Blind, Hertfordshire County Council.
- Dorothy Winifred Taylor, Senior Collector, Board of Inland Revenue.
- Lawrence Ernest Taylor, Chairman, Shrewsbury Local Savings Committee.
- Lucy Barbara Taylor, Inspector (Higher Grade), Board of Inland Revenue.
- Doreen Jane Thomas, Group Principal Nurse Tutor, Combined Hospital School of Nursing, Reading, Berkshire.
- Harold George Thomas, Charge Nurse, Warlingham Park Hospital, Surrey.
- Margaret Philothea Thompson, Assistant Editor, The Bookseller.
- Gertrude Thoms, JP, Burgh Organiser, Brechin, Women's Royal Voluntary Service.
- George Thomson. For services to Music in Scotland.
- John William Threadingham, Managing Director, Delapena Honing Equipment Ltd., Cheltenham. For services to Export.
- Roderick John Tindale, Chief Engineer, Newalls Insulation & Chemical Company Ltd. For services to Export.
- George Henry Tomblin, Higher Executive Officer, Ministry of Agriculture, Fisheries and Food.
- Sydney Harold Townsend. For services to the deaf in Ulster.
- Francis George Raglan Turmaine, Superintendent of Printing, Votes and Proceedings, House of Commons.
- Richard John Verney, Higher Executive Officer, Ministry of Technology.
- Arnold James Waddington, Chairman, Stratford-upon-Avon Municipal Borough Local Savings Committee.
- Albert John Walford, Intelligence Officer I, Ministry of Defence.
- Albert Arthur Wallis. For services to the Electrical Trades Union in Yorkshire.
- Ada Gertrude Wass, Domiciliary Midwife, East Suffolk.
- Alice Waterhouse, Committee Member and Outings Secretary, Marple Old Folks Association, Cheshire.
- Bertie Watson, lately Chief Superintendent and Deputy Chief Constable, Tees-side Constabulary.
- Kenneth Strahan Watt, Executive Officer, Department of Health and Social Security.
- Eric Frederick Webster, Senior Executive Officer, Paymaster General's Office.
- Jack Denis West, Works Engineer (Electrification), Chief Civil Engineer's Department, York, Eastern Region, British Railways Board.
- Isobel White, Grade 4 Officer, Department of Employment and Productivity.
- John Wickins, JP, Councillor, Staveley Urban District Council.
- Harry Wilcock, Assistant Director of Design (Rolling Stock), British Railways Board.
- Elizabeth McRoberts Wilkin, Junior Staff Officer, Ministry of Home Affairs for Northern Ireland.
- Dorothy Wilkinson (Mrs. Felthouse), Headmistress, Greenheys Infant School, Moss Side, Manchester.
- Charles Frederick Williams, Chairman No. 54 (Eastbourne) Squadron Committee, Air Training Corps.
- Harry Williams, Councillor, Norman Cross Rural District Council.
- James Williams, Local Director, Samuel Osborn & Company Ltd., Sheffield.
- John Henry Williams, Assistant Head Postmaster, Leicester, General Post Office.
- Horace Gordon Winterbotham, Export Sales Manager and Assistant Director, Cooper & Roe Ltd. For services to Export.
- Harry Wright, Chief Draughtsman, Civil Engineering, Ministry of Public Building and Works.
- Joseph Leslie Wright, Senior Cypher Superintendent, Cabinet Office.
- Frederick Harold Yeo, Chief Engineer, MV Apollo, Bristol Steam Navigation Company Ltd.
- Charles Thomas Youles, lately Chief Instructor Dental Technician, Eastman Dental Hospital, London.
- Ethel Grace Whyte Young, General Secretary, Women's Royal Naval Service Benevolent Trust.

Diplomatic Service and Overseas List

- Captain James Clifford Anderson, Marine Training Officer, Marine Department, British Solomon Islands Protectorate.
- Emily Price Brown, Clerk, Public Information Office, Her Majesty's Embassy, Washington.
- William Boyd Brown. For services to the community in Gibraltar.
- Colin Fitch Campbell, Principal Cooperative Officer, Uganda.
- Charles Luke Cheng, JP. For services to the community in Fiji.
- Cheung Kam-tim. For services to the community in Hong Kong.
- Chow Yau. For services to the community in Hong Kong.
- Anna Violet Bryan Clarke, Higher Executive Officer, Ministry of Agriculture, Lesotho.
- Doris Violet Cole, lately Second Secretary and Consul, Her Majesty's Embassy, Bucharest.
- Daphne Mary Cooper, lately Shorthand Typist, British High Commission Residual Staff, Salisbury.
- Henry George Cooper, District Commissioner, Malawi.
- William Edward Cox. For services to the community in Saint Lucia.
- Maurice William Patrick Cronly-Dillon, lately Her Majesty's Consul (Commercial), Bari.
- Charles Bernard Dixon, lately Clerical Officer, British High Commission Residual Staff, Salisbury.
- Reginaldo Emanuel dos Remedios, Senior Land Assistant, New Territories Administration, Hong Kong.
- Mary Duffy (Sister Anselm), Headmistress, Mount Saint Mary's Secondary School, Namagunga, Uganda.
- Lucille Yvonne Eustace, Head Teacher, Kingstown Preparatory School, Saint Vincent.
- Harry Evans, British Vice-Consul, Palermo.
- The Reverend Thomas Frederick Fenton, Methodist Missionary in the Ivory Coast.
- Bryan Maurice Egbert Georges, Establishment Officer, Seychelles.
- Audrey Mary Gray, lately Shorthand Typist, Economic Survey Department, Hong Kong.
- The Reverend William David Grenfell, lately Baptist Minister in charge of Mission Station, Kibentele, Lower Congo.
- Raymond Hargreaves, Diplomatic Wireless Service Officer, Her Majesty's Embassy, Madrid.
- Peter Harold Barton Harris, lately Senior Lecturer in Art, Gaya College, Kota Kinabalu, Sabah.
- William John Hempsall, Senior Executive Officer, Uganda.
- Elaine Patricia Hoeflich, Personal Assistant to Her Majesty's Consul-General, New York.
- Edward Richard Charles Holland, lately First Secretary and Consul, Her Majesty's Embassy, Monrovia.
- William Jackson, Engineer, Gas Department, Public Utilities Board, Singapore.
- Leslie Walter James, Her Majesty's Consul, Beira.
- Ruth Edith Mae James, Registrar-General and Parliamentary Registrar, Bermuda.
- The Reverend Thomas Joseph Kane, Principal, Catholic Technical School, Ife, Nigeria.
- Gerald Archer Kent, Head of Commercial Section and British Vice-Consul, Boston.
- Iosefa Lameko, BEM, Headmaster, Ocean Island Primary School, Gilbert and Ellice Islands Colony.
- John Edward Alexander Frederick Lashford, British subject resident in Portugal.
- Lee Mang-pew. For services to education in Hong Kong.
- Leung Sik-hung, Assistant Superintendent of Urban Services, Hong Kong.
- Frederick Owen Lewis, Acting Superintendent of Police, Malaysia.
- Lo Ching-kan, Colony Commissioner, The Scout Association, Hong Kong.
- Ian Sinclair Lockhart, lately Archivist, Her Majesty's Embassy, Khartoum.
- Greaham Eric Louisy, Veterinary Officer, Saint Lucia.
- John Stuart McFall, Assistant Superintendent of Police, Lesotho.
- Frederick Mayer, lately Second Secretary (Clerk of Works), Her Majesty's Embassy, Buenos Aires.
- William Laurence Henry Weddell Morrell, Senior Executive Officer, Ministry of Education, Swaziland.
- John Raymond Muggeridge, Assistant Senior Executive Engineer, Nigeria.
- Harry Oscar Odell. For services to entertainment in Hong Kong.
- Benjamin Albert Olney, Principal Forester, Department of Forestry and Game, Malawi.
- Francisco Frederico Orio, lately Veterinary Officer, British Honduras.
- Hugh Gordon Parrett, Chief Superintendent of Police, Nigeria.
- The Reverend James John Henry Payne, Chaplain in charge, Saint Saviour's Church, Lagos, Nigeria.
- Arthur Oliphy Pemberton. For services to the community in Dominica.
- Vera Alice Penfold, Secretary to the President and Cabinet, Malawi.
- Michael Charles Stuart Philip, lately Assistant Secretary, Ministry of Agriculture, Kenya.
- John Clifton Radix, MC, lately District Medical Officer, Grenada.
- Mohammed Ramzan, General Secretary, Public Employees Union, Fiji.
- Mary Alice Elinor Richards, United Kingdom citizen lately resident in Zambia.
- The Reverend Ronald Augustine Stanley Roberts, TD. For educational and welfare service in the Lebanon.
- Enid Leona Scatliffe, Supervisor of Primary Schools, British Virgin Islands.
- Stanley John Spicer, lately Second Secretary, Her Majesty's Embassy, Moscow.
- Arthur Richard Spurgin, British subject resident in the Congo.
- Yvonne May Stevens, Director, Red Cross (Nevis Branch), Saint ChristopherNevis-Anguilla.
- Margaret Mary Stone, Sister (Special duties), Kumi-Ongino Leprosy Settlement, Uganda.
- Leonard Thomas Thorn Sullivan, lately Chief Engineer, University College Hospital, Ibadan, Nigeria.
- Charles Bradlaugh Thompson, British subject resident in the United States of America.
- Edgar Alexander Vedova, British Consul, Salonika.
- Marjorie Vinson. For services to education and to the community in the Falkland Islands.
- Michael Wadiaeff, lately Senior Russian Interpreter, British Military Government, Berlin.
- Allen William Wakeford, British subject resident in Cuba.
- Jeremy George Dillon Warburton, lately Deputy State Financial Secretary, Sarawak.
- Caroline Weber, British subject resident in Germany.
- Bertie John Wheatley, BEM, Registrar, British High Commission, Kuala Lumpur.
- Willard Wheatley. For services to education and to the community in the British Virgin Islands.
- George Arnold Whitaker, MC, United Kingdom citizen resident in India.
- Norman Beardmore Macqueen Whitley, Principal Executive Officer, Establishment Branch, Hong Kong.
- Harold Clifford Williams, Residual Affairs Officer, Her Majesty's Embassy, Aden.
- John Bryan Wilson, lately Principal, Staff Training Institute, Swaziland.
- William Angus Walter Wilson, Chief Electrical and Mechanical Engineer, Northern Nigeria.
- The Reverend Peter Wong. For services to education in Hong Kong.

State of New South Wales

- Aubrey Kenneth Cantrill. For services to primary industry.
- Michael George Craig. For services to the community.
- Margaret Enid Grace Davis. For services to the community.
- John Alfred Meynett Grant. For services to ex-servicemen.
- John Thomas Jennings. For services to ex-servicemen.
- George Walter Allerton Lowe. For services to sport, particularly cricket.
- Eileen Haynes McSpeerin. For services to the community.
- Reginald Andrew O'Neill. For services to the community.
- Councillor Thomas Richard Pendlebury. For services to local government.
- Daniel Joseph Saap, Private Secretary to Minister for Housing and Co-operative Societies.
- Emily Sachisthal. For philanthropic services.
- Bernice Eileen Smith, District Nursing Sister in Bega.
- John Clifford Thorne. For services to the community.
- Hilda Zelinka. For services to the community, especially to children.

State of Victoria

- Dorothy Catherine Black. For services to child welfare.
- Councillor Thomas William Dalziell, of Emerald. For services to local government and to the community.
- Councillor Alfred Herbert Chandler, of Seville. For services to local government and to the community.
- John Kenneth Finlay. For services to local government.
- John Alfred Garlick, of Moorabbin. For services to the Returned Services League.
- Councillor John Richard Golightly, of Queenscliff. For services to local government.
- Hilda Lanagan, of Rupanyup. For services to the community.
- John Henry Morris, JP. For services to local government and to the community.
- William Bennett Rashleigh, of Glen Iris. For services to music.
- Enid Isobel Paterson. For services to the community, particularly to elderly citizens.
- Myrtle Turner, of Buninyong. For services to the community.
- Councillor Stanley William Waldron. For services to local government and to the community.
- Wilson Roy Wheeler, of Windsor. For services to nature study and conservation in Victoria.

State of Queensland

- Francis Edmond Atwood, Senior Sergeant, Queensland Police Force.
- Phyllis May Danaher, of Brisbane. For services to the artistic life of the community, particularly ballet.
- William Alexander Rencher Harris, DCM. For services to the community, particularly to the Returned Services League.
- Cecil St. Lawrence Holdcroft, Chairman, Herberton Shire Council.
- Christopher Brand Nugent Nixon, of Brisbane. For services to the Scouting Movement.
- Jeanie Clement Rennie, of Brisbane. For services to youth, particularly with the Young Women's Christian Association.
- Percival James Savage, DSO, of Brookfield. For services to The Queensland fruit and vegetable industry.
- Clive William Taylor, MB, BS. For services to the community, particularly in the field of medicines.

State of South Australia

- Lesley Ernest Favell. For services to cricket.
- Deirdre Frances Jordan (Sister Mary Campion). For services to education.
- Dorothy Riddle. For services to education and youth welfare
- Linda Clarice Rosewarne, of Kadina. For services to the community.

State of Western Australia

- Francis William Avenell, JP. For services in the field of Pharmacy.
- Francis George Bradshaw. For services to education.
- Lucy Howell (Mrs. Date). For services in the field of music.
- Donald Henry Ferguson, JP. For services to the Community.
- John Juan, Radio Announcer, Australian Broadcasting Commission.

State of Tasmania

- Ida Lois Birchall, MB, BS. For services to medicine.
- Elizabeth Perkins. For services to the community, particularly to the Country Women's Association.
- The Very Reverend Father Edmund Michael Roche. For services to the community.
- Donald Mark Smith, JP. For services to local government and to the community.

=== Order of the Companions of Honour (CH) ===
- Sir Adrian Cedric Boult. For services to Music.
- The Right Honourable Robert Michael Maitland Stewart, MP, Member of Parliament for East Fulham, 1945–1955, and for Fulham since 1955. A Lord Commissioner of HM Treasury, 1945–1946; Comptroller of HM Household, 1946; Vice-Chamberlain of HM Household, 1947; Parliamentary Under-secretary of State, War Office, and Financial Secretary, 1947–1951. Parliamentary Secretary, Ministry of Supply, 1951. Secretary of State for Education and Science, 1964–1965. Secretary of State for Foreign Affairs, 1965–1966. First Secretary and Secretary of State for Economic Affairs, 1966–1967; First Secretary of State, 1967–1968. Secretary of State for Foreign Affairs, 1968; Secretary of State for Foreign and Commonwealth Affairs since October 1968.

=== Companion of the Imperial Service Order (ISO) ===
Home Civil Service

- Alan Francis Brocklebank, Chief Executive Officer, Ministry of Agriculture, Fisheries and Food.
- James Crawford, Chief Executive Officer, Department of Health and Social Security.
- John Campbell Fletcher, Principal, Board of Customs and Excise.
- George Frederick Kinton Grant, Controller, Tithe Redemption Office, Board of Inland Revenue.
- Evelyn Hanson, Grade 2 Officer, Department of Employment and Productivity.
- Donald George Hunt, Assistant Master, Court of Protection, Lord Chancellor's Department.
- Glyn Jeremiah, Senior Assistant District Auditor, Ministry of Housing and Local Government.
- Richard Reginald Jury, Temporary Acting Constructor, Ministry of Defence.
- Cyril James Lambourne, MBE, Head Postmaster, Head Post Office, Chester.
- John Charles Lancaster, Chief Executive Officer, Department of Health and Social Security.
- Mary McColl Langwell, Principal Inspector, Board of Inland Revenue.
- Ethel Frances Musto, Chief Executive Officer, Department of Health and Social Security.
- Temple Clifford John Ovenston, Deputy Chief Scientific Officer, Ministry of Defence.
- Sydney James Perigo, lately Chief Executive Officer, Home Office.
- William David Rusbatch, Chief Executive Officer, Ministry of Technology.
- Cyril Bryan Sidney Seaman, Chief Executive Officer, Ministry of Defence.
- Kenneth Shuttleworth, Chief Executive Officer, Department of Health and Social Security.
- Stanley George Silhan, Senior Civil Engineer, Ministry of Public Building and Works.
- Reginald Arthur Smith, Senior Chief Executive Officer, Ministry of Power.
- Albert John Thompson, Controller (Chief Regional Engineer), London Telecommunications Region, Post Office.
- James Torrance, Chief Executive Officer, Scottish Development Department.
- Eric Edward Warn, lately Assistant Chief Labour Management Officer, Ministry of Technology.

Diplomatic Service and Overseas List

- James Ronald Firth, lately Commissioner for Housing, Hong Kong.
- Ninian William Royer, lately Postmaster-General, Dominica.
- Stephen Young, Government Printer, Hong Kong.

State of New South Wales

- Launcelot John Green, lately Chief Regional Extension Services, New South Wales Department of Agriculture.

State of Victoria

- Frank Morres Read, lately Director of Agriculture.

State of Queensland

- Howard Charles Hinton, Public Service Commissioner.

=== British Empire Medal (BEM) ===
Military Division

Royal Navy

- Chief Airman (AHI) Roy Edwin Bailey, L/FX 875620.
- Chief Communications Yeoman Claud Baker, J 988647, Royal Naval Reserve.
- Colour Sergeant Eric Joseph Blyth, PLY/ X5332, Royal Marines.
- Chief Ordnance Electrical Mechanician (L) Charles Henry Brown, P/MX 858887.
- Leading Ordnance Electrical Mechanic John Anthony Bull, C/MX 803734.
- Chief Petty Officer Writer Frank Duncan Cousins, P/MX 774297.
- Chief Sailmaker Vernon Charles Croxon Debenham, P/JX 620358.
- Chief Mechanician Roy Robert Reginald Dunbar, D/KX 524160.
- Chief Petty Officer William Richard Dunlevy, D/JX 147895.
- Chief Petty Officer Writer William Frank Edwards, D/MX 834831.
- Chief Petty Officer David Maurice Evans, D/JX 160661.
- Chief Air Fitter (AE) Edwin Wyndham Fidler, L/FX 104749.
- Chief Aircraft Artificer (O) Robert Percy Fyles, L/FX 669385.
- Chief Engine Room Artificer Arthur Edward Goodburn, D/MX 708066.
- Quartermaster Sergeant Bugler Donald Norman Hawdon, CH/X 4038, Royal Marines.
- Electrical Artificer 1st Class Ronald Hunter, J 988712, Royal Naval Reserve.
- Chief Wren Steward (O) Bertha Jane Jones, 11188, Women's Royal Naval Service.
- Chief Radio Supervisor Michael Wallace Kenyon, D/JX 661190.
- Chief Petty Officer Raymond George Notley, P/JX 159348.
- Chief Petty Officer (UW1) Charles Partington, D/JX 912520 (formerly on loan to the Royal Malaysian Navy).
- Aircraft Mechanician 1st Class (A&E) Sidney Malcolm Partridge, L/FX 838114.
- Chief Petty Officer (GI) Robert Rainer, P/JX 144112.
- Quartermaster Sergeant Frank Rigby, PLY/X 5059, Royal Marines.
- Chief Communications Yeoman George Thomas Warren Ryrie, D/JX 156879.
- Chief Petty Officer Coxswain Anthony George Smith, P/JX 661351.
- Chief Shipwright Ronald Taylor, P/MX 855960.
- Chief Ordnance Electrician Ivor John Tope, D/MX 856385.
- Chief Petty Officer Stores Accountant Neville Trainer, P/MX 825878.
- Chief Petty Officer Medical Assistant George Charles Troke, P/MX 57127.
- Chief Mechanician Ronald Milford Weston, P/KX 901040.

Army

- 22296401 Staff Sergeant Richard Allcock, Royal Corps of Signals.
- 22290927 Sergeant Keith Deamer Banwell, The Parachute Regiment, Territorial and Army Volunteer Reserve.
- 22970879 Staff Sergeant Donald Charles Bickell, Army Physical Training Corps.
- 22562072 Staff Sergeant James Boyle, Royal Army Ordnance Corps (now retired).
- 21001419 Warrant Officer Class II (acting) Janusz Brochwicz-Lewinski, The Queen's Own Hussars.
- 21145155 Sergeant Gangaram Chhetri, Gurkha Transport Regiment.
- 19040817 Warrant Officer Class II (acting) Maurice Cox, Corps of Royal Engineers.
- 22998466 Staff Sergeant Richard Crossfield, Royal Army Ordnance Corps.
- 22511404 Corporal Robert George Cushley, The Royal Irish Rangers.
- 11598 Staff Sergeant Saviour Debrincat, Royal Malta Artillery.
- 2356627 Sergeant (acting) Henry Harding Dempster, The Parachute Regiment.
- 22771310 Staff Sergeant Michael John Dunmall, Royal Corps of Signals.
- 23992853 Corporal David Charles Giles, Royal Electrical and Mechanical Engineers.
- 22221983 Staff Sergeant William Gordon, The Royal Anglian Regiment, Territorial and Army Volunteer Reserve.
- 3197860 Staff Sergeant Robert Greig, The Kings Own Scottish Borderers.
- 22265559 Staff Sergeant (acting) Raymond John Haskell, Royal Corps of Signals.
- 22848952 Staff Sergeant Edward John Hills, Royal Corps of Transport.
- 22806995 Staff Sergeant Robert Walter Lambdon, Royal Corps of Transport.
- 7961834 Staff Sergeant Hedley Lock, Intelligence Corps.
- 22550262 Staff Sergeant John Lawrence McDonnell, Royal Army Ordnance Corps.
- 22999255 Staff Sergeant Roy Mawdesley, Royal Electrical and Mechanical Engineers.
- 5621336 Sergeant Albert Edward Midson, Wessex Volunteers, Territorial and Army Volunteer Reserve.
- 21012134 Warrant Officer Class II (Local) John Patrick Murphy, Royal Irish Rangers.
- 22840313 Sergeant (acting) Murdo Nicolson, Royal Highland Fusiliers.
- 22530229 Sergeant Herbert Oswald Perkins, The Parachute Regiment.
- 22322274 Staff Sergeant Philip Poole, Royal Army Dental Corps.
- 19036525 Staff Sergeant Thomas Philip Ryan, Royal Irish Rangers.
- 22134666 Staff Sergeant Thomas David Slater, 4th (Territorial) Battalion, The Border Regiment, Territorial and Army Volunteer Reserve.
- 6412549 Staff Sergeant Norman Charles Sparks, The Parachute Regiment.
- 22839428 Staff Sergeant Ronald Harold Stevenson, Royal Electrical and Mechanical Engineers.
- 23509688 Staff Sergeant Brian Edwin Thompson, Grenadier Guards.
- 23534608 Sergeant Clifford Henry Joseph Watts, Royal Army Ordnance Corps.
- 23572144 Staff Sergeant Roy Westworth, The Lancashire Regiment (Prince of Wales's Volunteers).
- 2741708 Warrant Officer Class II (acting) Raymond Clifford Winston, Welsh Guards (now retired).

Overseas Award

- Platoon Sergeant Whitfield Leopold Flowers, British Honduras Volunteer Guard.

Royal Air Force

- K3503243 Flight Sergeant Ronald Ashton.
- D1348534 Flight Sergeant (Acting Warrant Officer) Richard McNeil Browne.
- L0527279 Flight Sergeant Louvain Donald Case.
- X2284341 Flight Sergeant John Conn.
- X4019S49 Flight Sergeant Idris Treharne Davies.
- E4013404 Flight Sergeant (Acting Warrant Officer) David Gerald Evans.
- L0577819 Flight Sergeant (Acting Warrant Officer) William Dalkin Hetherington.
- K2458882 Flight Sergeant Sidney Keith Howard.
- F0575526 Flight Sergeant Jack Francis Moore.
- R0577740 Acting Flight Sergeant Michael John Berridge.
- K4084445 Acting Flight Sergeant Edward Albert Bowers.
- F3101014 Acting Flight Sergeant Ambrose Bullement.
- U0574154 Acting Flight Sergeant George Gerald Hudson.
- Q0585761 Chief Technician Ronald Burton Bentley.
- W3500763 Chief Technician Christopher Blackburn Briggs.
- F0584042 Chief Technician William John Cundy.
- K0585509 Chief Technician Peter James Dowler.
- E4063441 Chief Technician Michael George Ellis.
- Q1920435 Chief Technician David Michael Peters Float.
- U4176516 Chief Technician Ian Frederick Gronbach.
- H0582347 Chief Technician David Leon Haines.
- T4106473 Chief Technician Charles Vernon Ralphs.
- J4078764 Chief Technician Richard George Sharp.
- Q1928952 Sergeant Leslie Alan Blake.
- W4061068 Sergeant John Wilfred Bowes.
- K3500934 Sergeant Alistair Campbell Brodie.
- Y0589342 Sergeant Eric Wilson Fraser.
- K41SS349 Sergeant Edgar Maurice Jones.
- C4080041 Sergeant Edwin Ralph Hill-Jones.
- R2257507 Sergeant James O'Brien Masson.
- K3121209 Sergeant Colin Newton.
- J0880825 Sergeant Gladys Gertrude Evelyn Pirnie, Women's Royal Air Force.
- G2714142 Sergeant Donald Roy Snuggs.
- Q1596776 Sergeant George Wrightson.
- B2684264 Acting Sergeant Alistair Pirie.

Civil Division

United Kingdom

- Ronald Acaster, Lorry Driver, Hull & Glasgow Road Carriers Ltd.
- Robert Ambrose, Hydrographic Surveying Assistant, Port of London Authority.
- Pamela M. Anderson, Member of Kensington District Office (Meals-on-Wheels), Women's Royal Voluntary Service.
- Beatrice Alice Ashby, Senior Machine Operator, Board of Customs and Excise.
- Alice Asher, Welfare Worker, Derbyshire Branch, British Red Cross Society.
- Grace Audus, Kitchen Superintendent, Mile End Hospital, London.
- John Baird, Foreman Carpenter, Ministry of Public Building and Works.
- Frederick Edward Baker, Senior Foreman, Essex Division, North Thames Gas Board.
- Paul Barbara, Head Messenger, HM Naval Base, Malta.
- Thomas William Barnard, Divisional Officer, Ludlow Ambulance Division, Shropshire, St. John Ambulance Brigade.
- George Barrow, Head Foreman Coppersmith, Vickers Ltd., (Shipbuilding Group), Barrow.
- William Henry Beckett, Turner, Area Maintenance Workshops, West Midlands Gas Board.
- Celia Nellie Bell, Centre Organiser, Norton Urban District, Women's Royal Voluntary Service.
- Albert Ernest Bentley, Inspector, West Mercia Special Constabulary.
- Ann Bergin, Honorary Collector, Street Savings Group, Salford.
- Albert Billett, Instructional Officer, Grade III, Department of Employment and Productivity.
- Albert Blackwell, lately Moulder, William Mills Ltd., Wednesbury.
- Harry Blackwell, Moulder, William Mills Ltd., Wednesbury.
- Margaret Bolton, lately Food Flying Squad Convoy Organiser, Clitheroe, Women's Royal Voluntary Service.
- Lawrence Joseph Boyle, Fireman, Manchester Fire Brigade.
- Edward Bracewell, Chief Demonstrator, J. Parkinson & Son, Shipley.
- Leonard Arthur Bradshaw, Sergeant Major Instructor, Leicester, Northampton and Rutland Army Cadet Force.
- Gladys Catherine Breakwell, Auxiliary Postwoman, Enville, Staffordshire.
- Harry Brearley, lately Driver/Messenger, Regional Headquarters, Leeds, Ministry of Agriculture, Fisheries and Food.
- Leslie Thomas William Briers, Driver, Saltley Depot, Birmingham, London Midland Region, British Railways Board.
- Thomas Brocklehurst, Underground Taskworker, Thoresby Colliery, North Nottinghamshire Area, National Coal Board.
- John Callaghan, Director of Junior Training, Scottish Police College.
- John Winston Cantwell, Bedroom Steward, SS Oriana, P. & O. Steam Navigation Company.
- James Ernest Cappi, Warehouse Supervisor, Midland Silicones Ltd., Barry.
- William Cartwright, Inspector, Motor Car Division, Rolls-Royce Ltd.
- Alfred George Challis, Messenger, Newsroom, British Broadcasting Corporation.
- Wilfred Chambers, Office Keeper Grade II, Royal Courts of Justice.
- Albert Chapman, Yard Manager, Movements Department, Whitemoor, Eastern Region, British Railways Board.
- Eleanor Clark, Matron, Rochester Borstal.
- George Alfred Collison, Assistant Inspector, Head Post Office, Sutton.
- Edwin Charles Copsey, Technical Grade II, Home Office.
- Thomas Cecil Cousins, Driver, Metropolitan Police Office.
- William Cowe, Janitor, John Logic Baird Primary School, Helensburgh.
- Charles Edward Crockwell, Experimental Worker Grade I, Royal Armament Research and Development Establishment, Fort Halstead.
- Joseph Wilfred Crooks, Farm Foreman, Liverton Mines, Yorkshire.
- William Edward Curtis, Chief Inspector, Marshall Sons & Company Ltd., Gainsborough.
- Arthur Dangerfield, Postman (Driver), Western District Office, London.
- Edith May Daniels, Honorary Collector, Street Savings Group, Nuneaton.
- David Glyndwr Davies, Senior Engineering Foreman, North Glamorgan District, South Wales Electricity Board.
- Frederick Charles Davis, lately Bedroom Steward, SS Sylvania, General Service Contracts, Merchant Navy.
- George Dawson, Service Supervisor, Lincolnshire Division, East Midlands Gas Board.
- Frank Dean, Head Foreman, Primary Rolling Mill, Brown Bayley Steels Ltd., Sheffield.
- Leonard William Dean, Assistant Superintendent, British Aircraft Corporation Ltd., Preston Division.
- John Dewar, Station Assistant, Garelochhead, Scottish Region, British Railways Board.
- Millicent Dixon, Honorary Collector, Street Savings Group, Bishop Auckland.
- David Donaldson, Checker, Dundee West Freight Depot, Scottish Area, Sundries Division, National Freight Corporation.
- Frank Thomas Dossett, Schoolkeeper, Crown Woods School, Eltham.
- John Eardley, Turner, R.N. Torpedo Factory, Alexandria.
- Alfred Vaughan Easterbrook, General Foreman, Nantgarw Coke Ovens, South Western Region, Coal Products Division, National Coal Board.
- Rachel Elias, Joint Deputy County Organiser, South Caernarvonshire, Women's Royal Voluntary Service.
- Graham Anthony Robert Elliott, Constable, Liverpool and Bootle Constabulary.
- Thomas Robert English, lately Civilian Instructor Grade III, School of Military Engineering.
- Robert Arthur Fennell, Air Traffic Control Assistant Grade I, Heathrow Airport, Board of Trade.
- James Fitzgerald, Paperkeeper, HM Stationery Office.
- Herbert John Fordham, Goods Yard Foreman, Movements Department, Norwich, Eastern Region, British Railways Board.
- Daisy Florence Fosdike, Honorary Collector, Street Savings Group, Southwark.
- James Fox, Laboratory Assistant, Ministry of Finance, Northern Ireland.
- Owen Gallagher, Senior Foreman, Associated Lead Manufacturers Ltd.
- Florence Mary Game, Leading Hand Laundry Hand, Explosives Research and Development Establishment, Waltham Abbey.
- Charles Richard Gardner, Civilian Instructor, No. 34F (Balham) Squadron, Air Training Corps.
- Gerald Percy Garlick, Works Superintendent, A.P. Metalcraft Ltd., Coventry.
- Henry Garrett, Chargeman of Stokers, HMS Dryad.
- Beatrice Lydia Gates, Sub Postmistress, Ivinghoe, Bedfordshire.
- John Geddes, Principal Foreman of Stores, No. 25 Maintenance Unit, RAF Hartlebury.
- Anne Mary Heaney-Glenn, Group Officer, Cheshire Fire Brigade.
- Bernard Glover, Gasholder Station Attendant, Wakefield District, North Eastern Gas Board.
- Reginald Henry Glover, Chief Cook Grade I, Royal Military Academy, Sandhurst.
- Lloyd Gladstone Gough, Engineering Technical Class Officer Grade III, Signals Research and Development Establishment, Christchurch, Hampshire.
- Richard Llewellyn Gough, Foreman, Remploy Factory, Leeds.
- William Granger, Head Foreman, Blading Department, John Brown Engineering, (Clydebank) Ltd.
- Douglas William John Grazier, Production Services Engineer, Work Study Department, Dowty Rotol Ltd.
- William Ernest Green, lately Stores Supervisory Grade IV. Northern Command Bridging Camp, Ripon.
- John Hall, Civilian Instructor, No. 215 (Swansea) Squadron, Air Training Corps.
- Ernest Albert Hancock, Installation Foreman, Equipment Department, British Broadcasting Corporation.
- Olive Emilie Jane Harding, Process and General Supervisory Grade II (Established) Inspection Division, South East Region, Ministry of Technology.
- George Harrison, Herd Manager, Great Bardfield, Essex. For services to the pig industry.
- Kenneth McLennan Hay, Overseer, Head Post Office, Edinburgh.
- Charles Leslie Hayes, Instructional Officer Grade I, Department of Employment and Productivity.
- Alice Hicks, Housemother, Local Authority Children's Home, Barnstaple, Devon.
- Fred Hill, Water Softener Plant Attendant, Sculcoates Power Station, North Eastern Region, Central Electricity Generating Board.
- William Oswald Hobbs, Engineering Technical Grade II, Royal Ordnance Factory, Cardiff.
- Edward Holliday, Maintenance Supervisor, Albright & Wilson Ltd., Marchon Division.
- Harry Houghton, Chargeman of Engine Fitters, Technical Class Grade III, HM Dockyard, Portsmouth.
- Annie Hughes, Honorary Collector, Street Savings Group, Pontypool.
- Fanny Hutchinson, Centre Organiser. Windsor Rural District, Women's Royal Voluntary Service.
- John Michael Innes, Chief Officer I, Parkhurst Prison.
- Desmond Augustus George Isaksson, Pest Operator, Montgomeryshire, Ministry of Agriculture, Fisheries and Food.
- William Gerald Izzard, Assistant Divisional Officer, East Sussex Fire Brigade.
- Bernard Daniel Jack, Aerodrome Fire Officer Grade I, Belfast (Aldergrove) Airport, Board of Trade.
- Frank James, Instructional Officer, Grade 1, Department of Employment and Productivity.
- Lemuel James, Cylinder Foundry Foreman, Black Clawson International Ltd., Newport, Monmouthshire.
- Leonard Sturman Jervis, Forgeman, Steel Peech & Tozer, British Steel Corporation.
- Ernest Jolly, Fitter Mechanical Grade I, Ministry of Public Building and Works.
- Francis Edward Jones, General Foreman, Glamorgan County Council.
- Thomas Henry Jones, lately Underground Roadway Repair Worker, Ifton Colliery, North Western Area, National Coal Board.
- Wallace Ernest Keam, lately Head Security Guard, British Embassy, Amman.
- Joseph Kidd, lately Staff Foreman, Ferguson Brothers Ltd.
- Frederick Robert Knight, Process and General Supervisory Grade V, School of Infantry, Hythe.
- John Lewis, Steward to Lord High Commissioner at the Palace of Holyroodhouse.
- Frederick Liddle, Works Foreman, EverReady Company (Gt. Britain) Ltd., Walthamstow.
- George Herbert Lines, Head Porter, Royal Berkshire Hospital, Reading.
- Joseph Livori, Canteen Manager, Navy, Army and Air Force Institutes, HMS Diamond.
- Ivor Llewellyn, Warden, St. Athan Boys Village, Glamorganshire.
- Raymond Sidney Sims Lodge, Technical Works Engineer III, Government Communication Headquarters, Foreign and Commonwealth Office.
- Albert George Long, Commissionaire, Head Office, British Steel Corporation.
- Alexander Lovie, Principal Lightkeeper, Turnberry Lighthouse.
- Thomas William Luscombe, Building Supervisor, Horton Hospital, Epsom.
- Duncan McCallum, Motor Mechanic, Campbeltown Argyllshire Lifeboat, Royal National Lifeboat Institution.
- William Leonard Mace, Supervising Collector, Camberwell District, South Eastern Gas Board.
- Samuel Joseph McElveen, Parcels Distributor, John Smillie Ltd., Haulage Contractor, Glasgow.
- Finlay Mackenzie, Signalman, Watford Junction, London Midland Region, British Railways Board.
- William Macleod, Head Gardener "A", France, Northern Region, Commonwealth War Graves Commission.
- James Meads, Special Works Foreman, County Surveyor's Department, Nottinghamshire County Council.
- Margaret Edith Membury, Woman Chief Inspector, Glamorgan Constabulary.
- Edgar Albert Alfonse Micallef, Air Traffic Assistant Grade I, RAF Luqa, Malta.
- Edith Wray Milburn, Cook-Supervisor, North Riding School Meals Service.
- Henry Alfred James Miller, lately Boatswain, MV Haparangi, New Zealand Shipping Company Ltd.
- James Eric Mills, Technician I, General Post Office.
- Ronald James Mitchell, Site Manager, J. Longley & Company Ltd., Sussex.
- Isaac Bremner Moar, Sub-Postmaster, Auxiliary Postman and Mail Contractor, Hoy, Stromness, Orkney.
- William Moffat, Ambulance Member, No. 15 (East Ham) Ambulance Division, St. John Ambulance Brigade.
- James Moore, General Foreman, G. Houlton & Sons Ltd.
- Thomas Bartholomew Moore, School Staff Instructor, Harrow School, Combined Cadet Force.
- Harold Vale Moreton, Boatswain, RRS Discovery.
- John James New, Foreman Craftsman, Public Record Office.
- Percy James Newby, Preparator, Commonwealth Institute of Entomology.
- Thomas Hillman Nixon, Roller, Barrow Steel Works, British Steel Corporation.
- William Oliver, lately Storeman, Territorial and Auxiliary Forces Association for the County of Lanark.
- James Albert Pamment, lately Wilton Carpet Weaver, Firth Carpets Ltd., Brighouse, Yorkshire.
- Ethel Ibbotson Pardoe. For services to elderly people in Worcestershire.
- Frederick Stephen Parsons, Coal Trimmer, Blyth Harbour Commission.
- Valerie Grace Pearson, Chief Supervisor, London Telecommunications Region.
- Kathleen Mary Penrith, Manageress, Cippenham Hostel, Department of Employment and Productivity.
- Harold John Pepper, lately Head Chancery Guard, British Embassy, Saigon.
- Alfred John Peters, Head Foreman, Main Assembly Shop, Vickers Ltd. (Engineering Group), Crayford, Kent.
- Marjorie Philpot, Honorary Collector, Street Savings Group, Bedford.
- Thomas William Poulter, Passenger Guard, Ore, Southern Region, British Railways Board.
- Ernest Henry Pullin, Maintenance Foreman, Universal-Matthey Products Ltd.
- John Edward Radford, Test House Manager, Tubes Ltd., Aston, Birmingham.
- James Alexander Reid, Ambulance Driver, Aboyne Hospital, Aberdeenshire.
- James William Robertson, Ingot Soaking Pit Heater, Hartlepool Works, British Steel Corporation.
- Laurence Henry Robertson, Naval Auxiliary Officer, R.N. Auxiliary Service, HMS Graham, Glasgow.
- William Robertson, Company Commandant, Ayr Company, St. Andrew's Ambulance Corps.
- Geoffrey Thomas Rose, Senior Supervisor, Avonmouth Terminal, Shell-Mex & B.P. Ltd.
- Catherine Sutherland Wood Ross, Telephone Operator, R.N. Auxiliary Service, Lossiemouth.
- John Round, Underhand Roller, Messrs. W. Wesson & Company Ltd., Moxley, Wednesbury, Staffordshire.
- George David Rushby, Chargehand–Prototype Shop, W. Vinten Ltd., Bury St. Edmunds.
- Walter Eustace Rushby, lately Skilled Craftsman, Engineering Support Division, Research Group, Harwell, United Kingdom Atomic Energy Authority.
- William Semple, Training Officer, Killoch Colliery, Scottish South Area, National Coal Board.
- Robert James Sim, Chief Observer, No. 5 Group, Royal Observer Corps.
- John Francis Sinclair, Chief Warder, British Museum.
- Mota Singh, Clerk of Works, Singapore, Ministry of Public Building and Works.
- Sylvia Portia Stagey, Housemother, Local Authority Children's Home, Oxford.
- Eric Staniforth, lately Head Observer, Royal Observer Corps.
- May Stevens, lately Chargehand/Supervisor, G. F. Lovell & Company Ltd., Newport, Monmouthshire.
- Leslie William Strowger, Senior Scientific Assistant, Fisheries Laboratory, Lowestoft, Ministry of Agriculture, Fisheries and Food.
- Gwendoline Tankard, Centre Organiser, Blackwell Rural District, Women's Royal Voluntary Service.
- Cyril Taylor, Yeoman Gaoler, HM Tower of London.
- Patrick Duncan Taylor, Sub-Officer, North Eastern Fire Brigade (Scotland).
- Roy Taylor, Station Officer, Lincolnshire (Lindsey) Fire Brigade.
- Gweneveve Margery Trevett, Honorary Collector, Street Savings Group, Sherborne.
- Joseph Ivor Turnell, Field Development Engineer, Strachan & Henshaw Ltd., Bristol.
- Elizabeth Mary Turner, Sub Postmistress, Whittington Moor, Chesterfield, Derbyshire.
- Arthur Christopher Chard Waite, Senior Messenger, Ministry of Housing and Local Government.
- Lawrence Walker, Senior Plant Operator, Preston Bulk Plant, Esso Petroleum.
- Edward Alfred Ward, Cable Jointer, Southern Electricity Board.
- Leonard Warne, Dental Surgery Attendant, R.M. Barracks, Plymouth.
- Gerald Watson, Mains Foreman, Lancaster District, North Western Electricity Board.
- William Alexander Watson, Embodiment Loan Officer, G.E.C. Ltd., Coventry.
- Mildred Frances Wheeler. For service to the community, particularly with the St. John's Ambulance Brigade, in Chesham.
- Arthur Whitby, Textile Worker, Remploy Factory, Salford.
- Ernest Edley White, Land Drainage Supervisor, Alford Internal Drainage Board (Lincolnshire).
- Evelyn Phyllis White, Chief Supervisor (Telephones), Post Office, Walsall.
- Albert Augustus Wilmer, Tradesman (Plumber and Welder), Surveyor's Workshop, Metropolitan Police.
- George Wilson, lately Foreman Plumber, Leeds Area, Yorkshire Electricity Board.
- John Johnstone Wilson, Carpenter, SS S.A. Vaal, British & Commonwealth Shipping Company Ltd.
- Elizabeth Blair Wood, Chief Officer (Class II), Greenock Female Borstal Institution.
- William Wotherspoon, Sergeant, Metropolitan Police.
- Frank Wrathmall, Foreman, Ministry of Public Building and Works.
- Brian Harry Wright, Technician T.5 Grade, County Surveyor's Department, Devon County Council.
- Olive Wright, Deputy County Organiser, Worcestershire, Women's Royal Voluntary Service.
- Robert Wylde, Engine Room Storekeeper, SS Pacific Reliance, General Service Contracts, Merchant Navy.
- John Clifford Young, Chief Petty Officer, SS Asprella, Shell Tankers (U.K.) Ltd.
- Richard Charles Young, Assistant Grade II, Department of Health and Social Security.

State of New South Wales

- William Forbes Alexander. For services to local government.
- Robert Wilson Colvin, Officer-in-Charge, Photographic Laboratory, Department of Lands.
- Catherine Conway. For services to the community in Thirroul.
- James Frederick Gray, lately Production Superintendent, New South Wales Government Printing Office.
- Jack Hilton Holman, MC. For services to industry.
- Annie Keehan. For services to the community in Canterbury.
- Gordon Bell McKenzie. For services to ex-servicemen.
- Harold Harding Mattick. For services to local government in Nambucca.
- Hugh Nisbet Miller, Controller, Civil Defence Organisation, Clarence River.
- Ada Winifred Morgan, Matron, Hornsby and District Hospital.
- Norman Herbert Pack, Colonel, Salvation Army.
- Ernest Francis Pedersen. For services to the community in Glebe.
- George Podger. For services to the community.
- Alan Milton Porter. For services to ex-servicemen.
- Kathleen Lorraine Riach, Divisional Secretary, Junior Red Cross in New South Wales.
- William Charles Sendall Sainsbery. For services to the community in Moulamein.
- Margaret Spencer. For services to ex-servicemen.
- William John Thomas. For services to the community in Parramatta.
- Elma Weatherstone, lately Matron, Gladesville Hospital, Sydney.
- Nicholas Robertson Wilson. For services to the community.

State of Victoria

- Richard Duke, Head of Works Staff, National Art Gallery.
- Harry Jackson Gilgryst. For services with the Corps of Commissionaires.
- Hilma Jenkins, Senior Typist, Department of Crown Lands and Survey.
- Thomas Philip Lawson, Watchman, Exhibition Buildings, State of Victoria.
- Charles Donald Laycock, Supervisor, National Gallery of Victoria.
- Benjamin Henry Magnus. For services with the Corps of Commissionaires.
- James Matthew Maxwell. For services to the community in Whittlesea.
- Lucy May Renkin, Officer-in-Charge, "Warrawee" Rest Centre.

State of Queensland

- John Farquhar, lately Curator, Brisbane Cricket Ground.

State of South Australia

- Robert Francis Quinn Huie, Detective Sergeant, South Australian Police Force.
- John Walter Quinn, Lord Mayor's Orderly, Adelaide City Council.

State of Western Australia

- Gwenllian Collier Forsyth. For services to the community.
- Matilda Adelaide Gard. For services to the mentally sick.
- George Robert Gilmore. For services to ex-servicemen.
- William Walter Nichols. For services to the community in Marble Bar.
- Philip Frederick Owens. For services to youth.
- Kathleen Twomey. For services to the blind.

Overseas Territories

- Cheung Tor, Senior Ambulanceman, Fire Services Department, Hong Kong.
- Chu Chiu, Sergeant, Hong Kong Police Force.
- Li Hing, Foreman Class II, Urban Services Department, Hong Kong.
- Alfred William Ratcliffe, Senior Boarding Officer, Port Department, Gibraltar.
- Un Se-kong, Clerk Class I, Prisons Department, Hong Kong.
- Willie Vaka, Senior Carpenter, Public Works Department, British Solomon Islands Protectorate.

=== Queen's Police Medal (QPM) ===
England and Wales

- Robert George Fenwick, Her Majesty's Inspector of Constabulary.
- John Lawlor, Commander, Metropolitan Police.
- John Cordeux Bliss, National Co-ordinator of Regional Crime Squads, Commander, Metropolitan Police.
- Clarence Harrington Cooksley, Chief Constable, Northumberland Constabulary.
- Thomas Charles Birkett Hodgson, OBE, Chief Constable, Thames Valley Constabulary.
- Richard Benjamin Thomas, Deputy Chief Constable, Dyfed Powys Constabulary.
- William Kelsall, Assistant Chief Constable, Cheshire Constabulary.
- John Douglas Dagg, Deputy Chief Constable, Cumbria Constabulary.
- Fred Calvert, Chief Superintendent, Norfolk Joint Police Force.
- Sidney Knapman Keast, Chief Superintendent, Devon and Cornwall Constabulary.
- Arthur Cunningham, Chief Superintendent, Metropolitan Police.
- John Renton, Chief Superintendent, Metropolitan Police.
- David Davies, Chief Superintendent, Metropolitan Police.
- Arthur Benfield, Chief Superintendent, Cheshire Constabulary.

Scotland

- James Cormack, BEM, Chief Constable, Orkney Constabulary.
- James Paterson, Superintendent, Scottish North-Eastern Counties Constabulary.

Northern Ireland

- Frederick McCurry, Head Constable, Royal Ulster Constabulary.

State of Victoria

- Leslie Frank Wright, Superintendent, Grade I, Victoria Police Force.
- Stanley Peter Armstrong, lately Superintendent, Grade I, Victoria Police Force.
- George William Hill, lately Superintendent, Grade I, Victoria Police Force.
- William Wall Warner Mooney, lately Chief Inspector, Victoria Police Force.

State of Queensland

- William Mackenzie McNaught, Inspector, Queensland Police Force.
- John O'Toole, Inspector, Queensland Police Force.
- John George Strophair, Inspector, Queensland Police Force.
- William Oliver James Powell, Inspector, Queensland Police Force.
- Thomas Boyle, Inspector, Queensland Police Force.
- Alfred Heinrich Pflugradt, Inspector, Queensland Police Force.

State of South Australia

- Arthur Robert Calvesbert, Inspector, 1st Class, South Australia Police Force.
- Laurence Desmond Draper, Inspector, 2nd Class, South Australia Police Force.

Overseas Territories

- Richard Arthur Joseph Richardson, Acting Chief Superintendent, Hong Kong Police Force.

=== Queen's Fire Services Medal (QFSM) ===
England and Wales

- Ernest James Gunnett, Divisional Officer, Grade I, Hertfordshire Fire Brigade.
- William Fredenck Haggerty, Divisional Officer, Grade I, London Fire Brigade.
- James Dunbevand, Chief Fire Officer, Salford Fire Brigade.
- John Rowlands, Chief Fire Officer, West Bromwich Fire Brigade.
- Alfred Ernest Reece, Chief Fire Officer, Burnley Fire Brigade.

=== Colonial Police Medal (CPM) ===
Brunei

- Awangku Omar bin Pengiran Apong, Assistant Superintendent, Royal Brunei Police Force.

Overseas Territories

- Ronald Herbert Bateson, Superintendent, Fiji Police Force.
- Frederick Colborn Bernard Bean, Detective Inspector, Bermuda Police Force.
- Chan Keung, Staff Sergeant Class II, Hong Kong Police Force.
- Eric Walter Jones, Assistant Superintendent, British Honduras Police Force.
- Kwan Tung, Principal Fireman, Hong Kong Fire Services.
- Eusebe Alexander Lawrence, Inspector, Royal Saint Lucia Police Force.
- Li Nam, Principal Fireman, Hong Kong Fire Services.
- Liu Wah-tong, Sergeant, Hong Kong Police Force.
- Alvin James Miller, Assistant Superintendent, Hong Kong Police Force.
- Peter Thomas Moor, Senior Superintendent, Hong Kong Police Force.
- James Joseph Edward Morrin, Senior Superintendent, Hong Kong Police Force.
- Ng Cheuk-fun, Senior Divisional Officer, Hong Kong Auxiliary Fire Service.
- Jone Nakutu Sawau, Inspector, Fiji Police Force.
- Tang Sai, Principal Fireman, Hong Kong Fire Services.
- Tang Wan, Staff Sergeant Class II, Hong Kong Police Force.
- David Tse Man-cheung, Senior Inspector, Hong Kong Auxiliary Police Force.
- Thomas Wainwright Wheeler, Chief Inspector, Hong Kong Police Force.
- Cyril Arthur Williams, lately Chief Police Officer, Colony Constabulary, Gilbert and Ellice Islands Colony.
- Yeung Kwok-wai, Staff Sergeant Class I, Hong Kong Police Force.

=== Royal Red Cross (RRC) ===
- Alice Mary Gadd, ARRC, Principal Matron, Queen Alexandra's Royal Naval Nursing Service.
- Lieutenant-Colonel Florence Mary Marsh (309119), Queen Alexandra's Royal Army Nursing Corps.
- Lieutenant-Colonel Marjorie Moreton (206346), Queen Alexandra's Royal Army Nursing Corps.

==== Associate of the Royal Red Cross (ARRC) ====
- Major Ellen Mary Coppack (208193), Queen Alexandra's Royal Army Nursing Corps.
- Major Hilda Dorothy Duncan (206989), Queen Alexandra's Royal Army Nursing Corps.
- Squadron Officer Dorothy Edna Lane (407324), Princess Mary's Royal Air Force Nursing Service.
- Squadron Officer Margaret Mary O'Connor (406765), Princess Mary's Royal Air Force Nursing Service.

=== Air Force Cross (AFC) ===
Royal Air Force

- Wing Commander Alastair McNaughton Christie (3114812).
- Wing Commander David John Edwards (583792).
- Wing Commander Jack Fennell, MBE (180109).
- Wing Commander Michael Horace Miller (607037).
- Wing Commander John William Tritton (2464883).
- Squadron Leader John Skelton Bennett (1575773).
- Squadron Leader Richard Walter Millward (607470).
- Squadron Leader Andrew Lyle Roberts (607817).
- Squadron Leader John Thirtle (504990).
- Squadron Leader Arthur William Vine, AFM (1323588).
- Flight Lieutenant Robert James Brydon, AFM (174340).
- Flight Lieutenant Alan Fisher (3511335).
- Flight Lieutenant William Walter Howell (56989).
- Flight Lieutenant John Alexander Matheson (55054), (Retired).

==== Bar to Air Force Cross ====
- Squadron Leader Frank Henry Watson Harrington, AFC (137446).
- Squadron Leader Alfred Claude Musgrove, AFC (185872).

=== Air Force Medal (AFM) ===
- U2676516 Flight Sergeant Frederick Roy Stewart Ayris, Royal Air Force.

=== Queen's Commendation for Valuable Service in the Air ===
Royal Air Force

- Wing Commander Stanley George Nunn, OBE, DFC (81935).
- Squadron Leader David Bromley (4106800).
- Squadron Leader Arthur Christopher Doggett (607301).
- Squadron Leader John Raymond Harper (607281).
- Squadron Leader Dennis George Hazell (4072330).
- Squadron Leader John James Maynard (2547928).
- Squadron Leader Kenneth Thomas Meehan (3510805).
- Squadron Leader Thomas Graham Roland Osborn (4148874).
- Squadron Leader Raymond Wynne Price (186496).
- Squadron Leader Lionel Thorner Reid (55077).
- Squadron Leader Derek Roy Webb (3511032).
- Squadron Leader Jack Whittle, DFC (121460), (Retired) for services with the Kenya Air Force.
- Acting Squadron Leader Christopher Rowe (505588).
- Flight Lieutenant David Reginald Bagshaw (507200).
- Flight Lieutenant Michael Frederick Bell (683942).
- Flight Lieutenant Brian George Bultitude (2238033), for services with the British Joint Services Training Team, Ghana.
- Flight Lieutenant John Douglas Christison (4092057).
- Flight Lieutenant Donald Peter Dewhurst (4039205).
- Flight Lieutenant George William Edward Foster, AFM (3051193).
- Flight Lieutenant Eric William Ginger (55557).
- Flight Lieutenant Derek Bryan Hopkins (4113874), (Retired).
- Flight Lieutenant John Donald Kendrick (608285).
- Flight Lieutenant Richard Ulric Langworthy (3516433).
- Flight Lieutenant John Rodney Lloyd (5200030).
- Flight Lieutenant Robert George Robinson (1609687).
- Flight Lieutenant Eric John Scales (2520191).
- Flight Lieutenant Gordon Kenneth Senior, DFC (55931), (Retired).
- Flight Lieutenant Bryan Arthur Thomas (4230450).
- Flight Lieutenant Reginald George Wilding, AFM (1181063), (Retired).
- Master Engineer William Durling Thomas (MO577111).
- Master Signaller Joseph Williams (Y1501667).

United Kingdom

- Susan Elisabeth Graham, Flight Cabin Services Officer (Stewardesses), British Overseas Airways Corporation.
- Leonard John Scott Houston, Chief Test Pilot, Ferranti Ltd., Edinburgh.
- Edward McNamara, DFC, Experimental Test Pilot, British Aircraft Corporation Ltd., Weybridge.
- Philip Murphy, Deputy Chief Test Pilot, Handley Page Ltd., St. Albans.
- Captain Edgar Oscar Noble, Senior Captain, 1st Class, British European Airways.
- Captain Peter Mains-Smith, DSO, DFC, Senior Captain, First Class, British Overseas Airways Corporation.

== Australia ==
=== Knight Bachelor ===
- Ernest Edward Dunlop, CMG, OBE, MS, FRCS. For distinguished services to medicine.
- Brigadier Frederick Gallagher Galleghan, DSO, OBE, ISO, ED. For distinguished services to ex-servicemen and women.
- Geoffrey Newman-Morris, ED, MS, FRCS. For distinguished services to the Australian Red Cross Society.
- Clarence Oscar Ferrero Rieger, CBE, MB, FRCS. For distinguished service to medicine.
- Ernest Keith White, CBE, MC, Federal President of the Australian/American Association.

=== Order of the Bath ===
==== Companion of the Order of the Bath (CB) ====
Military Division

- Major-General Robert William Knights, CBE (376), Australian Staff Corps.

=== Order of Saint Michael and Saint George ===
==== Knight Commander of the Order of St Michael and St George (KCMG) ====
- Sir Edward Emerton Warren, KBE, CMG, MSM. For distinguished services to international relations and the coal mining industry.

==== Companion of the Order of St Michael and St George (CMG) ====
- Norman Edward Thomas Jones. For services to the Iron and Steel Industry.
- Brigadier John Ernest Pagan, MBE, ED. For services to politics, industry and to the community.
- Thomas Logan Robertson, Chairman, Australian Council for Educational Research. For services to education.
- William Joshua Vines, Managing Director, International Wool Secretariat. For services to the Wool Industry.

=== Order of the Companions of Honour (CH) ===
- The Right Honourable John McEwen, Deputy Prime Minister and Minister for Trade and Industry.

=== Order of the British Empire ===
==== Dame Commander of the Order of the British Empire (DBE) ====
Civil Division

- Ella Annie Noble Macknight, MD, FRCOG. For distinguished services to medicine.

==== Knight Commander of the Order of the British Empire (KBE) ====
Civil Division

- Sir Frank Macfarlane Burnet, OM, MD, FRCAP, President, Australian Academy of Science. For distinguished services to medical research.
- His Eminence Cardinal Norman Thomas Gilroy, Roman Catholic Archbishop of Sydney.

==== Commander of the Order of the British Empire (CBE) ====
Military Division

Royal Australian Navy

- Rear Admiral William John Dovers, DSC.

Australian Military Forces

- Major-General Norman Alfred Vickery, MBE, MC, ED (352003), Citizen Military Forces.

Royal Australian Air Force

- Acting Air Commodore Marcus Lindsay MacInnis.
- Group Captain John Gladstone Cornish, MVO, AFC.

Civil Division

- Thelma Florence Bate. For services to the community.
- Victor George Burley. For services to education and industry.
- William Alexander Dargie, OBE, Artist and Member of the Commonwealth Art Advisory Board. For services to art.
- John Griffiths Davies, Chief, Division of Tropical Pastures, CSIRO.
- James Chester Guest. For services to commerce and industry.
- Matthew Harrison, OBE, of Kew, Victoria. For services to ex-servicemen and women and the community.
- Kenneth Norman Jones, First Assistant Secretary, Department of Education and Science, Canberra.
- Herbert Thomson Kienzle, MBE. For services to the development of Papua and New Guinea.
- Captain Robert James Ritchie, General Manager, Qantas.

==== Officer of the Order of the British Empire (OBE) ====
Military Division

Royal Australian Navy

- Acting Captain Robert Cecil Savage, DSC.
- Commander Ronald Frederick Reid, VRD, Royal Australian Naval Reserve.

Australian Military Forces

- Colonel Ewan Leonard Deane (340094), Royal Australian Dental Corps.
- Colonel John Knowles Lynch (412), Australian Staff Corps.
- Lieutenant-Colonel Gordon Lindsay Maitland, ED (275649), Royal Australian Infantry Corps.

Royal Australian Air Force

- Principal Air Chaplain Leslie Benjamin Smith.
- Group Captain Edgar Bruce Courtney, MVO.
- Wing Commander James Frederick Dawson (014198).

Civil Division

- Joyce Rosalind Alston, of Surrey Hills, New South Wales. For services to handicapped persons.
- Leonard William Barrow, of Cumberland, South Australia. For services to the community.
- Professor Wilfred David Borrie, Head, Department of Demography, Australian National University. For services to social science.
- John Jeffrey Bradley, of Temora, New South Wales. For services to journalism.
- Irene Crespin, Former Palaeontologist, Bureau of Mineral Resources, Department of National Development, Canberra.
- Clarence Waldemar Harders, Deputy Secretary, Attorney General's Department, Canberra.
- Brian William Hone, Headmaster, Melbourne Church of England Grammar School. For services to education.
- Lois May Hurse, of Blackburn, Victoria, For services to the community.
- Matthew Thomas Hyland, First Assistant Secretary (Finance and Material), Department of the Navy, Canberra.
- Moira Alice Kimpton, of Toorak, Victoria. Vice Chairman, Australian Red Cross Society.
- Geoffrey Raoul Lemprière, of Port Sorell, Tasmania. For services to politics, industry and the community.
- The Reverend Brother Vincent Raymond McKenna, Headmaster, St. Kevin's College, Toorak. For services to education.
- William Bernard Marston, of Nauru. Central Pacific. For services to the phosphate industry.
- Captain Stewart Carlyle Middlemiss, General Manager, Airlines of New South Wales, and Ansett Flying Boat Services. For services to civil aviation.
- The Reverend Canon George Gordon O'Keeffe, Former Bush Brother, and Headmaster, All Souls School, Charters Towers. For services to education and the community.
- Douglas Garfield Orchard, DFC, of Elizabeth East, South Australia. State Treasurer, Air Force Association. For services to ex-servicemen and women.
- Robert Davison Phillips, First Assistant Director-General (Policy), Department of Civil Aviation, Melbourne.
- Bronte Clucas Quayle, First Assistant Parliamentary Draftsman, Attorney-General's Department, Canberra.
- James William Roycroft, of Boorcan, Victoria. For services in Sporting and International Spheres.
- Councillor Walter Bevan Charles Rutt, of Hawthorndene, South Australia. For services to the blind and the community.
- Frank Elliot Samuel Trigg, MBE, of Warrawee, New South Wales. For services to education and commerce.
- Richard Thomas Unkles, of North Balwyn, Victoria. Chairman, No. 1 War Pensions Entitlement Appeal Tribunal.
- Walter William Watkins, Secretary for Law, Papua and New Guinea.
- Albert Edward Woodward, QC, of Balwyn, Victoria. For services to the Stevedoring industry.

==== Member of the Order of the British Empire (MBE) ====
Military Division

Royal Australian Navy

- Lieutenant Commander Brendan Gerard Hill.
- Engineer Lieutenant Commander John Arthur Duff.

Australian Military Forces

- 31392 Warrant Officer Class I Lance William Futcher, Royal Australian Engineers.
- Captain Norman Hugh Gow, ED (3103334), Royal Australian Electrical and Mechanical Engineers.
- 22172 Warrant Officer Class II Aubrey Raymond Maxfield, Royal Australian Infantry Corps.
- 2116107 Warrant Officer Class I Lindsay John Peck, Royal Australian Engineers.
- Major William Edward James Smith (17539), Australian Staff Corps (Special List).
- Major Norman James Springthorpe (237590), Royal Australian Army Ordnance Corps.
- 22691 Warrant Officer Class I (temporary) William Shaw Wickstead, Royal Australian Engineers.
- Major (temporary) Allan Ronald Windsor, ED (267154), Royal Australian Artillery.

Royal Australian Air Force

- Squadron Leader Ralph Daniel Barnes (033203).
- Squadron Leader John Edward Nicholson (021288).
- Warrant Officer Archie Francis Burt (A39033).
- Warrant Officer Jack Phillip Knight (A31977).

Civil Division

- Edmund Franklin Allchin, of Kensington Park, South Australia. For services to ex-servicemen and women.
- Neville Francis Amadio, Principal Flautist, Sydney Symphony Orchestra. For services to music.
- Brere Awol, President, Siau Local Government Council. For services in the development of Papua and New Guinea.
- John Henry Blackley, Former Clerk assisting the Judges of the Supreme Court of the Australian Capital Territory.
- William James Branscombe, Manager, Commonwealth Savings Bank, Sydney, New South Wales.
- George Arthur Robert Bryan, Senior Immigration Officer, Department of Immigration, Canberra.
- Milton Joseph Champion, President, Diabetics Association of New South Wales.
- The Reverend Brother John Rewi Crichton, Master, St. Patrick's College, Strathfield. For services to education.
- Douglas Roberts Dundas, of Woollahra, New South Wales. For services to art.
- Gwen Forsythe, of Roseville, New South Wales. For services to the community.
- Harold Hugh Garner, Principal, Adult Education Centre, Darwin.
- James Harry Gibbard, Editor, Townsville Daily Bulletin and North Queensland Register. For services to journalism.
- Harry Thomas Albert Goodman, of Thornleigh, New South Wales. For services as a member of Australian aid teams in South East Asia.
- Phillip Gordon Graham, Air Traffic Controller, Department of Civil Aviation, Port Moresby.
- Aubrey Richard Hall, of Glenbrook, New South Wales, Brigadier, Salvation Army. For services to the community and servicemen.
- Horace Pilfold Hancock, President, Handicapped Children's Association of Australian Capital Territory.
- Constance Verna Hauser, Personal Secretary to the Governor-General of the Commonwealth of Australia.
- Richard Watson Hewett, of Rous, New South Wales. For services to the dairy industry.
- Gary Leslie Hooper, of Fennelll Bay, New South Wales. For achievements at the Para Olympics, and services to disabled persons.
- Thomas Henry Hughes, Accountant, Department of Housing, Victoria.
- William Edward Inglis, MM, JP, Councillor Upper Blackwood Shire Council. For services to local Government.
- Albert Alexander Maxwell Kelly, Assistant Director-General, Medical and Hospital Branch, Department of Health, Canberra.
- Gregory Koshnitsky, of Malvern, South Australia. For services to Chess and to the community.
- Alderman Gladwys Madge Leach, of Linley Point, New South Wales. For services to the community.
- Jack Lee, Operations Superintendent, The Overseas Telecommunications Commission (Australia).
- Valda Leehy, of Reid, Canberra. For services to the Commonwealth Art Advisory Board and Literary Fund.
- George William Mackey, Regional Director, Bureau of Meteorology, Perth, Western Australia.
- Jessie Pretoria Massey, of Glen Iris, Victoria. For services to migrants and to the community.
- Edward Philip McGrath, Former Supervising Engineer, Postmaster-General's Department, Adelaide.
- Heather Pamela McKay, of Bronte, New South Wales. For services in sporting and international spheres.
- Herbert Garland Milner, of Lindfield, New South Wales. Former Commodore Chief Engineer of the Australian National Line Fleet.
- Reginald Alfred Nicholas, of Mount Pleasant, Western Australia. For services to ex-servicemen.
- Dorothy Margaret Nicholas, Former Matron, Repatriation General Hospital, Concord, New South Wales.
- Noel William Parry, of Nambour, Queensland. For services to migrants.
- John Wallace Robertson, Former Assistant Director, Telecommunications Division, Postmaster-General's Department, Queensland.
- Isaac Segal, MB, BS, Specialist, Repatriation Department, Melbourne Victoria.
- Joseph Sheen, JP, of Albion, Victoria. For services to migrants.
- Jean Wyllie Stafford, of Lindfield, New South Wales. For services to the community.
- Hilda Elsie Tuxworth, of Tennant Creek, Northern Territory. For services to the community.
- Wamp Wan, President, Mount Hagen Local Government Council. For services in the development of Papua and New Guinea.
- Ernest Gustav Adolf Weiss, Assistant Director-General (Mechanical) Head Office, Department of Works.
- Michael Vincent Wenden, of Liverpool, New South Wales. For services to swimming.
- William Gordon Young, Director of Physical Education, New South Wales.

=== Companion of the Imperial Service Order (ISO) ===
- Charles Stewart Barbour, MB, BS, Commonwealth Director of Health, Adelaide.
- Aldo Tito Ferrari, Director, Department of Works, Canberra.
- Alan George Salisbury, First Assistant Secretary, Programme and Budget Division, Department of Defence, Canberra.

=== British Empire Medal (BEM) ===
Military Division

Royal Australian Navy

- Chief Petty Officer Edward William Rose, R.35127.
- Chief Petty Officer Cook Ronald Alwyne Edwin Boulden, R.32382, Royal Australian Naval Volunteer Reserve.
- Chief Engine-Room Artificer Allan James Cameron, R.51804.
- Chief Engineering Mechanic John Kenneth Silver, R.31206.
- Chief Petty Officer Steward Allen Charles Guthrie, R.22029.

Australian Military Forces

- F65001 Sergeant Margaret Veronica Allen, Women's Royal Australian Army Corps.
- 541086 Sergeant Robert George Armitage, Royal Australian Infantry.
- 33436 Warrant Officer Class II (temporary) Joseph Harold Harlow, Royal Australian Electrical and Mechanical Engineers.
- 29761 Warrant Officer Class II (temporary) Francis Charles Johnston, Royal Australian Engineers.
- 28374 Sergeant Colin James Kendall, Royal Australian Army Dental Corps.
- 372824 Sergeant John Edward Ray, Royal Australian Infantry Corps.
- 517766 Sergeant William Frederick Thirley, Royal Australian Infantry Corps.
- 8931 Warrant Officer Class II (temporary) Mae Verave, Royal Australian Infantry Corps.

Royal Australian Air Force

- W25241 Flight Sergeant Elinor Breen, Women's Royal Australian Air Force.
- A32463 Flight Sergeant Alan Arthur Duckling.
- A32521 Flight Sergeant Ian Ehot Arthur Mullins.
- A53120 Sergeant Donald Laurence Cook.

Civil Division

- Lorna Delmar Bennett of Woollahra, New South Wales. For services to the community.
- Alice Mary Bowden, Supervisor, Postmaster-General's Department, Cairns, Queensland.
- Eric Thomas Cadwallader, of Concord West, New South Wales, For services to the Scouting Movement.
- Hedley Francis Caswell, Principal Technical Officer, Overseas Telecommunications Commission (Australia).
- Christina Mary Cochrane, Postmistress, Yarrowitch, New South Wales.
- Wilfred Cooper, Temporary Senior Technical Instructor, Naval Apprentice School, HMAS Nirimba.
- Elizabeth Margaret Titt Davidson, of Warradale, South Australia. For services to the community.
- Elsinore May Fox, of Burwood, New South Wales. For services to the community.
- Noel Samuel Naismith Goodair, Quarantine Inspector, Commonwealth Department of Health, New South Wales.
- Vera Evelyn Hadley, of Summer Hill, New South Wales. For services to ex-servicemen.
- Albert Arthur John Harris, Senior Porter, Australia House, London.
- Christina Mary Hayes, Accounting Machinist-in-Charge, Department of Works, Sydney.
- Alexander Heynatz, of Ballina, New South Wales. For services to the Fishing Industry.
- Percy Johnson, of Coal Point, New South Wales. For services to the community.
- Horace William Knowles, JP, Former Superintendent, Mercantile Marine Office, Department of Shipping & Transport, Tasmania.
- Adele May La Combe, of Yass, New South Wales. For services to the community.
- Jane Sinclair McCall, of Kogarah, New South Wales. For services to the community.
- Arthur Thomas Maxwell, Principal Attendant of the Senate, Canberra.
- George Munro, Former Senior Technical Officer, Victoria-Tasmania Region, Department of Civil Aviation.
- Carl Horwood Porter, of Newport, New South Wales. For services to blind ex-servicemen.
- Ernest James Pretty, Telegraphist, Postmaster-General's Department, South Australia.
- Roberta Maud Raven, Assistant Private Secretary to the Minister for Social Services, New South Wales.
- Catherine Ritchie, of Sydney, New South Wales. For services to the community.
- Pauline Rofe, Temporary Clerical Assistant, Department of the Navy, Sydney, New South Wales.
- Dorothy Grace Smith, of Muswellbrook, New South Wales. For services to the community.
- Charles Robert Theakstone, Former Postmaster, Postmaster-General's Department, South Australia.
- Richard James Valentine Thompson, Foreman Assistant, Lytton Quarantine Station, Brisbane.
- Richard Gregory Tivy, of North Ryde, New South Wales. For services to the community.
- William Pillo Tomutmut, Local Government Assistant, Papua and New Guinea Administration.
- Pearl Cassie Webb, of Carey Bay, New South Wales. For services to the community.
- Charles Newdegate Wedge, of Mount Pleasant, Western Australia. For services to ex-servicemen.
- Lionel George Whittaker, Workshops Supervisor, Department of Works, Alice Springs.
- Helen Catherine Williams, of Toowong, Queensland. For services to migrants.

=== Queen's Police Medal (QPM) ===
- Brian John Holloway, Superintendent, Royal Papua New Guinea Constabulary.
- Verdun Brian McNeil, Superintendent, Royal Papua New Guinea Constabulary.
- Bernard Alphonsus Rochford, Superintendent, Commonwealth of Australia Police Force.
- Nelson Tokiel, Inspector, 3rd Class, Royal Papua New Guinea Constabulary.

=== Air Force Cross (AFC) ===
Royal Australian Air Force

- Squadron Leader Arthur Barnes (036433).
- Squadron Leader Robert Max Hayes (051626).
- Squadron Leader Brian Frederick Stanley Nicolls, DFM (022103).
- Squadron Leader John Norris Parker, DFM (033838).

=== Royal Red Cross (RRC) ===
==== Associate of the Royal Red Cross (ARRC) ====
- Captain Amy Margot Pittendreigh (F1477), Royal Australian Army Nursing Corps.
- Squadron Officer Ailsa Betty Edwards (N13585), Royal Australian Air Force Nursing Service.

=== Queen's Commendation for Valuable Service in the Air ===
Royal Australian Air Force

- Wing Commander Kevin Roy Rodd (05872).
- Flight Lieutenant Brian Lawrence Morgan (0313132).
- A218947 Corporal Trevor John Pratt.

== Sierra Leone ==
=== Order of the British Empire ===
==== Commander of the Order of the British Empire (CBE) ====
Civil Division

- Samuel John Forster, Acting Puisne Judge, Supreme Court of Sierra Leone.
- The Honourable Paramount Chief Bai Koblo Pathbana II, MBE, Minister without Portfolio.

==== Officer of the Order of the British Empire (OBE) ====
Military Division

- Lieutenant-Colonel Frank West, MBE (356001), Royal Army Pay Corps.

Civil Division

- George Egerton Ekundayo Omojowo Davies, lately Assistant Chief Education Officer.
- The Venerable Archdeacon Michael Keili, MBE, Principal, Mission School, Bo, Southern Province.
- Alphaeus Thaddeus Thomas. For services to the advancement of education.

==== Member of the Order of the British Empire (MBE) ====
Military Division

- Major (acting) Sidney William Mawson (284076), Royal Corps of Signals.

Civil Division

- Gladys Lucretia Abioseh Brandon, JP, lately National Secretary, Sierra Leone Red Cross.
- Emanuel Davies, JP. For services to Trade and Commerce.
- Alimamy Sisay, Sub-Chief, Lunsar Town, Marampa Chiefdom, Northern Province.
- Christian Jellico Rollings Thomas, Trade and Industries Officer, Ministry of Trade and Industry.
- Joyce Emily Welch, Private Secretary to the Governor-General.
- Naulana Yansareh Bangura Williams, lately Agricultural Superintendent.

=== British Empire Medal (BEM) ===
Civil Division

- William Henry Barzey, Shed Master, Sierra Leone Railway.
- Sorie Bena, Headman of Kerry Town, York District.
- James Bockarie Jusu, Inspector, Sierra Leone Police Force.
- Moses Stanley Kargbo, Sub-Inspector, Sierra Leone Police Force.

=== Queen's Police Medal (QPM) ===
- Daniel Coomber, Chief Inspector, Sierra Leone Police Force.

== Gambia ==
=== Order of the British Empire ===
==== Member of the Order of the British Empire (MBE) ====
Civil Division

- Frank Reginald Roberts, Senior Superintendent, Electricity Services.

=== British Empire Medal (BEM) ===
Civil Division

- Esau Ishmael King, Superintendent, Composing Section, Government Printing Office.
- Fabakary Sanyang, Seyfu of Foni Brefet District.

== Guyana ==
=== Order of Saint Michael and Saint George ===
==== Knight Commander of the Order of St Michael and St George (KCMG) ====
- His Excellency Sir Lionel Alfred Luckhoo, CBE, QC, High Commissioner for Guyana and Barbados in the United Kingdom.

== Barbados ==
=== Knight Bachelor ===
- The Honourable William Randolph Douglas, Chief Justice of Barbados.
- Senator The Honourable Ernest Stanley Robinson, CBE, President of the Senate.
- His Honour John Eustace Theodore Brancker, QC, Speaker of the House of Assembly.

=== Order of Saint Michael and Saint George ===
==== Companion of the Order of St Michael and St George (CMG) ====
- Clyde Archibald Ramsay, MBE. Chief Establishments Officer and Head of the Civil Service.

=== Order of the British Empire ===
==== Commander of the Order of the British Empire (CBE) ====
Civil Division

- Senator Hubert Foster Alkins. For services to education and to the State.

==== Officer of the Order of the British Empire (OBE) ====
Civil Division

- Frank Milton Blackman, MBE, Permanent Secretary, Prime Minister's Office, and Secretary to the Cabinet.
- Alfred DeCourcy Boyce. For services to the community.
- Henry Augustus Charles Thomas. For services in the field of commerce and to the community.

==== Member of the Order of the British Empire (MBE) ====
Civil Division

- Elise Barrow, JP. For services to the community.
- William Harvey Clyde Gollop, Social Welfare Officer.
- Cleveland Caroline Rose. For services to the community, particularly to youth.

=== British Empire Medal (BEM) ===
Civil Division

- Timothy O'Bert Hoyte, Temporary Senior Agricultural Assistant, Ministry of Agriculture.

== Mauritius ==
=== Order of the British Empire ===
==== Officer of the Order of the British Empire (OBE) ====
Military Division

- Lieutenant-Colonel Alexander John Ward (360831), The Argyll and Sutherland Highlanders.

Civil Division

- Marcel Cabon. For services to literature.

=== Queen's Police Medal (QPM) ===
- Marie Evariste Jacques Ribet, Deputy Commissioner, Mauritius Police Force.
