= 2010 Birthday Honours =

British and commonwealth honours and awards

The 2010 Birthday Honours for the Commonwealth realms were announced to celebrate the Queen's Birthday on 7 June 2010 in New Zealand, on 12 June 2010 in the United Kingdom, The Bahamas, Grenada, Papua New Guinea, the Solomon Islands, Tuvalu, Saint Lucia, Saint Vincent and the Grenadines, and Antigua and Barbuda, and on 13 June 2010 in Australia.

The recipients of honours are displayed here as they were styled before their new honour, and arranged by honour, with classes (Knight, Knight Grand Cross, etc.) and then divisions (Military, Civil, etc.) as appropriate.

== United Kingdom ==
=== Knight Bachelor ===
- Professor John Rex Beddington, CMG, Government Chief Scientific Adviser, Government Office for Science.
- Councillor Merrick Cockell, Chairman, London Councils, and Leader, Royal Borough of Kensington and Chelsea. For services to Local Government.
- Stuart James Etherington, Chief Executive, National Council for Voluntary Organisations. For services to the Third Sector.
- Professor Marc Feldmann, Professor of Cellular Immunology, Kennedy Institute of Rheumatology, London. For services to Medicine.
- Professor Ian Thomas Gilmore, Consultant Physician and Gastroenterologist, Royal Liverpool University Hospitals, and President, Royal College of Physicians. For services to Medicine.
- (Theodore) Wilson Harris, Author. For services to Literature.
- Ronald Harwood, CBE, Playwright and Screen Writer. For services to Drama.
- Professor Colin John Humphreys, CBE, Director of Research, Department of Materials Science and Metallurgy, University of Cambridge. For services to Science.
- Donald William Insall, CBE. For services to Conservation Architecture.
- Professor Fergus Graham Burtholme Millar, Emeritus Camden Professor of Ancient History, University of Oxford. For services to Scholarship.
- Robert Sydney Murray, CBE. For services to Football and to Education in the North East.
- Denis Francis O'Connor, CBE, QPM, HM Chief Inspector of Constabulary. For services to the Police.
- Keith Pearson, Chairman, NHS East of England. For services to Healthcare.
- Simon Manwaring Robertson, Chairman, Rolls-Royce plc. For services to Business.
- Professor Peter Charles Rubin, Chairman, General Medical Council, London. For services to Medicine.
- Hugh Alexander Stevenson, lately Chairman, Equitas Ltd. For services to the Financial Services Industry.

=== Order of the Bath ===
==== Knight Grand Cross of the Order of the Bath (GCB) ====
Military Division

- Admiral Sir Mark Stanhope, KCB, OBE, ADC, C020394L.

==== Dame Commander of the Order of the Bath (DCB) ====
Civil Division

- Lesley Ann Strathie, Permanent Secretary, HM Revenue and Customs.

==== Knight Commander of the Order of the Bath (KCB) ====
Military Division

- Lieutenant General James Benjamin Dutton, CBE, Royal Marines, N022005F.

Civil Division

- Peter James Housden, Permanent Secretary, Department for Communities and Local Government.

==== Companion of the Order of the Bath (CB) ====
Military Division

Royal Navy

- Major General Garry Stuart Robison, Royal Marines, N025751Q.
- Vice Admiral Peter John Wilkinson, CVO, C023859Y.

Army

- Lieutenant General Richard Arthur David Applegate, OBE, late Royal Regiment of Artillery, 497361.
- Major General Andrew Richard Gregory, late Royal Regiment of Artillery, 514007.
- Major General David John Rutherford-Jones, late The Light Dragoons, 504501.

Royal Air Force

- Air Vice-Marshal Carl William Dixon, OBE.
- Air Vice-Marshal Richard Frank Garwood, CBE, DFC.

Civil Division

- John Alty, Chief Executive, Intellectual Property Office, Department for Business, Innovation and Skills.
- Sian Jarvis, Director-General, Communications, Department of Health.
- Bernadette Kelly, lately Director, Housing Strategy, Land and Markets Directorate, Department for Communities and Local Government.
- Lesley Longstone, Director-General, Young People, Department for Children, Schools and Families.
- Mark Neale, lately Managing Director, Budget, Tax and Welfare Directorate, HM Treasury.
- Susan Jane Owen, Director-General, Welfare and Wellbeing Group, Department for Work and Pensions.
- Peter Richard Charles Storr, International Director, Strategy and International Group, Home Office.

=== Order of Saint Michael and Saint George ===
==== Knight Commander of the Order of St Michael and St George (KCMG) ====
- Daniel Bethlehem, Legal Adviser, Foreign and Commonwealth Office.
- Tom Richard Vaughan Phillips, CMG, HM Ambassador to Israel.

==== Companion of the Order of St Michael and St George (CMG) ====
- Nicholas Graham Faraday Baird, CVO, lately HM Ambassador to Turkey.
- Michael Adrian Fulcher, Counsellor, Foreign and Commonwealth Office.
- Professor Michael Christopher Hardy, OBE, Programme Leader, Intercultural Dialogue, British Council.
- Major Geoffrey Douglas Langlands, MBE, Founder and Principal, The Langlands School and College, Chitral, Pakistan. For services to education in Pakistan.
- Victoria Margaret Treadell, lately Deputy High Commissioner to Mumbai, India.

=== Royal Victorian Order ===
==== Dame Commander of the Royal Victorian Order (DCVO) ====
- Susan Richenda, The Lady Elton, CVO, Lady in Waiting to The Queen.
- Diana Marion, Lady Farnham, CVO, Lady in Waiting to The Queen.
- The Lady Mary Christina Holborow, Lord Lieutenant of Cornwall.

==== Knight Commander of the Royal Victorian Order (KCVO) ====
- James Appleton Hawley, TD, Lord Lieutenant of Staffordshire.
- Roger Henry Vickers, Serjeant Surgeon, Royal Household.
- Samuel Charles Whitbread, Lord Lieutenant of Bedfordshire.

==== Commander of the Royal Victorian Order (CVO) ====
- Sir Christian John Storey Bonington, CBE, DL, Deputy Patron, Outward Bound Trust.
- Gilbert Kirkwood Cox, MBE, Lord Lieutenant of Lanarkshire.
- Commodore Peter John Melson, CBE, Royal Navy, formerly Director of Operations, Trinity House.
- Captain Nicholas Peter Wright, LVO, Royal Navy, Private Secretary to The Princess Royal.

==== Lieutenant of the Royal Victorian Order (LVO) ====
- Jane Wendy Graham, Assistant Keeper of the Privy Purse.
- Jean Catharine Gray, MVO, Senior Secretary, the Lady in Waiting's Office.
- Inderjit Kaur Jutlla, Assistant Treasurer to The Queen.
- Mark Murray Leishman, Private Secretary to the Prince of Wales and the Duchess of Cornwall.
- Major General the Honourable Seymour Hector Russell Hale Monro, CBE, formerly Adjutant, The Queen's Body Guard for Scotland, Royal Company of Archers.
- Lieutenant Colonel the Honourable Guy Norrie, formerly Lieutenant, Her Majesty's Body Guard of the Honourable Corps of Gentlemen at Arms.
- Major Thomas Wills, Lieutenant, The Queen's Body Guard of the Yeomen of the Guard.
- The Reverend Canon Anthony Robert Wright, Sub-Dean of Westminster Abbey and Rector of St. Margaret's Church.
- Edward Young, Deputy Private Secretary to The Queen.

==== Member of the Royal Victorian Order (MVO) ====
- Robert John Bell, Lord Lieutenant's Officer, Lincolnshire.
- Kevin Francis Coulthard, Deputy Fire Safety Manager, Windsor Castle.
- Barry John Gomm, Electrician, Windsor Castle.
- Jacqueline Rosemary Colliss Harvey, Publisher, Royal Collection.
- Anne Lycett, Head of Ambassadors, The Prince's Trust.
- David John Middleton, RVM, Chief Upholsterer, Royal Household.
- Sergeant William Edward Noon, Metropolitan Police. For services to Royalty Protection.
- Dr. Michael Turner, Inspector, Government Historic Estates Unit, English Heritage.
- Shaun Dominic Turner, Furniture Conservator, Royal Collection.
- Allan Dyment Williams, Clerk to the Merseyside Lieutenancy.

==== Medal of the Royal Victorian Order (RVM) ====
In Gold

- John Alan Brown, RVM, Tractor Driver, Sandringham Estate.

In Silver

- Andrea Baldwin, Daily Lady, St. James's Palace.
- Crawford Henry Butler, Yeoman Warder, HM Body Guard of the Yeomen of the Guard.
- Anna Fernandes, Housekeeper, Thatched House Lodge.
- Allen Michael Gilbert, formerly Team Supervisor, The Great Park, Crown Estate, Windsor.
- Matthew John King, Yeoman of Logistics, Royal Household.
- Kenneth Ronald Lea, Machinery Operator, Crown Estate, Windsor.
- Denise Patricia McAdam (Mrs. Georges). For Hairdressing services to the Royal Family.
- Stephen Matthew Murray, Yeoman of the Plate Pantry, Royal Household.
- Norman Anthony Newstead, Sawmill Worker, Sandringham Estate.
- Constable Raymond Michael Stanhope, Metropolitan Police. For services to Royalty Protection.
- Diane Isobel Wahlheim, Head Chef, Government House, Adelaide.
- Colin Peter Wood, Gardens Foreman, Sandringham House.

=== Order of the British Empire ===
==== Dame Commander of the Order of the British Empire (DBE) ====
Civil Division

- Professor Athene Margaret Donald, FRS, Deputy Head, Cavendish Laboratory, and Director, Women in Science, Engineering and Technology Initiative, University of Cambridge. For services to Physics.
- Amelia Chilcott Fawcett, CBE, Chair, Pensions First Group LLP and Guardian Media Group. For services to the Financial Services Industry.
- Jacqueline Fisher, CBE, Principal, Newcastle College. For services to local and national Further Education.
- Janet Marion Gaymer, CBE, QC (Hon.), Commissioner for Public Appointments. For public service.
- Professor Julia Mary Goodfellow, CBE, Vice-Chancellor, University of Kent. For services to Science.
- Professor Barbara Monroe, Chief Executive, St. Christopher's Hospice, London. For services to Palliative Care.
- Janet Paraskeva, First Civil Service Commissioner, and Chair, Child Maintenance Enforcement Commission. For public service.
- Paula Figueiroa Rego, Artist. For services to Art.
- Professor Alison Fettes Richard, DL, Vice-Chancellor, University of Cambridge. For services to Higher Education.
- Naila Zaffar, Headteacher, Copthorne Primary School, Bradford. For services to local and national Education.

==== Knight Commander of the Order of the British Empire (KBE) ====
Civil Division

- Maurice Flanagan, CBE, Executive Vice Chairman, Emirates Airline and Group, UAE. For services to the British aviation industry and British exports.
- Professor Charles Kuen Kao, CBE. For services to fibre optic communications.

==== Commander of the Order of the British Empire (CBE) ====
Military Division

Royal Navy

- Commodore Campbell Stuart Christie, C030984A.
- Captain Michael Edward Farrage, C032384D.
- Captain Richard Farrington, OBE, C027738H.
- Rear Admiral Ian Moncrieff, C025312M.

Army

- Colonel Crispian Edward Ian Beattie, late The Royal Green Jackets, 497567.
- Colonel Charles Beaupré Bell Clee, late The Blues and Royals (Royal Horse Guards and 1st Dragoons), 518400.
- Brigadier John Patrick Simon Donnelly, OBE, late The Cheshire Regiment, 514054.
- Colonel Richard Mark James Rollo-Walker, OBE, late The Light Infantry, 495378.

Royal Air Force

- Group Captain Colin Basnett (8183726A).
- Group Captain Kenneth Bruce McCann (5203279V).
- Group Captain Michael Christopher Neville (5205937M).

Civil Division

- Dr. Mary Armitage, Consultant Physician and Endocrinologist, Royal Bournemouth & Christchurch Hospitals NHS Foundation Trust. For services to Medicine.
- Simon Armitage, Poet. For services to Literature.
- Patricia Baskerville, Head of Safer Custody and Offender Policy, National Offender Management Service, Ministry of Defence.
- William Gordon Baxter, OBE, DL. For services to Business and to Charity in North East Scotland.
- George William John Benjamin, Composer and Conductor. For services to Music.
- Professor Timothy John Besley, Kuwait Professor of Economics and Political Science, London School of Economics. For services to Social Science.
- Peter George Betts, Director of International Climate Change, Department for Energy and Climate Change.
- Gavin McFarlane Black. For services to the community in the North East.
- William George Black, Chief Executive, Glasgow City Council. For services to Local Government.
- Jonathan Blackie, Regional Director, Government Office for the North East, Department for Communities and Local Government.
- John Brown, Director, Cross Cutting Group (Local Compliance) Glasgow, HM Revenue and Customs.
- Elizabeth Burnley, Chief Guide, Girlguiding UK. For services to Young People.
- Rodney Paul Carr, OBE, lately Chief Executive, Royal Yachting Association. For services to Sailing.
- Freda Chaloner, Director, Large Business Service, HM Revenue and Customs.
- Alan Clarke, Deputy Director, Curriculum and Pupil Well Being, Schools Directorate, Department for Children, Schools and Families.
- Peter Derrick Cleminson, lately National Chairman, Royal British Legion. For voluntary service to Ex-Servicemen and Women.
- Peter Collins, Chief Executive, Salford Foundation Charity. For services to Young People.
- Bryan Davis, Chief Executive, Social Security Agency Department for Social Development, Northern Ireland Executive.
- Linda Mary de Cossart, Consultant Vascular and General Surgeon, Countess of Chester Hospital. For services to Medicine.
- Dr. Stephen Deuchar, lately Director Tate Britain. For services to Art.
- Colin Dodge, Executive Vice-President of Africa, Middle East, India, Europe Operations, Nissan Motors Ltd. For services to the Automotive Industry.
- Judge Khurshid Hassan Drabu. For services to Community Relations.
- Dr. Marshall Paul Elliott. For public service.
- Dr. David Stuart English, MBE. For services to Cricket and to Charity.
- Brian Etheridge, Director, Civil Service Capability Group, Cabinet Office.
- Professor Andrew Finlay, lately Professor of Dermatology, Cardiff University. For services to Medicine.
- Stephen James Finnigan, QPM, Chief Constable, Lancashire Constabulary. For services to the Police.
- Siobhan Fitzpatrick, Chief Executive, Early Years Organisation. For services to Education in Northern Ireland.
- Peter John Freeman, QC (Hon.), Chairman, Competition Commission. For public service.
- Anne Galbraith, OBE, Chair, Valuation Tribunal Service. For public service.
- Professor David Michael Gann, Chair in Technology and Innovation Management, Imperial College London. For services to Engineering.
- Ann Margaret Green, Chair, Board of Trustees, Royal Armouries. For services to Museums.
- Judith Louise Greensmith. For services to the NHS in Merseyside.
- David Gregory, Headteacher, Fosse Way Community Special School, Bath. For services to local and national Special Needs Education.
- Dr. Russell Hamilton, Director of Research and Development, Department of Health.
- Nicholas Lionel Hardwick, Chairman, Independent Police Complaints Commission. For public service.
- Peter Robert Harrison. For charitable services through the Peter Harrison Foundation.
- Terence Hodgkinson, Chairman of Yorkshire Forward, Regional Development Agency. For services to Business and to Regeneration.
- Eileen Rosemary Holmes, President, Industrial Tribunals and the Fair Employment Tribunal in Northern Ireland. For services to Industrial Relations.
- Professor Ann Jacqueline Hunter, lately Senior Vice-President and Head, Science Environment Development, GlaxoSmithKline. For services to the Pharmaceutical Industry.
- Richard Hugh Hunting, lately Chairman, Geffrye Museum Trust. For services to the Arts and to Heritage.
- Christopher Rajendran Hyman, Chief Executive Officer, Serco. For services to Business and to Charity.
- Karl William Pamp Jenkins, OBE, Composer. For services to Music.
- Catherine Zeta Jones, Actor. For services to the Film Industry and to Charity.
- Barbara, Lady Judge, Chair, UK Atomic Energy Authority. For services to the Nuclear and Financial Services Industries.
- Raymond Andrew Kitson, Senior Assistant Director of Public Prosecution Service for Northern Ireland.
- Dr. Paul Langmaid, Chief Dental Officer for Wales, Department of Health and Social Services, Welsh Assembly Government.
- Robert Laslett, Director, Private Pensions and Chief Economist, Department for Work and Pensions.
- Professor David Seymour Latchman, Master of Birkbeck College, University of London. For services to Higher Education.
- Prudence Margaret Leith, OBE, lately Chair, School Food Trust. For services to the Catering Industry.
- Professor Noel Lloyd, Vice-Chancellor, Aberystwyth University. For services to Higher Education in Wales.
- Dr. Michael Longley, Poet. For services to Literature.
- Professor Linda Maitland Luxon, Professor of Audiological Medicine, University College London Hospitals NHS Foundation Trust. For services to Medicine.
- Professor David Whyte Macdonald, Professor of Wildlife Conservation, University of Oxford. For services to Natural Sciences.
- Dr. Karl Joseph MacKie, Chief Executive and Mediator, Centre for Effective Dispute Resolution. For services to Mediation.
- Professor Barry McCormick, Chief Economist and Chief Analyst, Department of Health.
- Robin John Christian Millar, Record Producer. For services to the Music Industry.
- Marlene Craigie Morley, OBE, Head of the Defence Equipment and Support Collocation Team, Ministry of Defence.
- Professor Alan Shaw Murie, Emeritus Professor of Urban and Regional Studies, University of Birmingham. For services to the Housing Sector.
- Peter Edward Murray, OBE, Founder and Executive Director, Yorkshire Sculpture Park. For services to the Arts.
- John Noble. For public service.
- George Carew O'Grady, Chief Executive, Professional Golfers' Association European Tour. For services to Sport.
- Douglas Edwin Oakervee, OBE, lately Chairman, Crossrail. For services to Civil Engineering.
- John Douglas Orr, Consultant Paediatric Surgeon and lately President, Royal College of Surgeons of Edinburgh. For services to Medicine.
- Jenny Owen, Executive Director, Adult, Health and Community Wellbeing, Essex County Council, and President, Association of Directors of Adult Social Services. For public service.
- Ruth Owen, Chief Operating Officer and Deputy Chief Executive Officer, Jobcentre Plus, Department for Work and Pensions.
- Hilda Elsie Marguerite Patten, OBE, Cookery Writer. For services to the Food Industry.
- Stephen Phipson, President and Group Managing Director, Smiths Detection Group Ltd. For services to the Security Industry.
- Graham Fenwick Pimlott, lately Chairman, Export Credits Guarantee Department. For services to Business.
- Hope Patricia Powell, OBE, National Coach, England Women's Football Team. For services to Sport.
- Professor Carol Propper, Professor of Economics of Public Policy, University of Bristol. For services to Social Science.
- Stephen Julian Przybylski, Head of Strategy and Policy, Crown Prosecution Service.
- William Roe, Chairman, Highlands and Islands Enterprise. For public service.
- Susan Carroll, Lady Sainsbury. For services to the Royal Shakespeare Company and to the Arts.
- John Robin Schultz, Chief Executive, Stockport Metropolitan Borough Council. For services to Local Government.
- Professor John Graham Shepherd, FRS, Professorial Research Fellow in Earth System Science, National Oceanography Centre, Southampton. For services to Science.
- Professor Martin Shirley, Director, Institute for Animal Health. For services to Science.
- Jo Shuter, Headteacher, Quintin Kynaston Community School, City of Westminster, London. For services to local and national Education.
- Professor David Thomas Sines, Pro Vice-Chancellor, Buckinghamshire New University. For services to Healthcare.
- Theodosia Sowa. For services to the Voluntary Sector in the UK and Overseas.
- Professor Robert Stephen John Sparks, FRS, Chaning Wills Professor of Geology, University of Bristol. For services to Environmental Science.
- Mary Cecilia Spinks, Director, Florence Nightingale Foundation. For services to Nursing.
- Alyson Jane Stafford, Director of Finance, Scottish Executive.
- Dr. Robert Scott Steedman, Vice-President, Royal Academy of Engineering. For services to Engineering.
- David Graham Stevens, Chief Operating Officer, Admiral Group. For services to the Insurance Industry and to Charity.
- Heather Vivienne Stevens. For charitable services.
- Paul Stockton, Director, Tribunals Judicial Office, Ministry of Justice.
- Norman Kelvin Stoller, OBE, DL. For charitable services.
- David Radcliffe Stone, OBE, Chairman, Sheffield Teaching Hospitals NHS Foundation Trust. For services to Healthcare.
- Dr. Timothy John Stone, Expert Chairman, Office of Nuclear Development. For services to the Energy Industry.
- Dr. (Ernest) Neil Suggett, Headteacher, Hayes Park Primary School, Hillingdon, London. For services to Education.
- Helen Patricia Tait, Headteacher, Sandgate Primary School and Folkestone Primary Academy. For services to Education in Kent.
- Stephen William Thomas, Chief Executive, Welsh Local Government Association. For services to Local Government.
- Harold Peter Tillman, Chairman, Jaeger and British Fashion Council. For services to the Fashion Industry.
- Martin Tolhurst, Principal, Newham College of Further Education. For services to Further Education in London.
- Louise Wendy Tulett, Group Director of Finance and Procurement, HM Treasury.
- Colin Jack, the Honourable Lord Tyre, lately President, Council of Bars and Law Societies of Europe. For services to the Administration of Justice.
- Professor Veronica van Heyningen, President, The Genetics Society. For services to Science.
- Dr. Jean Venables, OBE, President, Institution of Civil Engineers. For services to Civil Engineering.
- Robert Vincent, Chief Executive, Kirklees Council. For services to Local Government.
- Sarah Webb, Chief Executive, Chartered Institute of Housing. For services to the Housing Sector.
- Gillian Barbara Westerman, Principal and Chief Executive, Northern College for Residential Adult Education. For services to Adult Learning.
- John Furness Widdowson, Principal, New College Durham. For services to local and national Further and Higher Education.
- Dr. Robert James Young, Consultant Physician, Diabetes and Endocrinology, Salford Royal NHS Foundation Trust. For services to Medicine.

Diplomatic Service and Overseas List

- Thomas Edur, lately Senior Principal Dancer, English National Ballet. For services to the Arts and to UK/Estonian cultural relations.
- Henry Thomas Marsh, Senior Consultant Neurosurgeon, St George's Hospital, Tooting. For services to Medicine in the UK and Ukraine.
- Agnes Oaks, Senior Principal Dancer, English National Ballet. For services to the Arts and to UK/Estonian cultural relations.
- Dr. Lee James Taylor White, Head, Gabon's National Parks Agency. For services to Environmental Conservation and Sustainable Development in West and Central Africa.

==== Officer of the Order of the British Empire (OBE) ====
Military Division

Royal Navy

- Commander Matthew James Avison, C033542H.
- Commander Darren Cartwright, C032255Y.
- Lieutenant Colonel (now Colonel) Robert Graham Cundy, MBE, Royal Marines, N028071E.
- Commander Kevin Gomm, C026462M.
- Captain (Acting Commodore) Steven Charles Ramm, C021825S.
- Captain Ian Michael Robinson, RD, Royal Naval Reserve, C983662K.
- Commander Thomas Grenville Sharpe, C035842C.
- Commander Paul Kenneth Shawcross, C030263U.
- Commander Steven Luigi Smith, C026720Q.

Army

- Lieutenant Colonel Owen James Adams, Royal Regiment of Artillery, 521592.
- Colonel Darrell Peter Amison, late The Royal Logistic Corps, 536123.
- Colonel Alastair Andrew Bernard Ribey Bruce of Crionaich, late General List, Territorial Army, 509493.
- Colonel Peter Andrew Christian, Essex Army Cadet Force, 494473.
- Lieutenant Colonel Robert Lewis Gamble, Royal Tank Regiment, 539340.
- Lieutenant Colonel Andrew David Griffiths, Royal Army Medical Corps, 542939.
- Lieutenant Colonel Francis John Hollman, Corps of Royal Engineers, 543230.
- Lieutenant Colonel Anna Clare Luedicke, The Royal Logistic Corps, 538202.
- Lieutenant Colonel Michael John Purnell, Corps of Royal Electrical and Mechanical Engineers, 521687.
- Lieutenant Colonel Richard Arthur Robinson, The Royal Irish Regiment, 512677.
- Colonel Charles Patrick Carnegie Sloan, MBE, late the Royal Irish Regiment, 502912.
- Lieutenant Colonel Barry John Spiers, Royal Corps of Signals, 543680.
- Lieutenant Colonel John Robin Greenwell Stephenson, The Parachute Regiment, 526587.
- Colonel Gordon Straughan, TD, late The Royal Regiment of Fusiliers, Territorial Army, 531176.
- Colonel David Peter Turner, late Army Air Corps, 506903.
- Lieutenant Colonel Gary Paul Wilkinson, Royal Regiment of Artillery, 528966.

Royal Air Force

- Wing Commander Steven Jon Chadwick (8304300B).
- Wing Commander Andrew Kevin Jeffrey (8029314K).
- Group Captain Mark Harry Michael Kemsley, MBE, (5206907M).
- Wing Commander Richard Andrew Knight (8153035K).
- Wing Commander James Edward Linter (5205609Q).
- Wing Commander Ian David Sargeant (5205239Y).
- Wing Commander Dominic Joseph Toriati, MBE, (8029853B).

Civil Division

- Susan Marie Adams, Director, Care & Repair England. For services to the Housing Sector for Older People.
- Dr. Husna Ahmad, Chief Executive Officer, Faith Regeneration Foundation. For services to Disadvantaged People.
- Maqsood Ahmad, lately Head of Police Equality and Diversity Policy, Home Office.
- Mark Andrews, lately Chief Executive, NG Bailey. For services to Apprenticeships and Training in the Construction Industry.
- Mary Archer, Chief Officer, Essex Probation Area, Ministry of Justice.
- Clara Anthonyammah Arokiasamy, Chair, Greater London Authority Heritage and Diversity Task Force. For services to Heritage.
- Jane Arrowsmith, Principal, Troup House School, Aberdeen. For services to Special Needs Education.
- Professor Amanda Ashton, Director of Quality, NHS Leicester City. For services to Nursing.
- District Judge Gordon Rayment Ashton. For services to the Administration of Justice and to Disabled People.
- William Michael Allingham Ashton, MBE, Life President, National Youth Jazz Orchestra. For services to Music.
- Dalwardin Babu, Chief Superintendent, Metropolitan Police Service. For services to the Police.
- Linda Badman, Customer Services Director, Jobcentre Plus, Wales, Department for Work and Pensions.
- Vivien Bailey, lately Her Majesty's Inspector, Ofsted.
- Diana Barnes. For services to Mental Healthcare.
- Dr. Emma Barrett, Grade B1, Ministry of Defence.
- Elizabeth Barron, lately Chair, Firebuy Ltd. For services to the Fire and Rescue Service.
- Jackie Bennett, Head of Policy, Council of Mortgage Lenders. For services to the Financial Services Industry.
- Robert Edward John Bernays, DL. For services to the community in the South West.
- Sharon Berry, Chief Executive, Storybook Dads. For services to Children and Families.
- Anil Kumar Bhanot. For services to the Hindu community and to Inter-Faith Relations.
- Mark Blundell, Chief Executive, Salmon Youth Centre, Bermondsey, London. For services to Young People.
- Jennifer Susan Boothman, lately Headteacher, Pennington Church of England Primary School, Cumbria. For services to Education.
- Susan Bradbury, lately Editor-in-Chief, Folio Society. For services to the Publishing Industry.
- Professor Peter Brandon, lately Director of Strategic Programmes, University of Salford. For services to the Built Environment.
- Kathryn Broadhurst, Headteacher, Green Lane Infants School, Leicester. For services to Education.
- Adam Vere Balfour Broke. For public service.
- Neil Henry Bromley, lately Principal, North East Worcestershire College. For services to Further Education.
- David Brown. For services to the Voluntary Sector.
- John Cale. For services to Music and to the Arts.
- Padraig Canavan, Managing Director, Singularity Ltd. For services to Business in Northern Ireland.
- Thomas Canning, Headteacher, Tollgate Primary School, Newham, London. For services to local and national Education.
- John Adam Carr. For services to Children Protection on the Internet.
- James Rawson Carson. For services to Geography Education in Scotland.
- Barbara Rose Castle. For services to Regeneration in Wales.
- Janti Champaneri, lately Senior Manager, Adult and Communities Directorate, Birmingham City Council. For services to Local Government.
- Utheshtra Chetty, lately Senior Consultant Surgeon, Edinburgh Breast Unit. For services to Medicine.
- Aileen Chilton, Senior Manager A, Reducing Re-Offending Policy Group, National Offender Management Service, Ministry of Justice.
- Edward Chorlton, lately Deputy Chief Executive, Devon County Council. For services to Local Government.
- Peter Thomas Claiden, lately Principal Inspector of Air Accidents, Air Accidents Investigation Branch, Department for Transport.
- John Henry Cleary, Deputy Director, Housing and Growth Programmes Team, Department for Communities and Local Government.
- Brian Clemens, Screenwriter. For services to Broadcasting and to Drama.
- Alexander Jamieson Cluness. For services to the community in the Shetland Isles.
- Patricia Mary Coleman. For services to Local Government and to the community in the East Midlands.
- Alec Coles, lately Director, Tyne and Wear Archives and Museums. For services to Museums.
- Laura Coletti, Manager, Violet Melchett Sure Start Children's Centre, Kensington, London. For services to Children and Families.
- Professor Ian Colligan, lately Chairman, Board of Management, Dundee College. For services to Further Education.
- Paul Damian Conway, Senior Vice-President, Cargill Inc. For services to the Agricultural Industry.
- Wendy Cope, Poet. For services to Literature.
- James Romaine Hendry Coussey, Senior Prosecutor, Crown Prosecution Service.
- Professor Brian Edward Cox, Professor of Particle Physics and Royal Society University Research Fellow, University of Manchester. For services to Science.
- Christopher James Cox, Assistant Director Local Compliance, Individuals and Public Bodies, Cardiff, HM Revenue and Customs.
- Catherine Lynne Crawford, Chief Executive, Metropolitan Police Authority. For services to the Police.
- Jill Crawford, For services to Midwifery and Nursing.
- Fiona Cruickshank, Director, SCM Pharma Ltd. For services to Business in the North East.
- Barry Cunningham, Chief Publisher and Managing Director, Chicken House Books. For services to the Publishing Industry.
- Suzanne Cunningham, Consultant Midwife, Southampton University Hospital Trust and Bournemouth University. For services to Midwifery.
- Dr. Judith Mary Darmady. For services to Children's Well-Being Overseas.
- Angela Darnell, Headteacher, Egglescliffe School, Stockton-on-Tees. For services to Education.
- Professor Timothy Darvill. For services to Archaeology.
- Elizabeth Davidson. For services to Conservation and Architectural Heritage in Scotland.
- David Arthur Stephen Davies, lately President, National Farmers' Union, Cymru. For services to the Agricultural Industry in Wales.
- Beverley Jane Davies, Chief Executive, Manchester Science Parks. For services to Innovation.
- Susan Elizabeth Davies, Policy and Technical Specialist, Business Tax, London, HM Revenue and Customs.
- Colin Dawson, Chief Executive, British Association of Leisure Parks, Piers & Attractions Ltd. For services to the Tourist Industry.
- Jeanette Elizabeth Dawson, Principal, Bishop Burton College, Beverley. For services to Land-based Further and Higher Education.
- Stephen John Rodgers Dawson. For services to the Voluntary Sector.
- John Dew, Principal Construction Project Manager, Welsh Assembly Government.
- Miles Dibsdall, Principal, New College Stamford, Lincolnshire. For services to Further and Higher Education.
- Professor Anthony George Doré, Vice-President for Global Exploration, Statoil. For services to Geology.
- John Dunningham. For voluntary service to Tennis.
- William Robert Dunster. For services to Sustainable Housing Design.
- Barry George Albin-Dyer, Chairman, Kenyons Repatriation Services Ltd. For services to the Armed Forces.
- Joanna Elson, Chief Executive, Money Advice Trust. For services to People in Debt.
- Barry Raymond England, DL. For voluntary service to St. John Ambulance.
- Margaret Macdonald Eva, Headteacher, Bourne Community College, West Sussex. For services to Education.
- Stephen Nicholas Evans. For services to the Samaritans in the UK.
- Robin Anthony Eve. For services to the City of London Corporation.
- Michael Geoffrey Shaun Farrell. For services to the Church of England.
- Barry Forrester, lately Principal Recruitment Policy Adviser, Civil Service Commissioners, Cabinet Office.
- Steven Hamilton Freed, Grade B1, Ministry of Defence.
- Dr. Simon Gage, Director, Edinburgh International Science Festival. For services to Science Communication.
- Ronald Francis Gainsford, Chief Executive, Trading Standards Institute. For services to Consumers and to Business.
- Eileen Gallagher, Chief Executive, Shed Productions. For services to Broadcasting.
- Professor Harold Samuel Gamble, Professor of Engineering, Queen's University Belfast. For services to Science.
- Olivia Giles. For charitable services particularly to Disabled People.
- Margaret Gilmour, Grade B2, Ministry of Defence.
- John Ellis Glennie, lately Chief Executive, NHS Borders. For services to Healthcare.
- Trevor Graves, Oculoplastic Specialist Nurse, Leicester Royal Infirmary, University Hospitals of Leicester NHS Trust. For services to Healthcare.
- Harriet Green, Chief Executive Officer, Premier Farnell plc. For services to the Electronics Industry.
- Bonnie Greer, Playwright, Author and Critic. For services to the Arts.
- Dr. Ruth Mary Evelyn Griffin, Lead Scientist, Forensic Science Agency of Northern Ireland.
- Professor Dorothy Seymour Griffiths, Professor of HR Management and Deputy Principal, Imperial College Business School, London. For services to Higher Education.
- Peter Lloyd Griffiths, Group Chief Executive, Principality Building Society. For services to the Financial Services Industry.
- Catherine, The Lady Guthrie. For voluntary service to SSAFA Forces Help.
- John Gale Hambly, Deputy Technical Director, QinetiQ. For services to the Defence Industry.
- Garry John Handley, Team Leader, Road Safety Unit, Gloucestershire County Council. For services to Local Government.
- Nicola Jane Hanna, Director, Epilepsy Bereaved. For services to Families.
- Councillor Malcolm Charles Hanney. For services to the community in the South West.
- Jeremy Andrew Harris, Assistant Chief Constable, Police Service of Northern Ireland. For services to the Police.
- Martin Harris, Deputy Director, Assessments Staff, Cabinet Office.
- Gillian Anne Heaton, Executive Director of Patient Services and Chief Nurse, Central Manchester University Hospitals NHS Foundation Trust. For services to Healthcare.
- David George Henderson, Managing Director, Tobermore Concrete Products Ltd. For services to the Construction Industry in Northern Ireland.
- James Herbert, Author. For services to Literature.
- Dr. Robin Walter Hiley, Grade B1, Ministry of Defence.
- Robert Seamus Hill, Managing Director, Chemring Marine. For services to the Marine Industry.
- The Reverend Jean Margaret Hoggard. For services to the community in Halifax, West Yorkshire.
- Vivien Hopkins, Chief Operating Officer, Pension, Disability and Carers' Service, Department for Work and Pensions.
- Nigel Arthur Hoskin. For services to Dartmoor National Park.
- Professor Dominic Houlihan, Vice-Principal, University of Aberdeen. For services to Science Communication.
- Professor Kenneth Howard, Artist. For services to Art.
- Dr. Elizabeth Howells, Head of Primary Care Psychology and Health Psychology. For services to Mental Healthcare in Wiltshire.
- John Hudson, Senior Forestry Adviser, Department for International Development.
- Anthony John Hunter, Chief Executive, North East Lincolnshire Council. For services to Social Care.
- Stephen Hunter, QFSM, Chief Officer, Tayside Fire and Rescue. For services to Local Government.
- Mick Hurley, lately Serious Youth Violence Adviser. For services to Young People.
- Mashuq Hussain. For services to Young People and to Community Relations in Burnley and Pendle, Lancashire.
- Ian Crosbie Tennant Hutcheson, Director of Security, BAA Airports Ltd. For services to the Aviation Industry.
- Arthur Graeme Hyslop, Principal, Langside College, Glasgow. For services to Further Education.
- Taha Mohammad Idris, Chief Executive, Swansea Bay Race Equality Council. For services to Community Relations.
- John Jackson, JP, DL. For services to the community in Staffordshire.
- Tracy Jackson, Manager, Crescent Children's Centre, Stoke-on-Trent. For services to Children and Families.
- Lynne James, Manager, Hartcliffe Sure Start Children's Centre, Bristol. For services to Children and Families.
- Jonathan Andrew Jefferis, Grade B2, Ministry of Defence.
- Blair Jenkins. For services to Broadcasting.
- George Robert Jenkins, Vice-Chairman, NHS Blood and Transplant, and Chairman, South London Healthcare NHS. For services to Healthcare.
- Dr. Ian Dennis Jenkins, Senior Curator, Greek Collections, British Museum. For services to Museums.
- Professor Arthur Thomas Peter Jones, Senior Pro-Vice-Chancellor, Academic Development and Research, Nottingham Trent University. For services to Higher Education and to the Legal Profession.
- Dilys Cynthia Mary Jones, lately Headteacher, Lypiatt Primary School and Early Years Centre, Wiltshire. For services to Education.
- Dan Clayton-Jones. For services to the Voluntary Sector in Wales.
- Jean Mary Jones, Headteacher, Grace Owen Nursery School, Sheffield. For services to Early Years Education.
- Mair Jones. For services to Further Education in Wales.
- Sian Rees-Jones, Headteacher, Bognor Regis Nursery School and Children's Centre, West Sussex. For services to Early Years Education.
- Ursula Jones. For services to Music.
- Dr. Sukhbir Singh Kapoor, Vice-Chancellor, World Sikh University. For services to Community Relations.
- Paul Warren Kendrew, Senior Official, HM Revenue and Customs.
- Nick Knight, Fashion Photographer. For services to Art.
- Dr. Kartar Singh Lalvani. For services to the Pharmaceutical Industry and to Charity.
- Deepak Lalwani, Director, India, Astaire & Partners. For services to the Financial Services Industry.
- Robin Frank Landman, Chief Executive Officer, Network for Black Professionals. For services to Black and Minority Ethnic Further Education.
- Jurat Derek Le Page, lately Jurat of the Royal Court. For services to the Administration of Justice in Guernsey.
- Roger Adrian Legate, Principal and Head of Visual Impairment Service, Linden Lodge School, Wandsworth, London. For services to Special Needs Education.
- Sharon Patricia Lemon. For public service.
- Eric James Lewis, lately Chief Executive Officer, Doncaster's Group. For services to Industry.
- Marion Lewis, Chair, Neighbourhood and Homewatch Network, England and Wales. For services to Community Safety.
- Sian Lockwood, Chief Executive, Community Catalysts (NAAPS UK). For services to Social Care.
- Karen Logan, Nurse Consultant (Continence Services), Aneurin Bevan Health Board. For services to Healthcare.
- Joanna Elisabeth Anne Tait-Lovatt, lately Principal and Chief Executive, Bishop Auckland College. For services to local and national Education.
- Dr. Kailash Chand Malhotra, General Medical Practitioner, Ashton-under-Lyne. For services to Healthcare.
- Jehangir Malik. For services to Islamic Relief.
- Christine Mann, JP. For services to the Prevention of Domestic Abuse.
- Stephen Mathews, Chief Executive, Cedar Foundation. For services to Disabled People in Northern Ireland.
- Janet Erica Matthewman, Head of Culture, Media and Sport, Government Office for the North West.
- Angela Jane Maxwell, Managing Director, Acuwomen. For services to Business in the West Midlands.
- Anthony Peter McCoy, MBE, Jockey. For services to Horse Racing.
- Patrick Joseph McIntyre, Chief Executive, Northern Ireland Housing Executive. For services to the Housing Sector.
- Joseph McVey, Chairman, Volunteer Development Agency. For services to the Voluntary Sector in Northern Ireland.
- Gaynor Mears. For services to Preventing Domestic and Sexual Violence.
- Tamara Mellon, Founder and Chief Creative Officer, Jimmy Choo Ltd. For services to the Fashion Industry.
- Judith Ann Million, Deputy Regional Director, Government Office for the North East.
- Jayne Mary Monkhouse. For services to Equal Opportunities and to Diversity.
- Leslie Ann Morphy, Chief Executive, Crisis. For services to Homeless People.
- Dr. Jennifer Morris. For services to Disabled People.
- Robert Mullen, Governor, HM Prison Lindholme, HM Prison Service.
- Barry Mussenden, Deputy Director, Policy and Strategy Directorate, Department of Health.
- Catherine Myers, Executive Headteacher, Bishop Challoner Catholic Collegiate Schools, Tower Hamlets, London. For services to Education.
- Mohammad Nazir, Chairman, West Midlands Ethnic Minority Business Forum. For services to Business.
- John Vivian Drummond Nettles, Actor. For services to Drama.
- John Irwin Nevin, lately Assistant Director of Operations (Benefits Assurance), Social Security Agency, Northern Ireland Executive.
- Rosalind Newlands, Course Director for Tourist Guide Training, University of Edinburgh. For services to the Tourist Industry.
- Angela Elizabeth O'Connor, Headteacher, Sacred Heart Catholic Primary School, Hastings. For services to Education.
- Alache Ode. For services to Diaspora Communities in the UK and Overseas.
- Dr Nelson Olawale Ogunshakin, Chief Executive, Association for Consultancy and Engineering. For services to the Construction and Engineering Industries.
- Sophie Okonedo, Actor. For services to Drama.
- Margaret Oldfield, Chair, Rotherham NHS Foundation Trust. For services to the community in South Yorkshire.
- Kenneth Olisa, Chairman, Thames Reach. For services to Homeless People in London.
- Dr. Keith Palmer. For services to Economic Development Overseas.
- Dr. Cornelia Ann Parker, Sculptor and Installation Artist. For services to Art.
- Bryn Parry, Co-Founder, Help for Heroes. For voluntary service to the Armed Forces.
- Emma Parry, Co-Founder, Help for Heroes. For voluntary service to the Armed Forces.
- Dr. Rachel Elizabeth Perkins, Director of Quality Assurance and User Experience, South West London and St George's Mental Health NHS Trust. For services to Mental Health.
- Zahara Hyde Peters, Chief Executive Officer, British Triathlon Federation. For services to Athletics.
- Julian Pettifer. For services to Journalism and to Wildlife Conservation.
- Professor David Andrew Phoenix, Deputy Vice-Chancellor, University of Central Lancashire. For services to Science and to Higher Education.
- John Hugh Pitman, Executive Chairman, JHP Group Ltd. For services to Vocational Training.
- Nicholas Clive Randle, Chief Executive, Society of Local Council Clerks. For services to Local Government.
- André Rebello, HM Coroner for Liverpool. For services to the Administration of Justice.
- Ann Helen Reed. For services to the Gender Identity Research and Education Society.
- Bernard Reed. For services to the Gender Identity Research and Education Society.
- Geoffrey Reed, Senior Statistician, Department for Business, Innovation and Skills.
- Bennett Lyle Edward Reid. For services to Business and to the community in Walsall, West Midlands.
- Professor Ken Reid, lately Deputy Vice-Chancellor, Swansea Metropolitan University. For services to Education.
- Honor Rhodes, Director of Strategic Development, Tavistock Centre for Couple Relationships. For services to Children and Families.
- Andrew George Ripley. For services to Sport, particularly Rugby. (To be dated 20 May 2010.)
- Jacqueline Roberts, Chief Executive, Care Commission. For services to Social Care in Scotland.
- Jacqueline Ann Robinson, President, England Squash. For services to Sport.
- Michael Jeremy Rye, Leader, Enfield Council. For services to Local Government.
- Inderjit Kaur Sandhu, Headteacher, Launde Primary School, Leicestershire. For services to Education.
- Johanna Senior. For services to the Administration of Justice.
- Dr. Prem Dutt Sharma. For services to Community Relations.
- Stephen Frank Shine, Chief Operating Officer, Thames Water. For services to the Water Industry.
- Angela Sibson, Chief Executive, National Academy for Parenting Practitioners. For services to Children and Families.
- Beverley Francis Smart. For services to People with Special Needs.
- Dr. Deborah Anita Smith, Director, Building Research Establishment. For services to Fire Safety.
- Professor Deborah Frances Smith, Professor of Molecular Parasitology, University of York, and Chair, Medical Research Council Infections and Immunity Board. For services to Science.
- Nigel Saxby-Soffe, lately Finance Director, Action Aid International. For services to International Development.
- Thelma Olive Sorensen. For services to the Economic Regeneration of Cornwall.
- Linbert Soloman Spencer. For services to the Voluntary Sector.
- Ruth Stanier, Deputy Director, Preventing Repossessions and Homelessness, Department for Communities and Local Government.
- Christopher Stevens, lately Head of Inclusion Policy, British Educational and Communications Technology Agency. For services to Special Needs Education.
- Brian West Stewart, lately Chief Executive, East of England Regional Assembly. For services to Local Government.
- Dr. Richard Malcolm Ellis Stone. For public and voluntary service.
- David George Stout, Executive Director of Finance and Communications, NHS North East Strategic Health Authority. For services to the NHS.
- Professor Rodney Paul Sturges. For services to Libraries in the UK and Overseas.
- Shane Edwin Sutton, Track Performance Manager, Cycling GB. For services to Sport.
- Elizabeth Taylor, Public Health Manager, Southampton City Primary Care Trust. For services to Children and Families.
- Kenneth John Taylor, Leader, Coventry City Council. For services to Local Government.
- Mary Teasdale, Head, National Information and Advice Service for Families of People with Schizophrenia. For services to Mental Healthcare.
- Barbara Lynne Thomas. For charitable services.
- Pauline Thompson. For services to Older and Disabled People.
- Tina Tietjen, Chairman, Air Transport Users' Council. For services to the Aviation Industry.
- Martin John Tiplady, Director, Human Resources, Metropolitan Police Service. For services to the Police.
- Professor Brian Toft, Professor of Patient Safety, Faculty of Health and Life Sciences, Coventry University. For services to Healthcare.
- Keith Tondeur, President, Credit Action. For services to Financial Education.
- Judith Anne Tunstall, Senior Private Secretary, Department for Work and Pensions.
- Margaret Turner, Chief Executive, Diana Award. For services to Young People.
- Baljit Ubhey, Chief Crown Prosecutor, Thames Valley and Group Chair, Thames and Chiltern, Crown Prosecution Service.
- Carol Kathleen Walton, MBE. For services to Disability Sport.
- Elizabeth Rayner Scott Walton, Lately Principal, William Morris Sixth Form, Hammersmith and Fulham, London. For services to Post-16 Education.
- Pauline Waterhouse, Principal and Chief Executive Officer, Blackpool and The Fylde College, Lancashire. For services to Further Education.
- Sylvia Beatrice Wear, Chief Executive, RCV Charity. For services to Disabled People.
- Alison Joan Wenham, Chairman and Chief Executive, Association of Independent Music. For services to the Creative Industries.
- Fiona Marie Wheeler, Team Leader, Early Years Parenting and Promoting Learning Team, Department for Children, Schools and Families.
- John Whittaker, Deputy Director, Customer Operations PAYE and Self Assessment Strategic North, Nottingham, HM Revenue and Customs.
- John Mills Whyte, lately Director Central Region, UK Border Agency, Home Office.
- Ann Wild. For services to Wheelchair Basketball.
- Desmond Williamson, Principal, Castlederg High School. For services to Education in Northern Ireland.
- John Bryan Wybrew, lately Chairman, Energy and Utility Skills. For services to Training.
- Nicola Yates, Chief Executive, Hull City Council. For services to Local Government.

Diplomatic Service and Overseas List

- Philip King Alcock, Prosecutor, War Crimes Department, Prosecutor's Office, Bosnia and Herzegovina. For services to the protection of human rights and the rule of law in Bosnia and Herzegovina.
- Mockbul Ali, Islamic Issues Adviser, Foreign and Commonwealth Office.
- Rodney Keith Bain, lately Chairman, British Chamber of Commerce Thailand. For services to UK/Thailand commercial interests.
- Nigel Marcus Baker, MVO, HM Ambassador to Bolivia.
- Dr. Maha Taysir Barakat, Co-Founder, Imperial College Diabetes Centre, Abu Dhabi. For services to medical research, training and public health in the United Arab Emirates.
- Gideon David Beale, First Secretary, Foreign and Commonwealth Office.
- Michael Edward Billett, MBE, Director of the North American Office, Mountbatten Institute. For services to Education, particularly Student Exchange and International Study between the UK and USA.
- Dr. Vernon Edward Hartley Booth, Chairman, Uzbek-British Trade and Investment Council and Chairman of the British-Uzbek Society. For services to UK-Uzbek commercial interests.
- Professor Stephen Chan, Professor of International Relations, School of Oriental and African Studies. For services to Africa and Higher Education.
- Richard John Cheney, Chairman, Commonwealth Society and Director, Chile British Chamber of Commerce. For services to the community in Chile and UK/Chile commercial interests.
- Professor James Chadwick Dunkerley, Professor of Latin American Politics and Modern History, Institute for the Study of the Americas (ISA). For services to Latin American studies and UK/Latin American relations.
- Alexander Ian Arthur Evans, lately First Secretary Political, British High Commission, Pakistan.
- Rupert John Addison Gaskin, Counsellor, Foreign and Commonwealth Office.
- Jeremy Stuart Jacobson, Director, British Council, Algeria.
- Malcolm Alun Richard Llewellyn, Chair, British Chamber of Commerce Indonesia. For services to UK/Indonesian commercial interests and to the community in Indonesia.
- Barry Peter Marsh, lately President, British Chamber of Commerce and Founder Member, the Moroccan British Business Council. For services to UK/Moroccan business interests.
- Stuart McCarthy, First Secretary, Foreign and Commonwealth Office.
- Nicholas McGegan, Conductor and Musicologist. For services to Music overseas.
- Kevin McGurgan, lately Deputy Head, Provincial Reconstruction Team, Lashkar Gah.
- Dr. Jane Elizabeth Miller, Director, Maternal and Child Health Programmes and Initiatives, Population Services International. For services to controlling and helping to eliminate Malaria in Tanzania.
- Conchita Consuelo Ming, For services to the community and the Arts, Bermuda.
- Graham William Nash, Co-Founder of Crosby, Stills and Nash. For services to Music and for charitable activities.
- Terence Donald O'Connor, President, British Chamber of Commerce, Singapore and CEO, Courts (Singapore) Ltd. For services to UK/Singapore commercial interests.
- Dr. John Ben Oswald Palmer, First Secretary, Foreign and Commonwealth Office.
- David Sim Paterson, MBE, lately Director, Royal Botanic Garden Edinburgh. For services to Sino-British co-operation on biodiversity.
- Dr. Adam Keith Prewett, First Secretary, Foreign and Commonwealth Office.
- Nicholas John Pyle, MBE, lately Chief Political Adviser, UN Political Office for Somalia.
- Ian Ralfini, lately General Manager and Vice President, EMI Manhattan Records, USA. For services to the Music Industry and charitable activities in the UK and USA.
- Colin Reeves, Consultant Technical Adviser, Foreign and Commonwealth Office.
- Keith Thomas Richards, Managing Director, Promasidor Nigeria Ltd. For services to UK/Nigerian business interests and charitable activities in Nigeria.
- Alan Paul Smart, Director, British Council, Burma.
- Peter Alan Stephenson, Director Trade and Investment, British High Commission, Nigeria.
- The Honourable Darwin Kurt Tibbetts, JP, Leader of the Opposition, Cayman Islands. For services to the community.

==== Member of the Order of the British Empire (MBE) ====
Military Division

Royal Navy

- Lieutenant Jeffrey Richard Bevan, C038321S.
- Warrant Officer Class 1 Warfare Specialist (Abovewater Warfare Tactical) Andrew Neil Collings, D170235C.
- Major Nicholas Alan Griffiths, Royal Marines, N029148E.
- Chaplain John Hill, C037507X.
- Warrant Officer Class 2 Engineering Technician (Marine Engineering Submarines) Kevin Alan Keenan, D199951T.
- Lieutenant Commander Brian Stuart Leyshon, C020520L.
- Major Christopher Sydney Middleton, Royal Marines, N029221Y.
- Warrant Officer Class 1 (Master at Arms) Susan Morgan, W133839N.
- Warrant Officer Class 2 Gavin O'Connell, Royal Marines, P047878J.
- Corporal (Acting Sergeant) Stephen Kenton Perry, Royal Marines, P046386G.
- Lieutenant Commander Richard Michael John Sutton, C035070Y.
- Leading Logistician (Catering Services) Rachael Talton, W143392G.
- Lieutenant Commander Dain Jason Thorne, C037370T.
- Warrant Officer Class 1 (Communication Information Systems Specialist) Timothy Mark Trevarthen, D180919H.

Army

- Staff Sergeant Kenneth Barnett, Adjutant General's Corps (Staff and Personnel Support Branch), Territorial Army, 24440483.
- Major Jonathan David Billings, Royal Tank Regiment, 533318.
- Warrant Officer Class 2 Robert David Birkenhead, The Parachute Regiment, 24697934.
- Major Douglas Arthur Black, Corps of Royal Engineers, 549743.
- Major Phillip Nowell Blanchfield, The Royal Anglian Regiment, 560053.
- Lieutenant Colonel Ranald Alasdair Blue, The Rifles, 498953.
- Warrant Officer Class 1 Mark Philip Bragg, The Royal Logistic Corps, 25022417.
- The Reverend Colin Sydney Butler, Chaplain to the Forces 3rd Class, Royal Army Chaplains' Department, 541891.
- Staff Sergeant Paul John Butler, Intelligence Corps, 24844236.
- Staff Sergeant Annabel Jo Byles, Army Physical Training Corps, W0813206.
- Major Shaun Anthony Casey, The Mercian Regiment, 539546.
- Lieutenant Colonel Stephen Allen Clarke, GM, QGM, Royal Corps of Signals 543446.
- Lieutenant Colonel Andrew Charles Clee, Corps of Royal Engineers, 533547.
- Lieutenant Colonel Charles Seymour Collins, The Rifles, 542143.
- Captain Benjamin Beaupré Creed, Corps of Royal Electrical and Mechanical Engineers, 556344.
- Major Clare Marie Dutton, Queen Alexandra's Royal Army Nursing Corps, 548420.
- Major Kevin David Fitchett, Royal Regiment of Artillery, 559899.
- Lieutenant Colonel Colin John Francis, The Royal Logistic Corps, 540034.
- Major Christopher Ham, Royal Army Veterinary Corps, 547684.
- Major Donald Andrew Hodgson, Corps of Royal Electrical and Mechanical Engineers, 548668.
- Corporal Lee Martin Innes, Corps of Royal Engineers, 24792698.
- Major Michael David Jeavons, Corps of Royal Electrical and Mechanical Engineers, 537441.
- Warrant Officer Class 2 Robert King, Royal Regiment of Artillery, Territorial Army, 24587695.
- Warrant Officer Class 1 Duncan Sinclair Lamb, Royal Regiment of Artillery, 24327836.
- Warrant Officer Class 2 Stephen Michael Magloire, The Royal Logistic Corps, 24592523.
- Lieutenant Colonel Toni Jane Heather Martin, The Royal Logistic Corps, 543314.
- Captain Robert Bruce Mather, Corps of Royal Engineers, 563784.
- Major Michael McCarthy, The Royal Regiment of Fusiliers, 553235.
- Warrant Officer Class 2 Lesa McInnes, Adjutant General's Corps (Staff and Personnel Support Branch), W0815828.
- Major Bruce McKay, Adjutant General's Corps (Staff and Personnel Support Branch), 535793.
- Major Geoffrey Edward Minton, The Princess of Wales's Royal Regiment, 536695.
- Major Gordon Muirhead, The Parachute Regiment, 559793.
- Major Nicole Marie Nicholls (née Record), Intelligence Corps, 544249.
- Captain Simon Oats, Corps of Royal Engineers, 563729.
- Major Abigail Ross Pack, Royal Regiment of Artillery, 554379.
- Major Philip Michael Packer, Adjutant General's Corps (Royal Military Police), 547982.
- Lieutenant Colonel Francis Alexander James Piggott, The Royal Dragoon Guards, 536705.
- Major Julian Michael Pott, The Parachute Regiment, 559794.
- Major Mark Pullan, Royal Regiment of Artillery, 546021.
- Major Andrew Robert Redding, The Parachute Regiment, 544976.
- Colour Sergeant Graham Clive Richards, The Royal Anglian Regiment, 24891983.
- Major Simon Andrew Ridgway, Royal Tank Regiment, 550797.
- Captain Keith Richard Roberts, The Princess of Wales's Royal Regiment, Territorial Army, 566166.
- Major Leon James Roberts, Royal Army Medical Corps, 548616.
- Major Barry James Skinner, Royal Corps of Signals, Territorial Army, 552191.
- Captain Colin Alfred William Smith, The Parachute Regiment, Territorial Army, 539750.
- Lieutenant Colonel Michael Vince, Buckinghamshire Army Cadet Force, 479913.
- Major Raymond Walter Wells, Adjutant General's Corps (Staff and Personnel Support Branch), Territorial Army, 536151.
- Captain Huw Gruffydd Williams, The Royal Logistic Corps, 24648991.
- Major Christopher John Willis, The Rifles, Territorial Army, 546976.
- Captain Robert James Wilmont, Royal Regiment of Artillery, Territorial Army, 565165.
- Major Mark Christian Peter Wilson, The Rifles, 546065.
- Major Alan Young, Corps of Royal Electrical and Mechanical Engineers, 547234.

Royal Air Force

- Warrant Officer Stephen Roy Bell (J8171383).
- Warrant Officer Adrian Charles Betts (H8177182).
- Sergeant Alan David Bowman (T8225049).
- Squadron Leader Alan John Dawson (2640321G).
- Flight Sergeant William Draper (F8261022).
- Chief Technician Andrew Michael Fry (H8204864).
- Flight Lieutenant Andrew David Glover (8029281D).
- Squadron Leader Ross Goldsworthy (0209959T), Royal Air Force Volunteer Reserve (Training).
- Warrant Officer Grahame Douglas Grimshaw (Q8290606).
- Sergeant Steven Leslie Heywood (A8285804).
- Squadron Leader David Alan Hood (8246023K).
- Warrant Officer Leslie George Hotson (D8112001).
- Squadron Leader James Patrick Lennie (8136789T).
- Warrant Officer Lyndsay Hugh Morgan (K8102295).
- First Officer Richard Lavender, Royal Fleet Auxiliary (700187D)

Civil Division

- Andrew Abberley. For public service.
- Reginald Adams, lately Coach, Grangemouth Amateur Swimming Club. For services to Sport.
- Saima Afzal. For services to the Police and to Community Relations in Lancashire.
- Daljit Singh Ahluwalia. For voluntary service to Community and Inter-faith Relations in Derbyshire.
- Zaheer Ahmad, Constable, British Transport Police. For services to the Police.
- Basheer Ahmed, Honorary Life Vice-President, Race Equality Council of Lincolnshire. For services to Community Relations.
- Shanaz Ahmed. For services to the Asian community in the East End of London.
- Craig Leon Ainge, Premises Development Manager, NHS Bedfordshire. For services to Healthcare.
- Cathlyn Ainsworth, Chairman, Abbeyfield Southport Society. For voluntary service to Older People.
- James Aitken, Director, Centre of Sport and Exercise, University of Edinburgh. For services to Student Sport.
- Lynda Heather Allan, Executive Officer, Inspectorate Team Support, UK Border Agency, Home Office.
- Malcolm Allen, Psychiatric Nurse and Ward Manager, Tees, Esk and Wear Valleys NHS Foundation Trust. For services to Mental Healthcare.
- Ronika Amin, Grade D, Ministry of Defence.
- Leonard Andrews. For voluntary service to Brass Band Music in Warrington, Cheshire.
- Gitty Ankers. For services to the Recycling and Waste Industries in Cornwall.
- Norah Lillian Appleby. For services to the community in Mickleover, Derby.
- Mary Julia Archer. For services to the community in Halesowen, West Midlands.
- Sally Arkley, Director, Women's Business Development Agency. For services to Women's Enterprise.
- Hilda Armstrong, lately Senior Physiotherapy and Orthotic Assistant. For services to the NHS and to the community in Chester-le-Street, County Durham.
- Harry Arnold. For services to Inland Waterways.
- Moira Elizabeth Arthur, lately Managing Director, Peters Bookselling Services. For services to Children's Libraries.
- Marjorie Mavis Atkinson. For services to Older People in East and West Harptree, Bristol.
- Miranda Avanzi, Exchequer Funds Manager, Exchequer Funds and Accounts Team, HM Treasury.
- Charles William Back. For services to the community in Taunton, Somerset.
- Deborah Baddoo. For services to British Dance.
- Dr. Michael Bailey. For services to Industrial Archaeology.
- Robert James Mundell Baillie. For services to the Boys' Brigade in Scotland. (Deceased. To be dated 4 May 2010.)
- Robert John Baird. For services to Youth Justice in Leeds.
- Peter Gore De-Vaux Balbirnie. For services to the community in Essex.
- Stephen Barkby. For charitable services.
- Sandra Elizabeth Barnes, Leader, South Northamptonshire District Council. For services to Local Government.
- June Barnett. For voluntary service to the Leukaemia Research Fund and Cancer Leukaemia in Children.
- Michael Anthony Tudor Trevor-Barnston, JP, DL. For services to the community in Cheshire.
- Derek William Barr, lately Chief Executive, Fairfield Halls, Croydon. For services to Music and to the Arts.
- Ann Marie Barrett. For services to the community in Tullycarnet and Castlereagh, Northern Ireland.
- Christopher John Barrows, Chairman of Governors, Coombes Church of England Primary School, Wokingham, Berkshire. For voluntary service to Education.
- William Noel Barton, Constable, Police Service of Northern Ireland. For services to the Police.
- Dr. Robert Harold Bateman, Technical Consultant, Microssmass UK. For services to Science.
- Councillor Graham Baxter, Leader, North East Derbyshire District Council. For services to Local Government.
- Rhoda Ardill Baxter. For services to People with Disabilities in Northern Ireland.
- Robin Spencer Baynes. For services to the community in Liverpool.
- Professor Stephen Roger Bazire, Chief Pharmacist, Norfolk and Waveney Mental Health NHS Foundation Trust. For services to Pharmacy.
- Lorna Harriett Isobelle Beacom. For voluntary service to the Prevention of Domestic Abuse in Northern Ireland.
- Peter Beaty. For services to the community in Newton Aycliffe, County Durham.
- Anne Beer, Senior Adviser, Staffordshire Trading Standards. For services to Consumers.
- Sally Bell, Associate Director of Emergency Preparedness, NHS Yorkshire and the Humber. For services to Nursing.
- Andrew Richard Bennett, TD, Grade C1, Ministry of Defence.
- Martin Bennett, Joint Chairman and Managing Director, Associated Chemists (Wicker) Ltd. For services to Pharmacy in Sheffield.
- Alan Bernstein. For services to Young People in Kent.
- Francis Arthur Betteridge. For services to the Voluntary Sector in Sandwell, West Midlands.
- Ellis Aubrey John Bevan. For services to the community in Stoke-on-Trent, Staffordshire.
- Anita Suzanne Bew. For services to the communities in Marlborough, Wiltshire and in Gunjar, The Gambia.
- Gwenda Binks, Trade Union Representative, Valuation Office Agency London, HM Revenue and Customs.
- Gerald Blackburn. For voluntary service to the HMS Dorsetshire Association.
- Alison Blackshaw, lately Head of Administration, Communications Department, Prime Minister's Office.
- Agnes Glass Blair. For services to Healthcare and to Respiratory Services in Northern Ireland.
- Rosemary Elizabeth Blakesley. For services to the community in Ashover, Derbyshire.
- Virginia Blakey, Head of Tobacco Policy Branch, Welsh Assembly Government.
- Councillor Keith Bland. For services to the community in Warrington, Cheshire.
- Donald Blue. For services to Health and Safety.
- Judith Boardman, Chair of Governors, City of Westminster College, London. For voluntary service to Further Education.
- Norman James Bone. Senior Vice-President, SELEX Galileo, Finmeccanica Group. For services to the Defence Industry.
- Janet Booth, Grade E1, Ministry of Defence.
- John Bosworth. For services to Bridge End Gardens, Saffron Walden, Essex.
- Marie Boyd, Deputy Principal, Finance and European Division, Department for Employment and Learning, Northern Ireland Executive.
- David Wilson Braddock, Governor, Ferndown Upper School, Dorset. For voluntary service to Education.
- Lorraine Terry Brett, Foster Carer, Lancashire. For services to Children and Families.
- Ralph Brett, Foster Carer, Lancashire. For services to Children and Families.
- Joan Maureen Brier, Chair of Corporation, Rotherham College of Arts and Technology. For voluntary service to Further Education.
- David Rankin Briggs, Director, Corporate Services, Lisburn City Council. For services to Local Government in Northern Ireland.
- Councillor Loraine Morgan-Brinkhurst. For services to the community in Bath and North East Somerset.
- Kathleen Bromilow, Constable, Lancashire Constabulary. For services to the Police.
- Michael Brooker. For services to the Hotel Industry.
- Alick Brown. For voluntary service to SSAFA Forces Help in Hampshire.
- David John Mcgregor Brown, Chairman, Safety Letterbox Company Ltd, Neath Port Talbot. For services to Business.
- Mary Brown. For public service.
- Norman Arthur Brown. For services to the community in Sawbridgeworth, Hertfordshire.
- Stephen Royston Brown. For voluntary service to Disadvantaged People in Manchester.
- Angela Bruno. For voluntary service to the White Lily Fund Cancer Charity in the West of Scotland.
- Margaret Paradine Bull. For voluntary service to Save the Children in Whitby, North Yorkshire.
- Dr. John Francis Burke. For voluntary service to Cancer Patients and their Families in Wales.
- Elizabeth June Butler. For services to Electoral Services in Northern Ireland.
- Mary Cains, Housekeeper, Prime Minister's Office.
- Elizabeth Campbell. For charitable services in Northern Ireland.
- Joan Campbell. For services to Skills Development in the Tourist Industry in Scotland.
- Rosalind Campbell. For voluntary service to the War Widows' Association.
- Vanne Campbell. For voluntary service to Iveagh Branch Pony Club in Northern Ireland.
- Elizabeth Carlisle. For services to Women in Northern Ireland.
- Bryan Charles Carnes, Chief Executive, North Staffordshire Chamber of Commerce and Industry. For services to Business.
- Alan Michael Carr. For charitable services.
- Anthony Carr, Academy Director, West Ham United. For services to Football.
- Denise Ann Carroll. For voluntary service to the Milli's Child Contact Centre in Jersey.
- Joyce Carroll. For services to the Administration of Justice and to the community in the North East.
- Gloria Atkinson-Carter, Administrator, University of Winchester. For services to Higher Education.
- Peter Morton Carter. For services to the community in Reading, Berkshire.
- Margretta Cartwright. For services to the community in Talybont, Gwynedd.
- Raymond Case, lately Reprographics Operator, Tribunals Service, Ministry of Justice.
- Councillor David Murray Caunt. For services to Local Government in Dudley, West Midlands.
- Roy James Cavanagh, Labour and Training Manager, G. & J. Seddon Ltd. For services to the Construction Industry.
- Donald Scott Charlton. For voluntary service to the Scouts in the North East.
- Lisa Charlton. For voluntary service to Disabled People in Tyne and Wear.
- Peter Chesher. For voluntary service to Green Road station, Cumbria.
- Janice Childs. For services to Elderly People in Irthingborough, Northamptonshire.
- Eva Mair Jean Chinnery. For services to the community in Brecon, Powys.
- Raymonde Chintoh, Executive Officer, Jobcentre Plus, Department for Work and Pensions.
- Jack Chippendale. For services to the Boat Building Industry.
- Susan Jane Clapham. For public service.
- Muriel Clarke. For services to the community in Northern Ireland.
- Pamela Arundel Clarke. For services to the community in West Yorkshire.
- Ruth Clarke, Community Learning Manager London, National Trust. For services to Heritage and to the Arts.
- Terence Alan Clarke, Assistant Headteacher and Arts Co-ordinator, Langley School, Solihull. For services to Education.
- William Gordon Clarke. For voluntary service to Haemophiliac Patients in Northern Ireland.
- Joan Louisa Coates. For services to the community in Alresford, Colchester, Essex.
- Pauline Cocker, lately Chair of the Corporation, Birkenhead Sixth Form College, Wirral. For voluntary service to Education.
- Diane Coggings, Clinical Lead Physiotherapist for Paediatrics, Tower Hamlets Primary Care Trust. For services to Healthcare.
- William Patrick Colquhoun, Director, Medical Support in Romania. For services to Healthcare Overseas.
- Terence James Connell, Grade C1, Ministry of Defence.
- Pamela Florence Connock. For services to the community in Skellingthorpe, Lincolnshire.
- Simon Henry Cooke, Governor, Newport Free Grammar School, Essex. For voluntary service to Education.
- Roger John Cooper. For services to Forestry.
- David Coulthard. For services to Motor Racing.
- Robin Courage. For services to Disability Sport.
- Jeremy Robert Cowhig, Managing Director, Institute of Physics Publishing. For services to Science.
- Robert Cowley. For services to the community in Dorset.
- Jeffrey Robert Cowton, Curator, Wordsworth Trust. For services to Museums.
- Anne Veronica Craig. For services to the Knowledge Transfer Sector.
- Mary Elizabeth Crook. For services to Young People in Cornwall.
- Thomas Patrick Cunningham, Harbourmaster, Carlingford Lough Commission. For services to the Maritime Industry in Northern Ireland.
- Carlton Leroy Darrell. For services to the community in Thurrock, Essex.
- Prakash Daswani, Founder and Chief Executive Officer, Cultural Co-operation. For services to the Arts.
- Roy Frederick Davidson, Deputy Chief Commissioner, Scotland. For voluntary service to the Scouts.
- Dorothy Ursula Cleaton Davies, District Nurse. For services to Healthcare in Llandrindod Wells, Powys.
- Glyndŵr David George Davies, Director of International Affairs, Economic and Social Research Council. For services to Social Science.
- Paul Davies. For services to Music in Oxfordshire.
- Jenifer Margaret Dawes. For services to St. Katherine and Shadwell Trust, East London.
- Richard Best De La Rue. For services to Music and to the community in Guernsey.
- Sir John Humphrey de Trafford, Bt. For public service.
- Dr. Cedric Walter Benedict De Voil, General Medical Practitioner. For services to the community in Tayside.
- Elizabeth Jane Dearden, DL. For services to the community in St. Helens, Merseyside.
- Bernard Delaney, Director, National Express Coventry. For services to Public Transport.
- Anthony Hugh Dent, Diversity and Human Rights Officer, National Policing Improvement Agency. For services to the Police.
- Eileen Derbyshire, Actor. For services to Drama.
- Maria Desmond, Deputy Chair, Independent Monitoring Board, HM Prison Kirkham. For services to the community in Lancashire.
- Danusia Donata, Lady Trotman-Dickenson, Chair, Welsh Heritage Schools Initiative. For services to Education.
- Fred Dinenage, Television Presenter. For services to Broadcasting.
- Ursula Dingle. For services to Disabled People in Jersey.
- John Divall, Corporate Affairs Director, South Central Ambulance Services. For services to the Ambulance Service in England.
- Sandra Mary Docking, lately Grade C1, Ministry of Defence.
- Elizabeth Margaret Douglas. For voluntary service to the British Red Cross and to the community in Dumfries and Galloway.
- Patricia Anne Douglas. For services to Dance in Edinburgh.
- Dr. Frank Carter Duckworth. For services to the Royal Statistical Society and to Cricket.
- John Edward Duggan, Activities Organiser, Huddersfield University of the Third Age. For voluntary service to Adult Education.
- David John Dumbleton. For services to the Church of England and to Charity in Coventry, West Midlands.
- Dennis Dunn, Dean and Pro-Vice-Chancellor, Manchester Metropolitan University Cheshire. For services to Higher Education.
- Norman Dunn, lately Chief Executive, Newtownabbey Borough Council. For services to Local Government in Northern Ireland.
- Yvette Marguerite Therese Dutton, Grade C1, Ministry of Defence.
- Shirley Ann Dyer, Caretaker, College Park Infant School, Portsmouth. For services to Education.
- Peter James Eaglesfield, lately Non-Executive Director, NHS Wirral. For services to Healthcare.
- Alan Edwards, Senior Executive Officer, Homelessness Legislation, Housing Directorate, Department for Communities and Local Government.
- Maxine Patricia Edwards. For services to Women's Rugby.
- Stuart Edwards, Deputy Head of Security, Driver and Vehicle Licensing Agency, Swansea.
- William Ioan Edwards, Chairman of Governors, Glyncoed Comprehensive School, Ebbw Vale. For voluntary service to Education in Wales.
- Oku Anwan Ekpenyon. For voluntary service to the History of Black British People.
- Dr. Salah El-Sharkawi, Consultant Clinical Oncologist, South West Wales Cancer Centre, Swansea. For services to Medicine.
- Alyson Grace Ellis. For charitable services in South East London.
- Marie Erwood, Assistant Headteacher, Stewards School, Harlow, Essex. For services to Education.
- Avril Everett. For services to Cornwall Fire and Rescue Service and to the Firefighters' Charity.
- Irene Elizabeth Falloon. For services to the community in Northern Ireland.
- Angela May Farr, Agriculture Accounts Manager, Finance Department, Welsh Assembly Government.
- Peter Farr, Chairman, Bristol Community Housing Foundation. For services to Social Housing.
- Margaret Farrar, lately Service Manager, Vine, Leeds. For services to Adult Education for Young People with Disabilities.
- John Patrick Farrell, Pharmacy Services Manager, Camden and Islington Pharmacy Service. For services to Healthcare.
- Alan Farrer, Principal Officer, HM Prison Haverigg, Cumbria, HM Prison Service.
- Susan Maria Farrington (Mrs. Doble). For services to British Heritage in Pakistan.
- Charles Richard Ferens, DL. For services to the community in Lincolnshire.
- Pamela Filer. For voluntary service to Victim Support in Hertfordshire.
- Stuart William Fisher. For voluntary service to the West Midlands Fire and Rescue Service Road Casualty Reduction Team.
- Vanessa Fison. For services to the community in Richmond, Surrey.
- James Henry Fitchie. For services to Ploughing in Northern Ireland.
- Margaret Elizabeth Flint, Senior Administrative Officer, West Yorkshire Probation Board. For services to Offenders.
- Peter Flukes. For services to the community in Wolseley, Plymouth.
- Maurice John Ford. For services to the community in Northamptonshire.
- Margaret Ann Forisky, Development Officer, West Lothian College. For services to Further Education.
- Carol Foster, ICT Teacher, Lakeside School, Chandler's Ford, Hampshire. For services to Special Needs Education.
- Michelle Vicki Fowler (Vicki Michelle). For charitable services.
- William Andrew Francey, Director, Health and Environmental Services, Belfast City Council. For services to Local Government in Northern Ireland.
- William Terence Francis, Head, School of Business Innovation and Development, South Eastern Regional College. For services to Further Education in Northern Ireland.
- George Edwards Fraser. For voluntary service to the Burma Star Association in Aberdeen.
- Hugh Wilson Fraser. For services to the community in Dumfries.
- Janice Patricia Fraser, Carers Planning and Development Officer, Leicestershire County Council. For services to Local Government.
- Diana Mary Freeman. For services to Geography Education in Hertfordshire.
- Dennis George Frost. For voluntary service to Young People in Wales.
- Rita Pauline Fryer. For services to the community in Aldeburgh, Suffolk.
- Fay Fullerton, Head, Production Costume, Royal Opera House. For services to Dance and to Opera.
- John Alexander Fullerton. For services to Sports Journalism and to the community in Northern Ireland.
- Dr. Mahvash Hussain-Gambles, Founder and Chief Executive, Saaf International Ltd. For services to the Beauty Industry and to International Trade.
- Councillor Derek Davies Games. For services to Local Government and to the community in Merthyr Tydfil.
- Halina Gammie. For services to Study Support and Playing for Success.
- Richard David Gammon. For services to the community in Bristol.
- Irene Dorothy Garrard. For voluntary service to Bedford Hospital Charity.
- Michael Garrick, Jazz Pianist and Composer. For services to Music.
- The Reverend Vernon Frederick George. For services to the community in the London Borough of Barnet and Sri Lanka.
- Susan Gibbs, Station Announcer, c2c Rail Ltd, London Fenchurch Street. For services to Public Transport.
- Andrew Gibson. For services to Young People in Scotswood, Newcastle upon Tyne.
- Pamela Gibson, Executive Officer, Employment Group, Sheffield, Department for Work and Pensions.
- Bakhtiar Ahmad Gilani. For services to the community in Greater Manchester.
- Robert Charles Gilliat, Chairman, Crime Prevention Panel, Devon and Cornwall. For voluntary service to the Police.
- Judith Gillow, Director of Nursing and Infection Prevention and Control, Southampton University Hospitals NHS Trust. For services to Healthcare.
- Linda Joy Christine Ginn. For services to Health and Community Caring in Westleton, Suffolk.
- Edana Gledhill. For services to the community in Blackpool, Lancashire.
- Councillor Alan Frederick Gloak, Member, Somerset County Council. For services to Local Government.
- Michael Peter Glogg. For voluntary service to Rugby.
- Karen Elizabeth Goldstone, Head, East Anglian Regional Radiation Protection Service. For services to Healthcare.
- Nora Theresa Goodman. For services to the community in Southend-on-Sea, Essex.
- Dr. Rigby Graham, Mural Painter and Illustrator. For services to the Arts.
- Angela Helen Grandfield, lately PE Teacher and Pastoral Manager, Shire Oak School, Walsall. For services to Education.
- Victor William Gray. For services to Archivists.
- John Curtis Green. For voluntary service to the Helford River Children's Sailing Trust.
- Captain John William Green. For services to the community in Cumbria.
- Mary Constance Elizabeth Green. For services to Children and Families in Hastings, East Sussex.
- Margaret Greenway, lately Commissioning Services Resource Manager, Kent Probation Area. For services to Offenders.
- Keith Grimshaw. For services to National Savings and Investments and to the Magistracy.
- Christine Gubbins, Foster Carer, Hampshire. For services to Children and Families.
- Elsie Doreen Gunning. For voluntary service to Deaf People in South Wales.
- Councillor Adrian John Gunson, Member, Norfolk County Council. For services to Local Government.
- Maria Elisabeth Haddow. For services to the community in Shilbottle, Northumberland.
- Samuel Haire. For services to the community in Clabby, Northern Ireland.
- Anne Elizabeth Sylvia Hale. For services to the community in Stamford, Lincolnshire.
- Alfred Hales, For charitable services in Bolton, Lancashire.
- Stephen Halloran, Clinical Biochemist, Royal Surrey County Hospital, Guildford and Director, Bowel Cancer Screen Hub, South of England. For services to Healthcare.
- Michael Hamilton. For services to the Voluntary Sector.
- Lewis Gustav Hammond, Evesham Town Partnership Manager, Wychavon District Council. For services to Local Government.
- Barbara Mary Hamzawi, JP, Personal Assistant, University for Industry. For services to Further Education.
- Anne Hanley, lately Senior Probation Officer, HM Prison Buckley Hall, Rochdale. For services to Offenders.
- Jo Hansford. For services to the Hairdressing Industry.
- Karen Hanton, Founder of toptable.com. For services to the Restaurant Industry.
- Pauline Mary Frost-Hardwick. For services to the community in Burnley, Lancashire.
- David Ralph Hardy. For services to the Construction Industry.
- Susan Harmsworth, Chief Executive, ESPA. For services to the Spa and Beauty Industry.
- Elizabeth Jane Harries. For voluntary service to Young People in Wales and to International Peacework.
- Jacqueline Harrison, head of public relations, West Midlands Police. For services to the Police.
- Loveday Annie Harrison. For services to the community in Altarnum, Cornwall.
- June Marian Hart. For services to the British Group of the Inter-Parliamentary Union.
- Lynn Georgina Hart, Chief Superintendent, Bournemouth and Poole Divisional Commander, Dorset Police. For services to the Police.
- Irene Grace Hartley. For services to the community in Rotherham, South Yorkshire.
- Peter Hartshorne, Constable, South Yorkshire Police. For services to the Police.
- Sajid Hashmi. For services to the Voluntary Sector in Stoke-on-Trent, Staffordshire.
- The Reverend David Haslam. For services to Community Relations and to the Methodist Church.
- Daryl Hayler, Integration and Systems Validation Engineer, MBDA UK Ltd. For services to the Defence Industry.
- Dr. Peter John Hayward, Chairman, Friends of Dronfield Station. For services to the community in Dronfield, Derbyshire.
- Richard Lenfestey Heaume. For voluntary service to the Occupation Museum and Society in Guernsey.
- Catherine Hegarty, Nursery Nurse, Knotty Ash Primary School, Liverpool. For services to Special Needs Education.
- Alexandra Mary Henderson, lately Chair of the Corporation, Hull Group of Colleges. For voluntary service to Further Education.
- Councillor Michael John Henderson, Member, Castlereagh Borough Council. For services to Local Government in Northern Ireland.
- Robert Hetherington, District Manager, Jobcentre Plus, Norfolk, Department for Work and Pensions.
- John Geraint Hicks. For voluntary service to Disabled People.
- Patricia Ellen Hickson. For voluntary service to the community in South Bermondsey, London.
- Jane Thornton Higgs. For services to the Heritage of Eden Valley in Kent.
- Joan Gladys Hill, Senior Executive Officer, Child Support Agency, Child Maintenance and Enforcement Commission, Department for Work and Pensions.
- Michael Roderick Hill. For voluntary service to St. John Ambulance in Bath.
- Professor Lubaina Himid, Artist. For services to Black Women's Art.
- Pauline Hitt, lately Head of Department, Isle of Wight College. For services to Further Education.
- Sheelagh Teresa O'Flaherty-Hobbs. For voluntary service in RAF Odiham, Hampshire.
- Peter Lionel Leon Hodge. For voluntary service to the Normandy Veterans' Association.
- Michael Hoeg. For services to Music in Cardiff.
- Patricia Ann Holdsworth, Assistant Chief Officer, Metropolitan Special Constabulary. For voluntary service to the Police.
- Geoffrey Trevor Marden Holt. For services to Disability Sailing.
- Ian Mackinnell Hope. For services to the community in West Cornwall.
- Alan John Hopgood, Ticket Office Manager, South West Trains, Teddington station. For services to Public Transport.
- William Guy Shubra Hordern. For services to Community Relations in Birmingham.
- Jonathan Kenneth Horne. For services to Medieval Ceramics.
- Judith Ish-Horowicz, Headteacher, Synagogue Religion School, Wandsworth, London. For services to Early Years Education.
- Julian Hoskins, Apprentice Training Co-ordinator, Science and Technology Facilities Council. For services to Engineering.
- Veronica Daphne Hoskins. For services to the community in Bath.
- Margaret Elizabeth Houghton. For voluntary service to Choral Music in Cambridgeshire.
- Mary Audrey Hoy. For voluntary service to Save the Children in Eltham, London.
- John Percival Hughes, Founder and Proprietor, Grogg Shop, Pontypridd, Rhondda Cynon Taff. For services to the Ceramics Industry in Wales.
- Christine Hulse. For services to the community in Greater Manchester.
- David Thomas McMillan Hunter. For services to Scottish Heritage and to Young People.
- Marcia Ann Hutchinson, Director, Primary Colours Ltd, Huddersfield. For services to Cultural Diversity.
- Stephen Huxley, Search and Rescue Communications Manager, HM Coastguard, Maritime and Coastguard Agency.
- David Hymers, Managing Director, Totalpost Services plc. For services to Business and to International Trade.
- Hanan Ally Ibrahim, Founder, Somali Family Support Group. For services to Black and Minority Ethnic People.
- John Sidney Idiens. For voluntary service to the National Trust in Norfolk.
- Mike Ingham, Chief Football Correspondent, BBC Radio 5 Live. For services to Sports Broadcasting.
- Abida Iqbal. For services to the community in London Borough of Redbridge.
- Dawn Jackson. For services to Young People in Norwich.
- Morgan Pringle Gardner Jamieson, lately National Clinical Lead for Children's and Young People's Health in Scotland. For services to Healthcare.
- Derek Jenkins, Higher Executive Officer, Child Support Agency, Child Maintenance and Enforcement Commission, Department for Work and Pensions.
- Pamela Mary Jennings. For services to the community in Aston-on-Clun, Shropshire.
- Kevin Johns, Broadcaster and Entertainer. For charitable services in Wales.
- David Austin Johnston. For public service.
- The Reverend Andrew John Jolly, Chaplain. For services to the UK Oil and Gas Industries in Scotland.
- Bethan Jones, Project Manager, True Food Marketing. For services to the Food and Drink Industry in Wales.
- Christina Rowland-Jones. For services to Mental Healthcare in Cambridgeshire.
- Claire Jones. For charitable services in Hertfordshire.
- Daphne Georgina Jones. For services to Young People with Disabilities and their Families in Croydon.
- Karen Jones. For services to Women's and Girls' Football in Wales.
- Kenneth Jones. For services to the Ironbridge Gorge World Heritage Site, Shropshire.
- Margaret Ann Jones, Head, YMCA Wales Community College. For services to Further Education.
- Martin Jones, lately Manager, Motor Services Unit, Scottish Executive.
- Neil Roger Jones. For voluntary service to Mountain Rescue in North Wales.
- Vernon Jones. For voluntary service to Education in Newport, South Wales.
- Preihdath Joyram. For voluntary service to Cruse Bereavement in Lancashire.
- Dennis Jubb. For services to People with Dementia in Doncaster.
- Mary Judd. For services to the community in High Pittington, County Durham.
- Jennifer Kartupelis, Director, East of England Faiths Council. For services to Inter-faith Relations.
- Raymond George Kasey. For voluntary service to Save the Children in Sutton, Surrey.
- Frederick Rockley Kaye. For voluntary service to the Royal British Legion Scotland.
- Donna Victoria Kellogg. For services to Badminton.
- Doreen Kelly. For services to the community in Didsbury, Manchester.
- Philip Julian Kelsall, Resident Organist, Tower Ballroom, Blackpool. For services to Music.
- John Richard Kemish. For services to the community in Worthing, West Sussex.
- Jennifer Kent, JP. For voluntary service to Gymnastics in Bexleyheath, Kent.
- Elizabeth Kerr, Chair, Powderham Castle Riding for the Disabled Group. For voluntary service to Disabled Children in Exeter.
- Michael Peter King, lately Grade C1, Ministry of Defence.
- Valerie King. For services to the community in Derbyshire.
- Barbara Ann Kinsella. For services to the community in Cemaes Bay, Anglesey.
- Jean Kirkwood. For voluntary service to Visually Impaired People in Swansea.
- Suzanne Kitching, Manager, Families First Service, Middlesbrough. For services to Children and Families.
- Frank Knapton. For services to the community in Mexborough, South Yorkshire.
- Patricia Knowles, Senior Social Worker, HIV Services, Royal Victoria Hospital, Belfast. For services to Healthcare.
- Barbara Knox, Actor. For services to Drama.
- Mario Franz Kreft, Chief Executive, Care Forum Wales. For services to Social Care.
- Councillor Joy Hazvirehwi Laguda. For services to the community in the London Borough of Newham.
- Peter Lake. For voluntary service to Surf Life Saving.
- Susan Langford. For services to the Magic Me charity.
- Councillor Palma Laughton, Chairman, Stanhope Parish Council. For services to the community in Stanhope, Ashford, Kent.
- Charles Spencer Leader. For voluntary service to the Royal British Legion in St. Annes-on-Sea, Lancashire.
- Joyce Ledgard. For voluntary service to the Girls' Brigade in Wrexham.
- Christopher Wilson Lee. For services to Young People in Romford, Essex.
- Dr. Anthony John Lewis. For services to Mathematics and to Cricket.
- David Lewis, Chairman of Governors, Whitefield School, Barnet, London. For services to Education.
- David Gethin Lewis. For services to the community in South West Wales.
- Essie Nell Lewis. For voluntary service to Older African and Caribbean People in Wolverhampton.
- Frances Lewis, Founder and Executive Director, SPLITZ. For services to Single Parents and to Victims of Domestic Abuse.
- Patricia Lewis, Youth Leader, Banstead Youth Centre, Surrey. For services to Young People.
- Geraldine Ling, Artistic Director, Lawnmowers Theatre Group. For services to People with Special Needs in Tyne and Wear.
- Robert Ian Lipscomb, Senior Aviation Security Policy Adviser, Transport Security and Contingencies Directorate, Department for Transport.
- David John Lister. For voluntary service to Young People.
- John Thomas Lister. For services to Athletics.
- William George Little. For services to the community in Dartington, Devon.
- John Frank Lloyd. For services to Cycling in Mid and North Wales.
- John Howson Lloyd. For voluntary service to Liverpool Cathedral.
- Lieutenant Colonel Peter John Lockyer, Grade C1, Ministry of Defence.
- Sara Locock, JP, DL. For services to the community in Hampshire.
- Diane Lofthouse. For services to the Prevention of Disability Hate Crime.
- Edyth Lovell. For services to the community in Northern Ireland.
- Robert Loynes, Firearms Medical Adviser, Staffordshire. For voluntary service to the Police.
- Elizabeth Anne MacDermott, Grade D, Ministry of Defence.
- Hugh James MacKay, Group Technical Director, Stewart Milne Group. For services to the Timber Industry.
- Iain Archibald MacLeod. For services to Stornoway Port Authority and to the community in Stornoway.
- Dionis Maisie MacNair, Verderer. For services to the New Forest, Hampshire.
- Nancy Magrath, Principal, Edenderry Nursery School. For services to Education in Northern Ireland.
- Councillor Ernest Mallett, Member, Surrey County Council. For services to Local Government.
- Vithaldas Jeram Mamtora. For voluntary service to Older Asian People in Greater Manchester.
- Paul Marsh, lately Principal Officer, HM Prison Canterbury, HM Prison Service.
- Catherine Mary Marshall, Assistant Headteacher, Wyvern School, Ashford, Kent. For services to Special Needs Education.
- Pieter Marteau. For services to Oxfam.
- Amanda Martin, Director and General Manager, Park Avenue Hotel. For services to the Tourist Industry in Northern Ireland.
- Janet Frances Martin. For services to the Examinations Officer Association.
- Julia Carol Mason, Customer Services Manager, Customer Services Group, Southampton, Valuation Office Agency.
- Samuel Vernon Mather. For services to the community in Beeley and Edensor, Derbyshire.
- Karen Mattison, Director, Women Like Us. For services to Social Enterprises.
- David Maurice, Chairman of Governors, Kenmore Park First School and Kenmore Park Middle School, Harrow, London. For voluntary service to Education.
- The Reverend Thomas Veitch Mawhinney. For voluntary service to Education in Limavady, Northern Ireland.
- Anthony John Maxse. For charitable services in Hampshire.
- Clive May, Grade E2, Ministry of Defence.
- Mary Elizabeth McAdam. For services to Agriculture in Northern Ireland.
- David McAdam. For services to the community in Dumfries and Galloway.
- Angus McCall. For services to Tenant Farming in Scotland.
- William Kyle McCallan. For services to Cricket in Northern Ireland.
- Mary Kathleen McCarthy. For voluntary service to Charlie's Angels Youth Fund-raising Group, Eton-Wick-Windsor, Berkshire.
- Alison Anne McCaughan. For public service.
- Janet McCheyne. For services to the community in Bulphan, Essex.
- John McCormick. For services to Young People in Northern Ireland.
- Jennifer Ann McDonald. For services to Humanitarian Aid in Bosnia.
- Michelle McDowell, Structural Engineering Director, Building Design Partnership. For services to the Construction Industry.
- Peter Geoffrey McEwen, Secretary, National Union of Maritime, Aviation and Shipping Transport Welfare Funds. For services to the Maritime Industry.
- David Anthony McGuigan, Manager, Longbenton Youth Project, Newcastle upon Tyne. For services to Young People.
- Jacqueline McKenna, Director of Nursing and Strategic Planning, Medway NHS Foundation Trust. For services to Healthcare.
- Baron McLean, Executive Officer, Staff Support Network, UK Border Agency, Home Office.
- Dr. Alexina Mary McWhinnie. For services to Adoption, Fostering and Assisted Reproduction.
- Audrey Elizabeth Mealins. For voluntary service to Sufferers of Coeliac Disease in East Wales.
- Sylvia Medland. For services to the General Dental Council.
- Edwin Thomas Menday, Governor, Longford Community School, Hounslow, London. For voluntary service to Education.
- Carol Metters. For services to Disadvantaged Women and Children in Bristol.
- Neil Duncan Middleton, Chairman of Governors, City of Bristol College. For voluntary service to Further Education.
- Eric Milburn. For voluntary service to the Methodist Association of Youth Clubs.
- Thomas Millen, Mentor and Adviser, Learning Disabilities Team, Northumberland Care Trust. For services to Healthcare.
- Margaret Mills. For voluntary service to Lancashire Police and to Charity.
- Margaret Mather Mineham, Curriculum Manager, Cleveland College of Art and Design. For services to Further Education.
- Stephen Mitchell, Assistant Headteacher, Shelthorpe Community Primary School, Loughborough. For services to Education.
- Robert Edward Mizon, National Co-ordinator, Campaign for Dark Skies. For voluntary service to Astronomy and to the Environment.
- Veena Kumari Mohindra, Executive Officer, Jobcentre Plus, Department for Work and Pensions.
- Gillian Fennings-Monkman. For services to Women's Enterprise.
- Michael Moran, lately Chairman, Herefordshire and Worcestershire Chamber of Commerce and Chief Executive Officer, J. & J. Investments Ltd. For services to Commerce.
- Thomas Joseph Moran. For voluntary service to Older People in Wales.
- Dr. Constance Ada Mary Llewellyn-Morgan, Chair of Trustees, Ty Bryngwyn Hospice, Llanelli. For services to Palliative Care in Carmarthenshire.
- Susan Morgan, Macmillan Clinical Nurse Specialist. For services to Healthcare in Wales.
- Pamela Morris, Secretary, Minerva Sports and Social Association, Department for Business, Innovation and Skills.
- Nora Morrison. For services to Dance and to Charity in Nottingham.
- Ronald Michael Moss. For services to the community in East Surrey.
- Thirza Mullins, Deputy Justices Clerk, Camberwell Green Magistrates' Court, Her Majesty's Courts Service.
- James Bone Murray. For services to The Duke of Edinburgh's Award Scheme in Scotland.
- Robert Martin Neville. For services to the National Air Traffic Services Trade Union.
- Mary Ann Nightingale, Chair, Lunt Tenants' and Residents' Association. For services to the community in Bilston, Wolverhampton.
- Moira Niven, Head of Education Development, West Lothian Council. For services to Education.
- Christina Campbell Noble. For services to Community Development in Argyll.
- Pamela Margaret Noden, Foster Carer, Bradford. For services to Children and Families.
- Robert Noden, Foster Carer, Bradford. For services to Children and Families.
- Michael John Wright Norfolk. For services to Healthcare and to Fencing in Chester and Wrexham.
- Marie Nunn. For services to the community in Wiltshire.
- Dr. Martin Thomas O'Brien, lately Employment and Support Allowance Lead, Jobcentre Plus, Department for Work and Pensions.
- James Francis Patrick O'Neill, Criminal Investigation Officer, Risk and Intelligence Service, London, HM Revenue and Customs.
- Richard Ogden. For services to the Construction Industry.
- George Ozenbrook, Accommodation Officer, Facilities Management, Department for Children, Schools and Families.
- Stephen Timothy John Pack. For voluntary service to Lulworth Coastguard Rescue Station and Lulworth Responder Group, Dorset.
- Kathleen Mary Page. For services to Social Care in Milton Keynes, Buckinghamshire.
- Richard Pain, Assistant Traffic Manager (Special Events). For services to the City of London Corporation.
- Mary Patricia Paisey. For services to the community in Salisbury, Wiltshire.
- Sharon Palmer, Chief Executive, Regional Action West Midlands. For services to the Third Sector.
- Nicola Louise Pasek, Operations Manager, Trading Standards Service, Cambridgeshire County Council. For services to Consumers.
- Mukesh Patel, Administrative Officer, Customer Operations, Leicester, HM Revenue and Customs.
- Gary Frederick Payne. For voluntary service to the Sea Cadet Corps in London.
- Brian Peacock, lately Headteacher, Sunnyhurst Primary Pupil Referral Unit, Blackburn with Darwen. For services to Education.
- Elsie May Pearson. For services to the community in Martham, Norfolk.
- Elizabeth Jayne Peck, Senior Executive Officer, Pension, Disability and Carers' Service, Department for Work and Pensions.
- Margaret Elizabeth Penny. For services to Hockey in Northern Ireland and to the British Parachute Association.
- Melvyn Trevor Perkins. For services to Cycle Speedway and to Football.
- Benjamin Perl. For services to Jewish Education in the London Borough of Barnet.
- Cara Perrett. For services to Community Relations in Scotland.
- Alex Pettifer, Director, Estates and Facilities, Sheffield Hallam University. For services to Higher Education and to the community in Sheffield.
- Tony Clifford Phillips. For services to Youth Sport in Northern Ireland.
- Ann-Marie Pickup. For services to the community in Salford, Greater Manchester.
- Peter Kenneth Pinnell, lately Chairman, Groundwork Coventry and Warwickshire. For services to Regeneration.
- The Reverend Canon Suzanne Jane Pinnington. For services to the community in Cottingley, West Yorkshire.
- Michael Anthony Polledri, Chairman, Lee Valley Estates. For services to Enterprise and to Regeneration in North London.
- Derek Alan Pollock. For charitable services.
- Carys Eluned Marslene Portelli, Senior Executive Assistant, People, Places and Corporate Services, Welsh Assembly Government.
- Margaret Jacqueline Postgate. For voluntary service to Girlguiding in Sedgefield, County Durham.
- Craig Powell, Grade C1, Ministry of Defence.
- Christopher John Pratt, Cutter Commander, UK Border Agency, Home Office.
- Malcolm Norman Pratt. For services to the community in Winchelsea and to Heritage in East Sussex.
- Edith Margaret Price. For charitable services.
- Dr. Sandy Primrose, Research Programme Adviser. For services to the Food Standards Agency and to Science.
- Margaret Edna Pritchard. For services to Brookside Residents' Council and to the community in Northampton.
- Professor Edwin John Pugh, Consultant in Palliative Medicine, North Tees and Hartlepool NHS Foundation Trust. For services to Medicine.
- Fiona Jennie Rawes, Director, Heart of the City. For services to Corporate Social Responsibility.
- Amanda Read, Child Welfare Issues Manager, UK Border Agency, Home Office.
- Bridget Redmond, lately Caretaker, Mount St. Mary's High School, Leeds. For voluntary service to Education.
- Stephen James Reeves. For services to Independent Monitoring Boards and to the Voluntary Sector.
- Anne Reid, Actor. For services to Drama.
- Elma Anne Rendall, Customer Service Officer, Royal Bank of Scotland. For services to the Financial Services Industry.
- Marlissa Soraya Beryl Richards, Higher Executive Officer, Child Support Agency, Child Maintenance and Enforcement Commission, Department for Work and Pensions.
- Yvonne Ann Richards. For services to Mental Healthcare in Worcestershire.
- Beryl Ann Riches. For services to Selwyn Primary School, London Borough of Newham, London.
- Sheila Rigg. For services to the community in Conisbrough, Doncaster.
- John William Ritter. For services to the community in Newport, South Wales.
- Elizabeth Robb, Principal Officer, HM Prison Wakefield, HM Prison Service.
- Anthony Charles Roberts. For voluntary service to Lewis-Manning Hospice, Poole, Dorset.
- Carole Anne Roberts. For services to North Wales Police.
- Alistair Raeburn Robertson. For voluntary service to SSAFA Forces Help in Inverness-shire.
- Ann Robertson. For services to the community in North Ayrshire.
- Eleanor Robertson. For services to Community Healthcare.
- Thomas James Robertson. For voluntary service to Queensferry Lifeboat, West Lothian.
- Evelyn Ivy Janet Robins, Principal, Eve Trew School of Dancing and Gateshead Children's Arts and Theatre School. For services to the Arts in the North East.
- Hill Robinson, JP. For voluntary service to Cancer Research UK in Strabane, Northern Ireland.
- Professor Iain Clive Andrew Franklyn Robinson, lately Head of Neurosciences Group, Medical Research Council, National Institute for Medical Research. For services to Science.
- Janet Mary Roe, Police Constable, Lancashire Constabulary. For services to the Police.
- William Kenneth Rollinson, Director, Care and Repair Leeds. For services to the Housing Sector.
- Major Robert David Roper, Salvation Army Chaplain, HM Prison Grendon, Buckinghamshire. For services to Offenders.
- Brenda Roscoe, Chief Inspector, Special Constabulary, Greater Manchester Police. For voluntary service to the Police.
- John William Rose, Dental Adviser, NHS Western Cheshire. For services to the NHS.
- Sylvia Elizabeth Rose. For voluntary service to the Market Garden Veterans' Association.
- Samuel William John Rusk. For services to Industry in Northern Ireland.
- Professor Guy Nathan Rutty, Home Office Pathologist, Leicester. For services to the Police.
- Sam Sagar, Police Community Support Officer, Bradford. For services to West Yorkshire Police.
- Harry Samuel. For voluntary service to Ex-Miners in Glynneath, Neath Port Talbot.
- Mary Sanders. For services to Young People in Cambridgeshire.
- Jean Saunderson. For voluntary service to Police Welfare in Northern Ireland.
- Dr. Edwin Sawacha. For services to Social Housing and to the community in North West London.
- Marzia Sayani, Executive Officer, Jobcentre Plus, Department for Work and Pensions.
- Kirsty Schneeberger, Co-ordinator, UK Youth Climate Coalition. For services to Environmental Conservation.
- Henrietta Scott. For services to Nursing in Glasgow.
- Steven Scott, Chairman, Dwarf Athletic Association UK. For services to Disability Sport.
- Anne Scovell, Regional Manager, Liverpool Office, Identity and Passport Service, Home Office.
- Marjorie Rose Seal. For voluntary service to Girlguiding in Kent.
- Ann Sevier, Special Constable, Hampshire Constabulary. For voluntary service to the Police.
- Christopher Shannon, Head Porter, Queen's University Belfast. For services to Higher Education.
- Philip Charles Shannon. For voluntary service to Sennen Cove Lifeboat, Cornwall.
- Cyril Raymond Shaw. For services to the Tribunals Service.
- Major Geoffrey George Simpson, TD, DL. For voluntary service to the community in Leicester.
- Roy Sinar. For services to Young People in the West Midlands.
- Catherine Skinner. For services to the community in Fearn, Ross-shire.
- Gillian Slinn. For voluntary service to Girlguiding and to the community in Anglesey.
- Helen Vivien Sloan. For services to the community in Northern Ireland.
- Stuart Edward Smalley, lately Head of International Developments, Department of Health.
- Councillor Stella Marie Smedley, JP, Member, Nottinghamshire County Council. For services to Local Government.
- Elizabeth Ann Smith, Police Community Support Officer, Bridlington. For services to Humberside Police.
- Julie Smith. For services to the Scouts and to the community in Cardiff.
- Julie Smith, Front Line Manager, Customer Operations, Cardiff, HM Revenue and Customs.
- Maureen Elizabeth Smith. For services to the community in Whitstable, Kent.
- Terence John Smith. For services to the community in Woking, Surrey.
- Valerie Elaine Smith. For services to the community in Wilsden, West Yorkshire.
- Major John Douglas Sneesby, Grade C2, Ministry of Defence.
- Balvinder Singh Sokhi. For services to the community in Nottingham.
- Margaret Ann Southren, Deputy Headteacher, Durham Trinity School. For services to Special Needs Education.
- Gary Andrew Speed. For services to Football.
- Raymond Spencer, Executive Director, Customs House, South Shields. For services to the Arts in the North East.
- Arthur George Spirling, Director of ICT, Imperial College London. For services to Higher Education.
- Loris Mercia Squirrell. For services to Inter-faith Relations in East Anglia.
- Yvonne Stanyer, Team Leader, Debt Management and Banking, Telford, HM Revenue and Customs.
- Dr. John Chester Stevens, lately Consultant Clinical Scientist, Audiology, Sheffield Teaching Hospital NHS Foundation Trust. For services to Healthcare.
- Michael David Stevens, Chairman of Governors, Oakwood Park Grammar School, Maidstone, Kent. For voluntary service to Education.
- Emma Stewart, Director, Women Like Us. For services to Social Enterprises.
- Jonathan Stewart, Country Manager Iraq, KBR. For services to the Defence Industry.
- Margaret Allison Stewart. For services to the Scottish Red Meat Industry.
- Diana Caulfeild-Stoker, Chief Operating Officer, Community Services, Wandsworth Primary Care Trust. For services to Healthcare.
- Kathleen Anne Stratton. For services to the community in Princes Risborough, Buckinghamshire.
- Ruby Stuckey. For services to the community in Grantham, Lincolnshire.
- Edith Audrey Swindells. For services to Bath Postal Museum.
- Delia Sykes, Mathematics Teacher, King Edward VI School, Morpeth, Northumberland. For services to Education.
- Jean Sykes, Chief Information Officer, London School of Economics and Political Science. For services to Higher Education.
- Doreen Sheila Symonds. For voluntary services to Save the Children in Weymouth and Portland.
- David Tait. For voluntary services to the NSPCC.
- Dr. John Stuart Talbot, Medical Adviser and Associate Medical Director, Salford Primary Care Trust. For services to Healthcare.
- Souad Talsi. For services to the British Moroccan community in London.
- Glenda Taylor, lately Governor, De Aston School, Market Rasen, Lincolnshire. For service to Education.
- Lesley Taylor. For services to the community in County Durham.
- Molly Ann Taylor. For voluntary service to Bedford Hospital Charity.
- William John Taylor, Chief Executive, West Lancashire District Council. For services to Local Government.
- Lady Harriot Tennant of Balfluig, lately Chairman, Chelsea Physic Garden. For services to Gardening.
- Glenys Thomas. For services to Older People in Carmarthenshire.
- Councillor John Thomas. For services to Local Government in South West Cornwall.
- Anne Elizabeth Thompson, Staff Nurse, Musgrave Park Hospital. For services to Healthcare in Northern Ireland.
- Susan Thompson, Technical Team Expert, Customer Operations, Newcastle upon Tyne, HM Revenue and Customs.
- Alan Thomson, Director, Orchardville Society. For services to People with Learning Disabilities in Northern Ireland.
- Jennifer Elizabeth Thorpe. For services to the Fire and Rescue Service.
- Dr. John Graham Tillett, Chairman of Governors, Colchester Royal Grammar School, Essex. For voluntary service to Education.
- Florence Tomlinson. For services to the community in Lancashire.
- Keith Tomlinson. For services to the community in Lancashire.
- Janet Ann Townsend, JP. For services to Music and to the community in Port Isaac, Cornwall.
- Michael Tracey, Managing Director, William Tracey Group. For services to the Waste Industry.
- Keith Leslie Tucker, lately Head of Estates Management Group, Medical Research Council. For services to Science.
- Michelle Turner, Founder and Proprietor, Little Venice Cake Company. For services to the Catering Industry.
- Nicola Jayne Tustain. For services to Disability Sport, particularly Equestrian.
- Peter Tyrie, Managing Director, The Eton Collection. For services to the Hotel Industry.
- Doreen Marion Underhill. For voluntary service to the Army Attaché Wives' Committee.
- Sophia Emma van den Arend. For voluntary service to the British Red Cross Society in Suffolk.
- Marion Vidler. For services to Civil Registration in the London Borough of Sutton.
- Doreen Walcott. For services to the community in Bellingham, South East London.
- Dr. Ann Wales, Director, Knowledge Management NHS Education for Scotland. For services to the NHS.
- Anne Walker, Founder and Partner, International Dance Supplies. For services to Business.
- Dr. Eric Walker, Consultant Physician and Epidemiologist. For services to Travel Medicine.
- Philip Walters. For services to Educational Publishing.
- Anthony Barry Warburton. For services to Owl Conservation.
- Anne Cameron Ward. For services to the community in Peterlee, County Durham.
- Susan Waring, Policy Adviser, Railway Pensions, Business Performance and Secretariat, Department for Transport.
- Hazel Elizabeth Waters, Workforce Information Assistant, Medway NHS Foundation Trust. For services to the NHS.
- Ethna Patricia Watterson. For voluntary service to the Parkinson's Disease Society in Northern Ireland.
- John Weightman. For services to the Independent Monitoring Board, HM Prison Castington, Northumberland.
- The Reverend William Derek Weir, Chaplain, RAF Aldergrove. For services to the Armed Forces.
- Irene Weller. For services to the Dorothy House Hospice in Bath, Somerset.
- Christine Ann Wellington. For services to Ironman Triathlons.
- Barbara Ann Westcott. For voluntary service to the Scouts in North East London.
- Joan Westerman, Manager, Logik Centre, University of Leeds. For services to Higher Education.
- Douglas Harold Michael Western. For services to the community in Devizes, Wiltshire.
- Richard Allen Westlake, lately Train Driver, First Great Western. For services to Public Transport and to the community in Devon.
- Juliet Deirdre Jean Westoll. For services to the community in Cumbria.
- Michael Wharton, Senior Executive Officer, Pension, Disability and Carers' Service, Department for Work and Pensions.
- Jean Veta White, Founder Member, Leeds Race Equality Council. For services to Community Relations.
- John Harry White. For voluntary service to the Prison Service Charity Fund.
- Paul White. For voluntary service to Hastings Coastguard Rescue Team, East Sussex.
- Graham Whitehurst, Plant Manager, Michelin Ballymena. For services to Business.
- Brenda Whitmore, Deputy Head, Hillfields Children's Centre, Coventry. For services to Children and Families.
- Amy Williams, British Skeleton Racer. For services to Sport.
- Bert Frederick Williams. For services to Football and to Charity.
- David Glyn Williams. For services to the community in Calverley, West Yorkshire.
- Councillor Hazel Williams. For services to the community in East Cambridgeshire.
- Barbara Ann Wilson, International Trade Adviser. For services to Export.
- Stuart Wilson, Firefighter, West Yorkshire Fire and Rescue Service. For services to Local Government.
- Paul Winter, Business Design Expert, Modernising Pay As You Earn Processes for Customers, Sunderland, HM Revenue and Customs.
- Aileen Teresa Wiswell. For services to the community in Warrington, Cheshire.
- James Witham, Porter and Driver, Harrogate Health Care NHS Foundation Trust. For services to the NHS.
- Josephine Mary Sykes-Wood, JP. For services to the Prevention of Domestic Abuse in Merseyside.
- Brenda Jean Woodings. For services to Local Government in Duffield, Derbyshire.
- Professor Peter Alfred Woodsford. For services to the Geographic Information Industry.
- Cora Woolcock. For services to Healthcare for Black and Minority Ethnic People in East London.
- Maxine Worsfold, Acting Sergeant, City of London Police. For services to the Police.
- Dorothy Joan Wren. For services to the community in North London.
- Kay Denise Wright. For services to Black and Minority Ethnic People in Northern Ireland.
- Margaret Wright, Team Leader, Debt Management and Banking, Shipley, HM Revenue and Customs.
- Neill Wright. For voluntary service to the Samaritans in Macclesfield, Cheshire.
- Vivienne Linda Yandell. For services to Business and to Charity in Saltash, Cornwall.
- Christine, Lady Yapp, JP. For services to the community in Birmingham.
- Alison Yearley, Personal Secretary, Department for Culture, Media and Sport.
- Margaret June Young. For services to Older People in Burnley, Lancashire.

Honorary appointment to be made Substantive

- Dr. Kranti Rajesh Hiremath, MBE. (To be dated 25 March 2010).

Diplomatic Service and Overseas List

- Judith Helen Claire Acheson, Youth Training Consultant. For services to young people in the Democratic Republic of Congo.
- Richard James Aspin, Communications and Projects Officer, Governor's Office, Montserrat.
- Graham John Bell, Group Scout Leader, 1st Bougival Scout Group. For services to UK Scouting and the British community in France.
- Patrick Herbert Bimson. For services to British interests in Uruguay.
- Michael Anthony Bindloss Boddington, Founder, COPE (Co-operative Orthotic and Prosthetic Enterprise). For services to the victims of unexploded ordnance in Laos.
- Dorothy Guyver, Lady Bouchier, Author and Translator. For services to UK/Japanese cultural relations.
- Dr. Peter Brian Ramsay Carey, Co-Founder, Cambodia Trust. For services to the rehabilitation of the disabled in South East Asia.
- Joseph Louis Caruana, Voluntary social worker. For services to drug rehabilitation in Gibraltar.
- Simon Chapman, First Secretary, Foreign and Commonwealth Office.
- Derek Cheung Yu Keung, Manager, Commonwealth War Graves Commission, Hong Kong. For services to the War Cemeteries in Hong Kong.
- Gary Clement. Chairman, South Atlantic Medal Association, Falkland Islands. For services to Military Veterans in the Falkland Islands.
- Angela Louise Crompton, Attaché, British Consulate-General, Jerusalem.
- Alison Devine, British Council Deputy Director United Arab Emirates and Director, Dubai.
- Sharon Diaz (Miss Sharon Gordon), Second Secretary, Foreign and Commonwealth Office.
- Clare Bat Dimyon. For services to promoting the rights of lesbian, gay, bisexual and transgender people in Central and Eastern Europe.
- Irene Mary Ellis, Founder President, Javea Cancer Care Centre. For services to Cancer sufferers and their families and friends in Alicante, Spain.
- Gerard Leo Flynn, Headteacher, Maadi British International School, Egypt. For services to education and charitable activities in Egypt.
- Benjamin John Freeth. For services to the farming community in Zimbabwe.
- Conrad Jack Glass. For services to the community in Tristan da Cunha.
- Andrew John Goodwin, lately First Secretary, Office of the United Kingdom Permanent Representative to the EU, Brussels, Belgium.
- Robert Henry Hawkins, British Honorary Consul, Penang. For services to the British community in Malaysia.
- Kevin Howard, Chairman, British American Business Council, Houston. For services to British business interests and charitable activities in Houston, USA.
- Michelle Dawn Hughes, Second Secretary, Foreign and Commonwealth Office.
- Stuart Iain Hurst, Second Secretary, Foreign and Commonwealth Office.
- Dr. Alison Sarah Landon, Hospice of Hope in Brasov, Casa Sperantei. For services to palliative care in Romania.
- Ann McCue, Founder Director, Yayasan Harapan Sumba. For services to the Sumbanese community in Indonesia.
- Paul McEvoy, General Manager, Lloyds TSB Ecuador. For services to the British community in Ecuador.
- Shona McKay McGrahan, Director, Action for Russia's Children. For services to disadvantaged children in Russia.
- Lynne Alison McGregor, Visits and Political Officer, British Embassy, Italy.
- Alden McNee McLaughlin Jr., JP, Member of the Legislative Assembly, Cayman Islands. For services to constitutional reform.
- Andrew Mead. For philanthropic activities in Saudi Arabia.
- Victor Harry Moon, BEM, lately Security Project Manager, British Embassy, Kabul, Afghanistan.
- Richard Hugh Morton, Tri-Service Financial Administrator, British High Commission, Australia. For services to British interests and to Volunteer Firefighting in Australia.
- Julia Helen Moss. For services to classical music in Kenya.
- Richard William Moss, For services to classical music in Kenya.
- Caroline Mulcahy, Second Secretary, Provincial Reconstruction Team, Helmand, Afghanistan.
- Donald Eric Peters. For services to the Overseas Territories.
- Ulric Scatliffe, Chief Scouting Commissioner, Scout Movement. For services to the community in the British Virgin Islands.
- Linda Jane Stevens, Second Secretary, Foreign and Commonwealth Office.
- David George Taylor, Executive Principal, International School in Brunei. For services to environmental education in South East Asia.
- Paul Taylor, Chairman, Blantyre Branch of the Wildlife and Environmental Society of Malawi. For services to wildlife and environmental conservation in Malawi.
- Susan Lesley Whistler, lately Chair, British Women's Association, Jakarta. For services to the British community in Indonesia.
- David Keith Young, Conductor, Dublin Welsh Male Choir. For services to Welsh Music and Culture overseas.
- Calvert Alfred Zuill, Program Director, Bermuda Broadcasting Radio Station. For services to the community in Bermuda.

=== Queen's Police Medal (QPM) ===
England and Wales

- David Andrew Crompton, Deputy Chief Constable, West Yorkshire Police.
- John Patrick Donlon, lately Assistant Chief Constable, Thames Valley Police.
- Phillip Ernest John Harper, Superintendent, Derbyshire Police.
- David Holmes, Detective Inspector, Kent Police.
- Jane Elizabeth Horwood, Chief Superintendent, West Mercia Police.
- Lesley Anne Ingram, Detective Constable, Hertfordshire Police.
- David Marshall, Detective Chief Inspector, Metropolitan Police Service.
- John Patrick Edward McDowall, lately Deputy Assistant Commissioner, Metropolitan Police Service.
- John McLuskie McFadzean, Sergeant, West Yorkshire Police.
- Liam Joseph O'Brien, Detective Chief Superintendent, West Midlands Police.
- Mark Andrew Polin, Chief Constable, North Wales Police.
- Robert Pritchard, Constable, Merseyside Police.
- Christopher Sims, Chief Constable, West Midlands Police.
- Ian Wynford Thomas, QGM, Chief Superintendent, Metropolitan Police Service.
- Mark Toland, Chief Superintendent, Metropolitan Police Service.
- Philip Scott Trendall, Superintendent, British Transport Police.
- Shirley Ann Tulloch, Superintendent, Metropolitan Police Service.
- Christopher James Ware, Superintendent, Avon and Somerset Constabulary.

Scotland

- Frank Buchan, lately Special Constable, Tayside Police.
- Allan Lindsay Burnett, lately Assistant Chief Constable, Fife Constabulary.

Northern Ireland

- Esmond Charles Adair, Detective Superintendent, Police Service of Northern Ireland.
- Deborah McMaster, Acting Detective Chief Inspector, Police Service of Northern Ireland.
- Derek Williamson, Detective Chief Superintendent, Police Service of Northern Ireland.

=== Queen's Fire Services Medal (QFSM) ===
England and Wales

- John Brown, Assistant Chief Fire Officer of the Technical and Operational Support Department, West Midlands Fire and Rescue Service.
- Neil Gibbins, Deputy Chief Fire Officer, Devon and Somerset Fire and Rescue Service.
- Sian Griffiths, Station Manager, London Fire Brigade.
- Mark James Yates, Deputy Chief Fire Officer, Hertfordshire Fire and Rescue Service.

Scotland

- James Allardice, Watch Manager, Central Scotland Fire and Rescue Service.
- Allan Brodie, Watch Manager, Central Scotland Fire and Rescue Service.
- Jim Smith, Advisor, Retained Duty System, Strathclyde Fire and Rescue.

=== Queen's Volunteer Reserves Medal (QVRM) ===
- Major Mark Gibson, Royal Marines Reserve, N980377V.
- Warrant Officer Class 2 Andrew Bancroft, The Parachute Regiment, Territorial Army, 24574029.
- Sergeant Sharon Mary Goodall, The Princess of Wales's Royal Regiment, Territorial Army, W1038275.
- Major Keith Charles Greenough, TD, The Royal Logistic Corps, Territorial Army, 535399.
- Brigadier Maurice John Sheen, TD, late The Royal Logistic Corps, Territorial Army, 506613.
- Squadron Leader Derek Morrison (2626701H), Royal Auxiliary Air Force.

=== Colonial Police Medal (CPM) ===
- Hulman Doorly McLaughlin, Deputy Chief Fire Officer, Cayman Islands Fire Service.

== The Bahamas ==
=== Order of Saint Michael and Saint George ===
==== Companion of the Order of St Michael and St George (CMG) ====
- Warren Levarity. For services to politics and the community.
- Monsignor Preston Moss. For services to religion, religious education and the community.

=== Order of the British Empire ===
==== Commander of the Order of the British Empire (CBE) ====
Civil Division

- Alphonso Robert Elliot. For services to business and to the community.

==== Officer of the Order of the British Empire (OBE) ====
Civil Division

- The Reverend Kenris Carey. For services to religion and to the community.
- Bishop Wenith Davis. For services to religion, education and the community.
- William E. (Billy) Lowe. For services to the church and the community.
- The Reverend Vernon Moses. For services to religion and religious education.

==== Member of the Order of the British Empire (MBE) ====
Civil Division

- Marvin Vernon Bethell. For services to business, the Church and to the community.
- Alfred Bismarck Coakley. For services to business and to the community.
- Susan Gail Holwesko Larson. For services to the community and to conservation.
- David Pinder. For services to the community.
- Elaine Ann Pinder. For services to business, the Church and to the community.
- Susan Roberts. For services to the Cancer Society of The Bahamas.
- The Reverend Ralph Russell. For services to business and to religion.

=== British Empire Medal (BEM) ===
Civil Division

- Cleomie Hilda Antonio. For services to the community and to the Church.
- Betty Brenda Archer. For services to the Church and to the community.
- James Wilfred Dean. For services to business and to the community.
- Claretta M. Duncombe. For services to nursing, the community and to the advancement of woman.
- Arlene Nash Ferguson. For services to education.
- Emmett Munroe. For services as the Mailboat Captain, and to business.
- Olivia Turnquest. For services to education and to the community.
- The Reverend Dr. John C. Wallace, JP. For services to religion and to the community.
- Erma W. Williams. For services to the community.

=== Queen's Police Medal (QPM) ===
- Deputy Commissioner Marvin Dames. For services to the Royal Bahamas Police Force.
- Senior Assistant Commissioner Quinn McCartney. For services to the Royal Bahamas Police Force.

== Grenada ==
=== Order of the British Empire ===
==== Commander of the Order of the British Empire (CBE) ====
Civil Division

- Professor Kathleen Coard. For services to medicine and to the community.

==== Officer of the Order of the British Empire (OBE) ====
Civil Division

- Paul J. V. Slinger. For services to business and to the community.

=== British Empire Medal (BEM) ===
Civil Division

- Lloyd Bubb. For public service.
- Lordnell Bubb. For public service.
- Ken Licorish. For services to agriculture.

== Papua New Guinea ==
=== Knight Bachelor ===
- Bernard Paul Songo, CMG, OBE. For public service as Departmental Head, Diplomatic Representative, and more recently as a leader in public sector reform and management.
- Mahuru Dadi Toka, MBE. For service to the Motu Koita community, the city of Port Moresby, and for his significant contribution to sport, particularly Rugby League.

=== Order of Saint Michael and Saint George ===
==== Companion of the Order of St Michael and St George (CMG) ====
- The Honourable Jeffrey Nape, MP. For service to the community and politics in his capacity as a Member for Sinasina-Yonggamugl, and Speaker of the National Parliament.

=== Order of the British Empire ===
==== Knight Commander of the Order of the British Empire (KBE) ====
Civil Division

- The Right Reverend Samson Lowa. For services to education, the community and the United Church as the Bishop and Moderator of the Church in Papua New Guinea.

==== Commander of the Order of the British Empire (CBE) ====
Civil Division

- John Jeffery. For services to manufacturing and to the wider community, including as President of the Employers' Federation and Chairman of NASFUND.
- Dr. John Edwin Moxon. For services to agriculture and to the National Agricultural Research Institute in particular.
- Dr. Timothy Pyakalya. For services to public health policy and administration.
- Dr. Philip Yembi Siaguru, MBE. For services to forestry and education, particularly as Vice Chancellor of the University of Vudal.

==== Officer of the Order of the British Empire (OBE) ====
Military Division

- 87104 Colonel Jethro Tokam Kanene. For distinguished service to the Papua New Guinea Defence Force.

Civil Division

- George Arua. For services to education and to the National Training Council.
- Mark Edward Bennett. For services to commerce and agriculture and to the community through supporting the campaign to reduce the spread of HIV AIDS.
- Boio Bess Daro. For services to education, particularly in early training and childcare.
- Damien Dominic Gamiandu. For services to the Diplomatic Service of Papua New Guinea.
- The Reverend Father Paul Bernard Jennings, MSC. For services to the Catholic Church and to education in the Milne Bay Province.
- Bill Sharp Kua, MBE. For public service in senior management positions, including leadership in the public sector reform.
- Iammo Gapi Launa, MBE, BEM. For public service and services to the community as a sport competitor and administrator.
- Glen Raymond Murphy. For services to commerce in the tourism and hospitality sector.
- The Reverend Ranyeta Kalyakail Nepo. For services to the community and to the Gutnius Lutheran Church.
- Tony Paliak. For services to East Sepik Provincial Government and to the Wosera community.
- Sister Annette Parker. For services to the Catholic Church and to education, particularly the training of women.
- Ivan Pomaleu. For public service in the National Planning Office and the Investment Promotion Authority.
- Theresa Williams. For public service in the Papua New Guinea High Commission in Australia.

==== Member of the Order of the British Empire (MBE) ====
Military Division

- 87228 Commander Thomas Raivet. For loyal service to the Papua New Guinea Defence Force.
- 812486 Major Aloxcy Angela Manjor. For loyal service to the Papua New Guinea Defence Force.
- 88649 Lieutenant Colonel Otto Pandum. For loyal service to the Papua New Guinea Defence Force.

Civil Division

- Francis Bandi. For services to public health and to football.
- Nerrie Birao. For services to education.
- Lawrence Baptist D'Cruz. For services to Papua New Guinea's Diplomatic Mission to Australia.
- Gabriel Endiken. For services to education and to the community.
- Simon Kauba. For services to the Royal Papua New Guinea Constabulary.
- Douglas James Kelson, MES. For services to business and to the Ambulance Service.
- Pup Laki. For services to healthcare, business and the community.
- Joab W. Mangae. For services to the Royal Papua New Guinea Constabulary.
- Emmanuel Nars Maso. For service to healthcare and to the Hela community.
- Edward Cleland Matane. For service to air transport and to Air Niugini.
- Ruby Mirinka. For services to health education and administration.
- Peter John Neville. For services to business and to the community of Milne Bay Province.
- Ian Ini Onaga. For services to agriculture and livestock.
- Thomas Kutakari Pulao. For services to education and to the community.
- Brother Thomas Andrew Simpson. For services to education and to Rugby League.
- Joshua Sipo. For services to agriculture and to the Anglican Church.
- Samuel Aigeri Tauno. For services to the Anglican Church and to the community.
- Opa Hobart Taureka. For public service and services to local government.
- Maria Tokala. For services to education and to development for women.
- Francis Nekemki Tokura, QPM. For services to the Royal Papua New Guinea Constabulary.
- The Reverend Joseph Sifihuia Walters. For services to the community and to the Assemblies of God Church.
- Elizabeth Wells. For services to sport, particularly swimming.
- The Reverend Yunumi Yungi. For services to the community and to the Papua New Guinea Bible Church.

=== Companion of the Imperial Service Order (ISO) ===
- Taria Keleilagi. For public service.
- Mildred Rave. For public service.

=== British Empire Medal (BEM) ===
Military Division

- 87661 Chief Warrant Officer George Ando. For service to the Papua New Guinea Defence Force.
- 89982 Chief Warrant Officer Steven Avel. For service to the Papua New Guinea Defence Force.
- 88771 Chief Warrant Officer Steven Jacob. For service to the Papua New Guinea Defence Force.
- 88241 Sergeant Newa Sokam. For service to the Papua New Guinea Defence Force.
- 88438 Warrant Officer Edward Susuve. For service to the Papua New Guinea Defence Force.

Civil Division

- Norbet Nou A'O. For services to agriculture extension services.
- Aron Namatu Aima. For services to the community.
- Nora Changei. For services to nursing.
- Bob Coleman. For services to the community and to charities.
- Michael Eakali. For services to healthcare.
- Dianne Gideon. For public service.
- Konio Havea. For services to education.
- Tau Helai. For services to the National Judicial Staff Services.
- Charles Hitolo. For services to the community and to the United Church.
- Levi Kaila. For public service.
- Nako Kating. For services to agriculture and livestock.
- William Kenwai. For services to public works in the Simbu province.
- William Liam. For services to education.
- Alphonse Jambik Magim. For public service, and services to football.
- Benny Makuai. For services to rural healthcare.
- Pius Mataio. For services to the Catholic Church and to the community.
- Fidelis Minei. For services to education and to the community.
- Rimbe Molang. For services to the Correctional Service.
- Lua Oru. For services to the community.
- Mathew Umin Oruki. For services to healthcare.
- Francis Pius. For services to the Correctional Service.
- Ngunts Poko. For services to the Police Force and to the community.
- Wairu Salee. For public service.
- The Reverend Aimos Sarikisik. For services to the Assemblies of God Church.
- Maino Bami Sorekicne. For services to the Morobe Provincial Government.
- Rami Ekai Tende. For services to the community and to religion.
- Mary Tigil. For services to the Police Force and to Government House.
- Rop Timbai. For services to the community.
- The Reverend Mumure Topoqogo. For services to Garasa Bible School.
- Jill R. Tulo. For services to the Correctional Service.
- Samoa Waea. For services to sport, particularly netball and lawn bowls.
- Alua Wakia. For services to the community.
- Brigitte Wangi. For services to nursing and healthcare.
- Kepikiye Waringi. For services to village court and to the community.
- Joe Wija. For public service.
- Betty Wilson. For services to the Police Force and to Government House.

=== Queen's Police Medal (QPM) ===
- Superintendent Anthon Billie, Papua New Guinea Constabulary.
- Chief Superintendent Mark Kanawi, BEM, DPS, Papua New Guinea Constabulary.

== Solomon Islands ==
=== Order of the British Empire ===
==== Knight Commander of the Order of the British Empire (KBE) ====
Civil Division

- Dr. Trevor Garland. For services to the development of Solomon Islands.

==== Commander of the Order of the British Empire (CBE) ====
Civil Division

- John Maetia Kaluae, OBE. For services to the community, education and political development.

==== Officer of the Order of the British Empire (OBE) ====
Civil Division

- David Maelaua. For services to Government and to the community.
- Pastor Chief Joseph Faneta Sira. For services to the Church, community and politics.
- Austin Kwong Chee Yam. For services to commerce, business and the community.

==== Member of the Order of the British Empire (MBE) ====
Civil Division

- Adrienne Fomani. For services to the Royal Solomon Islands Police Force.
- Clive Talo. For services to the Royal Solomon Islands Police Force.
- George Tataio. For services to the community and to Government.
- Peter Tori. For Services to the Royal Solomon Islands Police Force.

=== Queen's Police Medal (QPM) ===
- Festus Ganiomea. For services to the Royal Solomon Islands Police Force in Community Policing.
- Cecilia Joanna Kabwere. For services to the Royal Solomon Islands Police Force.

== Tuvalu ==
=== Order of the British Empire ===
==== Officer of the Order of the British Empire (OBE) ====
Civil Division

- Tavau Teii. For services to politics.

==== Member of the Order of the British Empire (MBE) ====
Civil Division

- Pakai K. Asaia. For services to the public and to the community.
- Lagi Etoma. For services to the public and to the community.
- Leata Telavi. For services to the public and to the community.

=== British Empire Medal (BEM) ===
Civil Division

- Eti Esela. For services to the public and to the community.
- Amatage Luka. For services to the public and to the community.
- Tonuu Taani. For services to the public and to the community.

== Saint Lucia ==
=== Order of Saint Michael and Saint George ===
==== Companion of the Order of St Michael and St George (CMG) ====
- Michael Thomas Chastanet. For National Development and for services to business.

=== Order of the British Empire ===
==== Officer of the Order of the British Empire (OBE) ====
Civil Division

- Cornelius Lincoln Lubin, MBE. For public service.
- Tyrone George Maynard. For services to industrial relations and to business.

==== Member of the Order of the British Empire (MBE) ====
Civil Division

- Everton Clarinton Ambrose. For services to agriculture.
- Alban Ryan Lanfranc Antoine. For services to education.
- George Ambrose Paul Dolcy. For services to education, agriculture and the community.
- Hubert Anderson King. For services to education and to the community.

=== British Empire Medal (BEM) ===
Civil Division

- Priscillia Dawn Augustin. For services to community nursing.
- Ernest Philip Ceromain. For services to manufacturing and to the community.
- Felix Howell. For services to the transportation sector and to the community.
- Camille Joseph. For services to teaching and to the community.

== Saint Vincent and the Grenadines ==
=== Order of Saint Michael and Saint George ===
==== Companion of the Order of St Michael and St George (CMG) ====
- The Right Reverend Bishop Calvert Leopold Friday. For services to religion and to the community.

=== Order of the British Empire ===
==== Dame Commander of the Order of the British Empire (DBE) ====
Civil Division

- Monica Jessie Dacon, CMG. For services to education, the community and the Office of the Deputy Governor-General.

==== Officer of the Order of the British Empire (OBE) ====
Civil Division

- Kenneth Allison Browne. For services to politics, business and the community.
- Susan Dilys Dougan. For services to education and to public administration.

==== Member of the Order of the British Empire (MBE) ====
Civil Division

- Cosmus Emmanuel Cozier. For services to public administration, the Foreign Service and the community.
- Errol Fitz-Stephen Davis. For services to agriculture, business and the community.

== Antigua and Barbuda ==
=== Order of Saint Michael and Saint George ===
==== Companion of the Order of St Michael and St George (CMG) ====
- Sydney P. Christian, QC. For public service.

=== Order of the British Empire ===
==== Officer of the Order of the British Empire (OBE) ====
Civil Division

- The Venerable Peter A. Daley, Archdeacon of Antigua. For services to the Church.
