= Stephen Chan =

Stephen or Steve Chan may refer to:

- Stephen Chan (academic) (born 1949), New Zealand author and professor of politics
- Stephen Chan Chi-wan (born 1958), Hong Kong radio and television executive
- Stephen Chan Chit-kwai (born 1949), Hong Kong politician
- Steve Chan (Taiwanese politician) (born 1948), Taiwanese physician and politician
- Steve Chan (American politician), in Brooklyn, New York
