= Simon Robertson =

British businessman (born 1941)

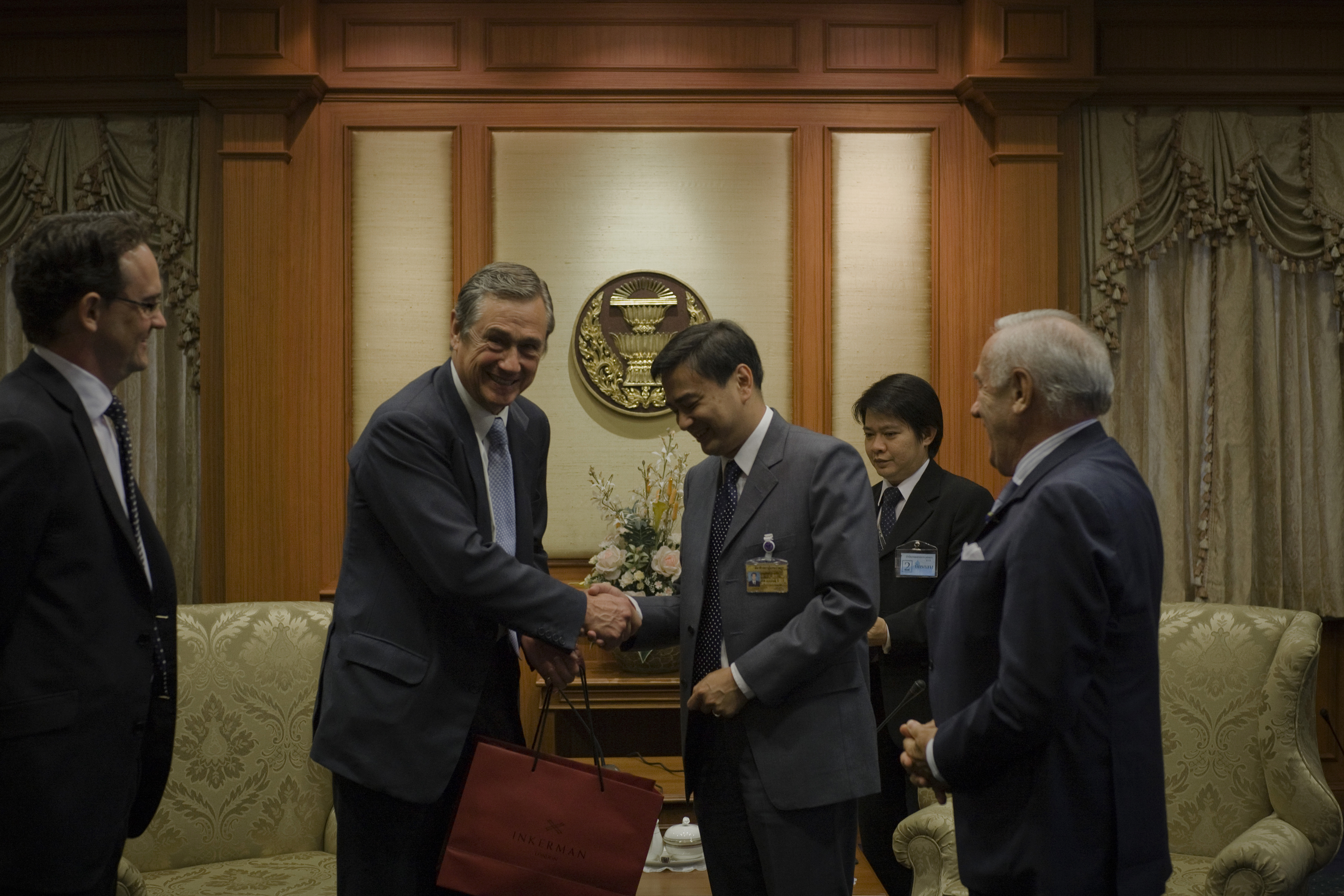
Sir Simon Robertson (left) and Thai Prime Minister Abhisit Vejjajiva (right).

Sir Simon Manwaring Robertson (born 4 March 1941), is a British banker and businessman.

== Biography ==
Simon Robertson attended Eton College.

He worked for Kleinwort Benson for 34 years, where he eventually served as chairman of the board. He left the company in 1997. He then worked for Goldman Sachs, where he served as President of Goldman Sachs Europe. In 2004, he was appointed to the Board of Directors of Rolls-Royce, and he became chairman in January 2005. He also serves on the Boards of Directors of HSBC Holdings, Berry Brothers and Rudd, and The Economist. He has served on the Boards of the London Stock Exchange, Invensys, and Inchcape. He runs Simon Robertson Associates. He is a member of the 30% Club, a group of FTSE-100 Chairmen committed to having at least 30% of their Boardmembers being female.

He sits on the board of directors of the Royal Opera House, and on the board of trustees of the Eden Project. He is a member of White's. He was knighted in 2010. He is a member of the Conservative Party Foundation. He is reportedly worth £95 million.

Robertson was knighted in the 2010 Birthday Honours for "services to business".
