= Alec Coles =

Alec Coles OBE FRSA
- Born: 3 January 1959 (age 67)
- Education: University of Leicester (BSc); Newcastle University; University of East Anglia
- Employer: Western Australian Museum
- Coles' voice recorded September 2018

Alec Coles OBE FRSA (born 3 January 1959) has been CEO of Western Australian Museum since March 2010.

He was educated at the University of Leicester (BSc), Newcastle University and the University of East Anglia. He was previously Chief Executive of the Northumberland Wildlife Trust and Director of Tyne & Wear Archives & Museums.

Coles is a Fellow of the Royal Society of Arts (FRSA), and was appointed an Officer of the Order of the British Empire (OBE) in the 2010 Birthday Honours, "for services to museums".

He was awarded an honorary degree: Doctor of Letters (D.Litt.) by the University of Western Australia in 2017.

In 2021, Coles was named Western Australian of the Year in the Arts and Culture category of the Celebrate WA 'WA Day' Awards.
