= Barbara Monroe =

British social worker and hospital chief executive

Professor Dame Barbara Monroe DBE, FRSA
- Born: 1951 (age 74–75)
- Employer: St Christopher's Hospice (1987–2014)

Dame Barbara Monroe, DBE, FRSA (born 1951) is a British social worker and hospital chief executive.

== Biography ==
She began working at St Christopher's Hospice in 1987, rising to the position of Chief Executive in 2000 and retiring in 2014.

Monroe served as chair of the United Kingdom's national Childhood Bereavement Network for eight years.

She is an Honorary Professor at Lancaster University's International Observatory on End of Life Care, and is an Honorary Senior Lecturer at the University of Auckland.

Monroe was made a Dame Commander of the Order of the British Empire (DBE) in the 2010 Birthday Honours. She is also a Fellow of the Royal Society of Arts (FRSA).
