= Rigby Graham =

English landscape and topographical artist

- Born: 1931
- Died: 7 May 2015 (aged 83–84)
- Alma mater: De Montfort University
- Occupation: Painter, typesetter, graphic artist, illustrator, educator
- Awards: Member of the Order of the British Empire

Rigby Graham MBE (2 February 1931 – 7 May 2015) was an English landscape and topographical artist who worked within the English Romanticism tradition but in his choice of colours owed a debt to German Expressionism. He also worked in further and higher education.

== Life and career ==
Graham was born in Manchester and trained as a mural painter at the Leicester College of Art. After teaching at a number of local schools, Graham returned to lecture at the College of Art, firstly in graphic design and printing, then in education and latterly in bookbinding. Graham illustrated more than 250 books and pamphlets and wrote extensively on art and artists. Graham retired from teaching in 1983.

He was instrumental in the establishment of Leicester Polytechnic (now De Montfort University) and worked there as a lecturer and as a course administrator.

He was appointed a Member of the Order of the British Empire (MBE) in the 2010 Birthday Honours, "For services to the Arts".

He died on 7 May 2015.

Many of Graham's murals are lost through overpainting or building demolition. His 1959 work in oil, 'Newborn', was acquired in 2021 by Leicester City Council and is now in the collection of Leicester Museum & Art Gallery, which also holds several of his other works.

His archives are at Manchester Metropolitan University.

== Writings and works ==
- Graham's Leicestershire, 1980
- Holt Mill Papers Peter and Donna Thomas, Santa Cruz, 1994
- Kippers and Sawdust The Old Style Press, Landogo, 1992 B00157WQ7M
- Romantic Book Illustration in England 1943-55 Private Libraries Assn 1965 B0000CH197
- John Minton 1917-57, A Selective Retrospective Oriel 31, 1993 ISBN 9781870797139
