= Barry Albin-Dyer =

British funeral director

Barry Albin-Dyer at work

Barry George Albin-Dyer OBE (2 February 1951 – 6 June 2015) was an undertaker whose firm F.A. Albin and Sons were known for their work repatriating the bodies of servicemen killed in Iraq and Afghanistan. The firm also arranged many high-profile funerals, including actor Donald Pleasence and television personality Jade Goody.

Albin-Dyer was born Barry George Dyer in London. His father was an undertaker. He took over the firm Albin and Sons in 1986, and subsequently changed his own surname to Albin-Dyer. He resisted lucrative offers from large funeral companies who wanted to buy F.A.Albin and Sons, preferring to remain independent. He was a well-known figure in the Bermondsey area of London, where the firm were based, and in connection with his military work at Royal Wootton Bassett and Brize Norton.

In mid-2003, F.A. Albin and Sons and its staff alongside Albin-Dyer, were featured in an ITV television series titled Don't Drop the Coffin, which followed the daily working lives of its staff from late 2002 to early 2003. It was also one of the most talked-about programmes of the year. The title is inspired, by the first piece of advice Albin-Dyer's father gave him when he started out in the undertaker's business. The series was inspired by a book of the same name Albin-Dyer previously released, with ITV later repackaging the book with additional material on the making of the series.

Albin-Dyer was appointed an Officer of the Order of the British Empire (OBE) in the 2010 Birthday Honours.

He died from brain cancer on 6 June 2015, aged 64. He was a Roman Catholic convert. In tribute, Digital television channel London Live repeated Don't Drop the Coffin in full, having already repeated the series in January of that year.

== Memoirs ==
- Don't Drop the Coffin! with Greg Watts Hodder & Stoughton, London, 2002. ISBN 0340786647
- Bury My Heart in Bermondsey. Hodder & Stoughton, London, 2004. ISBN 0340862912
- Strong Shoulders. Hodder & Stoughton, London, 2005. ISBN 0340862963

"Final Departures", Hodder & Stoughton, London, 2005. ISBN 978-0340908532 "Square Pegs in Round Holes" with Greg Watts, Strong Shoulder Publications, London, 2013. ISBN 9780956915405
