= Bourne Community College =

The Bourne Community College
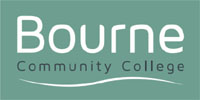

Location
- Park Road; Southbourne, West Sussex, PO10 8PJ; England
- 50.851°N 0.9146°W

Information
- Type: Foundation school
- Local authority: West Sussex County Council
- Trust: Bourne Community Trust
- Department for Education URN: 126069 Tables
- Ofsted: Reports
- Staff: Mrs Aparna Sharma (Headteacher)
- Gender: Coeducational
- Age: 11 to 16
- Enrolment: 850
- Colour: Navy Blue
- Website: http://www.bourne.org.uk/

Bourne Community College is a coeducational secondary school located in Southbourne, West Sussex, England.
