= Geoff Holt (sailor) =

British sailor (born 1966)

- Born: 24 February 1966 (age 59); Portsmouth, Hampshire, England
- Known for: The first solo circumnavigation of Britain by a quadriplegic yachtsman and his activisms for equality of those with physical disabilities.
- Spouse: Elaine Holt
- Children: Tim Holt
- Website: www.geoffholt.com

Geoffrey Trevor Marden Holt MBE, DL (born 24 February 1966) is an English sailor from Portsmouth, Hampshire. Paralysed in an accident at the age of eighteen, in 2007, he became the first quadriplegic yachtsman to sail solo around Great Britain.

In September 2007, Holt completed his 1,500-mile (2,414 km) sail around the UK in his 15-foot (4.6 m) trimaran dinghy Freethinker, becoming the first severely disabled person to make the journey. In December 2007, he was named BBC South Sports Personality of the Year.

In 2008, Holt wrote his autobiography Walking on Water.

In December 2009, he set out to cross the Atlantic Ocean on his yacht the Impossible Dream, aiming to become the first quadriplegic to do so. He succeeded in the 2,700-mile (4,345 km) crossing, arriving on 7 January 2010.

Holt was appointed Member of the Order of the British Empire (MBE) in the 2010 Birthday Honours.

Holt also won the title of Yachting Journalist Association (YJA) Pantaenius Yachtsman of the Year for 2010. Of this award, he said: "For me this is the knighthood of sailing".

In 2012, Holt was made a Deputy Lieutenant of Hampshire.

In 2024, Holt completed a second circumnavigation of the United Kingdom, this time in a powerboat from his Wetwheels charity as part of an ongoing campaign called finishing the dream to raise the funds for four more disabled accessible powerboats to help ensure every disabled person has a barrier-free access to the water as part of the Wetwheels foundation.
