= Early Years – the organisation for young children =

- Formation: 1965
- Legal status: Non-Profit making organisation
- Headquarters: Belfast, Northern Ireland
- Location: Northern Ireland
- Region served: Northern Ireland, Republic of Ireland and international
- Members: 1,147 (approx.)
- Chief Executive: Siobhan Fitzpatrick
- Staff: 250
- Website: http://www.early-years.org/

Early Years – the organisation for young children is a non-profit organisation based in Belfast, Northern Ireland. Formerly known as Nippa, it works to promote education and care services for young children. It provides support in the form of information and training to parents, childcare providers, employers and local authorities, as well as the development of programmes and projects to enhance the care and education provided for children.

== History ==
Early Years was founded in 1965, when an inaugural meeting was held, attended by 25 people. The organisation was formed as NIPPA and established as part of PPA, the English Pre-School Playgroup Association. A year later, the first AGM and conference were held, offering members within the organisation the opportunity to meet and review the working year of the company in addition to participating in training activities. This event still continues on an annual basis.

Early Years continued to grow and in the year 2007 the name NIPPA was changed to Early Years – the organisation for young children to reflect the range of services being provided.

== Organisation ==
Siobhan Fitzpatrick is the first, and current, Chief Executive Officer for Early Years, and has held this responsibility since 1989. The Deputy CEO is Pauline Walmsley.

Early Years continue to promote high quality childcare and pre-school education for children in Northern Ireland, the Republic of Ireland and internationally.

== Current work ==
Early Years offers a range of programmes and services for playgroup and daycare staff, parents and those working with children to promote care and education in addition to addressing issues of social exclusion and respect for differences.

Two major projects introduced to promote a culture of respecting difference and inclusion in early years are the ‘Media Initiative for Children - Respecting Difference Programme’ and the Traveller 'Toybox' project. The 'Media Initiative' programme aims to tackle sectarianism, racism, physical discrimination, ethnicity and bullying whereas the 'Toybox' project challenges institutional racism and supports Traveller children and families to access early education.

To ensure and measure the success of programmes and projects implemented, Early Years also launched the 'CORAL Initiative'. This programme provides evidence that the programmes developed and managed by the organisation such as the 'Eager and Able to Learn' programme, improve long term outcomes for young children.

To extend and consolidate their international relationships, the 'International Network on Peace Building with young Children' was launched as a three-year project led by Early Years and supported by the International Centre for Education and Human Development in Colombia.

The International Network project supports innovation in the field of peace building, enables sharing good practice and utilising these practices. The network also aims to develop an advocacy model in supporting the early childhood sector in conflict.

The innovation in terms of providing services and developing projects continue to grow within the organisation with the launch of a new family health initiative for children within pre-school education in partnership with ‘Cooperation And Working Together’ this year.
