= Stewards Academy =

Location
- Parnall Road; Harlow, Essex, CM18 7NQ; England
- Coordinates: 51.7511°N 0.0929°E

Information
- Former name: Stewards School
- Type: Academy
- Motto: Excellence with Integrity; Success with Soul.
- Local authority: Essex County Council
- Trust: Stewards Academy Trust
- Department for Education URN: 137552 Tables
- Ofsted: Reports
- Head teacher: Stephen Drew
- Gender: Mixed
- Age range: 11–16
- Enrolment: 999 (2025)
- Capacity: 1,050
- Houses: Bravery, Fortitude, Valour, Prowess
- Website: www.stewardsacademy.org

Stewards Academy (formerly Stewards Schools) is an 11–16 mixed secondary school with academy status in Harlow, Essex, England.

== History ==
The school converted to academy status in 2011.

In 2014, a former maths teacher at the school was found guilty of sexually assaulting a child.

In September 2016, the school was visited by the Duke and Duchess of Cambridge and the Vice-Lord Lieutenant of Essex, Jonathan Douglas-Hughes, to promote the Heads Together campaign.

In February 2024, an ICT teacher at the school was banned for life from teaching by a Teaching Regulation Agency panel after he was found to have had an "inappropriate" and "sexually motivated" relationship with a pupil at the school.

In May 2024, the academy received a "requires improvement" rating from Ofsted. In response, the academy instituted a policy of punishing pupils who didn't score highly enough on tests and homework. The policy was criticised by parents at the school after an incident where a Year 7 student received a detention for scoring less than 90%.
