= Judith Darmady =

British paediatrician

Judith Mary Darmady, OBE (28 September 1935 – 13 April 2020) was a British paediatrician.
