= Stephen Chan (academic) =

Professor of international relations

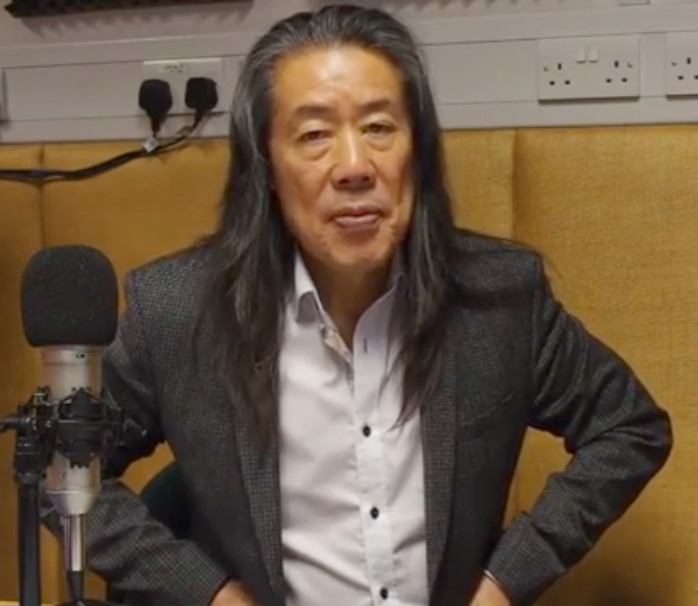
- In a SOAS video in 2016
- Born: 1949 (age 75–76); New Zealand
- Education: University of Auckland; King's College London; University of Kent
- Occupation(s): Academic, writer
- Employer: SOAS University of London

Stephen Chan OBE (born 1949) is an author and Professor of World Politics at SOAS, University of London. He was appointed an OBE for "services to Africa and higher education" in 2010. He has published number of books on international relations and articles and reviews in the academic and specialist press, as well as journalistic feature articles.

== Biography ==
Born to Chinese refugees to New Zealand, Stephen Chan received his Bachelor of Arts and Master of Arts at the University of Auckland. He then did another Master of Arts at King's College London, prior to his PhD at the University of Kent. He began his academic career in Africa at the University of Zambia in 1983, and has subsequently been a visiting lecturer at the University of Wellington and held academic posts at the University of Kent and Nottingham Trent University, before joining SOAS in 2002.

In 2010, he won the International Studies Association prize, Eminent Scholar in Global Development.

== Authored books ==
- Composing Africa: Civil Society and its Discontents. Tampere Peace Research Institute. 2002. ISBN 9789517061995.
- Robert Mugabe: A Life of Power and Violence. I.B. Tauris. 2003. ISBN 9781860648731.
- Out of Evil: New International Politics and Old Doctrines of War. London: I.B.Tauris. 2005. ISBN 9781850434207.
- Grasping Africa: A Tale of Achievement and Tragedy. London: I.B. Tauris. 2007. ISBN 9781845112851.
- The End of Certainty: Towards a New Internationalism. London. ZED Books Ltd. 2009. ISBN 9781848136571.
- Citizen of Africa: Conversations with Morgan Tsvangirai. African Books Collective. 2010. ISBN 9781779221056.
- Chan, Stephen (2017). Plural International Relations in a Divided World. ISBN 9781509508679.
- Why Mugabe Won: The 2013 Elections in Zimbabwe and Their Aftermath. Cambridge University Press. 2017. ISBN 9781107117167.
- African Political Thought: An Intellectual History of the Quest for Freedom. Hurst & Company. 2021. ISBN 9781787385504.
