= 1993 New Year Honours =

British royal recognitions

The New Year Honours 1993 were appointments by most of the 16 Commonwealth realms of Queen Elizabeth II to various orders and honours to reward and highlight good works by citizens of those countries, and honorary ones to citizens of other countries. They were announced on 30 December 1992 to celebrate the year passed and mark the beginning of 1993 in the United Kingdom, New Zealand, the Bahamas, Grenada, the Solomon Islands, Tuvalu, Saint Vincent and the Grenadines, and Belize.

The recipients of honours are displayed here as they were styled before their new honour, and arranged by honour, with classes (Knight, Knight Grand Cross, etc.) and then divisions (Military, Civil, etc.) as appropriate.

== United Kingdom ==
=== Life Peer ===
Baroness

- The Right Honourable Shirley Vivien Teresa Brittain Williams. Founder member and former President of the Social Democrat Party.

=== Privy Counsellor ===
- Baroness Emily May Blatch, CBE, Minister of State, Department for Education. For political service.
- Sir Percy Cradock, GCMG, formerly Foreign Policy Advisor to the Prime Minister (1984-1992).
- Sir Peter Frank Hannibal Emery, MP, Member of Parliament for Honiton. For political service.
- Sir Peter Maudslay Hordern, DL, MP, Member of Parliament for Horsham. For political service.
- Sir John Daniel Wheeler, DL, MP, Member of Parliament for Westminster North. For political service.

=== Knight Bachelor ===
- Malcolm Henry Arnold, CBE, Composer.
- Robert George Alexander Balchin, Chairman, Grant Maintained Schools' Foundation.
- Francis Christopher Buchan Bland, Chairman, Hammersmith and Queen Charlotte's Hospitals Special Health Authority.
- John Freeman Chatfield, CBE, lately Chairman, Executive Council, Association of County Councils.
- Robert Cyril Clarke, Chairman, United Biscuits (Holdings) plc. For services to the Food Industry.
- Harry Ari Djanogly, CBE. For charitable services.
- David Paradine Frost, OBE, Broadcaster and Journalist.
- Professor Henry Harris. For contribution to medical research.
- Anthony Philip Hopkins, CBE, Actor.
- Eric Waldo Benjamin Howells, CBE. For political and public service.
- Professor David Hull, Professor of Child Health, University Hospital Nottingham.
- Geoffrey David Inkin, OBE, Chairman, Cardiff Bay Development Corporation. Chairman, Land Authority for Wales. For public service in Wales.
- John Raymond Johnstone, CBE, Chairman, Forestry Commission. For public service in Scotland.
- John Chippendale Lindley Keswick, Chairman, Hambros Bank Limited. For services to Banking.
- Michael Anthony Latham, formerly Member of Parliament for Rutland and Melton. For political service.
- Christopher Lewinton, Chairman and Chief Executive, TI Group plc. For services to the Engineering Industry.
- Alistair John Mackechnie. For political service.
- Peter Mansfield, FRS, Professor of Physics, Magnetic Resonance Centre, University of Nottingham.
- Roger Denis Moate, MP, Member of Parliament for Faversham. For political service.
- Geoffrey John Mulcahy, Chairman and Chief Executive, Kingfisher plc. For services to the Retail Industry.
- Colonel Stuart Richard Newman, CBE, TD. For political service.
- Charles Wilfrid Newton, CBE, Chairman of London Transport and of London Underground Limited.
- Duncan Kirkbride Nichol, CBE, Chief Executive, National Health Service Management Executive.
- Paul Douglas Nicholson. For services to industry and to the public in North East England.
- Professor David Keith Peters, Regius Professor of Physic, University of Cambridge.
- Professor John Cyril Smith, CBE. For services to Academic Law.
- John Alan Thomas, Head of the Defence Export Services Organisation, Ministry of Defence.
- His Honour Judge Lawrence John Verney, TD, DL, The Recorder of London.
- William Whitfield, CBE, Senior Partner, Whitfield & Partners. For services to Architecture.
- Alfred William (Jerry) Wiggin, TD, MP, Member of Parliament for Weston-super-Mare. For political service.

Diplomatic Service and Overseas List

- William Purves, CBE, DSO, JP. For public and commercial services in Hong Kong.

=== Order of the Bath ===
==== Knight Grand Cross of the Order of the Bath (GCB) ====
Military Division

- General Sir David Ramsbotham, KCB, CBE, ADC (Gen.) (427439), late The Royal Green Jackets, Honorary Colonel Cambridge University Officers Training Corps.
- Air Chief Marshal Sir Michael Graydon, KCB, CBE, ADC, Royal Air Force.

==== Knight Commander of the Order of the Bath (KCB) ====
Military Division

- Vice Admiral Geoffrey William Roger Biggs.
- Vice Admiral Michael Henry Gordon Layard, CBE.
- Air Marshal John Frederick Willis, CB, CBE, Royal Air Force.

Civil Division

- Thomas Stuart Legg, CB, QC, Permanent Secretary, Lord Chancellor's Department.

==== Companion of the Order of the Bath (CB) ====
Military Division

Royal Navy

- Rear Admiral Colin Herbert Dickinson Cooke-Priest.
- Surgeon Rear Admiral David Askey Lammiman, LVO, QHS.
- Rear Admiral (John Geoffrey) Robin Musson.

Army

- Major General Richard Edward Barron (471196), late The Queen's Royal Irish Hussars.
- Major General William Andrew Evans (461417), late 5th Royal Inniskilling Dragoon Guards.
- The Reverend James Harkness, OBE, QHC, (468441), Royal Army Chaplains' Department.
- Major General James Frederick Junor Johnston, CBE, (461457), late Corps of Royal Electrical and Mechanical Engineers.
- Major General John Donald MacDonald, CBE, (457210), late Royal Corps of Transport.

Royal Air Force

- Air Vice-Marshal David Rowthorne French, MBE.
- Air Vice-Marshal Peter John Harding, CBE, AFC.
- The Venerable (Air Vice-Marshal) Brian Humphrey Lucas, QHC.

Civil Division

- Trevor Buckley, lately Grade 3, Ministry of Defence.
- Eric Caines, Grade 2, Department of Health.
- Stephen Rex Davie, Grade 3, Cabinet Office.
- Christopher David Daykin, Government Actuary.
- Ian Malcolm Dunbar, Grade 3, Home Office.
- Huw Prideaux Evans, Grade 2, HM Treasury.
- David Charles Thomas Eves, Grade 2, Health and Safety Executive, Department of Employment.
- John Hepworth Holroyd, First Civil Service Commissioner, Office of Public Service and Science.
- Donald William Limon, Clerk Assistant, House of Commons.
- Roger Davis Munrow, lately Chief Master, Chancery Division, Lord Chancellor's Department.
- John Laughlin Semple, Permanent Secretary, Department of Finance and Personnel, Northern Ireland Civil Service.
- Robin John Alfred Sharp, Grade 3, Department of the Environment.
- Jeremy Bernard Surr, lately Grade 3, Department of Employment.
- Euan Ross Sutherland, Parliamentary Counsel.
- Alan Ronald Titchener, Grade 3, Department of Trade and Industry.
- William Alastair Paterson Weatherston, Grade 3, Scottish Office.
- Irving Yass, Grade 3, Department of Transport.

=== Order of Saint Michael and Saint George ===
==== Knight Grand Cross of the Order of St Michael and St George (GCMG) ====
- Sir Ewen Alastair John Fergusson, GCVO, KCMG, HM Ambassador, Paris.

==== Knight Commander of the Order of St Michael and St George (KCMG) ====
- The Right Honourable Cranley Gordon Douglas Onslow, MP, Member of Parliament for Woking. For political service.
- John Anthony Adye, Director, Government Communications Headquarters.
- Nigel Hugh Robert Allen Broomfield, CMG, HM Ambassador-designate, Bonn.
- Michael John Newington, CMG, lately HM Ambassador, Brasilia.

==== Companion of the Order of St Michael and St George (CMG) ====
- Roger Campbell Beetham, LVO, HM Ambassador, Dakar.
- David Allan Burns, Head of the British Mission to Cambodia, Phnom Penh.
- Charles John Carey, lately a Member of the European Court of Auditors, Brussels.
- Ian Pender Chalmers, OBE, Foreign and Commonwealth Office.
- Arthur Leycester Scott Coltman, HM Ambassador, Havana.
- Richard Nigel Dales, British High Commissioner, Harare.
- John Robert de Fonblanque, Counsellor, Office of the United Kingdom Permanent Representative to the European Commission, Brussels.
- Martin Roger Eaton, Foreign and Commonwealth Office.
- Alan Everard Montgomery, HM Ambassador, Manila.
- Geoffrey David George Murrell, OBE, Minister/Counsellor, HM Embassy, Moscow.
- The Honourable Michael Aidan Pakenham, HM Ambassador, Luxembourg.
- Michael John Priestley, lately Senior Adviser, United Nations Development Programme, New York.
- Adrian John Sindall, British High Commissioner, Brunei.

=== Royal Victorian Order ===
==== Knight Commander of the Royal Victorian Order (KCVO) ====
- (John) Robin Catford, CBE.
- Dr. Anthony Michael Dawson.
- Sir Ashley Charles Gibbs Ponsonby, Bt., MC.
- The Right Honourable George Kenneth Hotson, Baron Younger of Prestwick, TD, DL.

==== Commander of the Royal Victorian Order (CVO) ====
- 'Inoke Fotu Faletau.
- Kenneth Lionel Richardson, QSO.
- Major Thomas Edward St. Aubyn.
- The Right Honourable John Julius, Viscount Norwich.
- Jocelyn Edward Greville Stevens.
- Robin Denys Gill.
- Sir Antony Rupert Jay.
- Edward Ouri Mirzoeff.

==== Lieutenant of the Royal Victorian Order (LVO) ====
- Jennifer Adams.
- William Gavin Buchanan.
- Richard Saxon French, MVO, RVM.
- Commander David Newing, Royal Navy (Retired).
- Geoffrey Nolan.
- The Lady Angela Mary Rose Oswald.
- Anthony Patrick Smyth.
- Jane Armyne Stevens.
- Philip Bonham-Carter, MVO.
- Catrine Patricia Clay.
- Peter Leslie Edwards, MVO.
- Neville Labovitch, MBE.
- Sarah, The Honourable Lady Riddell.

==== Member of the Royal Victorian Order (MVO) ====
- Alan Beattie Armstrong.
- Chief Inspector John Derek Askew, Metropolitan Police.
- Eric James Baker.
- Inspector Roger Franklin Barrell, Metropolitan Police.
- Loris Amelia Callander, MBE.
- Thomas Leonard Corby.
- Clare Goode.
- Diana Grahame.
- Pamela Anne Lewis.
- John Patrick Manley.
- Henrietta Francis Ryan.
- Jonathan Spencer.
- Alan James Lygo.
- Brian John Herring.

==== Medal of the Royal Victorian Order (RVM) ====
In Silver

- Local Acting Chief Marine Engineering Mechanic (Mechanical) David Bosomworth (D150924G), Royal Navy.
- Sergeant Garry Philip Robert Cole (G8127208), Eng. Tech. A.E., Royal Air Force.
- William Edward Marsden Cotton.
- Evelyn Mary Dagley.
- Police Constable Tony Basil George, Metropolitan Police.
- Terence Richard Hampstead.
- Terence John Alfred Hicks.
- Francis Kirkpatrick.
- Michael Robert Puzey.
- James Regan.
- William Johnston Robb.
- Sergeant David Leslie Spouge (K8089151), Eng. Tech. Av., Royal Air Force.
- Ronald George Welbelove, MBE.
- Mervyn Seth Wycherley.
- Radio Supervisor William John Young (D132137X), Royal Navy.

Bar to the RVM in Silver

- Thomas Galbraith, RVM.

=== Order of the Companions of Honour (CH) ===
- Sir Victor Sawdon Pritchett, CBE, Writer.

=== Order of the British Empire ===
==== Dame Commander of the Order of the British Empire (DBE) ====
Civil Division

- Catherine Ann Cookson, OBE, Novelist. For charitable services.
- The Honourable Mary Drummond Corsar, National Chairman, Women's Royal Voluntary Service.
- Mary Alison Glen-Haig, CBE. For services to Sport.
- Anne Laura McLaren, Research Fellow, King's College, Cambridge. For services to Science.
- Annette Penhaligon. For political and public service.
- Margaret Berenice Price, CBE, Opera Singer.

==== Knight Commander of the Order of the British Empire (KBE) ====
Military Division

- Lieutenant General The Honourable Thomas Patrick John Boyd-Carpenter, MBE, (452231), late Scots Guards.

Civil Division

- The Right Honourable Terence Langley Higgins, MP, Member of Parliament for Worthing. For political service.

Diplomatic Service and Overseas List

- Michael Ramsay Melhuish, CMG, Head of European Commission Monitor Mission, Zagreb.

==== Commander of the Order of the British Empire (CBE) ====
Military Division

Royal Navy

- Surgeon Commodore John Michael Beeley, QHP.
- Captain David Arthur Henry Kerr, OBE.
- Commodore Douglas Raymond Snell Lewis.
- Captain Peter Arthur Voute.

Army

- Brigadier Anthony Barrie Atkinson (467523), Army Catering Corps.
- Brigadier Robert Michael Bullock (467494), late Royal Corps of Transport.
- Colonel David Stevenson Hall, TD, (458865), late Royal Army Ordnance Corps, Territorial Army.
- Colonel Oliver John Martin Lindsay (459289), late Grenadier Guards.
- Brigadier Peter Anthony Little (479028), late 2nd King Edward VII's Own Gurkha Rifles.
- Colonel Andrew Jeffrey Pinion (454145), late Royal Regiment of Artillery.
- Colonel David Cautley Nasmyth Shaw, MBE, (482831), late The Devonshire and Dorset Regiment.
- Brigadier Charles Brockbank Telfer, ADC, (484601), Royal Pioneer Corps.

Royal Air Force

- Group Captain Owen Gerald Bunn, MBE.
- Air Commodore John Anthony Gerard May.
- Air Commodore Graham John David Maynard.
- Group Captain Richard Skene Peacock-Edwards, AFC.

Civil Division

- Ingrid Victoria Allen (Mrs. Barnes), Professor of Neuropathology, Queen's University, Belfast. Consultant and Director, Northern Ireland Regional Neuropathology Service.
- Richard Armstrong, Conductor.
- Frank Barlow, Managing Director and Chief Operating Officer, Pearson Group. For services to the Newspaper Industry.
- John Alfred Barnes, Director-General, City and Guilds of London Institute. For services to Vocational Training.
- Peter George Beazley, MEP, Member of the European Parliament for Bedfordshire South. For political service.
- Kenneth Bellamy, Grade 5, Department of Social Security.
- John Evelyn Beringer, Professor of Molecular Genetics, Bristol University. For services to Science.
- Robin Russell Clive Bloomfield, Farmer. Chairman, Ministry of Agriculture, Fisheries and Food's Anglia Regional Panel. For services to Agriculture.
- Lester Borley, lately The Director, National Trust for Scotland.
- Peter Bowring. For voluntary services to the Arts and to the Elderly.
- The Lord John Ulick Knatchbull Brabourne, Film and Television Producer.
- Charles Barrie Byford, OBE. For political and public service.
- Gerard Anthony Dillon Coghlan, OBE, Chairman, West Birmingham Health Authority.
- Patrick John Anson Coldstream, Director, The Council for Industry and Higher Education.
- The Reverend Frederick Charles Copleston, Professor Emeritus of the History of Philosophy, Heythrop College, London.
- Roger David Corley, Managing Director, Clerical, Medical and General Life Assurance Society. For services to the Insurance Industry.
- Sidney Corob. For services to Christian-Jewish relations and for charitable services.
- Leslie Crowther, President, Lord's Taverners. For charitable services.
- Alexander Daly, Managing Director, Engineered and Agritechnical Products, GKN. For services to the Engineering Industry.
- David Gwilym Evans Davies. For services to Local Government and to the Community in West Wales.
- Peter Henry Dean, Deputy Chairman, Monopolies and Mergers Commission. For services to Industry.
- John Christopher Paul Edmonds, Member, British Railways Board.
- Frederick Michael Everard, President, Chamber of Shipping. Chairman, F. T. Everard & Sons Limited. For services to the Shipping Industry.
- Brian Leonard Eyre, Chief Executive and Deputy Chairman, United Kingdom Atomic Energy Authority.
- Andrew Ferguson, Grade 5, HM Customs & Excise.
- Edwin Peter Foden, Chairman and Chief Executive, ERF. For services to the Truck Industry.
- Colin John Ford, Head, National Museum of Photography, Film and Television, Bradford.
- Anthony David Garrett, Deputy Master and Comptroller, Royal Mint.
- James Melville Goodsman. For political service.
- David John Graham, QPM, Chief Constable, Cheshire Constabulary.
- Professor Duncan Joseph Greenwood, FRS, Head, Department of Soils and Crop Nutrition, Horticulture Research International, Wellesbourne. For services to Plant Nutrition and Soil Science.
- Peter Brian Greenwood. For political service.
- Harold Hastings Gunson, National Director, National Directorate of the Blood Transfusion Service. For services to Medicine.
- Raymond Walter Hall, Executive Director of Operations, Nuclear Electric plc.
- Arthur Richard Cole-Hamilton, lately Chief Executive, Clydesdale Bank. For services to Banking.
- Michael Hart, Professor of Physics, University of Manchester.
- David Anthony Crichton Heigham, Economist Grade 5, Department of the Environment.
- Frank Charles Henshaw, lately General Manager, Milton Keynes Development Corporation.
- John Mackintosh Howie, Regius Professor of Mathematics, University of St. Andrews. For services to Education.
- Edward Charles Humphreys, Main Board Director, Dalgety plc. For services to the Flour Milling Industry.
- David Charles Ingman, Chairman, British Waterways Board.
- John David Jackson, Chairman and Chief Executive, The Centaur Clothes Group Limited. For services to the Clothing Industry.
- Professor William Philip Trehearne James, Director, Rowett Research Institute, Aberdeen. For services to Science.
- John Francis Jarvis, Owner, Jarvis Hotels. For services to Tourism.
- John Peter Jonas, General Director, English National Opera.
- Arthur Edward Jones, President, International Badminton Federation. For services to Badminton.
- James Ogilvie Keir, Director Supply, Rolls-Royce plc. For services to the Aero-engine Industry.
- Professor David Hamilton Lawson. For services to the Committee on the Review of Medicines.
- Robert John Lewis, Director of Social Services, Stockport.
- Viscount Richard Gerard Long, Lord-in-waiting (Government Whip). For political service.
- Robert Graham Lusk, Grade 5, HM Board of Inland Revenue.
- Michael John Manser, Principal, Manser Associates. For services to Architecture.
- Clive Roger Mason, lately President, Institute of Purchasing and Supply. For services to Industry.
- John Mather, Chairman and Chief Executive, Clydeport Limited.
- Charles Middleton Allen McCarthy, Deputy Chairman, McCain Foods GB Limited. For services to the Potato Processing Industry.
- Donald McCullin, Freelance Photojournalist.
- Terence Patrick Melia, lately Chief Inspector, HM Inspectorate of Schools.
- Anthony Patrick Mitchell, Chairman, Van Heyningen Brothers Limited. For services to Horticulture.
- John Moores, Chairman of Governors, Liverpool John Moores University.
- Alexander Fraser Morrison, Chairman and Managing Director, Morrison Construction Group Limited. For services to the Construction Industry.
- William Charles Carnegie Morrison, Deputy Senior Partner, KPMG Peat Marwick. For services to Accountancy.
- William Robert Morrow, Chairman, Milk Marketing Board for Northern Ireland. For services to the Dairy Industry.
- Aidan Anthony Mullett, QPM, Director-General, National Criminal Intelligence Service. For services to the Police.
- Denis James Northrop, lately Grade 5, Ministry of Defence.
- John Robert Pearson, QFSM, County Chief Fire Officer, Hampshire Fire & Rescue Service.
- Paschal Aidan Power, lately Grade 5, Ministry of Agriculture, Fisheries and Food.
- Edward Timothy Razzall. For political and public service.
- Professor John Richmond. For services to Academic Medicine.
- John Davie Manson Robertson, OBE, Chairman, Highland Health Board. For public service in the Highlands and Islands.
- Professor Andrew Rutherford, lately Warden, Goldsmiths' College.
- Terence William Sage, Assistant Comptroller, The Patent Office.
- Peter Basil Sanders, Chief Executive, Commission for Racial Equality.
- Geoffrey Christopher Schild, Director, National Institute for Biological Standards and Control. For services to Science.
- John Edward Scotford, County Treasurer, Hampshire County Council. For services to Local Government Finance.
- (James) Christopher Sharp, Managing Director, Northern Rock Building Society. Chairman, Council of the Building Societies Association 1991–1992.
- Colin Don Shaw, Director, Broadcasting Standards Council.
- Clinton Vita Silver, Deputy Chairman and Managing Director, Marks & Spencer. For services to the Retail Industry.
- David Bryden Sinclair, lately Chairman, Potato Marketing Board. For services to Agriculture.
- Janet Delahoy Buchanan-Smith. For political and public service.
- Pamela Veronica Smith, OBE. For political and public service.
- Malcolm John Soards, Grade 4, Foreign & Commonwealth Office.
- William Leonard Sparks, Grade 4, Home Office.
- William James Speechley, Chairman, Education Committee, Lincolnshire County Council.
- Professor Alastair Andrew Spence, President, Royal College of Anaesthetists.
- Daphne Felicity Statham, Director, National Institute for Social Work.
- Alan Breach Tayler, Director, Centre for Industrial and Applied Mathematics, University of Oxford. For services to science and to industry.
- Martin Gibbeson Taylor, Vice-Chairman, Hanson. For services to Industry.
- John Thaw, Actor.
- Nigel Ernest Drummond Thomson, Sheriff of Lothian and Borders, Edinburgh Sheriff Court.
- Nicholas Edward True, Special Adviser to the Prime Minister.
- Frank William Walbank, Rathbone Professor Emeritus of Ancient History and Classical Archaeology, University of Liverpool.
- Colin Warbrick, Leader, Trafford Metropolitan Borough Council.
- Philip Gordon Weekes, OBE, Chairman, Garden Festival Wales 1992. For public service in Wales.
- Ann Josephine Weinstock, Chief Executive, Rathbone Society. Director, Training and Enterprise Council, Manchester. For services to training of people with learning difficulties.
- John Derek Wheatley, board member and lately Chief Executive, National Rivers Authority.
- Adrian Edwin White, chairman, Biwater Limited. For services to Export and to the Water Industry.
- David Cade Wigglesworth, lately Chairman, Confederation of British Industry's Economic Situation Committee. For services to Industry.
- Edward William Wills, Official Solicitor, Church Commissioners.
- Professor Hamish Christopher Swan Wood, Chairman, Governing Body, Glasgow Polytechnic.
- David Harry Robert Yorke, lately Senior Partner, Weatherall Green & Smith. For services to Surveying.
- Leslie Ronald (Jimmy) Young, OBE, Broadcaster.

Diplomatic Service and Overseas List

- Professor George Robert Bishop, lately Adviser, European Commission Joint Research Centre, Brussels.
- Brian George John Canty, OBE, lately Governor, Anguilla.
- Quinton Lancelot Edness, JP. For public services in Bermuda.
- Dr. Victor Fung Kwok-King, OBE. For public services in Hong Kong.
- Dr. Gareth Howell, Director, British Council, Malaysia.
- Dr. Charles Kuen Kao, Vice-Chancellor, Chinese University of Hong Kong.
- David Geoffrey Lang, QC, Attorney-General, Falkland Islands.
- Andrew Li Kwok Nang, JP. For public and community services in Hong Kong.
- David George Pendleton Taylor, Governor, Montserrat.
- Yeung Kai-yin, JP, Secretary for the Treasury, Hong Kong.

==== Officer of the Order of the British Empire (OBE) ====
Military Division

Royal Navy

- Commander John Bithell.
- Commander Barry Richard Coward.
- Commander Peter Graham Edger.
- Commander Peter Wentworth Hammond.
- Commander Alfred George Kennedy, MBE.
- Commander Malcolm Jeffray Kitchin.
- Commander Anthony St. John Steiner.
- Captain (X) Peter Anthony Taylor, Royal Fleet Auxiliary Service.
- Commander Colin Gilbert Traill.
- Local Lieutenant Colonel John Manning Ware, Royal Marines.
- Commander David Simon Haydon White.

Army

- Lieutenant Colonel Edward Bradley Lawrence Armitstead (483849), Coldstream Guards.
- Lieutenant Colonel (now Colonel) Stephen Charles Holbrook Ashworth (479163), late The Worcestershire and Sherwood Foresters Regiment.
- Lieutenant Colonel Tweedie McGarth Brown (492621), Corps of Royal Engineers.
- Lieutenant Colonel Andrew Stuart Craig (491431), Corps of Royal Engineers.
- Acting Lieutenant Colonel Michael Frederick Forey (475517), Combined Cadet Force, Territorial Army.
- Lieutenant Colonel Malcolm Anthony Grant-Haworth (480313), The King's Regiment.
- Lieutenant Colonel Richard Edward Haes (481782), The Royal Anglian Regiment.
- Lieutenant Colonel David Peter Hughes (483935), Royal Corps of Signals.
- Major Brian Andrew Kay, TD, (450261), The Honourable Artillery Company, Territorial Army.
- Lieutenant Colonel Stewart Cunningham Kirkwood, TD, (508064), Corps of Royal Engineers, Territorial Army.
- Lieutenant Colonel Adrian Rudolph Lyon (463581), Corps of Royal Electrical and Mechanical Engineers.
- Lieutenant Colonel Dennis James Martindale, (503187), Army Physical Training Corps.
- Lieutenant Colonel Amedee Charles Mieville (487546), The Princess of Wales's Royal Regiment.
- Acting Colonel William Rainnie Porteous, TD, (432072), Army Cadet Force, Territorial Army.
- Lieutenant Colonel Susan Elizabeth Reynolds (501435), Adjutant General's Corps (SPS).
- Lieutenant Colonel Michael Edwin Alan Syms, MBE, (488494), Royal Corps of Transport.
- Lieutenant Colonel John Patrick O'Farrell Webster, MBE, (484054), The Gloucestershire Regiment.

Royal Air Force

- Wing Commander David John Coward, MBE, (2780050), (Retired).
- Wing Commander Anthony George Eley (0508230), Royal Auxiliary Air Force.
- Wing Commander Alexander William Garroch (0508256).
- Wing Commander Peter Patrick Victor Gaskin (4335838).
- Wing Commander Anthony Robert Norman Higgs (0505674).
- Wing Commander Geoffrey Peter North (4231452).
- Wing Commander Alan Jeffrey Smith (5203121).
- Wing Commander Ian Fraser Todd (208126), Royal Air Force Volunteer Reserve (Training).
- Wing Commander Richard Herbert Turpin (3517347).
- Wing Commander Brian Leonard Warsap (4186711).
- Wing Commander Dilwyn Nigel Williams (5202889).

Civil Division

- Robert Aagaard, Chairman, Cathedral Camps. For services to Conservation.
- Kathryn (Kate) Adie, Correspondent, British Broadcasting Corporation Television News.
- The Reverend David Lionel Allonby, Chairman, Central Council of Probation Committees.
- William Henry Antliff, Grade 7, Property Service Agency Services, Department of the Environment.
- Lieutenant Colonel The Reverend Guy Lionel Walter Armstrong. For services to the community on the Isle of Wight.
- David Harold Baillie, Grade 6, Ministry of Defence.
- Professor David Ernest Hall Balmford, Chief Scientist, Westland Helicopters. For services to helicopter development.
- Paul Michael Barrett, Chairman, Tropical Africa Advisory Group. For services to Export.
- The Reverend Kenneth Vincent John Bartlett, lately Assistant Chief Executive, Housing Corporation.
- John Julius Bash. Director, Commission for Local Administration in England. For services to Local Government.
- Thomas William Baugh, Managing Director, Asia Pacific Region, Vickers Marine-Engineering, Hong Kong. For services to the Engineering Industry.
- Gerald Fox Belton, Chairman and Managing director, MI Technologies Limited. For services to Industrial Training.
- Christopher John Beynon, Farmer. For services to Agriculture in Wales.
- Reginald Albert Bickerton, Senior Adviser, E. D. & F. Man (Coffee) Limited. For services to the Coffee Industry.
- Professor William Black. For services to economic development in Northern Ireland.
- James Peter Blakey, Chief Horticultural Marketing Inspector, Ministry of Agriculture, Fisheries and Food.
- Henry Mark Garneys Bond, Chairman, Dorset Police Authority.
- Thomas Calvin Booth, Grade 6, Forestry Commission.
- Elfed Morris Bowen, MVO, lately Principal Information Officer, Welsh Office.
- Howard William Bradley, Director, University of Cambridge Institute of Education.
- Colin Thomas Brannigan, Regional Managing Director, Reed Regional Newspapers.
- John Henry Thomas Brewer, Research Consultant, Defence Systems Division, Vickers plc. For services to the Defence Industry.
- Yvonne, Mrs. Brewster, Artistic Director, Talawa Theatre Company.
- George Brown, Chief Executive, Dunfermline District Council, Fife.
- Dominic Bruce, MC, Member, Governing Body, St Mary's University, Twickenham.
- Eric Reginald Bryan, Research Professor of Civil Engineering, University of Salford. For services to the Engineering Industry.
- Professor Robert Angus Buchanan, Director, Centre for the History of Technology, Science and Society, University of Bath.
- John Neville Bulman, lately Grade 6, Overseas Development Administration.
- Alexandra Vivien Burslem, Deputy Vice-Chancellor, Manchester Metropolitan University.
- John Campbell, Baxi Professor of Casting Technology in the School of Metallurgy and Materials, and in IRC High Performance Materials, University of Birmingham. For services to Science.
- Roy Castle, Entertainer. For charitable services.
- Marjorie Lancaster Caygill, Grade 7, British Museum.
- David Thomas Chambers, Group Marketing Director, DCE Group Limited. For services to Export and to Environmental Protection.
- David Robert Coleman, Sports Journalist, British Broadcasting Corporation.
- Ronald Ashton Hilton Collinge, Consultant, The Manchester Ship Canal Company.
- Kenneth Collis, lately Chairman, Manchester Central Hospitals and Community Care National Health Service Trust.
- Angela Louise Comfort. For political and public service.
- John Edward Cox, Chairman, Air Transport Users' Committee. For services to air transport.
- Thomas William Cox, Vice Chairman, Association of District Councils; Member, Woodspring District Council.
- James Irvine Cromarty, General Manager, Chief Administrative Medical Officer and Director of Public Health, Orkney Health Board.
- William Ruxton Cruickshank, Convener, Banff and Buchan District Council, Aberdeenshire.
- John Dainty. For political and public service.
- Denis Daley, Senior Consultant Physician, Morriston and Singleton Hospitals, Swansea. For services to the National Health Service.
- Paul Davies, Correspondent, Independent Television News.
- David George Michael Davis, Managing Director, Dowty Aerospace Propellers. For services to the Aerospace Industry.
- Peter Robert Christian Davis. For political and public service.
- Colonel Michael Anthony Demetriadi, TD, Commander, St. John Ambulance, Suffolk.
- Clifford Harry Dixon, Principal, Norfolk College of Arts and Technology.
- George Hubert Graham Doggart, lately Treasurer, Marylebone Cricket Club. Current President, English Schools' Cricket Association.
- William Robert George Eakin, Group Managing Director and Chairman, Parkman Consulting Engineers. For services to the Transport Industry.
- Dorothy Edwards. For services to the Church Lads and Church Girls Brigade.
- Professor Michael Frederick Edwards, Principal Engineer, Unilever Research. For services to Science and Engineering.
- Thomas Trevor Edwards, Assistant Director, Engineering Services, British Nuclear Fuels plc.
- Roy Lyon Evans, General Secretary, Iron and Steel Trades Confederation.
- Roydon John Falla, President, Advisory and Finance Committee, Guernsey.
- David Wenlock Faull, Diocesan Legal Secretary and Registrar, Dioceses of London and Southwark; Chapter Clerk, St Paul's Cathedral.
- Anne Ferguson, Head of Group Advertising and Sponsorship, ICI plc; chairman, Advisory Committee on Advertising.
- Mary Flora MacKinnon Firth, DL. For political and public service.
- David John Foulis, Director, Personnel and Employee Relations, Cammell Laird Shipbuilders Limited.
- David John Fox. For political and public service.
- John Gerard Fox, Town Solicitor, Belfast City Council.
- Tonie Gibson, chairman, Management Board, Cambridgeshire College of Health Studies.
- Peter Julian Ginger, Vice President, Defence Marketing, British Aerospace plc. For services to the Aircraft Industry.
- Evelyn Elizabeth Ann Glennie, Musician.
- Brian Sidney Goodland, lately Director, Safety and Environmental Affairs, Texaco Limited. For services to the Oil Industry.
- Jennifer Gove. For political and public service.
- Raymond John Grainger, Director, Product Regulatory Affairs, Chemical Industries Association Limited. For services to the Chemical Industry.
- George Peter Gray, lately Deputy Chairman, Rural Development Commission.
- Sally, Lady Greengross, Director, Age Concern England.
- Joan Greenwood, Nursing Officer, Midwifery Department of Health.
- Maureen Spencer-Gregson. For political and public service.
- Neville Frederick Hackett, President, Rotary International in Great Britain and Ireland.
- Carl Eric Hadley, Managing Director, British Alcan Wire & Conductor Limited. For services to Industry.
- James Colin Garforth Halley, Chairman, William Halley & Sons Limited, Dundee. For services to Industry in Scotland.
- Iain Douglas-Hamilton. For services to the Preservation of the African Elephant.
- Lilian Janet Frances Hammond, Director and Secretary, Walbrook Housing Association, Derby.
- William Fred Hannon, Founding Member and Member of the council, British Institute of Innkeeping.
- Frank Harding, Technical Director, Milk Marketing Board of England and Wales. For services to the Dairy Industry.
- Ernest Allen Hargreaves, District Nursing Officer, Bradford Health Authority.
- Sydney Michael Frank Harris, Lately Director and Senior General Manager, Guardian Royal Exchange. For services to the Insurance Industry.
- Elizabeth Harriet Harvey Wood, Head, Literature Department, British Council.
- Geoffrey Malcolm Hearnshaw, lately Inspector, HM Inspectorate of Schools.
- Audrey Shore Henshall. For services to Archaeology.
- Brian John Elliot Hinde, Director, Natural Environment Research Council Scientific Services. For services to Science.
- Shirley Diana Holden, Grade 7, HM Board of Inland Revenue.
- Peter Travers Hughes, Chairman and Managing Director, Glencast Limited. For services to the Steel Industry.
- John Michael Hyslop, Managing Director, AOC International Limited. For services to the Offshore Oil and Gas Industry.
- Herbert Hugh John, Medical Officer of Health, Port and City of London. For services to the Corporation of London.
- John Cameron Oliphant Johnston, Business Development Director, Tilbury Douglas Construction Limited. For services to the Transport Industry.
- Dennis Mackay Jones, Director, Meningococcal Reference Laboratory, Public Health Laboratory Service, Manchester.
- Stanley Wyn Jones, Chief Administrative Nursing Officer, Clwyd Health Authority; Member, Project 2000. For services to health care in Wales.
- Robert Thomas Jordan, MBE, Director, Northern Ireland Chamber of Commerce and Industry.
- Stephen John Keynes, Chairman of the Trustees, Whitechapel Art Gallery, London.
- Zaka Ullah Khan. For public services.
- Philip Arthur Kilshaw, Deputy Senior Fire Safety Inspector, HM Fire Service Inspectorate.
- Devarajan Krishnamurti, lately Consultant Psychiatrist, Ely Hospital, Cardiff.
- Margaret Stephen Tait Langton, lately Technical Director, British Standards Institution. For services to Industry.
- Peter Crevie Lee. For political and public service.
- John Benjamin David Creighton Lewis, Treasurer, National Executive, Association of Optometrists. For services to Optometry.
- John Lindsey, lately Chairman, Independent Board of Visitors, Royal Naval Detention Quarters, Portsmouth.
- Arthur Denis Linfoot, lately Registrar, University of Kent at Canterbury.
- Ian Lang Livingstone, Chairman, Lanarkshire Development Agency. For public service in Lanarkshire.
- Peter Longley. For services to the Amberley Chalk Pits Museum and to the Community in West Sussex.
- Nancy Beaton Loudon, Vice Chairman, Health Education Board for Scotland.
- Lawrence Albert George Lowton, lately Headteacher, Garforth Comprehensive School, Leeds.
- John Macpherson, Depute Director of Education and Head of Further Education, Strathclyde Regional Council.
- David Maddox, Adviser to the Mid-Glamorgan Education Authority.
- Catherine Maree Mair. For political service.
- Kenneth William Masterson, Assistant Chief Constable, Royal Ulster Constabulary.
- Edgar Frank Maybanks, QPM, Chief Commandant, Metropolitan Special Constabulary.
- Daniel McKeeman, lately External Logistics and Motor Transport Manager, British Telecommunications plc, Northern Ireland.
- Donald McLean, Commercial Director, Cumbernauld Development Corporation. For public services in Cumbernauld.
- Elizabeth Kinnell McLean, Chief Area Nursing Officer, Lothian Health Board.
- John McMyn, Farmer. For services to Agriculture in Scotland.
- James McVittie, Headteacher, St. Ninian's High School, Eastwood, Renfrewshire.
- Major John Fulton Scott Miller, TD, lately National Chairman, The Royal British Legion, Scotland.
- Charles Henry Moore, lately Director, John Grooms Association for Disabled People.
- Donald George Morrison, Convener, National Farmers' Union of Scotland's Soft Fruit and Vegetable Committee. For services to Horticulture.
- Alberto Morrocco, Artist.
- Oona Grant Muirhead, Grade 7, Ministry of Defence.
- David Mullarky, Grade 7, Home Office.
- Professor Palmer John Newbould, Chairman, Council for Nature Conservation and the Countryside, Northern Ireland.
- The Reverend Canon Peter Charles Nicholson, General Secretary, St Luke's Hospital for the Clergy.
- John Edward Noakes, General Medical Practitioner, Harrow, Middlesex. Vice Chairman, Royal College of General Practitioners 1990–1992.
- William O'Loughlin, Governor 1, Deputy Director of Prison Operations, Northern Ireland Prison Service.
- Brian Oldridge, lately Director of Transportation, Cambridgeshire County Council.
- Sheila Pantry, Head of Information Services, Health and Safety Executive, Department of Employment.
- Mary Vere Parkinson, Civilian Medical Practitioner, Royal Air Force Strike Command, Ministry of Defence.
- Stanley Patterson. For services to Archery.
- Laurence Noel Payne, Station Head, Houghton Poultry Research Station, Institute for Animal Health, Agricultural and Food Research Council. For services to Science.
- Mark Payne. For political service.
- Thomas Peet, MBE. For political service.
- Ian Watt Pinkerton, TD. For services to the St. Andrew's Ambulance Association.
- Michael John Reilly, President and Managing Director, Calasonic International (Europe) Limited. For services to the Automotive Industry.
- Judith Mary Rich, Director, 1959 Group of Charities, lately Vice-Chairman, British Diabetic Association. For charitable services.
- Martin Gomm Richards, Managing Director, The MVA Group. For services to Transport.
- Dennis Snow Ridley, World Health Organisation Expert, Advisory Panel on Leprosy.
- Helen Robinson (Mrs. Preston), Non-Executive Board Member, London Transport.
- John Jeremy Thomas Dillon-Robinson, lately Member of the council, National Farmers' Union.
- Patrick Robert John Rock. For political service.
- Sylvia Betty Rodrigues. For political service.
- William Ernest Rogers, Chief Executive, Alyn and Deeside District Council, Clwyd.
- Norman Alexander Royce, Consultant Architect, Royce Hurley & Stewart.
- The Honourable Catherine Dorothy Ruck. For political and public service.
- David Byron Samuel, Operations Director of South Wales Electricity.
- Pauline Lucie Samuelson, DL, Vice Chairman, Joint Committee of the Order of St. John and the British Red Cross Society.
- Arthur Hall Sanderson, Chairman, Cavanagh & Gray Limited. For services to the Food Industry.
- Heather Barclay Sheerin, Board Member, Scottish Homes. For services to the Housing Association Movement.
- Ivor Derek Shelley, lately Director, Royal Institute of Public Administration.
- David Trevor Shutt. For political service.
- Andrew Henry Simon, Chairman, Evode Group plc. For services to Export and to Industry.
- Anthony Sleight, Business Controller, Eastern Hemisphere, Foseco International Limited. For services to Export and to the Chemical Industry.
- Keith Douglas Smith, lately Headteacher, Aylesbury Grammar School, Buckinghamshire.
- Irene Anne Ivy Snelling, Headteacher, Stratford Grant Maintained School.
- David Michael Barclay Sole. For services to Rugby Union Football.
- Michael James Stewart, lately England Cricket Team Manager. For services to Cricket.
- Jack Herbert Storer, Consultant to the Banking Industry.
- Ian Stoutzker, chairman, Live Music Now.
- Gordon David Strachan. For services to Association Football.
- Donald William Straughan, Inspector, Animals Inspectorate, Home Office.
- Frederic David Styan, Director, Education Management, North West.
- John Gordon Sunley, Consultant on the structural use of Timber. For services to the Forestry and Timber Industries.
- Professor Anthony John Newman-Taylor, Chairman, Research Working Group of the Industrial Injuries Advisory Council.
- Paul Ernest Laidman Temple. For services to Horticulture.
- Peter Michael Thomas, lately Grade 6, Court Administrator, Lord Chancellor's Department.
- Nigel Thomson, Cameraman, Independent Television News.
- Richard Andrew Palethorpe Todd, Actor.
- Professor Charles William Trowbridge, Chairman, Vector Fields Limited. For services to Science.
- Margaret Rona Van Vliet, lately Chairman, Nottingham Advisory Committee on Justices of the Peace.
- Josephine Miriam Wagerman, Headteacher, Jews' Free School, Camden.
- David Morrison Walker, Chief Inspector of Historic Buildings, Scottish Office.
- Norman Caulfield Walker. For services to the Abernethy Trust Limited.
- Patrick Granville Walker, Chairman and Chief Executive, Watmoughs (Holdings) plc. For services to Publishing.
- Dorothy Elsie Mary Ward, DL. Area Organiser, Home Counties North, Women's Royal Voluntary Service.
- Albert Samuel Watts. For political and public service.
- Michael Joseph Webber, National Training Manager, Biscuit, Cake, Chocolate and Confectionery Alliance. For services to the Food Industry.
- Philip Robin Whitbourn, Regional Director (South), Conservation and Chief Architect, English Heritage.
- George Ernest Whittlesea, lately Grade 7, Department of Employment.
- Lawrence Wild. For political and public service.
- Professor David Raymond Williams, Member, Radioactive Waste Management Advisory Committee.
- Royce Osborne Windley, Chief Executive, BIMEC Aero and Industrial Technology plc. For services to the Engineering Industry.
- John Midgley Woodall, Managing Director, Woodall Mechanical Services. For services to the Construction Industry Advisory Committee.
- Professor John Frank Woodward, lately Vice Principal, The University of Paisley.
- William Herbert Brice Yarr, Chief Executive, Royal Ulster Agricultural Society.
- Angela Betty Yeoman, chairman, Foster Yeoman. For services to Environmental Protection.

Diplomatic Service and Overseas List

- Professor Antonia Frances Bagshawe. For medical services to the community in Zambia.
- Richard Martin Donne Barrett, lately First Secretary, United Kingdom Mission to the United Nations, New York.
- The Right Reverend Keith John Benzies, Bishop of Antsiranana, Madagascar.
- Mary Bradfield, MBE, lately Political Affairs Officer, HM Embassy, Stockholm.
- John Maurice Brown, lately First Secretary, HM Embassy, Ankara.
- Major Vincent Bennett Browne, MBE. For public and community services in Montserrat.
- Frederick Peter Carson. For services to the British community in Brussels.
- Dr. Peter John Alleguen Clark, lately Cultural Attache, HM Embassy, Abu Dhabi.
- Clive Edward Donald, QPM, CPM, lately Commissioner of Police, Bermuda.
- Roger Gordon Fry. For services to British cultural and community interests in Spain.
- Frederick Henry Gibbs. For services to British banking and commercial interests in Brazil.
- Roger James Adam Golland, lately First Secretary, HM Embassy, Buenos Aires.
- Richard Arthur Griffin. For services to British commercial interests in the Netherlands.
- Ali Mustafa Gursoy. For services to British commercial interests in Cyprus.
- Richard Edward Hale. For services to British commercial interests in Singapore.
- Richard John Freer Hoare, JP, Private Secretary to His Excellency The Governor of Hong Kong.
- Michael Holmes, MBE, HM Consul, British Consulate, Florence.
- Michael Stuart Hone, MBE, Chief Secretary, St. Helena.
- Trevor Edgar Mount Kirby, lately International Staff, NATO Headquarters, Brussels.
- Peggy Lam Pei Yu-dja, MBE, JP. For public services in Hong Kong.
- Lionel John Lee, lately Head of Interpretation Service, NATO Headquarters, Brussels.
- Dr. Martin Litherland. For services to geological surveying in Ecuador.
- Keith Harry Lomas, QPM, CPM, Deputy Commissioner, Royal Hong Kong Police Force.
- Constantinos George Lordos. For services to British commercial interests in Cyprus.
- Richard John Lyon. For services to British commercial interests in Paris.
- Patrick Joseph McCormick, Deputy Head of Mission, HM Embassy, Holy See.
- Dr. Soames Martyn Claude Michelson, First Secretary (Medical Officer), British High Commission, Dhaka.
- Clive William Baker Oxley, ED, JP, Commissioner of Customs and Excise, Hong Kong.
- Colville Lionel Petty, Permanent Secretary (Establishments), Anguilla.
- Arthur John Frederick Stagg, MBE. For services to British aviation interests in Saudi Arabia.
- Valerie Ann Taylor. For services to the rehabilitation of paralysed patients in Bangladesh.
- James Tien Pei-chun. For public services in Hong Kong.
- Professor Bernard Arthur Walter Trevallion. For services to development planning in Ghana.
- Peter Wong Hong-yuen, JP. For public services in Hong Kong.
- Patricia Lloyd Zeppel, MBE, lately Assistant to the Director, British-Council, Australia.

==== Member of the Order of the British Empire (MBE) ====
Military Division

Royal Navy

- Lieutenant Commander James Catterson.
- Lieutenant (CS) Anthony John Cokes.
- Lieutenant Commander (MS) John Richard Dalgleish.
- Lieutenant Commander Robert Embleton.
- Lieutenant Commander Morleymor Alfred Leslie Fisher.
- Lieutenant Commander Ian Kerr Hewitt.
- Lieutenant Commander (SCC) William David Keery, Royal Naval Reserve.
- Lieutenant Commander (SCC) Thomas Edwin Kinsey, Royal Naval Reserve.
- Warrant Officer 1 Michael Arthur Northfield, Royal Marines.
- Lieutenant Commander Robert Fergus O'Sullivan.
- Lieutenant Commander Michael Robert Palmer.
- Lieutenant Commander Gordon John Perry.
- Lieutenant Commander David Araul Clayton Poole.
- Warrant Officer Alan Edwin Wakeford.
- Lieutenant Commander Geoffrey Neil Wright.

Army

- Captain Robert Rowland Axup (527943), Adjutant General's Corps (RMP).
- Major Ian Beck (513164), Scots Guards.
- Captain Royston Charles Blewitt (500121), The Royal Welch Fusiliers, Territorial Army.
- 24184266 Warrant Officer Class 1 Robert Charles Broadbent, The Royal Regiment of Fusiliers.
- Captain Edward George Browning (512798), The Parachute Regiment, Territorial Army.
- Major Robin Andrew Michael Christmas (482701), The Princess of Wales's Royal Regiment.
- Major Brian Peter Clesham (505220), 2nd King Edward VII's Own Gurkha Rifles.
- Major Douglas Charles Coe (519586), The Royal Anglian Regiment.
- Major Julian Alan Collett (500811), Royal Regiment of Artillery.
- Major Shaun Philip Cowlam (501574), Royal Corps of Transport.
- Major Brian Robert Nangle Davidson (486629), The Royal Irish Regiment.
- Captain Stephen Paul Davies (526087), The Light Dragoons.
- Major John Stanley Malcolm Edwardes (491445), The Royal Highland Fusiliers.
- 24151690 Warrant Officer Class 1 Malcolm John Emery, Corps of Royal Electrical and Mechanical Engineers.
- Captain Michael William Everton (521399), Royal Corps of Transport.
- Major Kirk Ramsey Gillies (496838), The Royal Scots.
- Major Andrew John Noble Graham (500820), The Argyll and Sutherland Highlanders.
- Major Clive Osborne Hodges (495529), The King's Regiment.
- Major Peter Charles James (516690), The Royal Regiment of Wales.
- Captain John James Jobes (495800), The King's Regiment, Territorial Army.
- Major Andrew James Benjamin Johnston (503849), Coldstream Guards.
- LS23989856 Warrant Officer Class 2 Kevin Cranidge Jones, The Royal Anglian Regiment.
- 24265096 Warrant Officer Class 2 (now Warrant Officer Class 1) Alan Thomas Kennedy, The Royal Highland Fusiliers.
- Major (Acting Lieutenant Colonel) Hamish Forbes Mylechraine Killip (488026), Corps of Royal Engineers.
- Major (now Lieutenant Colonel) David Anthony Kyd (486305), Adjutant General's Corps (RMP), Territorial Army.
- Major Michael Lithgow (504479), Royal Corps of Signals.
- 24136141 Warrant Officer Class 2 (Acting Warrant Officer Class 1) George David Lloyd, Corps of Royal Electrical and Mechanical Engineers.
- Acting Captain Frederick John Malcolm Mair (467517), Army Cadet Force, Territorial Army.
- 24265624 Warrant Officer Class 2 James Anthony McGowan, Scots Guards.
- Captain George Douglas McMeeken (496047), The Devonshire and Dorset Regiment, Territorial Army.
- LS24003013 Warrant Officer Class 2 (Local Warrant Officer Class 1) Michael Vincent Moore, The Green Howards.
- Captain Maurice William Neville (500639), Yorkshire Volunteers, Territorial Army.
- 24181719 Warrant Officer Class 1 Colin Northridge, Royal Regiment of Artillery.
- Major Robert William Hunt Purdy (504849), Royal Regiment of Artillery.
- LS22841129 Warrant Officer Class 1 George Barras Routledge, Royal Tank Regiment.
- 24098220 Warrant Officer Class 2 Peter Alan Sanderson, Corps of Royal Engineers.
- Captain (now Major) Laurence Smith (524145), Royal Regiment of Artillery.
- 24195653 Warrant Officer Class 1 Martin Smith, Royal Corps of Signals.
- 24167766 Warrant Officer Class 1 Martin Jeffrey Smith, Royal Regiment of Artillery.
- Major (now Lieutenant Colonel) Oliver David Arthur Smith (492982), The Cheshire Regiment.
- 24031845 Warrant Officer Class 2 Thomas Taylor, Royal Pioneer Corps, Territorial Army.
- Major Michael Richard Toms (495590), Royal Corps of Transport.
- Major John Hugh Varley (474080), The Worcestershire and Sherwood Foresters Regiment.
- Major Alistair Angus Wood (498946), The Blues and Royals.
- Major David Ronald Yorke (513615), Coldstream Guards.

Overseas Award

- Major Michael Ip Wing Hung, Royal Hong Kong Regiment (The Volunteers).

Royal Air Force

- Warrant Officer Richard Alderson (Y3526702).
- Warrant Officer Thomas Barrie Ballantyne (HI937116).
- Squadron Leader John Bell (682673).
- Flight Lieutenant William George Frederick Blair (209523), Royal Air Force Volunteer Reserve (Training).
- Warrant Officer Shaun Patrick Broaders (G4255761).
- Squadron Leader David Lucien Bruce (5204770).
- Squadron Leader Derek Clinging (8023119), (Retired).
- Squadron Leader Ivor Robert Dalton (1945170).
- Warrant Officer Eric Charles Day, BEM, (S8088330), Royal Air Force Regiment (Retired).
- Squadron Leader John Gareth Evans (5202396), Royal Air Force Regiment.
- Master Aircrew Paul Graham Gibson (T8110879).
- Squadron Leader Fiona Jean Groves (0009340).
- Flight Lieutenant Malcolm Wayne Haywood (5205121).
- Squadron Leader Christopher David Hill (8025832).
- Master Aircrew Duncan Martin McDougall (H4180525).
- Warrant Officer Alan John Miller (J1942614).
- Squadron Leader Hugh O'Neill (209016), Royal Air Force Volunteer Reserve (Retired).
- Warrant Officer Michael Vincent O'Reilly (HI941383).
- Squadron Leader Robert Charles Peer (5200923).
- Squadron Leader Peter Leonard Ruthen (2620707), (Retired).
- Flying Officer Brian Anthony Sallis (8009651).
- Squadron Leader John Hudson Simpson (8023156).
- Warrant Officer Roger James Smith (K0686634).
- Warrant Officer William Walker, BEM, (X3526593), (Retired).
- Squadron Leader Terence Bernard Joseph Yarrow (8020927).

Civil Division

- John Barry Alldritt, Divisional Superintendent, St John Ambulance Brigade, Wilnecote Division.
- Iris May Allen. For services to the Trinity Hospice, Clapham.
- Kathleen Bessie Allen, chair, Mental After Care Association.
- Tom Anderson, Superintendent II Physiotherapist, Glasgow Royal Infirmary.
- Beryl Edyth Archer, District Organiser, Women's Royal Voluntary Service, Brighton.
- Elizabeth Anna Atchison, lately Librarian, John Innes Institute, Agricultural and Food Research Council.
- Robert John Barber, assistant director of Nursing Services (Security), Broadmoor, Berkshire.
- Peter George Barnes, lately Senior Professional and Technology Officer, Ministry of Defence.
- James Barr, Divisional Manager, Contracts and Commercial Division, Yarrow Shipbuilders Limited.
- Oliver William Barratt, lately Secretary, Cockburn Association. For services to Conservation in Scotland.
- Frank Norman Bate, Registrar, the Arnold Scheme Register. For services to Ex-Service personnel.
- Robert Barrowman Beattie, Manager, IBM Scotland Community Investment Programme. For services to Employee Volunteering.
- Hilary Beauchamp, Lecturer and Teacher in Art, Holloway Prison.
- Margaret Anne Bedlington, lately Higher Executive Officer, Crown Prosecution Service.
- Michael Behr, Overseas Consultant to the Overseas Development Administration. For services to Disaster Relief.
- Tadek Beutlich, Weaver.
- James Frederick Blanchard. For services to the development of Agriculture, particularly the Pig Industry.
- Barrie Stuart Blower, Chief Executive, Caldmore Area Housing Association, Walsall. For services to the Housing Association Movement.
- Christopher Miles Boardman. For services to Cycling.
- William Cyril Booth, chairman, Wythenshawe Catholic Handicapped Fellowship. For services to the Disabled.
- Terry Boundy, lately Chief Veterinary Officer, Royal Welsh Agricultural Society.
- William Bourhill, chairman, East Motherwell District Housing Association Limited.
- Clare Ada Bowen. For services to the Community, and to Soroptimist International, in Bridgwater, Somerset.
- John Alfred Boxall, County Road Safety Officer, Buckinghamshire County Council.
- Alan Bradley, chairman, Wearside Business Education Council.
- Barbara Ann Brewis. For political service.
- Barry Steven Brewster, TD, General Medical Practitioner, Settle, Yorkshire.
- Zena Lilian Bridgeman. For political and public service.
- Robert Ernest Bridges, General Manager, Westcombe Industries. For services to the employment of the Disabled.
- Marjorie Agnes Brown, Manager, Citizens' Advice Bureau, Sevenoaks.
- Robert Iain Froude Brown, National Training Adviser, Scottish Council on Alcohol and Senior Lecturer in Psychology, University of Glasgow.
- Simon Peter Bryceson. For political service.
- David Russell Burton, Environmental Health Manager, Mendip District Council.
- Lawrence David Burton, associate director, Dennis Ruabon Limited. For services to Industry.
- Valerie Ann Butcher, Joint Managing Director and Owner, Bluemay Limited. For services to Industry.
- Joanna Margaret Reader Buxton. For services to the Community in Westminster, London.
- Joan Byrne, Personal Secretary to the Chief Executive, British Nuclear Fuels Limited.
- Jane Pears Carmichael, managing director, Maribo UK. For services to Agricultural Research.
- John Carroll. For services to literature at Kenwood.
- Alan Ernest Carter, lately Professional and Technology Officer, Ministry of Defence.
- Brian Stanley Carter, Higher Executive Officer, Ministry of Defence.
- Ronald John Cattermole, Senior Executive Officer, The Patent Office.
- Ena Maud Challis, Senior Personal Secretary to the chairman, Science and Engineering Research Council.
- John Malcolm Stuart Clark, Superintendent, South Yorkshire Police.
- Hazel Mary Cook, Typing Manager, The Insolvency Service, Department of Trade and Industry.
- Walter Anthony Cook, Curator, Peakirk Wildfowl Trust Centre. For services to Conservation.
- John Raisley Coope, General Medical Practitioner. For services to the Community in Bollington, Cheshire.
- Florence Eva Crackles. For services to Botany and to Nature Conservation.
- Eileen Craggs, Member, UK Central Council for Nursing, Midwifery and Health Visiting.
- John Craynor. For service to the Guide Dogs for the Blind Association in Scotland.
- Kenneth Ernest Creer, Chief Photographer, Metropolitan Police Forensic Science Laboratory.
- Anne Beryl Crick, Senior Personal Secretary, Health and Safety Executive, Department of Employment.
- Margaret Croft, Executive Officer, Department of Employment.
- Phillip Cronshaw, Executive Engineer, Systems Computing, Military Aircraft Division, British Aerospace Defence Limited. For services to the Defence Industry.
- Carmel Ann Bernadette Crowther, Inspector of Taxes S, Her Majesty's Board of Inland Revenue.
- Ronald Albert Curtis. For political and public service.
- Thomas Curtis. For services to the public and to the Community in Surrey.
- Douglas Walter McGeorge Davidson, Community Pharmacist, Blairgowrie, Perthshire.
- The Reverend Ian Murray Pollock Davidson, Minister, Church of the Holy Rude, Stirling.
- Alfred Roy Davies, Inspector of Taxes S, HM Board of Inland Revenue.
- John Thomas Davies, Manager, Contract Safety Services, Sedgwick Consulting Group. For services to Health and Safety in Industry.
- Sharron Elizabeth Davies. For services to Swimming.
- Stanley George Francis Davies, Regional Officer, Royal Society for the Protection of Birds, South West England Region. For services to Conservation.
- Tom Stanley Deeming, chairman, Derbyshire, Leicestershire and Staffordshire War Pensions Committee.
- Frank Defty. For services to the Woodard Corporation of Church of England Schools.
- Jessie Annandale Denholm, Inspector of Taxes S, HM Board of Inland Revenue.
- Ebrima Dibba, Assistant Head, East Sector, Surrey Adult Education Service.
- Robert John Arthur Dick, Divisional Officer, Central Region Fire Brigade, Scotland.
- Daniel Patrick Dougherty. For political and public service.
- Graham Arthur Doust. For political service.
- Claire Frances Dove, Director, Women's Technology Centre, Liverpool.
- Anne Finley Downes, Director of Appeals and Public Relations, Forces' Help Society and Lord Roberts Workshops.
- Mary Ann Dursley. For services to Oxfam in Bristol.
- Henry Fowlie Duthie. For services to the community in Fraserburgh, Aberdeenshire.
- James Wood Dyce. For services to the British Pteridological Society.
- David Lawrence Eaglestone, lately Head of Office Machinery Technical Services, HM Stationery Office.
- Brian James Marchand Edmunds, Secretary, London Society of Chartered Accountants.
- Terence Eggleshaw, National Chairman, Dry Stone Walling Association.
- Margaret Ruth, Lady Elliot, lately Member, Board of Trustees, Royal Botanic Garden, Edinburgh.
- Elly Maria (Sally) Ellis, Social Secretary, Wembley Stadium.
- Pamela Enderby, District Speech Therapist, Frenchay Health Authority, Bristol.
- John William Enever, Senior Careers Officer, London Borough of Tower Hamlets.
- Bryan Evans, musical director, Pavilion Opera.
- Judith Clare Evans, Practice Nurse, Cambridgeshire.
- John Kinsman Evans, Senior Probation Officer, Middlesex Area Resettlement Unit.
- Molly Forcer Evans. For services to the public and to the community on Anglesey.
- Audrey Edwina Fairey, General Medical Practitioner, London.
- Clare Denise Fancote, Member, Birmingham City Council.
- Harry Feigen, General Secretary, Licensed Taxi Drivers' Association.
- Professor Peter Michael Fidler, Dean, Faculty of the Built Environment, University of the West of England, Bristol.
- Clarice Beryl Flux, Senior Executive Officer, Ordnance Survey.
- Donald Alfred Fogg, Acting Chief Executive, Allerdale District Council, Cumbria.
- Francis Myrddin Fordham, Port Engineer, Grimsby and Immingham, Associated British Ports.
- Edward Robert Forshaw, Principal Consultant, CF Europe Limited. For services to Computing.
- Barbara Ellen Gall, Force Welfare Officer, Merseyside Police.
- Jean Dorothy Gammons, Chief Archivist to the Post Office.
- Kenneth William Gardner, Personnel Manager, SCA Packaging Limited, Hartlepool. For services to Industrial Relations.
- Michael Anthony Anderton Garrett. For political and public service.
- David Gibbons, chairman, RSVP Advisory Group, Community Service Volunteers.
- Pauline Mary Gibbs, Administrative Officer, Department of Employment.
- Adrian Vernon Brough Gibson, For services to Conservation and Local History.
- Elsie Lilian Gilding, Director, the Royal London Trust. For services to the National Health Service.
- Nicholas Gillingham. For services to Swimming.
- Gerald John Ginn, lately Member, Rathgael and Whiteabbey Schools Management Board, Northern Ireland.
- Kay Glendinning, Senior Trustee and Administrator, Dunhill Medical Trust. For charitable services.
- Malcolm Charles Gower, chairman and Technical Director, Exitech Limited. For services to Industrial Laser Development.
- Jean Graham. For services to Music and to the community in Balloch, Scotland.
- Rene Graham, Personal Assistant to the Director, National House Building Council, Northern Ireland.
- Mair Elizabeth Morgan-Grey, co-founder, St. David's Educational Unit, Dyfed. For services to the Mentally Handicapped.
- Carys Davina (Tanni) Grey. For services to Athletics for the Disabled.
- Sally Jane Janet Gunnell. For services to Athletics.
- Margaret Mary (Peggy) Hackett. For services to the community in Milford Haven.
- Herbert Leslie Hall, Headteacher, Drummond Middle School, Bradford.
- Ian Donald Urquhart Hall, Regional General Manager, Northern Region, Meat and Livestock Commission. For services to the Meat Industry.
- Lyn Denise Marguerite Hall, co-founder, St. David's Educational Unit, Dyfed. For services to the Mentally Handicapped.
- Roy Hamilton, Commercial Director, Strathspey Railway. For services to the Transport Industry.
- Diana Grace Hamlyn, Honorary Secretary, Soldiers' Sailors' and Airmen's Families Association, Cricklade Division.
- Kenneth George Hammond, lately Senior Executive Officer, Property Services Agency International, Department of the Environment.
- Dorothy Jean Hanmer, Founding Member, Downend Folk House Association, Bristol.
- Jaqueline Mary Haq, chairperson, Scotswood Strategy and Scotswood Community Project, Newcastle upon Tyne. For services to the community in Scotswood.
- Maud Alice Hardy. For political service.
- Roy Clephan Harris. For services to the Health Service on the Isle of Wight.
- Russell Harris. For services to the South Wales Argus Group and to the Provincial Newspaper Industry.
- Rhona Christine Hartley, For political and public service.
- Molly Maureen Hay, lately Principal Youth and Community Officer, London Borough of Redbridge.
- Jack Haylock. For services to Anglo-American relations in Mildenhall, Suffolk.
- Marion Jean Hearse, District Nursing Professional Adviser. For services to the National Health Service in Wales.
- Mary Joan Dover Heaton, Senior Executive Officer, Department of Social Security.
- Sally Elisabeth Heddle. For services to Disabled People in Bromley, Kent.
- Louis Mario Hellman, Freelance Architect, Cartoonist and Writer. For services to Architecture.
- Garry Gerard Paul Herbert. For services to Rowing.
- Phyllis Mary Hermanns, Executive Officer, Department of Social Security.
- Margery Anne Herring, chairman, Godalming Blind Club. For services to the Blind.
- Shirley Higgins, Administrative Officer and Secretary to the National Director, Boys' Clubs of Wales.
- Sister Anna (Nancy) Hoare, Member of the Board, Lagan College. For services to the Community in Northern Ireland.
- Lieutenant Colonel Haldon Edward Hole (Rtd.), TD. For charitable services to the community in Manchester.
- Father Michael Richard Hollings, MC, chairman, Portobello Trust. For services to the Community in Notting Hill, London.
- Roy David Holman. For services to Residential Care for the Disabled.
- Christopher Holmes. For services to Swimming for the Disabled.
- Martin John Richard How, Commissioner for the South, Royal School of Church Music. For services to Church Music.
- Beryl Howard, Manager, Michael Sobell House, Mount Vernon Hospital Middlesex.
- David Howell, Patron and Secretary, Feltham Community Association. For services to the Community in Feltham.
- Hari Hughes, lately Assistant Divisional Officer, Clwyd Fire Brigade.
- Brian Turner Hunter, Member, Crofters' Commission.
- Charlotte Hutchins, County Vice-president, The British Red Cross Society, Derbyshire.
- Hilary Irma Irvine, lately Senior Executive Officer, Ministry of Defence.
- Hugh Graham Jackson, Director, NEI Reyrolle Limited. For services to the Engineering Industry.
- Marigold Johnson, Executive Secretary, British-Irish Association. For services to Anglo/Irish Relations.
- Victor Horace Johnson. For services to the Community in Solihull, West Midlands.
- Shirley Jones, Contracts Manager, Northumberland Family Health Services Authority.
- Thomas William Jones. For services to the Community in Melton Mowbray, Leicestershire.
- Marion Joshi, Clinical Nurse Specialist, Dudley Health Authority.
- Dorothy May Judge. For services to the public and to the Community in Kingston upon Thames.
- Arnold Helmut Carl Gustav Kammerling, chairman and Chief Executive, CEKA Works Limited. For services to Industry in Wales.
- Laurence Elliot Kearns, Association Works Officer, Territorial, Auxiliary and Volunteer Reserve Association.
- Desmond Keoghane, chairman, Falkland Families' Association.
- Sean Robin Kerly. For services to Hockey.
- William Patrick Kirkman, Director, Wolfson College Press Fellowship Programme. Lately Secretary, University Careers Service Syndicate. For services to the Newspaper Industry.
- Everitt Arthur Knights, Regional Recreational Development Manager, Anglian Water plc.
- Zbigniew Zdzislaw Jerzy Kosarski, chairman, Starkey's Technicast Limited. For services to Export and to the Iron Industry.
- Deryck Michael Denys Lambert, General Medical Practitioner. Medical Advisor, Derbyshire Family Health Services Authority.
- Norman Stratton Lammas. Higher Professional and Technology Officer, Ministry of Defence.
- The Reverend Ronald Lancaster, managing director, Kimbolton Fireworks Limited.
- Charles Grubb Lang, chairman, C. J. Lang & Son Limited. For services to the Food Industry.
- Antony Richard Langmack, Editor, Berwick Advertiser. For services to the Newspaper Industry.
- Margaret Law, Consultant on Fire Engineering, Ove Arup & Partners. For services to Fire Safety.
- David Arthur Lawrence, Property Director, Provinces, British Rail Property Board.
- Philip William Lawrence. For political service.
- Tony Lawson, Manager, Silverwood Colliery, South Yorkshire Group, British Coal Corporation.
- Ursula Theresa Lee, lately Senior Personal Secretary, Office of Public Service and Science.
- Captain Owen Charles Stuart Light, chairman, South West Scotland War Pensions Committee.
- John Frederick George Lock, lately Fleet Engineer, Fina plc. For services to the Oil Industry.
- Eileen Winifred Love, lately Headteacher, St. Matthew's Primary School, Wishaw, Scotland.
- Isabella Turner Macallister, Administration Officer, Islay Airport.
- Alan Semple Mace, managing director, Stadco Limited. For services to the Automotive Industry.
- Ann Macfarlane, First Vice President, Kingston Association of Disabled People. For services to Disabled People.
- Donald MacKenzie, Executive Secretary, Scottish Section, Federation of Civil Engineering Contractors.
- Linda Margaret MacKenzie, Higher Executive Officer, Ministry of Defence.
- Peter Charles Manning, Farm Manager, Askham Bryan College, York. For services to Agricultural Education.
- Timothy Marshall. For services to Sport for Disabled People.
- George Edwin Martin, Principal Doorkeeper, House of Lords.
- Lavina Cowie Massie, Senior Scientific Officer, Scottish Office.
- Roger William May. For services to Scouting, particularly for the Disabled.
- John Mayne, Senior Executive Officer, Ministry of Defence.
- Joseph Daniel McCaughey, Division Manager, Radar Satellites, Directorate of Science and Earth Observation, Matra Marconi Space UK Limited. For services to the Space Industry.
- Marie McCluskey, Director, Thamesdown Dance Studio, Swindon.
- Barbara Carr McCulloch. For political service.
- Terence Anthony Patrick McCurley. For political service.
- Moira McDermott, lately Senior Executive Officer, Department of Trade and Industry.
- Annella Rae McEwan. For services to the Theatre in Moray.
- Thomas McKinney, Manager, Dromona Quality Foods, Tassagh Creamery, Northern Ireland. For services to the Dairy Industry.
- Graham Henry Merrick, Organist, HM Prison Bristol.
- Roger David Mitchell. For services to Nature Conservation in Yorkshire.
- Kate Moore, chairman, Committee for the Employment of People with Disabilities.
- Martin Raymond Moore, Chief Superintendent, Royal Ulster Constabulary.
- John Mannering Mordue, Inspector of Taxes, HM Board of Inland Revenue.
- Leslie Richard Mortimer, Higher Professional and Technology Officer, Ministry of Defence.
- Iris Helen Moseley. For services to the Community in Stafford.
- Edward Mullin, Quality Training Manager, Vickers Defence Systems, Vickers plc. For services to the Defence Industry.
- Bernard Henry Richard Mussell, Transport Manager, Dorset Fire Brigade.
- Norman Clive Russell Myers, lately Secretary, Royal Marines Association, Bath.
- Alan Nickalls, Director of Marketing Services, Rolls-Royce plc. For services to Export and to the Power Industry.
- Alexander George Norrie, Farmer. For services to Agriculture in Scotland.
- Mary Isobel Oliver, Clinical Specialist (Midwifery), University Hospital of Wales. For services to the South Glamorgan Health Authority.
- Evelyn Priscilla Oxford, Senior Personal Secretary, HM Board of Customs and Excise.
- Juliet Pannett, Painter.
- Olga Louise Parker, chairman, Central Welfare Committee, Royal Air Forces Association.
- Thomas Kenneth Parr, chairman and managing director, Elizabeth King Limited. For services to the Food Industry.
- Goronwy Owain Parry. For political and public service.
- David Murray Paterson, lately Deputy General Secretary (Scotland), Banking, Insurance and Finance Union. For public service in Scotland.
- Iris Turner Paterson, Senior Personal Secretary, Scottish Office.
- Kathleen Mabel Peatey, Member, Wycombe District Council, Buckinghamshire.
- William Peter Penn, Senior Chief Technician, Department of Physiology, Charing Cross and Westminster Medical School, University of London.
- Joan Winifred Phillips, chair, Chell Heath, Estate Management Board, Stoke-on-Trent. For services to Housing Estate Management.
- Pamela Joan Pike. For political and public service.
- Joyce Mary Pinnick. For services to Orthoptics, especially in Wales.
- Matthew Pinsent. For services to Rowing.
- Terence William Plumb, District Inspector of Fisheries, Ministry of Agriculture, Fisheries and Food.
- Kenneth Walter Pocock, Governor, National Dairymen's Benevolent Institution. For services to the Dairy Industry.
- Alan Craig Pollard, managing director, Syndicate Underwriting Management Limited. For services to the Insurance Industry.
- Kathleen Potts, Chairman of Governors, Avondale Comprehensive School, Stockport.
- Margaret Ann Price, Higher Executive Officer, Registry of Friendly Societies.
- John Russell Pritchard, Safety and Performance Manager, British Railways, Crewe.
- The Reverend Canon Noel Proctor, Chaplain, HM Prison Manchester.
- Jean Raeburn, Children's Panel Training Organiser.
- Charles William Randall, Local Officer 1, Department of Social Security.
- Edna Pauline Redfern. For services to the Community in Manchester.
- David John Reeves, Divisional Officer III, D Division Headquarters, West Midlands Fire Service.
- Thomas Edward Ratcliffe Reeves, chairman, Finance Committee, City of Rochester Almshouses, Kent. For services to the Elderly.
- Stella Ena Roberts. For services to the National Health Service in Gwent.
- James Roy Robertson, General Medical Practitioner, Edinburgh.
- Geoffrey Walter Robinson, Member, Burton upon Stather Parish Council, Humberside.
- David Thomas Parslo Rogers, President and Secretary, West Wales Hospital League of Friends, Glangwili. For public service in Wales.
- Barley Elizabeth Roscoe, Curator, Holburne Museum and Crafts Study Centre, Bath.
- Margaret Betty Rosewell, lately Headteacher, Gorringe Park Middle School, Merton, Surrey.
- Derek William Rudge, District Public Duty Officer, St. John Ambulance Brigade, London District.
- Marjorie Isabelle Salmon, General Co-ordinator, Nurses' Christian Fellowship. For services to Nursing.
- Margaret Maxwell Samson, Welfare Officer, Department of Economic Development, Northern Ireland Civil Service.
- Kathy Sanchez, Sales Director, Richardson Sheffield Limited. For services to Export and to the Cutlery Industry.
- Gwen Savage, Proprietor, Gwen Savage & Co. For services to Training in Northern Ireland.
- Gwendoline Mary Scott. For political and public service.
- Gregory Mark Pascoe Searle. For services to Rowing.
- Jonathan Searle. For services to Rowing.
- Frederick James Russell Shadbolt, chairman, Management Committee, Sea Cadet Corps, Waltham Forest Unit.
- June Frances Sharpe. For services to the Community in Bristol.
- Bertram Edward Shaw, Member, National Council for Victim Support.
- Keith Charles Faraday Simpson, lately Assistant General Manager, Retail Banking, Yorkshire Bank plc. For services to Inner Cities.
- Gerald David Sloan, managing director, Downtown Radio, Northern Ireland. For services to Broadcasting.
- Thomas Albert Smallwoods, chairman, Northern Ireland Home Accident Prevention Council.
- Denise Jacqueline Smith. For service to Sport for the Disabled.
- Ernest Smith, Disabled Customer Liaison Manager, British Telecommunications plc.
- Mary McEwen-Smith. For political and public service.
- John Nicholas Speakman, TD. For political service.
- Colin Howard Spearing. For services to the Community in Evercreech, Somerset.
- Desmond Arthur George Spring, Senior Executive Officer, Department of Employment.
- Thomas Hugh James Steele, Veterinary Surgeon. For services to the Equine Industry in Northern Ireland.
- Royston John Stone, lately Optical Design Manager, Avimo Limited. For services to Science.
- Peter Lingard Stopforth, Governor 4, HM Prison Norwich.
- Derek Stott, lately Higher Executive Officer, Department of Health.
- Malcolm Archibald Stuart, Director General, National Caravan Council. For services to Tourism.
- Alasdair Johnston Sutherland, Principal Teacher, Modern Languages, Hunter High School, East Kilbride.
- Diana Margaret Taggart, Higher Executive Officer, HM Board of Customs and Excise.
- Michael Edward Tanner, Inspector, Warwickshire Constabulary.
- Gwilym John Thomas, Headteacher, Ravensbourne Special School, Essex.
- Winston Thomas, Community Relations and Education Superintendent, BP Chemicals. For services to Industry and Education.
- Gillian Margaret Thomson, chairperson, The Scottish Dyslexia Association.
- Frederick Stanley Thornton, lately chairman, Essex Local Flood Defence Committee, National Rivers Authority. For services to Land Drainage and Flood Defence in East Anglia.
- Barry Donald Thurnell. For political service.
- Urias Scoble Todner, Secretary and Chief Executive, Coventry & East Mercia Co-operative Society. For services to the Retail Industry.
- Ursula Marjorie Agnes Tokle, lately Higher Administrative Officer, Royal Society.
- Peter Townend, Senior Executive Officer, Department of Transport.
- Shirley Susannah Tremlett, Manager, Citizens Advice Bureau, Maidenhead.
- Audrey Lila Turner. For political and public service.
- Patrick Tweedale, Headteacher, Guns Village Junior School, West Bromwich.
- Ronald Waite, managing director, Bede Scientific Instruments Limited. Altec Engineering Limited. For services to Export and to Industry.
- Joyce Ethel Walker. For services to the Community in West Wickham, Kent, particularly to the British Red Cross.
- Robert Francis Walker, Line Revenue Protection Manager, Victoria Line, London Underground Limited.
- Barbara Diana Wallace. For services to the community in Bournemouth, Dorset.
- Watkin Laurence Geoffrey Watkins. For political service.
- The Reverend Victor John Watson, Minister, Walworth (Clubland) Methodist Church. For services to Race Relations and to the Community in Walworth.
- David Wells, Airworthiness Investigator of Tornado, Military Aircraft Division, British Aerospace Defence Limited. For services to the Defence Industry.
- Rosemary Westley, Departmental Superintendent, Royal Holloway and Bedford New College, University of London.
- David White, Transport and Plant Manager, National Rivers Authority. For services to the Water Industry.
- Ethel Nancie White. For political and public service.
- Captain Raymond Whitehouse, Keeper of the Central Criminal Court.
- John Wilkins, Organiser, Lister Optical Laser Appeal, Queen Elizabeth II Hospital, Welwyn Garden City. For charitable services.
- Barbara Wilson. For political service.
- Ian Victor Wilson, Marketing Manager, Pilatus Britten-Norman Limited. For services to the Aircraft Industry.
- Diana Winterbotham, County Local Studies Librarian, Lancashire County Council.
- Douglas George Wood, chairman, Operation Happy Child, British Airways. For charitable services.
- Joan Mary Wood. For services to the Women's Royal Voluntary Service, High Wycombe.
- John Robert Wood, lately Senior Information Officer, Central Office of Information.
- Leslie Woolnough, Tutor in Scene Painting, The Central School of Speech and Drama.
- William Henry Wyse, Department Manager, Product Support, Rolls-Royce & Associates Limited. For services to the Defence Industry.
- Jane Edgar Young, Member, Local Review Committee, HM Prison Dungavel.
- Derek Younger, Higher Executive Officer, HM Board of Customs and Excise.

Diplomatic Service and Overseas List

- Cynthia Anita Louise Astwood, Establishment Secretary, Turks and Caicos Islands.
- Dr. John George Bailey. For services to education and the community in Bhutan.
- Dr. Kristina Mary Baker. For medical services to the community in Zambia.
- Peter John Birkett, assistant director of Civil Aviation, Hong Kong.
- Alexandra Aikman Boyle. For nursing and welfare services to the community in Sudan.
- Hugh Douglas Brodie. For services to the British community in São Paulo.
- Joan Mary Brown, lately Principal Assistant, OECD, Paris.
- Dr. Vernon Le Roy Buffong, Dental Surgeon, Ministry of Health, Montserrat.
- Rosita Beatrice Butterfield. For public and community services in the Turks and Caicos Islands.
- Archibald John Chan Tai-wing, QPM, CPM, Senior Assistant Commissioner, Royal Hong Kong Auxiliary Police Force.
- Ann Margaret Chaplin. For welfare services to the community in Peru.
- Philip Chester. For welfare services to the community in Northern Iraq.
- Marion Nelson Conacher. For nursing and welfare services to the community in Madhya Pradesh, India.
- George Costa. For services to the community in Gibraltar.
- Andrew Leonard Couldridge. For welfare services to the community in Angola.
- Colin Wynn Crorkin, lately Management Officer, HM Embassy, Kinshasa.
- Lynn Marie Curran, lately Head of Registry, HM Embassy, Kinshasa.
- Rosalind Mary Davison. For nursing and welfare services to the community in Botswana.
- Alan Keith Dixon, Project Manager (Buildings), British Council, New Delhi.
- Idwal William Evans. For welfare services to disabled children in Tanzania.
- Jean Florence Ferries Hughes Fernandes, Commercial Officer, HM Embassy, Lisbon.
- Rosemary Hayes Francis. For welfare services to the British community in New York.
- Rita Frett-Georges, Chief Nursing Officer, British Virgin Islands.
- William John Grice. For services to agricultural development in Malawi.
- Thomas Edward Grimes. For services to the British community in Montpellier.
- John Frederick Hills. For services to the British community in Bulgaria.
- Patricia Anne Holder. For welfare services to visually disabled people in Uganda.
- Gladys Helen Hulse, Honorary British Consul, Arica, Chile.
- Jean Mary Ibbitson. For services to the British community in Madrid.
- Dorothy Bruce Jezzi. For services to the British School in São Paulo.
- Frank Edward King. For services to the British community in Sicily.
- Captain Mabry Salisbury Kirkconnell. For public and community services in the Cayman Islands.
- Albert Lai Kwok-wing. For community services in Hong Kong.
- Lau Chak-bun, Principal Inspector (Physical Education) Education Department, Hong Kong.
- Simon Lee Kwok-yin, JP. For community services in Hong Kong.
- Li Shiu-tsang, JP. For community services in Hong Kong.
- John Lok Hsiao-pei. For public services in Hong Kong.
- Samuel Lomberg. For services to British commercial interests in Copenhagen.
- Elspeth Jane MacGregor. For services to English Language teaching in Germany.
- Jenny Elizabeth Manderson, JP, Principal Secretary (Personnel), Cayman Islands.
- Brian Keith Mann, lately Third Secretary (Communications), HM Embassy, Peking.
- Charles Edward Marshall. For services to sport in Bermuda.
- Christopher John Mason. For welfare services to the community in Ethiopia.
- Valerie Jean McCosh, Senior Personal Assistant to the Chief Secretary, Hong Kong.
- Dr. Murdo Malcolm Hugh McKinnon. For services to British cultural interests in Canada.
- Joanne Denise Miles, Personal Secretary, HM Embassy, San Jose.
- Stanley Edwin Moseley, Assistant Accountant, HM Embassy, Copenhagen.
- Thomas Murphy, lately Senior Security Officer, HM Embassy, Manila.
- Julia Painting, lately Third Secretary, HM Embassy, Tallinn.
- Joan Pavelec. For services to the British community in Paris.
- Elizabeth Almeida Pereira. For services to the British community in Lisbon.
- Ralph Pixton. For services to broadcasting in Hong Kong.
- Patricia Mary Read. For services to the British community in Abu Dhabi.
- Sydney Ernest Richardson, BEM, MSM, lately Senior Security Officer, HM Embassy, Mexico City.
- Vera Rosemond May Robbins. For community services in Swaziland.
- Frank Ross, lately Vice-Consul, British Consulate-General, Frankfurt.
- Leonard Henry Down Scard. For services to the British community in Lamu, Kenya.
- Greta Schoeman. For welfare services to the community in Durban.
- David James Shearer. For welfare services to children in Somalia.
- Ian Malcolm Smith, Vice-Consul, British Consulate, Malaga.
- John Anthony Terry. For services to the British community in Jamaica.
- Jennie Naomi Wheatley, Deputy Principal, Tortola High School, British Virgin Islands.

=== Companion of the Imperial Service Order (ISO) ===
Home Civil Service

- Terence Anthony Bentley. Grade 7, Department of Social Security.
- Patrick Arnold Blackshaw. Grade 7, HM Board of Customs and Excise.
- Pamela Rose Boulderstone. Inspector of Taxes P, HM Board of Inland Revenue.
- Michael Dennis Dyer. Grade 7, Department of Trade and Industry.
- David Gowland. Grade 7, Department of Social Security.
- Kenneth Gordon Gowland. Inspector of Taxes SP, HM Board of Inland Revenue.
- Derrick Arthur Hall, lately Grade 7, Central Computer and Telecommunications Agency, Office of Public Service and Science.
- John Frederick Howard. Grade 7, Ministry of Agriculture, Fisheries and Food.
- Peter George Iredale, lately Grade 6, Department of the Environment.
- David Graham James, lately Grade 7, Advisory, Conciliation and Arbitration Service.
- Robert Meirion Jones, lately Grade 6, Foreign and Commonwealth Office.
- Geoffrey Knowles. Grade 6, Department of the Environment.
- Raymond George Spencer Leeson. Grade 6, Property Service Agency Services, Department of the Environment.
- Noel Hugh Maguire. Inspector of Taxes SP, HM Board of Inland Revenue.
- Ronald McDowell. Inspector of Taxes SP, HM Board of Inland Revenue.
- Richard Thomas Murray. Senior Principal Scientific Officer, Department of Transport.
- Lawrence Cecil Phelps. Inspector of Taxes SP, HM Board of Inland Revenue.
- Wilfred James Albert Powell, Principal Scientific Officer, Ministry of Defence.
- John Henry Russ. Grade 7, Ministry of Defence.
- Leonard Frederick George Small. Grade 7, Department of Health.
- Michael Brett Thornton, lately Grade 6, Ministry of Defence.
- Gordon Lockhart Walker. Grade 7, Department of Trade and Industry.
- Edwin Daniel Wall, lately Professional and Technology Superintending Grade, Ministry of Defence.
- William John Wylie, lately Grade 7, Department of Education, Northern Ireland Civil Service.

Diplomatic Service and Overseas List

- Adolf Hsu Hsung, JP, Director of Regional Services, Hong Kong.
- David Lan Hong Tsung, JP, Principal Hong Kong Economic and Trade Representative, Tokyo.
- Allan Charles Pyrke, JP, deputy director of Marine, Hong Kong.

=== British Empire Medal (BEM) ===
Military Division

Royal Navy

- Chief Petty Officer Steward David James Austin, D113041C.
- Chief Petty Officer Air Engineering Artificer (R) Michael Ayles, D150399Y.
- Charge Chief Marine Engineering Artificer (P) Leslie Roy Burden, M913863W.
- Petty Officer Airman (Phot) Alistair Lament Campbell, D135799E.
- Chief Petty Officer (Deck) Timothy Donovan, Royal Fleet Auxiliary Service, R879279.
- Charge Chief Marine Engineering Artificer (ML) (SM) Alan Foster, D108384D.
- Chief Petty Officer Physical Trainer Robert Paul Fung, D122666F.
- Chief Weapon Engineering Mechanic (R) John Hughes, D185664F.
- Charge Chief Communications Technician Michael Peter Metcalfe, D156511J.
- Chief Marine Engineering Mechanic (M) Philip James Morrissey, D132014V.
- Chief Petty Officer Stores Accountant Garry Page, D113591G.
- Acting Chief Petty Officer Radio Supervisor Carlton Eugene Leonard Rawson, D125643F.
- Colour Sergeant Raymond Abdoulie Sey, Royal Marines, P034722B.
- Colour Sergeant Merril George Southgate, Royal Marines, P030558L.
- Chief Petty Officer Weapon Engineering Artificer Gerard Robin Thurmer, Royal Naval Reserve, D987369U.
- Chief Marine Engineering Mechanic (M) Steven Richard Tinney, D102291L.
- Charge Chief Marine Engineering Artificer (P) Peter Raymond Young, D104482L.

Army

- 24159636 Staff Sergeant Malcolm Philip Richard Ball, The Royal Welch Fusiliers.
- 24607798 Corporal Michael Leslie Bland, Royal Army Ordnance Corps.
- 24475822 Sergeant Nigel Douglas Carr, Royal Regiment of Artillery.
- 24433187 Sergeant Peter Andrew Cassidy, Adjutant General's Corps (RMP).
- 24630693 Corporal Paul Raymond Chesters, Royal Corps of Signals.
- 22666653 Staff Sergeant William Clarke, Yorkshire Volunteers, Territorial Army.
- 24189428 Corporal Graham James Clough, Corps of Royal Engineers.
- 24091692 Sergeant Robert Appleton Collister, Adjutant General's Corps (RMP).
- 24274859 Sergeant Bernard Peter Connor, Army Catering Corps.
- 24233452 Staff Sergeant Thomas Drysdale Cornwall, The Royal Scots.
- 24446632 Staff Sergeant Andrew David Courtney, The Worcestershire and Sherwood Foresters Regiment.
- 24181271 Sergeant James Patrick Cox, Royal Regiment of Artillery.
- 24248395 Corporal James Davis, Royal Pioneer Corps.
- 24366318 Staff Sergeant James Andrew Davison, The Parachute Regiment.
- 23895853 Sergeant Frank William Dawson, Royal Corps of Signals.
- 24585544 Corporal (Acting Sergeant) Brian John Despard, Royal Army Ordnance Corps.
- 24523034 Staff Sergeant Owen John Dobson, Adjutant General's Corps (RMP).
- 24667481 Lance Corporal (Acting Corporal) Neil John Eaton, Army Catering Corps.
- 24450567 Lance Corporal George Fairbairn, Royal Pioneer Corps, Territorial Army.
- 24341567 Corporal (Acting Sergeant) Seamus Christopher John Finn, 9th/12th Royal Lancers.
- 23898808 Sergeant Graham Patrick Fox, The Light Dragoons.
- 24398563 Staff Sergeant Barrie Raymond Gill, Adjutant General's Corps (RMP).
- 24171231 Corporal Allan Grinham, The Princess of Wales's Royal Regiment.
- 21162935 Lance Corporal Bhuwaniprasad Gurung, 2nd King Edward VII's Own Gurkha Rifles.
- 21164183 Lance Corporal Shibaram Gurung, The Queen's Gurkha Engineers.
- 21163239 Sergeant Subasing Gurung, Gurkha Transport Regiment.
- 24746786 Sergeant Carl Andrew Hibbs, Royal Corps of Transport, Territorial Army.
- 23514237 Staff Sergeant Henry George Houston, The Parachute Regiment, Territorial Army.
- 24148488 Staff Sergeant Thomas Issac Huntley, Royal Regiment of Artillery.
- 24127945 Sergeant Kenneth Brian John, Royal Corps of Signals.
- 24306047 Staff Sergeant Robert Martin Jolly, Grenadier Guards.
- 24393778 Staff Sergeant David Anthony Jones, Royal Army Medical Corps.
- 24294367 Sergeant (Acting Staff Sergeant) Richard Joseph Carl Kefer, Welsh Guards.
- 24422527 Sergeant Paul Gordon Kenyon, The Gloucestershire Regiment.
- 24149642 Lance Corporal David John Kilford, Royal Corps of Signals.
- 24346525 Sergeant (Acting Staff Sergeant) David Norcross King, Royal Corps of Transport.
- 24149803 Sergeant Francis David Kurthausen, Royal Corps of Signals.
- 25004068 Private William Leonard, Royal Army Medical Corps.
- 24417486 Sergeant Paul Richard Lister, Royal Corps of Transport.
- 24500136 Staff Sergeant Anthony Paul McCreanor, Royal Army Ordnance Corps.
- 24375415 Sergeant Geoffrey McMullan, Royal Regiment of Artillery.
- 22750997 Corporal Anthony Morrell, Army Catering Corps, Territorial Army.
- 24185306 Sergeant Charles Brent Noble, Irish Guards.
- 24256693 Sergeant William Roy Palmer, Royal Tank Regiment.
- 24539448 Sergeant Martin Paul Payne, Army Physical Training Corps.
- 24673039 Sergeant David Peter Penniall, Adjutant General's Corps (SPS).
- 24213445 Sergeant (Acting Staff Sergeant) John Gordon Robertson, Royal Corps of Transport.
- 24245718 Sergeant William Hugh Rudland, Corps of Royal Engineers.
- 24458165 Sergeant Roy Ivor Smallwood, Corps of Royal Engineers, Territorial Army.
- 24286075 Corporal Mark Stuart Stanton, Royal Corps of Signals.
- 24310159 Sergeant Ian Gregory Tepielow, Royal Corps of Signals.
- 24164387 Staff Sergeant Michael Francis Tetlow, Scots Guards.
- 24394757 Corporal Mark John Tout, Royal Tank Regiment.
- HK/18264777 Corporal Moon Omen Tsang, Hong Kong Military Service Corps.
- LS23698433 Staff Sergeant (Local Warrant Officer Class 2) Reginald George Watkins, The Queen's Own Hussars.
- 24264386 Sergeant Michael Watts, Corps of Royal Electrical and Mechanical Engineers.
- 24355302 Corporal Guy John Wesley, Royal Pioneer Corps.
- 24201640 Sergeant Richard Cyril Yates, Royal Regiment of Artillery.
- 24315427 Staff Sergeant John William Younger, Royal Corps of Transport.

Bar to British Empire Medal

- 24159854 Corporal Robert Henry Hasnip, BEM, Army Catering Corps.

Royal Air Force

- Flight Sergeant Kimberly Ash (R8101402), Royal Air Force Regiment.
- Sergeant Peter James Boden (L8011937).
- Flight Sergeant George Brodie (F8077356).
- Sergeant Philip Scott Brown (H8204668).
- Corporal Eric Hugh Davis (R8129573).
- Sergeant (now Flight Sergeant) Geoffrey Rhys Forster (E8113222).
- Flight Sergeant Thomas Robert Hand (N1961873).
- Corporal Carl Francis Hodge (K8152950).
- Flight Sergeant Peter Kirkpatrick (L0594391).
- Flight Sergeant Stephen Michael Long (D8001701).
- Sergeant Cecilia May McAteer (C8056300), Women's Royal Air Force.
- Flight Sergeant David Henry Allan Meldrum (B0690413).
- Flight Sergeant Raymond Mitchell (El949238).
- Flight Sergeant David William Morgan (B1944601).
- Sergeant Ian Michael Rolland (F8204943).
- Sergeant Mark Jonathan Shimmons (G1950276).
- Flight Sergeant Andrew Smith (E8101465).
- Flight Sergeant George Tweddle (Y4257454).
- Sergeant Mandy Elizabeth Woodhead (A8062542), Women's Royal Air Force.
- Flight Sergeant Robin William Wright (R8104275).

Civil Division

United Kingdom

- Brinley William Adams, Quality Controller, Remploy.
- Edward George Adams, Sub-Divisional Officer, Metropolitan Police Special Constabulary.
- John Robert Akney. For services to the Sandhall Estate, Goole, North Humberside.
- Violet Evelyn (Queenie) Alcock, Office Manager, B. H. Leather Ltd.
- Joyce Mary Aldred, Personal Secretary, Legal Aid Board.
- Francis Brian Crozier Allett, Leading Ambulanceman, Erne Hospital, Enniskillen.
- Lewis George Archer. For services to the community in Lyddington, Wiltshire.
- Charles Robert Atherton, British Government Wireless Relay Station, Darwin.
- Joan Aileen Attewell, Personal Assistant, Marconi Defence Systems Ltd.
- Graham Edward Bailey, Leading Fireman, Ministry of Defence.
- Geoffrey Balson, Music Adviser to Lancashire County Education Authority.
- Loretta Lillian Barnes, Senior Receptionist and Telephonist, Brewers' Society.
- Patricia Joan Beard, Technical Assistant, National Rivers Authority.
- William Mervyn Beattie, Building Superintendent, Belfast Institute of Further and Higher Education.
- Harriett Betsy Bell. For voluntary and charitable services to disabled people and elderly people in County Londonderry.
- Marjorie Elison Bell. For services to the Chesham Voluntary Hospital Car Service, Buckinghamshire.
- Pearl Bennett, Secretary to the chairman, London Transport.
- Harold Benson, Customer Requirements Manager, British Aerospace Defence Limited.
- George Bentley, Leading Hand, Remploy.
- Elizabeth Oliphant Black. For charitable services to hospitals in Fife.
- Basil Blackbourn. For services to the Lincoln District Scout Band.
- Hugh Blair. For services to sport in Scotland.
- Margaret Blockley. For services to the Stroud Unit, Sea Cadet Corps.
- Colin Boon, Craft Fitter, British Nuclear Fuels plc.
- Gladys Irene Boud, lately Support Manager 3, Overseas Development Administration.
- William Sydenham Boulton, District Housing Development Manager, South Western British Gas plc.
- Graham Frederick Bradley, Storeman, A. F. Budge Ltd.
- Bert Brazier, Engineering Assistant (Electrical), Associated British Ports.
- Vera Joyce Mary Brigden, Typist, Ministry of Defence.
- John Anthony Brommage, Senior Ranger I, Forestry Commission (Scotland).
- Irene Evelyn Brookes, Cook, Carpenter House Probation Bail Hostel.
- James Brown. For services to the community in Yarrow and Earlston.
- Leonard Alfred Brown, Caretaker, Bray Parish Cemetery, Maidenhead.
- William Brown, Sergeant, Royal Ulster Constabulary.
- Ralph Brunton, Mechanic, Dunbar Lifeboat, Royal National Lifeboat Institution.
- Robert James Burn, Sergeant, Northumbria Police and for charitable services.
- Margaret Mary Burns, Typist, Training and Employment Agency, Northern Ireland Civil Service.
- Derek William Butler, lately, Head Verger, Ely Cathedral.
- Roy Butters, Motorway Supervisor, Bedfordshire County Council.
- June Campion. For services to the Hilltop Environment and Community Care in Belfast.
- Beatrice Lilian Carey. Administrative Assistant, Department of Social Security.
- Allan James Charles Carter, Support Grade Band 1 (Government Telephonist), Department of Social Security.
- Iris Elvera Challoner. For voluntary and charitable services to the community in Bangor, Gwynedd.
- William John Chandler, Senior Typist, Iron Trades Insurance Company Ltd.
- Kenneth Charles Chapman, Principal Keeper, Bull Point Lighthouse, North Devon.
- Marina Cheesemond, Nursing Auxiliary, South West Durham Health Authority.
- Patricia Scheheralade Childs. For services to education in Huntingdon.
- Doris Victoria Christie. For services to the Women's Royal Voluntary Service, Bagshot.
- John Walker Mullin Cluff, Deputy Superintendent Warder, Ulster Museum.
- Edna Coates. For charitable services to the community in Wakefield, Yorkshire.
- Douglas Claude Cole, Auxiliary Coastguard-in-Charge, Torbay.
- Mackenzie Morgan Collins. For services to the community in Wrington, Bristol.
- Roger Collins. For voluntary Plasma Donor services to the Regional Blood Transfusion Service, Hertfordshire.
- Frederick John Coulson, lately Spacetrack Leader, Serco Ltd.
- Margaret Coulthurst, Wages Clerk, R. E. Ormerod & Sons Ltd.
- Frank Holland-Coulton. For services to the Bolton Branch, Royal Air Forces Association.
- Thomas Cowen, lately Senior Payroll Controller, Swan Hunter Shipbuilders.
- Geoffrey Harold Cox, Sub Officer, Isle of Wight Fire Service.
- Sidney Ronald Crane, Voluntary Motorcycle Trainer and Examiner, Northamptonshire.
- Thomas Frederick Cridland. For services to Cancer Research Wales.
- June Winifred Croke, Steward Grade 2, Ministry of Defence.
- William Crompton. For services to the North East Council of Community Organisations.
- Carole Cullen, Secretary, British Nuclear Fuels plc.
- Thomas Ivor Cunningham, Fish Buyer and for services to the Fishing Industry.
- Caroline Muriel Darbyshire, General Clerk, British Nuclear Fuels plc.
- Lynn David, Lock Keeper, Abingdon, Oxfordshire.
- Bridie Teresa Dillon, lately Cleaner, Queen Mary and Westfield College, University of London.
- Paul Allan Dodd, Constable, Metropolitan Police.
- Yvonne Daphne Doust, Administrative Officer, Ministry of Defence.
- Ronald Kitchener Dowdall. For services to the William Harvey Hospital League of Friends.
- Mary Ellen Driscoll, Wardroom Mess Steward, HMS President, Royal Naval Reserve.
- Francis John Druce, chairman, Tilshead Parish Council.
- Maurice Joseph Dunn, Station Officer Retained, Durham County Fire Brigade.
- Eileen Marie Eastham, Administration Officer, Blackburn Unit, Sea Cadet Corps.
- Brian William Elphick, Highways Superintendent, East Sussex County Council.
- Roger Philip Emery, Postal Officer, Milton Keynes, The Post Office, and for services to the community in Oxfordshire and Bedfordshire.
- Dorothy May Emmett. Clerical Assistant, South Wales Electricity plc.
- Frederick Peter Endicott. For services to the 1st Barrington and Wrington Scouts and Guides, Avon.
- George Kenneth Robert Enstone. For services to the Cornwall, Devon, Isles of Scilly and Somerset War Pensions Committee.
- Robert Norman Espie, Constable, Royal Ulster Constabulary.
- Patricia Margaret Evans. For services to the Sidcup Social Club for the Blind, Kent.
- Kenneth Ralph Exworth, Constable, Metropolitan Police.
- Stanley Eyre. For services to the Gwent County, Royal British Legion.
- Marion Susan Parish, Local Officer II, Department of Social Security.
- Gregory Edward Farley, Trades Officer, HM Prison Birmingham.
- Douglas Feather. For services to young people in Dewsbury.
- Angelo Tony Arthur Ferrari, Skill Craftsman 1, Rutherford Appleton Laboratory.
- John Bernard Fletcher. For services to the Beechwood Community Association, Wirral.
- Sheila Margaret Ford. Senior Secretary, Vickers Shipbuilding & Engineering Ltd.
- Walter Thomas Forder, Production Operator, Vauxhall Motors Ltd.
- Leslie Bernard Gallop. For services to the Suffolk Branch, British Red Cross Society.
- Ronald Joseph Garbutt. For services to the St. John Ambulance Brigade and to sport.
- Catriona Gillies, Sub Postmistress, Cromarty Sub Post Office, Ross-shire, The Post Office.
- Lawrie Henry Glasson, Foreman Fitter, GEC Ferranti Defence Systems Ltd.
- Brenda Edith Gower, Secretary, South Eastern British Gas plc.
- Robert Ian Graham. For services to boxing in the North of England.
- Diane Mary Grainger. For services to the community in Stockport, Greater Manchester.
- Sybil Alexandra Grant, Personal Secretary, Ministry of Defence.
- Christopher John Green, Driver, Government Car Service, Department of the Environment.
- David Green, Driver, Trainload Freight, British Railways.
- Ernest Green, Sector Officer, HM Coastguard, Clwyd, Department of Transport.
- Moreen Grey, lately Personal Secretary, Ministry of Defence.
- Eileen Marjorie Guest. For services to the Women's Royal Voluntary Service at Dudley Hospital.
- Robert James Gurr, Detective Sergeant, Metropolitan Police.
- Betty Winifred Joyce Hagger. For services to the Cambridgeshire Branch, British Red Cross Society.
- Elizabeth Jane Halbard. For services to the community in Kettering, Northamptonshire.
- Teresa Hannigan, lately Cook and Supervisor, Lisnaskea High School.
- Iris Georgina Harding. For services to the Portsdale Branch of the Women's Royal Voluntary Service.
- Terence (Terry) Hardy, Foreman, Yorkshire Electricity Group plc.
- Percy Harley, Curator and Caretaker, Bridgnorth Town Hall, Shropshire and for services to the community in Bridgnorth.
- Lilian May Harness, Administrative Officer, Companies House Executive Agency, Department of Trade and Industry.
- Florence Jean Harrison, Administrative Assistant, Ministry of Defence.
- Sheila Georgina Harrod. For services to the Kentwood School of Music, Swindon.
- Michael Burnett Hatton, Senior Herdsman, Weston Hall Estate.
- Terrance William Haynes. For services to the St. John Ambulance Brigade in Grimethorpe.
- Doreen Florence Hearne, Parachute Packing Supervisor, Martin-Baker Aircraft Company.
- John Foster Hedley. For services to the community in Ryhope, Sunderland.
- Donald Maurice Hemsley. For services to the East Sussex Fire Brigade Council and the Fire Services National Benevolent Fund.
- Mellanda Henry, Support Grade Band 2, Central Office of Information.
- Lyvette Madeleine Hicks, Administrative Officer, Ministry of Defence.
- Edward William Higgins, Administrative Officer, Community Liaison Officer, Metropolitan Police.
- George David Rex Hipple, Head Verger and Subsacrist, Bristol Cathedral.
- Ruth Elizabeth Hoares, lately Secretary and Personal Assistant, University of Cambridge.
- John Edwin Holdsworth. For services to entertainment in Inverness and the Highlands.
- Albert Henry Holland, Station Officer Retained, Somerset Fire Brigade.
- Richard John Hook. For charitable services to the community in Portsmouth.
- Reginald John Hunt, Constable, Hertfordshire Constabulary and for services to mentally disabled people in Hertfordshire.
- Heather Margaret Huntley, Assistant Manager, British Cement Association.
- Bernice Eugenia Mary Hutson. For services to foster children in Swansea.
- John John. For services to the community in Dyfed.
- Jeanne Veronica Frances Johnson. For services to the Hertfordshire Branch, British Red Cross Society.
- Leonard Johnston, Principal Officer, Physical Education, HM Prison Maidstone.
- William Johnstone, lately Shepherd, Scottish Natural Heritage.
- Doreen Margaret Jones, Revenue Typist, Board of Inland Revenue.
- Dorothy Jones. For charitable services to children in Staffordshire.
- Edward Walter Jones, Administrative Officer, Property Services Agency International, Belize, Department of the Environment.
- Mary Jones, Constable, South Wales Constabulary.
- Muriel Constance Kay. For services to the community in Bebington and to the Women's Royal Voluntary Service.
- Ethel Lena Keevil, Executive Secretary, Texaco Ltd.
- Brian George William Kingston, Constable, Surrey Constabulary.
- Moses Lam, British Diplomatic Service Mail Office, Hong Kong.
- Robert William Langley, Constable, Norfolk Constabulary.
- Lilian Edith Langton. For services to the Royal Society for Mentally Handicapped Children and Adults.
- Joseph Norman Larrissey, Reserve Constable, Royal Ulster Constabulary.
- Ernest Law, Manager, Hedon Growers.
- Clive Frank Lawrence, Chargehand Electrical Fitter, Ministry of Defence.
- Anne Mary Bernadette Leatherland, Administrative Officer, Ministry of Defence.
- Robert John Lewis, Constable, Dyfed-Powys Police and for services to young people in Llanelli.
- James Lindsay, lately Secretary, Bellshill Division, Soldiers', Sailors' and Airmen's Families Association.
- Yvonne Lumley. For voluntary services to the community in York.
- Coryndon Putt Luxmoore, lately Rights of Way Assistant, Dorset County Council.
- Christine Lynch. For services to the Friends of Montgomery House.
- Charles Desmond Magee, Sub Officer, Lisnaskea, Fire Authority for Northern Ireland.
- David Lamb Maltman. Senior Officer (Instructor), HM Prison and Young Offenders Institution, Glenochil.
- Arthur Pearson Mann. For musical services to the community in Aldborough, Yorkshire.
- Thomas Marcus, Reserve Constable, Royal Ulster Constabulary.
- Constance Winifred Goodridge-Mark. For services to the community in West London.
- George William Marriott. For services to the West Midland War Pensions Committee, The Royal British Legion.
- Kathleen Elsie Mash. For services to the community in Bury St. Edmunds, Suffolk.
- Judith Massam. For services to the Women's Royal Voluntary Service at Chelmsley Hospital.
- Kathleen McAlmont. For services to the community in Compton, Surrey.
- Peter Thomas McAloon, Secretary, Eniskillen Credit Union Ltd.
- John Wilson McConkey, Administrative Officer, Territorial Auxiliary and Volunteer Reserve Association.
- Elizabeth McGrath. Administrative Assistant, Department of Health and Social Services, Northern Ireland Civil Service.
- John McGregor, Production Manager, Lord Roberts Workshops.
- Joseph Norman McIvor, Constable, Strathclyde Police.
- Allan McKechnie, Support Services Manager, Grampian Health Care.
- Bernard Malley McKeen, Head Driver, Scottish Enterprise.
- Charles Walker McKinnon, Volunteer Leading Firefighter, Strathclyde Fire Brigade.
- Diane Vera McLean, Personal Secretary, Department of Transport.
- Jemima McRostie. For services to the community in Helmsdale, Sutherland.
- Peter Richard Tayler Mean, Museum Support Grade 2, Imperial War Museum, Department of National Heritage.
- Thomas Elwyn Michael Metcalfe, Police Sergeant, Risley, United Kingdom Atomic Energy Authority Constabulary.
- Hastings Frank Middleton, Volunteer Observer, Meteorological Office.
- Pamela Milborrow. For voluntary services to Oxfam in Wales.
- Albert Ernest Millar, Industrial Staff Supervisor, Grade B, Department of Agriculture, Northern Ireland Civil Service.
- Claude David Millington. For services to disabled children in Wales.
- Stuart Millward, Pattern Maker and Plaque Carver, Butterley Brick Ltd.
- Irene Violet Milton. For services to the blind and to the community in Hertfordshire.
- John Alfred Minns. For services to the Cleveland Structural Engineering Steel Works.
- Ronald Percival Frederick Monk. For services to the London Transport Benevolent Fund.
- Jean Mooney, Auxiliary, Springfield Primary School, Glasgow.
- Derrick Harold Morris, Cargo Supervisor, Associated British Ports.
- Kenneth Francis Morris, Caulker Burner, Cammell Laird Shipbuilders Ltd.
- Robert Alexander Morton, Surface Foreman Fitter, Welbeck Colliery, British Coal Corporation.
- Jane Mary Mossman, Personal Secretary, Cabinet Office.
- Maureen Nagle, Local Officer II, Department of Social Security.
- Percy George Neat, Technical Grade 1, National Physical Laboratory, Department of Trade and Industry.
- Ronald Nicholls. For services to sport for disabled people.
- Helena Nolan. For services to the Pingot Adult Training Centre, Liverpool.
- Joseph O'Callaghan, Manual Operative, Scotforth Water Treatment Plant, North West Water plc.
- Terence John Clarke-O'Neill, Assistant Officer, Board of Customs and Excise.
- Leonard Harry Oakes, lately Senior Mechanical Inspector, Marconi Instruments Ltd.
- Annie Ornsby, Support Grade Band 2 (Cleaner), Board of Customs and Excise.
- Hazel Veronica Pacey. For voluntary services to the RSPCA in Lincoln.
- Thomas William Paintain, Curator, Force Museum, Northamptonshire Police.
- Irene Parker. For services to the Women's Royal Voluntary Service at Walton Hospital, Liverpool.
- Jane Anne Hamilton Parker. For services to the community and to the Hospital Radio Service in Abergavenny.
- Joan Margaret Parsonage, Foster Parent, Wiltshire Social Services Department.
- Ronald Albert Pashen, lately Street Warden, Purbeck District Council and for services to the community in Wareham, Dorset.
- Ernest John Pendray. For services to the community in Cornwall.
- Hazel Norma Perks, Administrative Officer, Ministry of Defence.
- Daphne Nina Perreau. For services to the community and the Dolphins Club in Dunmow, Essex.
- Margaret Phelan, Foster Parent, Lancashire County Council.
- Harold Harry Phillips, Member, Needham Market Town Council.
- William Pierce, Sub Officer Retained, Gwynedd Fire Service.
- William Ronald Pierce. For services to nature conservation at Ainsdale Sand Dunes National Nature Reserve.
- Susan Margaret Platt, lately Personal Secretary, Ministry of Defence.
- Beryl Patricia Potten, Catering Assistant, Wisborough Green Primary School, West Sussex.
- Elizabeth Barbara Potter. For services to the Women's Royal Voluntary Service in Cumbria.
- Sandra Potts, Administrative Officer, Department of Social Security.
- Roy Povey, Sub Officer Retained, Cheshire Fire Brigade.
- Thomas Prince. For services to the community in Lancashire.
- Robin Weir Ramsay, lately Senior Master, Pilot Cutters, Port of London Authority.
- Ernest Rimmer, Train Crew Supervisor, Trainload Freight, British Railways.
- Barrie James Roberts. For services to young people in Wallasey, Wirral.
- John William Roberts. For charitable services to the community in Alcester, Warwickshire.
- Gordon William Hartley Roberts. For services to the Rode Hall Silver Band, Staffordshire.
- Thomas Robinson, Driver, Trainload Freight, British Railways.
- Valerie Henderson Rutledge, Administrative Officer, Army Cadet Force.
- Stanley George Sandison, Fireman Attendant, Tingwall Airport.
- Edward Harry George Sankey, Arable Foreman, Agricultural Development and Advisory Service Executive Agency, Ministry of Agriculture, Fisheries and Food.
- Joan Scott. For services to animal welfare in Selby, North Yorkshire.
- William David Shanks, Sergeant, Durham Constabulary.
- Angus Henry Shaw. For services to Scottish Fiddle Music.
- Masood Ahmad Sheikh. For services to the community in Fulham.
- John Andrew Smethurst, Principal Officer, HM Prison Oxford.
- Marie Louise Sostman, Typist, Ministry of Agriculture, Fisheries and Food.
- Ann Beatrice Sparrow, Revenue Officer, Board of Inland Revenue.
- John Leonard Springer. For services to the Dearne Valley St. John Ambulance Brigade.
- Edmund Thomas Standing, Chief Petty Officer, Shell Marine Personnel (Isle of Man) Ltd.
- Marie Lawson Strong, lately Personal Assistant, Glasgow Battalion, Boys' Brigade.
- Elizabeth Clare Sutton, Office Keeper, Marlborough Street Magistrates Court.
- Arthur Derek Powell Tanner. For services to schoolboy rugby football.
- Cyril Aubrey Taylor. For services to the Pryford Branch, 1940 Dunkirk Veterans Association.
- Derek Taylor. For services to swimming in Staffordshire.
- Elizabeth Rose Taylor. Administrative Officer, Cabinet Office (Office of Public Service and Science).
- Joan Taylor, Support Grade Band 1 (Government Telephonist), Board of Inland Revenue.
- Malcolm Victor Taylor, Station Officer Retained, Essex County Fire Service.
- Ida May Teare. For services to the community in Colby, Isle of Man.
- Alan Roy Tebbit, Driver, Eastern National Bus Company.
- Derek Thompson, Postman and Driver, Liverpool, The Post Office, and for charitable services.
- Wilfred Alan Thompson, Craftsman, Joseph Sarginson Ltd.
- Elsie Todd. For services to the community in Hackness and Scarborough, North Yorkshire.
- Geraldine Susan Torrey. For services to the community in Heacham, Norfolk.
- William Henry Turner, Sub Officer, Dungiven, Fire Authority for Northern Ireland.
- Angela Vause, Personal Secretary, Lord Chancellor's Department.
- Gwendolen Wade. For charitable services to the blind.
- Frieda Hudsmith Walker. For services to the community in Hampshire.
- Josephine Walker, Secretary, Robinson & Sons Ltd.
- Norma Patricia Warrener, Administrative Officer, Department of Employment.
- Derek Frank Watton, Constable, Dorset Police and for services to the community in Portland.
- Clifford Leslie Weaver, Principal Degaussing Assistant, Ministry of Defence.
- Sydney Webster, lately Volunteer Observer, Meteorological Office.
- Gordon Robert Wells, Principal Officer, HM Prison Wandsworth.
- Vernon Arthur Werrett, Police Sergeant, Winfrith, United Kingdom Atomic Energy Authority Constabulary.
- Grace White, Personal Assistant to the Secretary, North West, Territorial Auxiliary and Volunteer Reserve Association.
- Rose Pamela White, Support Grade Band 1, Department of Health.
- William White, lately Maintenance Supervisor, St. Pancras Housing Association.
- Peter Ashby Whyte, Storekeeper, British Steel General Steels.
- Gwendolen Sybil Wilkinson. For services to the community in Co. Durham.
- John Elfed Williams, lately Rail Operator, Regional Railways, British Railways.
- Eric Gorrie Williamson, Service Control Manager, London Underground Ltd.
- Enid May Wilson, Typist, Ministry of Defence.
- Gwyneth Ellinor Marsden Winter. For services to the community in Shropshire.
- Michael Phillip Wise, Distribution Operative, Felixstowe, Anglian Water plc, and for services to nature conservation in Suffolk.
- Irene Henderson Wood, Administrative Officer, Regional Medical Service, Department of Social Security.
- Raymond Woodley, Personal Secretary, Department of the Environment.
- Philip Robert Woods, lately Clerk of Works, Surrey County Council.
- Victor John James Woods, lately Milk Roundsman, Dairy Crest.
- Anthony Paul Wright, Community Service Officer, Cheshire Probation Service.
- Arthur William Yeo, Head Porter, North Devon District Hospital.
- Jennifer Young, Revenue Personal Secretary, Board of Inland Revenue.

Overseas Territories

- Robert Balban. For community services in Gibraltar.
- John Chau Sinn-tsun, Senior Air Traffic Control Assistant, Civil Aviation Department, Hong Kong.
- Cheung Shui, Supervisor, Kowloon Region (Grade S111), Civil Aid Services, Hong Kong.
- Arthur John Garcia, Chief Clerk/Private Secretary, R. Cardona Ltd., Gibraltar.
- Kimmy Leung Chan Shuk-ying, Confidential Assistant, Hospital Services Department, Hong Kong.
- Lo Yui-cho, lately Senior Accounting Officer, Treasury Department, Hong Kong.
- Pang Kee-keung, Officer, Correctional Services Department, Hong Kong.
- Lucille Seymour. For services to Education and Sport in the Cayman Islands.
- Tung Shiu-biu, Senior Amenities Assistant, Urban Services Department, Hong Kong.

Bar to the British Empire Medal

- Kang Shik Ming, BEM, Laundryman. For laundry services to the Royal Navy.

=== Royal Red Cross (RRC) ===
- Lieutenant Colonel Maureen Olga Margaret Keating, TD, (474586), Queen Alexandra's Royal Army Nursing Corps, Territorial Army.
- Lieutenant Colonel Maureen Mavis Mumford-George (498098), Queen Alexandra's Royal Army Nursing Corps.
- Colonel Margaret Mary Slattery (484302), Queen Alexandra's Royal Army Nursing Corps.

==== Associate of the Royal Red Cross (ARRC) ====
- Major Francis Gilmour Hotting (499906), Queen Alexandra's Royal Army Nursing Corps.
- Captain Malcolm Eldridge (523474), Queen Alexandra's Royal Army Nursing Corps.
- Captain Tena Lynda McMachan (527627), Queen Alexandra's Royal Army Nursing Corps.
- Captain (Acting Major) Peter John Sokolow (516272), Queen Alexandra's Royal Army Nursing Corps.
- Flight Sergeant Robert Arthur Jones (L8099955), Royal Air Force.

=== Air Force Cross (AFC) ===
- Lieutenant Commander Colin Godfrey Hawksworth, Royal Navy.
- Squadron Leader John Francis Waddington (685795), Royal Air Force.

=== Queen's Police Medal (QPM) ===
England and Wales

- Brian Edward Baister, Assistant Chief Constable, Cheshire Constabulary.
- John Peter Bensley, Deputy Chief Constable, Lincolnshire Police.
- David Cecil Blakey, Chief Constable, West Mercia Police.
- Martin John Caple, Chief Superintendent, Leicestershire Constabulary.
- George Robinson Crawford, Chief Superintendent, Metropolitan Police.
- Neil Barrington Dickens, National Co-ordinator, Regional Crime Squads, NCIS.
- Ivor Anthony Jolly, Chief Superintendent, Greater Manchester Police.
- David Maldwyn Thomas Kendrick, Commander, Metropolitan Police.
- Daniel Leader, Sergeant, South Yorkshire Police.
- Peter John Mallott, Detective Sergeant, West Yorkshire Police.
- Alan Arthur Roberts, Chief Superintendent, Gwent Constabulary.
- David Thomas Rowley, Assistant Chief Constable, Staffordshire Police.
- Robert Wotherspoon Scott, Chief Superintendent, Cleveland Constabulary.
- Allan Sexton-Munns, Constable, Metropolitan Police.
- Laurence Christopher Sherwood, Detective Chief Superintendent, Cambridgeshire Constabulary.
- David Norman Stevens, Commander, Metropolitan Police.
- John Peter Westcott, Deputy Chief Constable, Sussex Police.
- Paul Chappie Whitehouse, Deputy Chief Constable, West Yorkshire Police.

Northern Ireland

- Hamilton Houston, Superintendent, Royal Ulster Constabulary.
- Robert Milton Whyte, Inspector, Royal Ulster Constabulary.

Scotland

- David Charles Gemmell Garbutt, Deputy Chief Constable, Grampian Police.
- Archibald Boyd McLaren, Assistant Chief Constable, Tayside Police.
- Ian Bryden Kerr, Detective Sergeant, Strathclyde Police.

Overseas

- Andrew Philip Bermingham, CPM, Detective Chief Superintendent, Royal Bermuda Police Force.
- Vincent Francis Derek Chapman, CPM, Chief Superintendent, Royal Hong Kong Police Force.
- Hector MacDonald Whitton, CPM, Assistant Commissioner, Royal Hong Kong Police Force.

=== Queen's Fire Services Medal (QFSM) ===
England And Wales

- Andrew Edward Best, Chief Officer, Merseyside Fire Brigade.
- Malcolm Eastwood, Chief Officer, Gloucestershire Fire Service.
- Terence Leslie Glossop, Chief Officer, Gwent Fire Brigade.
- Peter Anthony Gribbin, Chief Officer, Greater Manchester County Fire Service.
- James Gordon Russel, Chief Officer, Lancashire County Fire Brigade.
- Malcolm Alec Smith, Deputy Assistant Chief Officer, London Fire Brigade.
- Alan Wells, HM Inspector of Fire Service.
- David John Williams, Chief Officer, Mid Glamorgan Fire Service.

Overseas

- Chow Wing-cheong, CPM, Chief Fire Officer, Hong Kong Fire Service.

=== Colonial Police Medal (CPM) ===
- Chan Kwong-Ching, Superintendent (Ambulance), Hong Kong Fire Services.
- Chan Ping-kwong, Chief Superintendent (Auxiliary), Royal Hong Kong Auxiliary Police Force.
- Chiu Kwok-fan, Principal Ambulanceman, Hong Kong Fire Services.
- Fung Kwok-ping, Superintendent, Royal Hong Kong Police Force.
- Kwok Kwan-yung, Inspector, Royal Hong Kong Police Force.
- Clifford Lamburn, Chief Inspector, Royal Hong Kong Police Force.
- Lau King-wai, Chief Inspector, Royal Hong Kong Police Force.
- Li Yun-lam, Station Sergeant, Royal Hong Kong Police Force.
- Lo Chi-yung, Station Sergeant, Royal Hong Kong Police Force.
- Loong Kong-lok, Senior Divisional Officer, Hong Kong Fire Services.
- John Crichton Stuart McDouall, Superintendent, Royal Hong Kong Police Force.
- Gerard Anthony McStravick, Senior Superintendent, Royal Hong Kong Police Force.
- Ahmad Nazir, Station Sergeant, Royal Hong Kong Police Force.
- William Ian Nicholson, Chief Superintendent, Royal Hong Kong Police Force.
- Roger Joseph Sherratt, Chief Inspector, Royal Bermuda Police Force.
- Tam Kwok-fai, Station Sergeant, Royal Hong Kong Police Force.
- Tso Kwok-ming, Principal Fireman, Hong Kong Fire Services.
- Ross Crawford Williams, Senior Superintendent, Royal Hong Kong Police Force.
- Wong Fu-kwan, Station Sergeant, Royal Hong Kong Police Force.

=== Queen's Commendation for Valuable Service in the Air ===
Royal Navy

- Lieutenant Commander Iain Alistair Duncan Low.
- Lieutenant Commander Charles Exley Thornton.

Royal Air Force

- Squadron Leader Malcolm William Bertrand Bradford (0681982).
- Flight Lieutenant Stephen Harry Cockram (8028026).
- Squadron Leader Kenneth Ronald Denman (4163659), (Retired).
- Squadron Leader Michael John Branscombe Lawrance, MBE, (0607584).
- Master Aircrew Malcolm Rigby, BEM, (U1932804).
- Flight Lieutenant (now Squadron Leader) Guy Gerard Riley (8027415).
- Squadron Leader John Rudin (4230920).
- Squadron Leader Christopher David Stevens (0608798).
- Squadron Leader David Walby (4233030).

United Kingdom

- Norman Grove, Chief Test Pilot, Slingsby Aviation Limited.

== Cook Islands ==
=== Member of the Order of the British Empire (MBE) ===
Civil Division

- Pauline Margaret Rakera George Karika (Makea Karika Ariki). For services to the House of Arikis and the community.

=== British Empire Medal (BEM) ===
Civil Division

- Ioane Kaitara Toto. For services to pearl farming.

== Bahamas ==
=== Order of Saint Michael and Saint George ===
==== Knight Commander of the Order of St Michael and St George (KCMG) ====
- Kendal George Lamon Isaacs, CBE, QC. For public services.

== Grenada ==
=== Order of the British Empire ===
==== Officer of the Order of the British Empire (OBE) ====
Civil Division

- Reynold Lewis Francis Benjamin. For services to agriculture.

=== British Empire Medal (BEM) ===
Civil Division

- Andrew Martin Frank. For services to farming.
- Desmond Martin. For services to fishing.
- Simpson Matthew Theodore. For services to small manufacturing.

== Solomon Islands ==
=== Order of the British Empire ===
==== Officer of the Order of the British Empire (OBE) ====
Civil Division

- Paul Joseph Tovua. For political services.
- Wilson Vuria. For public services to agriculture.

==== Member of the Order of the British Empire (MBE) ====
Civil Division

- Catherine Saloa Anilafa. For public service in teaching disabled children.
- Charles Luiramo. For public services to nursing.
- Zachariah Qaina. For public services to nursing.
- Vincent Chee Quan. For services to commerce.
- Shem Yei. For public services to teaching.

=== British Empire Medal (BEM) ===
Civil Division

- Bartholomew Bonie. For services to the Anglican Church, the community and commerce.
- William Dagi Kailo. For services to the community.
- Reuben Manepahethe. For services to the law and the community.
- Nelson Menamapa. For services to the community.

== Tuvalu ==
=== Order of the British Empire ===
==== Officer of the Order of the British Empire (OBE) ====
Civil Division

- The Honourable Naama Maheu Latasi. For public and community services.

==== Member of the Order of the British Empire (MBE) ====
Civil Division

- Ilaoa Imo. For public and community services.
- Captain Paueli Sione. For public services.

=== British Empire Medal (BEM) ===
Civil Division

- Foe Apinelu. For public services.
- Sopoaga Enele. For public and community services.
- Peia Fagalele. For public services.
- Vavae Katalake. For services to business and the community.
- Tealo Kivao. For public and community services.
- Sualiki Neemia. For public and community services.
- Manao Nukulasi. For public services.
- Falaile Pilitati. For public and community services.
- Litagi Sueina. For public and community services.
- Taloka Talaga. For public and community services.
- Tiifi Vaega. For public and community services.

== Saint Vincent and the Grenadines ==
=== Order of the British Empire ===
==== Officer of the Order of the British Empire (OBE) ====
Civil Division

- Norma Elresa Keizer. For services to education.
- Judith Althea Leigertwood. For public service.

==== Member of the Order of the British Empire (MBE) ====
Civil Division

- Walter Hinton Bynoe. For community service.
- Nathaniel Jeremiah Guy. For community service.
- Isola Mcintosh. For community service.

== Belize ==
=== Order of the British Empire ===
==== Commander of the Order of the British Empire (CBE) ====
Civil Division

- Edwin Lenton Flowers. For public service.

==== Officer of the Order of the British Empire (OBE) ====
Civil Division

- Rudolph Winston Benjamin Anderson, JP. For contribution to building operations.
- Rafael Novelo, Sr. For services to the community.

==== Member of the Order of the British Empire (MBE) ====
Civil Division

- Leslie Montague Browne. For services to industry and commerce.
- Denbergh Edison Coleman, LVO. For contribution to broadcasting.
- Herbert Thwaites Masson. For services to industry and commerce.
- Callola Pinto Prince. For services to the community.
