= Jennie Wheatley =

British writer and historian

Jennie N. Wheatley MBE (24 June 1939 – 5 October 2023) was a writer and historian from the British Virgin Islands. A long-standing member of the country's intellectual community, she worked to preserve and share the islands' history and culture.

== Early life and education ==
Wheatley was born Jennie Naomi Smith in 1939 in Tortola, British Virgin Islands.

After high school, she attended the Leeward Islands Teachers Training College in Antigua, where she graduated in 1960. She returned to Tortola and worked as a schoolteacher there before traveling to Canada, where she studied at Mount Allison University, an institution that actively recruited students from the British Virgin Islands during this period. She graduated with bachelor's degrees in English and education in 1970.

== Career ==
=== Education ===
On her return to the British Virgin Islands, Wheatley resumed her work as a primary and secondary school teacher. In 1981, she traveled to England, where she received further training in education at the University of Leeds.

In the 1990s, Wheatley began lecturing at H. Lavity Stoutt Community College, the first school of higher education based in the British Virgin Islands. She also served on the college's Board of Governors from its founding in 1990 and helped establish its Virgin Island Studies Program in 1999.

She has worked with the Caribbean Examinations Council to develop standardized test questions, serving on its English Panel.

Wheatley was named a member of the Order of the British Empire in the 1993 New Year Honours for her work in education. In 2011, she was honored again by then-Governor Boyd McCleary for her contributions to education in the country.

=== Writing ===
In the early 1970s, Wheatley worked with her students to collect local proverbs and sayings, which she then compiled in her first book, Bohog Put in Gol' Teet': Proverbs and Pearls of Wisdom, in 1974.

After her experience working on Bohog Put in Gol' Teet', Wheatley decided to work on a collection of stories about a Caribbean child named Boysie, which borrowed from the islands' folk culture. It was published by UNESCO in 1984 under the title Boysie and the Genips, and Other Stories. A sequel, Pass It On!, was published in 1991.

She published four children's books in 2005 and 2006: Danielle’s Trunk, Ariana likes to Read, Who Is the Best in the Garden?, and Timmy Turtle Runs Away, all of which take place in the British Virgin Islands.

In 2009, she released her first poetry collection, Along the Road. Her final book, Pass It On: A Treasury of Virgin Islands Folk Remedies, was published in 2022.

=== History ===
Wheatley was extensively involved in preserving the history of the islands. She co-wrote with Eileene L. Parsons the seminal history text 150 Years of Achievement: 1834 – 1984, which was first published in 1984 and revised in 2016.

She also engaged in extensive oral history work, particularly with older residents of the island and emigres. She recorded traditional practices, folk tales, idioms, and other aspects of British Virgin Islands culture. In 2013 she published Struggles and Triumphs, a history of the British Virgin Islands that relies on these interviews.

Her work to preserve the islands' history extended to its landmarks. Around the turn of the century, she became involved in restoring historic sites on the islands as part of the Millennium Committee.

=== Other ===
In 2020, Wheatley was appointed to the British Virgin Islands Tourist Board.

== Personal life and death ==
She and her husband, Charles Wheatley, had three sons, Ludwis, Lloyd, and Leon. Ludwis, better known as L. Allen, served as the islands' financial secretary.

Wheatley died in 2023 at the age of 84.

== Selected works ==
- Bohog Put in Gol' Teet': Proverbs and Pearls of Wisdom (1974)
- Boysie and The Genips and Other Stories (1984)
- 150 Years of Achievement: 1834 – 1984 (with Eileene L. Parsons, 1984; second edition in 2016)
- Pass It On !!! A Treasury of Virgin Island Tales (1991)
- Pass It On! A Treasury of Virgin Islands Tales (House of Nehesi Publishers, 1996, ISBN 0-913441-26-0)
- Along the Road (2009)
- Struggles and Triumphs (2013)
- Pass It On: A Treasury of Virgin Islands Folk Remedies (2022)
