= Raymond Johnstone =

Scottish public official (1929–2022)

Sir John Raymond Johnstone CBE (27 October 1929 – 15 August 2022) was a Scottish accountant, investment manager and public official.

Born on 27 October 1929, Johnstone was the son of Captain Henry James Johnston, RN (1895–1947) and (Alison, née McIntyre).

He studied at Trinity College, Cambridge, and trained as an accountant in Edinburgh from 1951 to 1954, before working in London until 1959; he was made a partner of Brown Fleming and Murray in 1959, and then became managing director of the investment management company Murray Johnstone in 1968, serving until 1989. He was also Murray Johnstone's chairman from 1984 to 1994 and then its president until 1997.

Alongside these positions, Johnstone was chairman of the Forestry Commission from 1989 to 1994 and of the Historic Buildings Council for Scotland from 1995 to 2000. He was appointed a Commander of the Order of the British Empire (CBE) in the 1988 New Year Honours and was knighted in the 1993 New Year Honours for "public service in Scotland".

Johnstone died in Edinburgh on 15 August 2022, at the age of 92.
