= Louis Hellman =

British architect and cartoonist

Louis Hellman MBE (born 1936) is a British architect and cartoonist. He is particularly known for his cartoons from the world of architecture and his Archi-têtes drawings, in which he caricatured architects by drawing them in the style of their buildings. His drawings and illustrations have been published in numerous newspapers and magazines since 1967.

== Life ==
Hellman studied architecture at the "Bartlett School of Architecture" of University College London and at the École des Beaux-Arts in Paris. He is a member of the Royal Institute of British Architects. In 1993 he was made a Member of the Order of the British Empire (MBE).

== Exhibitions ==
- 1979 Architectural Association (AA), United Kingdom
- 1991, 1993: Interbuild, United Kingdom
- 1996: Cambridge, United Kingdom
- 2000: Soane-Museum
- 2001: Barcelona, Spain

== Publications ==
- Architecture A to Z. A Rough Guide. Wiley, Chichester, 2001 ISBN 978-0-471-48957-3 .
- Architecture for Beginners. Rowohlt paperback publisher, Reinbek, 1988, ISBN 978-3-499-17551-0
- Archi-têtes The ID in the Grid. Wiley, Chichester, 2000 ISBN 978-0-471-98860-1 .
- 'All Hellman breaks loose'
