= Marion Conacher =

Missionary nurse (1933–2021)

Marion Conacher MBE
- with Kairi the tiger
- Born: 2 July 1933; Edinburgh
- Died: 8 October 2021 (aged 88)
- Education: Princess Royal Maternity Hospital
- Occupation: Missionary nurse
- Known for: Community nursing in India

Marion Nelson Conacher (2 July 1933 - 8 October 2021) was a missionary nurse who worked in rural India, working in community hospitals and nurse training establishments for more than a half century. As a young nurse, she survived a poisoning attempt by a jealous rival, and went on to receive an MBE for nursing and welfare services to the community in Madhya Pradesh, India.

== Early life and education ==
Conacher was born in Edinburgh in 1933, where her parents, Torrance and Gertrude Conacher, were involved with the Holyrood Abbey Church. She attended James Gillespie High School for Girls, and having initially been rejected for nurses training at Edinburgh Royal Infirmary, she worked as a secretary for solicitors Nightingale and Bell in Edinburgh. She spent a couple of years working for the Development Corporation of Israel, in Worcester, Massachusetts, before coming back to Scotland, where she trained as a midwife at the Princess Royal Maternity Hospital (nicknamed 'The Rotten Row') in Glasgow.

== Career ==
She moved to India in 1963, first working at the Bamdah Eye Clinic in Bihar, on the border of Nepal, and later at a larger dispensary in Pokharia, Bihar. During this period she learnt Hindi, and the local language Santali. In 1975 she moved to the Evangelical Mission Hospital in Tilda, now Chhattisgarh, formerly part of Madhya Pradesh. There she was seen as a rival by an unqualified local woman, who was caught poisoning her food. Conacher went on to administer and enhance the School of Nursing, and associated nursing services for the next 18 years. She also worked with the Mid India Board of Examiners of Nursing.

Conacher earned an MBE in the 1993 New Year's Honours list, acknowledging 30 years service to the Evangelical Mission Hospital in Chhattisgarh, central India. Her family dedicated a new portico at the St. Thoma Church, Tilda 'to mark her Christian service' to the hospital and the church. That year she retired from her work in India, but took on further activities including the establishment of a clinic in Tanzania and a mission to Chennai on behalf of the Church of Scotland World Mission, to assess the potential of a Church of South India Rainy Nursing School. Based in Edinburgh, she joined the team cataloguing a new library at the Rutherford House research and study centre, and helped reorganise the library of the Delhi Bible Institute, often traveling to India from 2003 to 2015. Having been a missionary partner of the Wardie Church, Edinburgh, she encouraged the church to support the Evangelical Mission Hospital in Tilda, where Conacher opened a new female ward in 2012. A brass plaque hangs in Wardie Church from the hospital in gratitude to both Conacher and Wardie.

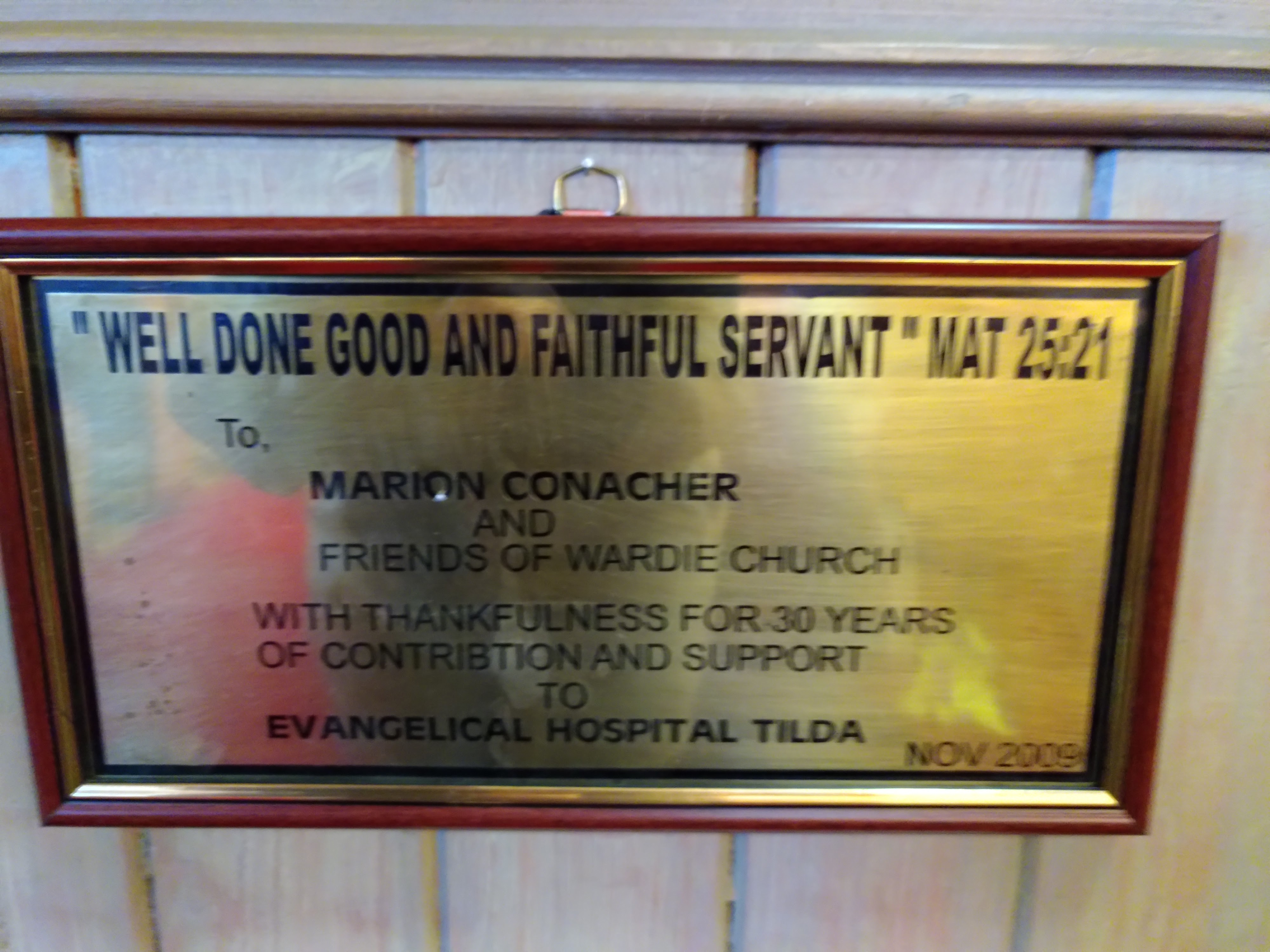
Plaque to Marion Conacher and Wardie Church

Conacher died in Edinburgh in 2021, aged 88,
