= Civil Service Commission (United Kingdom) =

UK government body

The Civil Service Commission regulates recruitment to the United Kingdom Civil Service, providing assurance that appointments are on merit after fair and open competition, and hears appeals under the Civil Service Code. The commission is independent of government and the Civil Service. The Civil Service Commission was established by Gladstone through an order in council on 21 May 1855 following the publication of the Northcote–Trevelyan Report by Charles Trevelyan and Stafford Northcote that advocated the decoupling of appointments of senior civil servants from ministers to ensure the impartiality of the Civil Service.

Following a report of the Committee on Standards in Public Life, "Defining the Boundaries within the Executive: Ministers, special advisers and the permanent Civil Service" in 2003, the appointment of the First Civil Service Commissioner is made by Government after consultation with the leaders of the main opposition parties. They are then appointed by the King under royal prerogative. The First Civil Service Commissioner is appointed for a fixed term of five years, although another commissioner may act as an interim First Commissioner when necessary.

== Civil Service Code ==
The Civil Service Code is a set of regulations which govern the conduct of civil servants in the UK. The regulations are broadly based on the Seven Principles of Public Life. First introduced in 2006 and later updated in 2015, the code sets out the four main principles which civil servants are expected to demonstrate: integrity, honesty, objectivity and impartiality.

The code applies to all civil servants, whether employed on a permanent basis or otherwise, but not agency workers, consultants, contractors or staff employed in the wider public sector.

== List of First Civil Service Commissioners ==
- Sir Edward Ryan (1855–75)
- John Pakington, 1st Baron Hampton (1875–1880)
- George Byng, Viscount Enfield (later 3rd Earl of Strafford) (1880–88)
- ...
- William Courthope (1892–1907)
- Lord Francis Hervey (1907-1909)
- Sir Stanley Leathes (1910–1927)
- Sir Roderick Meiklejohn(1927–1939)
- Sir Percival Waterfield (1939–1951)
- Sir Paul Sinker (1951–1954)
- Laurence Helsby, Baron Helsby (1954–1959)
- Sir George Mallaby (1959–1964)
- Sir George Abell (1964-1967)
- John Hunt (1967–1971)
- K. H. Clucas (1971–1974)
- Fergus Allen (1974–1981)
- Angus Fraser (1981–1983)
- Dennis Trevelyan (1983–1989)
- John Holroyd (1989–1993)
- Dame Ann Bowtell (1993–1995)
- Sir Michael Bett (1995–2000)
- Usha Prashar, Baroness Prashar (2000–2005)
- Janet Paraskeva (2006–2010)
- Mark Addison (2011) (Interim)
- Sir David Normington (2011–2016)
- Kathryn Bishop (2016) (Interim)
- Ian Watmore (2016–2021)
- Rosie Glazebrook (2021) (Interim)
- Gisela Stuart, Baroness Stuart of Edgbaston (2022–present)
