= Matilda Leathes =

British novelist

Matilda Leathes, née Butt (1830-1922) was a British novelist. She also published as Mrs. Stanley Leathes.

== Life ==
Matilda Butt was born in 1830 in Swansea. She was the daughter of John Martin Butt, rector of East Garston in Berkshire, and a niece of the novelist Mary Martha Sherwood. On 6 July 1858 she married the Hebrew scholar Stanley Leathes. Their children included Stanley Mordaunt Leathes and John Beresford Leathes.

She died on 17 November 1922 at Box, Wiltshire.

== Works ==
- Ruth Levison. London: Joseph Masters, 1860.
- (as the author of 'Ruth Levison') Charity at home. A tale. London: Joseph Masters, 1863.
- Soimême: a story of a wilful life. London: Rivingtons, 1869.
- Penelope: or, Morning clouds dispersed. London: Hodder and Stoughton, 1873.
- (as the author of 'Letty Deane') Our village worthies: or, Stories of village life. London: S.P.C.K., 1876.
- The girls of Bredon, and Manor House stories. London: S.P.C.K., 1877.
- On the doorsteps, or, Crispin's story. London: J. F. Shaw, 1880.
- All among the daisies. London: J. F. Shaw, 1881.
- Jack and Jill of our own day. London: J. F. Shaw & Co., 1882. Illustrated by Madeleine Erwin.
- Ingle-nook stories. London: J. F. Shaw & Co., 1883. Illustrated by Madeleine Erwin.
- The caged linnet: or, Love's labour not lost. London: J. F. Shaw, 1883.
- Other lives than ours : fables in prose. London: J. F. Shaw, 1884.
- Afloat: a story. London: J. F. Shaw, 1886
- Over the hills and far away. London: J. F. Shaw, 1887.
- To-morrow : a story. London: J. F. Shaw, 1887.
- Dody and Joss, or, All's well that ends well. London, 1889.
- Holidays in Summer and Winter. London: Shaw & Co., 1890.
- Miss Limpett's lodgers. London : Religious Tract Society, 1895. Penny tales for the people, no. 87.
- Zetty Craig, or, no cross no crown . Edinburgh: Nelson and Sons, 1898.
