= Commissioner for Public Appointments for Northern Ireland =

Public servant in Northern Ireland

The Commissioner for Public Appointments for Northern Ireland (CPANI) is a public servant appointed by the First Minister and deputy First Minister of Northern Ireland, whose primary role is to provide independent assurance that ministerial public appointments across Northern Ireland by Northern Ireland Executive Ministers.

There are similar bodies for two other jurisdictions of the United Kingdom – the Commissioner for Ethical Standards in Public Life in Scotland and the Office of the Commissioner for Public Appointments for England and Wales.

== List of Commissioners for Public Appointments for Northern Ireland ==
The role of Commissioner for Public Appointments in Northern Ireland was established in 1995. Initially, the position was combined with the Commissioner for Public Appointments in Great Britain, before a separate Northern Ireland Commissioner was appointed in 2005.

| Commissioner | Term start | Term end | Notes |
|---|---|---|---|
| Sir Len Peach | 18 December 1995 | 30 November 1999 | First NI Commissioner; covered both Great Britain and Northern Ireland. |
| Dame Rennie Fritchie DBE (later Baroness Fritchie) | 1 December 1999 | 2005 | Continued to cover NI alongside GB until a separate NI-only commissioner was created. |
| Felicity Huston | 2005 | 2011 | First separately appointed NI-only Commissioner. |
| John Keanie | August 2011 | 31 August 2015 | Five-year non-renewable term. |
| Judena Leslie | 1 September 2015 | May 2021 | Served until early May 2021; term extended in 2020 to deal with increased workload. |
| Claire Keatinge | 22 August 2025 | Incumbent | Appointed for a five-year term. |

After May 2021 the post remained vacant until the appointment of Claire Keatinge in August 2025.
