= Non-departmental public body =

UK public sector organisation

In the United Kingdom, non-departmental public body (NDPB) is a classification applied by the Cabinet Office, Treasury, the Scottish Government, and the Northern Ireland Executive to public sector organisations that have a role in the process of national government but are not part of a government department. NDPBs carry out their work largely independently from ministers and are accountable to the public through Parliament; however, ministers are responsible for the independence, effectiveness, and efficiency of non-departmental public bodies in their portfolio.

The term includes the four types of NDPB (executive, advisory, tribunal, and independent monitoring boards) but excludes public corporations and public broadcasters (BBC, Channel 4, and S4C).

== Types of body ==
The UK Government classifies bodies into four main types. The Scottish Government also has a fifth category: NHS bodies.

=== Advisory NDPBs ===
These bodies consist of boards which advise ministers on particular policy areas. They are often supported by a small secretariat from the parent department, and any expenditure is paid for by that department.

=== Executive NDPBs ===
These bodies usually deliver a particular public service and are overseen by a board rather than ministers. Appointments are made by ministers following the Code of Practice of the Commissioner for Public Appointments. They employ their own staff and allocate their own budgets.

=== Tribunal NDPBs ===
These bodies have jurisdiction over an area of the law. They are coordinated by His Majesty's Courts and Tribunals Service, an executive agency of the Ministry of Justice, and supervised by the Administrative Justice and Tribunals Council, itself an NDPB sponsored by the Ministry of Justice.

=== Independent monitoring boards ===
These bodies were formerly known as "boards of visitors" and are responsible for the state of prisons, their administration, and the treatment of prisoners. The Home Office is responsible for their costs and has to note all expenses.

== Contrast with executive agencies, non-ministerial departments and quangos ==
NDPB differ from executive agencies as they are not created to carry out ministerial orders or policy, instead they are more or less self-determining and enjoy greater independence. They are also not directly part of government like a non-ministerial government department being at a remove from both ministers and any elected assembly or parliament. Typically an NDPB would be established under statute and be accountable to Parliament rather than to His Majesty's Government. This arrangement allows more financial independence since the government is obliged to provide funding to meet statutory obligations.

NDPBs are sometimes referred to as quangos. However, this term originally referred to quasi-NGOs bodies that are, at least ostensibly, non-government organisations, but nonetheless perform governmental functions. The backronym "quasi-autonomous national government organization" is used in this usage which is normally pejorative.

== History, numbers and powers ==
In March 2009 there were nearly 800 public bodies that were sponsored by the UK Government. This total included 198 executive NDPBs, 410 advisory bodies, 33 tribunals, 21 public corporations, the Bank of England, 2 public broadcasting authorities and 23 NHS bodies. However, the classification is conservative and does not include bodies that are the responsibility of devolved government, various lower tier boards (including a considerable number within the NHS), and also other boards operating in the public sector (e.g. school governors and police authorities).

These appointed bodies performed a large variety of tasks, for example health trusts, or the Welsh Development Agency, and by 1992 were responsible for some 25% of all government expenditure in the UK. According to the Cabinet Office their total expenditure for the financial year 2005–06 was £167 billion.

As of March 2020, there were 237 non-departmental public bodies.

== Criticism ==
Critics argued that the system was open to abuse as most NDPBs had their members directly appointed by government ministers without an election or consultation with the people. The press, critical of what was perceived as the Conservatives' complacency in power in the 1990s, presented much material interpreted as evidence of questionable government practices.

This concern led to the formation of a Committee on Standards in Public Life (the Nolan Committee) which first reported in 1995 and recommended the creation of a "public appointments commissioner" to make sure that appropriate standards were met in the appointment of members of NDPBs. The Government accepted the recommendation, and the Office of the Commissioner for Public Appointments was established in November 1995.

While in opposition, the Labour Party promised to reduce the number and power of NDPBs. The use of NDPBs continued under the Labour government in office from 1997 to 2010, though the political controversy associated with NDPBs in the mid-1990s for the most part died away.

In 2010 the UK's Conservative-Liberal coalition published a review of NDPBs recommending closure or merger of nearly two hundred bodies, and the transfer of others to the private sector. This process was colloquially termed the "bonfire of the quangos".

== Classification in national accounts ==
NDPBs are classified under code S.13112 of the European System of Accounts (ESA.95). However, Statistics UK does not break out the detail for these bodies and they are consolidated into General Government (S.1311).

== See also ==
- Executive agency
- Non-ministerial government department
- Quango
- Regulatory agency
- Scottish public bodies
- Statutory agency
- Statutory corporation
- Welsh Government sponsored bodies
