= Mallaby =

Mallaby is a surname. Notable people with the surname include:

- Aubertin Walter Sothern Mallaby (1899–1945), British Indian Army officer
- Christopher Mallaby (1936–2022), British diplomat
- George Mallaby (disambiguation), multiple people
- Sebastian Mallaby (born 1964), English journalist and writer

== See also ==
- Harry Mallaby-Deeley (1863–1937), British politician
