= Fritchie =

Fritchie is a surname. Notable people with the surname include:

- Barbara Fritchie (1766–1862), Unionist folk figure during the American Civil War
- Rennie Fritchie, Baroness Fritchie (1942–2026), British life peer

== See also ==
- Barbara Fritchie Stakes
