= James Cope =

James Cope may refer to:

- Jim Cope (1907–1999), Australian politician
- James Cope (cricketer) (born 1966), English schoolteacher and cricketer
- James Cope (UK politician) (c. 1709–1756), British Member of Parliament and political envoy
