= List of honorary fellows of St Hilda's College, Oxford =

This is a list of current and past Honorary Fellows of St Hilda's College, Oxford.

- Mildred Archer
- Mary Bennett
- Marilyn Butler
- Elizabeth Butler-Sloss, Baroness Butler-Sloss
- Fiona Caldicott
- Lorna Casselton
- Catherine Cookson
- Jacqueline du Pré
- Lucy Faithfull, Baroness Faithfull
- Janet Gaymer
- Susan Greenfield
- P. D. James
- Gwyneth Jones
- Elizabeth Topham Kennan
- Hermione Lee
- Nicola LeFanu
- Mary Lefkowitz
- Toni Morrison
- Gillian Shephard
- Rosalyn Tureck

== See also ==
- Category:Alumni of St Hilda's College, Oxford
- Category:Fellows of St Hilda's College, Oxford
