= Robert Gittings =

Robert William Victor Gittings CBE (1 February 1911 – 18 February 1992), was an English writer, biographer, BBC Radio producer, playwright and poet. In 1978, he was awarded the James Tait Black Memorial Prize for The Older Hardy.

== Early life ==
Born at Southsea, the son of Surgeon-Captain Fred Claude Bromley Gittings and his wife Dora Mary, née Brayshaw, the young Gittings was educated at St Edward's School, Oxford, where he was taught by George Mallaby, and Jesus College, Cambridge, where he arrived in 1930 with a scholarship, gaining a First in 1933. He later wrote the article on George Mallaby in the Oxford Dictionary of National Biography.

While still at school he published poems and thus encountered Christopher Fry, a lifelong friend. At the University of Cambridge, he was encouraged by Sir Arthur Quiller-Couch, editor of the Oxford Book of English Verse, whose rooms in college were near his, and in 1931 he was awarded the Chancellor's gold medal for English verse.

== Career ==
In 1933, Gittings was elected a research fellow of Jesus College and became a history supervisor in 1938.

In 1940. he took a job with BBC Radio as a producer and writer, remaining with the Corporation twenty-three years. He made broadcasts for schools, dramatizations of history and literary programmes, and contributed to radio programmes such as Poets and Poetry, World History Series, Poetry Now, and The World of Books.

He continued to write verse, and his first major book, Wentworth Place (1950), was well reviewed. History and poetry combined in him into the ability to bring the past to life. In all, he published twelve volumes of poetry.

In 1954, his biography John Keats: the Living Year was published, to be followed in 1956 by The Mask of Keats, and in 1960 by Shakespeare's Rival. He left the BBC in 1964. His John Keats (1969) was awarded the WH Smith Literary Award, and he also wrote scholarly studies of Thomas Hardy: The Young Thomas Hardy (1975), The Older Hardy (1978, awarded the James Tait Black Memorial Prize) and (with his wife, Jo Manton) The Second Mrs Hardy (1979).

As a playwright, Gittings naturally specialized in radio drama, but he also wrote plays for Women's Institutes, This Tower my Prison (1961) and Conflict at Canterbury (1970) for the Canterbury Festival. Introducing Thomas Hardy, a double act with Frances Horovitz, was performed from 1971 until 1978, when Horovitz died.

With Jo Manton, he wrote Dorothy Wordsworth (1985) and the same year published his last book of verse, People, Places, Personal. His last book, Claire Clairmont and the Shelleys, was printed a few days before his death.

== Private life ==
In 1934, Gittings married Katherine Edith Cambell, a Cambridge contemporary who had been at Girton College and was known as Kay, and they had two sons, called Robert and John, together, but this marriage ended in divorce. In 1949, he married secondly Joan Greville Manton, called Jo, who was a BBC colleague and also a biographer. They had one daughter.

A tall man, Gittings had a high forehead and bald head, a warm personality and a fine sense of humour. He played several sports, including cricket, squash, real tennis, and golf, and was still playing cricket in his seventies.

He died at Chichester on 18 February 1992, and was cremated.

== Honours ==
- Commander of the Order of the British Empire, 1970.
- Honorary DLitt, University of Cambridge, 1970.
- Honorary fellow of Jesus College, Cambridge, 1979.
- Honorary LittD, University of Leeds, 1981.

== Selected publications ==
- Wentworth Place (1950),
- John Keats: The Living Year, 21 September 1818 to 21 September 1819 (London: Heinemann, 1954)
- The Mask of Keats (1956)
- Shakespeare's Rival (1960)
- This Tower my Prison (1961)
- The Keats Inheritance (1964)
- John Keats (1969)
- Conflict at Canterbury (1970)
- American Journey: Twenty-five sonnets (1972)
- The Young Thomas Hardy (1975)
- The Older Hardy (1978)
- (with Jo Manton) The Second Mrs Hardy (1979)
- (with Jo Manton) Dorothy Wordsworth (Clarendon Press, 1985, ISBN 0-19-818519-7)
- People, Places, Personal (1985)
- Claire Clairmont and the Shelleys (Oxford: Oxford University Press, 1992, ISBN 0-19-818594-4)
