= Stanley Leathes =

English theologian and orientalist (1830–1900)

Stanley Leathes (21 March 1830 – 30 April 1900) was an English theologian and Orientalist.

== Biography ==
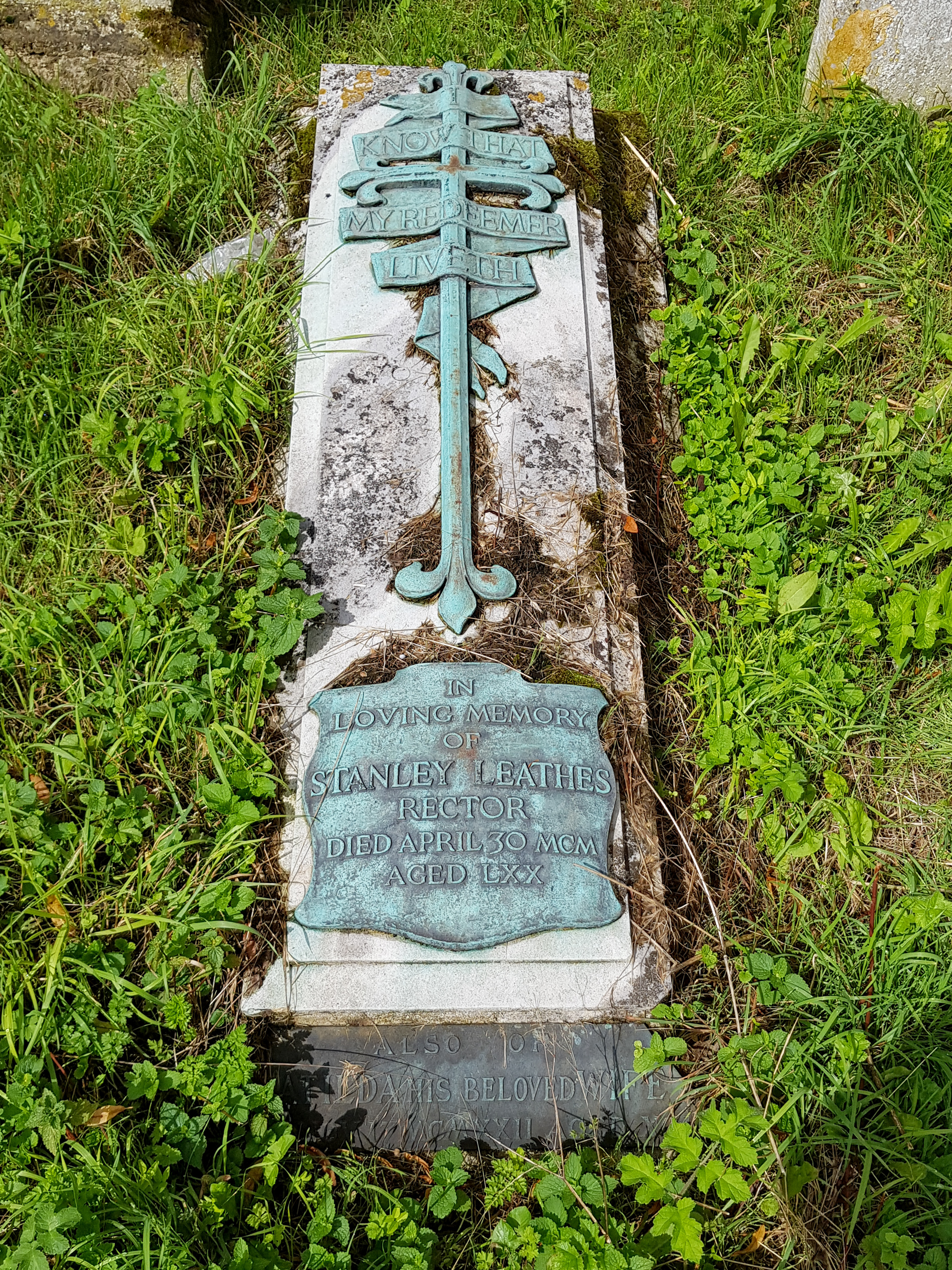
Grave of Stanley Leathes in the churchyard of St. Andrew's, Much Hadham, where Leathes was rector from 1889

He was born at Ellesborough, Buckinghamshire, the son of the Rev. Chaloner Stanley Leathes, and was educated at Jesus College, Cambridge, where he graduated B.A. in 1852, M.A. 1853. In 1853 he was awarded a Tyrwhitt's Hebrew scholarship. He was ordained priest in 1857, and after serving several curacies was appointed professor of Hebrew at King's College London, in 1863. In 1868–1870 he was Boyle lecturer ("The Witness of the Old Testament to Christ"), in 1873 Hulsean lecturer ("The Gospel its Own Witness"), in 1874 Bampton Lecturer ("The Religion of the Christ") and from 1876 to 1880 Warburtonian lecturer.

He was a member of the Old Testament revision committee from 1870 to 1885. In 1876 he was elected prebendary of St Paul's Cathedral, and he was rector of Cliffe-at-Hoo near Gravesend (1880–1889) and of Much Hadham, Hertfordshire (1889–1900). The University of Edinburgh gave him the honorary degree of DD in 1878, and his own college made him an honorary Fellow in 1885. Besides the lectures noted he published Studies in Genesis (1880), The Foundations of Morality (1882) and some volumes of sermons.

== Family ==
He married Matilda Butt.

His son, Stanley Mordaunt Leathes, became a Fellow of Trinity, Cambridge, and lecturer on history, and was one of the editors of the Cambridge Modern History; he was secretary to the Civil Service Commission from 1903 to 1907, when he was appointed a Civil Service Commissioner.

His second son, John Beresford Leathes, a distinguished physiologist, was elected a Fellow of the Royal Society of London in 1911.
