= Appointment of Church of England bishops =

Selection and installation process of bishops in the Church of England

The appointment of Church of England diocesan bishops follows a detailed process, reflecting the church's traditional tendency towards compromise and complex solutions, traditional ambiguity between hierarchy and democracy, and traditional role as a semi-autonomous state church. (Suffragan bishops are appointed through a much simpler process, reflecting their status as directly responsible to their diocesan bishop.)

== Procedures ==
A flowchart showing the process of the appointment of Church of England bishops

Since 1976, when a diocesan bishop (including those of the 42 English dioceses and the bishop of Sodor and Man but not the bishop in Europe) dies, retires or moves on and leaves a diocesan bishopric vacant, the process of replacing them involves several stages. The first of these involves the diocesan Vacancy-in-See Committee, composed of:

- The dean of the diocese's cathedral
- Two archdeacons
- The diocese's representative members of the General Synod of the Church of England
- Members of the diocesan House of Bishops
- The chairman and two other members of the diocesan House of Clergy
- The chairman and two other members of the diocesan House of Laity
- Other members approved by the Bishop's Council

The committee produces a "Statement of Needs" assessing the needs of the diocese. It then sends this statement to the Crown Nominations Commission (known until 2003 as the Crown Appointments Commission), which consists of:

- The archbishops of Canterbury and York (in the event of a vacancy in either post, then the House of Bishops elects another bishop to take that archbishop's place)
- Three members elected by the General Synod's House of Clergy from within itself
- Three members elected by the General Synod's House of Laity from itself
- Six members elected ad hoc by the Vacancy-in-See Committee from itself

Beyond these fourteen voting members, the prime minister's appointments secretary and the archbishops' appointments secretary meet with the commission and help supply it with information on possible candidates. Normally the archbishop in whose province the vacancy lies chairs the commission.

When meeting to nominate an archbishop, the commission is chaired by a fifteenth voting member, who must be an "actual communicant lay member of the Church of England". The fifteenth voting member is appointed by the prime minister (if an archbishop of Canterbury is being appointed) or by the Church of England Appointments Committee (if an Archbishop of York).

The commission meets several times in secret. The commission then forwards two names to the prime minister, who chooses one of them, or (exceptionally) requests additional names from the commission. In recent memory, the only prime minister who has not accepted the commission's preferred candidate was Margaret Thatcher, who opposed Jim Thompson’s nomination as Bishop of Birmingham, due to his (perceived) liberal and left-leaning views. Since 2007 the convention has been that the prime minister will choose the first-named recommendation. If the chosen individual accepts the office, the prime minister advises the Sovereign, who then formally nominates the prime minister's choice. The sovereign issues a congé d'élire, a licence permitting the College of Canons of the diocese to meet to elect the new bishop, and with it, a Letter Missive informing them of who they are to elect. Thereafter, the canons meets to 'elect' the new bishop.

Following the election, the new bishop must be confirmed in office (called the "confirmation of election"). A provincial ceremony takes place where the bishop-elect swears an oath. During the ceremony, the appropriate archbishop confers the spiritualities of the see on the bishop-elect, who then takes office (i.e. it is the confirmation by which the person legally takes up the See and become bishop, and thereby vacates their previous ecclesiastical office). At a later point, the monarch confers the temporalities of the see, which formerly included vast church estates and the bishop's residence, but which have now become more limited. If the bishop has never previously received consecration as a bishop, they must be consecrated; both the confirmation of election and episcopal consecration (if any) generally take place to suit the archbishop's convenience and always on a Principal Feast or Festival of the Church year. Episcopal consecrations normally happen in York Minster for a bishop of the northern province, or, for a bishop of the southern province, in Canterbury Cathedral or one of the great churches or cathedrals in London (such as St Paul's or Southwark Cathedral), or Westminster Abbey.

Finally, a symbolic ceremony of installation or enthronement takes place in the bishop's new cathedral, during which they are welcomed by their new diocese and first sits in their cathedra.

=== Roman Catholic prime ministers ===
The Roman Catholic Relief Act 1829 provides that "any person professing the Roman Catholic religion" may not "directly or indirectly to advise his Majesty ... touching or concerning the appointment to or disposal of any office or preferment in the Church of England, or in the Church of Scotland". This means that where the prime minister is a Roman Catholic (such as Andy Burnham, prime minister since July 2026), they cannot advise the Sovereign on the appointment of a bishop, and instead those functions must be carried out by someone else. Burnham delegated his authority in this regard to the Lord Chancellor and, in September 2026, indicated the Government's intention to legislate to remove the impediment on Roman Catholics and Jews from advising on appointments.

== Future possibilities ==
In July 2007, shortly after taking office as Prime Minister, Gordon Brown released a green paper outlining several proposed reforms of the Prime Minister's ability to exercise traditional Royal Prerogative powers. Among these were several which could affect Church of England appointments, including those of diocesan bishops. The proposed scheme would see (in future) a single name emerge from the Crown Nominations Commission, rather than two, which the prime minister would simply pass along to the king. Furthermore, the role of the prime minister's appointments secretary would be reduced or even eliminated. It was agreed that from 2007 the first-named candidate would be selected by the prime minister, unless a change in circumstances meant that candidate could no longer accept the post.

In 2025, the Crown Nominations Commission votes on a name; if two-thirds of the commission agrees, the name is sent to the prime minister, who submits it to the king for approval.

== Sources ==
- Peter Owen - Choosing Bishops
