= Commissioner for Public Appointments =

The Commissioner for Public Appointments is a British public servant, appointed by the King, whose primary role is to provide independent assurance that ministerial public appointments across the United Kingdom by HM Government Ministers (and devolved appointments by Welsh Government Ministers) are made in accordance with the Principles of Public Appointments and the Cabinet Office's Governance Code on Public Appointments. The commissioner issues an annual report and a statistical bulletin each year.

There are similar bodies for two other jurisdictions of the United Kingdom – the Commissioner for Ethical Standards in Public Life in Scotland and the Office of the Commissioner for Public Appointments for Northern Ireland.

As of July 2026, the current commissioner for public appointments is Fiona Cannon.

== List of commissioners for public appointments in England and Wales ==
- November 1995 – March 1999: Sir Len Peach
- March 1999 – December 2005: Dame Rennie Fritchie (later Baroness Fritchie)
- January 2006 – December 2010: Dame Janet Gaymer
- January 2011 – March 2016: Sir David Normington
- April 2016 – September 2021: Peter Riddell
- September 2021 – present: Sir William Shawcross
