= John Beresford Leathes =

British physiologist and biochemist (1864–1956)

Professor John Beresford Leathes FRS FRCS FRCP
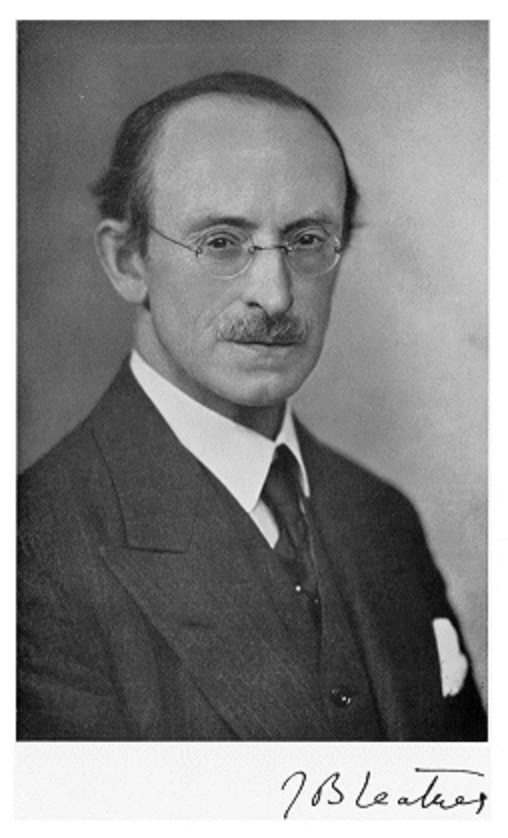
- Leathes in 1910.

Professor of physiology, University of Sheffield
- In office 1915–1933

Professor of Pathological Chemistry, University of Toronto
- In office 1909–1914

Personal details
- Born: 5 November 1864 London, England
- Died: 14 September 1956 (aged 91) Montreux, Switzerland

John Beresford Leathes (5 November 1864 – 14 September 1956) was a British physiologist and an early biochemist. He was the son of Hebrew scholar Stanley Leathes, and the brother of the poet, historian and First Civil Service Commissioner Sir Stanley Mordaunt Leathes.

== Early life ==
The son of the Rev. Stanley Leathes, the professor of Hebrew at King's College London and his wife Matilda (née Butt), a descendant of a Dr. Butt who was a physician to Henry VIII, his older brother was the poet, historian and senior Civil Servant Sir Stanley Mordaunt Leathes. John Beresford Leathes was educated in the Classics at Winchester College from 1878 to 1883. The college at that time possessed no science facilities, so he received little science teaching there. When Gladstone visited the College Leathes, welcoming him formally Ad Portas as Prefect of Hall, delivered a speech to him in Latin, to which Gladstone responded in English.

== Student years ==
In 1884 he went up to New College, Oxford where he obtained a second-class degree in Classics. Rejecting his father's wishes to become ordained in the Church of England, Leathes instead studied medicine at Guy's Hospital, walking 12 miles there and back each day from his aunt's home in Highgate. He qualified BMBCh (Oxford) in 1893, and in 1894 passed FRCS.

Leathes was a student demonstrator in Anatomy at Guy's, and during 1894–95 was a demonstrator there in Physiology under his friend Ernest Starling. He could not train as a surgeon owing to his poor eyesight. In 1895 he was elected a member of The Physiological Society. From 1895 to 1897 Leathes was studying in Bern before moving to Strasbourg (1898–99) where he studied under Oswald Schmiedeberg. On returning to London in 1899 Leathes was appointed Lecturer in Physiology at St Thomas's Hospital Medical School. For some eight years he also held a part-time appointment at the Lister Institute.

== Academic career ==
In 1909 he became honorary secretary of The Physiological Society, but had to resign the post when he moved to Canada later in the year when he was appointed to the newly created chair in pathological chemistry at the University of Toronto. While here he founded a local medical research society and when, in 1912, a new building beside the Toronto General Hospital was opened housing the Department of Pathology and Bacteriology and the Department of Pathological Chemistry Leathes established laboratories there for graduate students interested in a course of teaching and research in chemical medicine. He remained in Toronto until 1914 when he returned to the UK to take up the post of professor of physiology at the University of Sheffield, where he also served two terms as dean of the Faculty of Medicine.

During World War I he was in charge of the nephritis wards at the Northern General Hospital in Sheffield and was appointed to the staff of the hospital as Honorary Physiologist in addition to being responsible for the establishment of biochemical laboratories at the two general hospitals in the city in 1919. He represented Sheffield University on the General Medical Council from 1919 to 1938, and for 10 years was an editor of The Journal of Physiology. Leathes remained at Sheffield until his retirement in 1933.

Leathes was elected a Fellow of the Royal Society in 1911. In 1921 he was made a Fellow of the Royal College of Physicians of London, where in 1923 he delivered the Croonian Lecture, and in 1930 the Harveian Oration. He was awarded Honorary Doctor of Science degrees by the University of Manchester and the University of Sheffield.

After leaving Sheffield Leathes moved firstly to Wantage and then to the University of Oxford where he worked for a short period with Professor John Mellanby, FRS in the laboratory of physiology; however, this activity was curtailed with the outbreak of World War II in 1939, when Leathes retired successively to Lyme Regis, London and Southbourne, finally settling after the war in Montreux in Switzerland where he died in September 1956 aged 92.

== Family ==
He married Sonia Marie Natanson (1871–1964), a Russian Jew, in London in 1896. Their daughter Margaret Leathes married Lionel Penrose MD, FRS, Professor of Genetics at University College, London in 1928, and was the mother of Oliver Penrose, the theoretical physicist; Sir Roger Penrose, a mathematical physicist; Jonathan Penrose, the chess player and Shirley Hodgson, a geneticist.

== Publications ==
- Problems in Animal Metabolism; A Course of Lectures Given in the Physiological Laboratory of the London University at South Kensington in the Summer Term, 1904 London : John Murray, (1906)
- The Fats London : Longmans & Co., (1910)
