= Peter Riddell =

British journalist and author

The Right Honourable Sir Peter Riddell CBE
- Born: 14 October 1948 (age 77); Torquay, Devon, England
- Education: Dulwich College
- Alma mater: Sidney Sussex College, Cambridge (BA, MA)
- Occupations: Journalist, author
- Years active: 1970–present
- Spouse: Avril (m. 1994)
- Children: 1

Sir Peter John Robert Riddell CBE (born 14 October 1948) is a British journalist and author. He worked for the Financial Times from 1970 to 1991, and from 2012 to 2016 was the director of the Institute for Government. From April 2016 to September 2021 he served as the British government's Commissioner for Public Appointments.

== Early and personal life ==
Riddell was born in Torquay, Devon, on 14 October 1948. His father, a solicitor, served in the RAF during the Second World War. Riddell lived in Streatham, London, during his early life. He attended Dulwich College and later graduated from Sidney Sussex College, Cambridge, with a BA in history and economics and an MA.

Riddell married Avril in 1994. They have one daughter, born in 1996.

== Journalism career ==
Riddell joined the Financial Times (FT) in 1970. He was property correspondent in the early 1970s and economics correspondent in the late 1970s, covering events such as the 1976 IMF crisis. He became the FT's political editor in 1981, at the age of 33. He was US editor and Washington bureau chief at the FT between 1989 and 1991, when he left the newspaper. From 1991 to 2010, he was a political commentator for The Times, of which he was also an assistant editor.

== Civil society work ==
He has been a member of the Hansard Society council since 1996 and was its chair from 2007 until 2012. He was a senior fellow at the Institute for Government from 2008 until 2011, and beginning in January 2012 he was its director.

On 6 July 2010, the Prime Minister, David Cameron, announced that Riddell would be one of three members of an inquiry to determine whether British intelligence officers were complicit in the torture of detainees, including those from the Guantanamo Bay detention camp or subject to rendition flights.

On 20 April 2016, the Cabinet Office announced that Riddell would replace Sir David Normington as the new Commissioner for Public Appointments. His term, which was initially due to expire at the end of April 2021, was extended until the end of September 2021.

== Honours ==
As part of his work on the torture enquiry, in 2010 Riddell was appointed to the Privy Council to permit easier access to secret information, entitling him to the style "The Right Honourable".

On 25 November 2010, Riddell was awarded the President's Medal by the British Academy "for an outstanding record as the producer of an informed picture of the inner workings of Whitehall, high politics and the party battle".

Riddell was appointed Commander of the Order of the British Empire (CBE) in the 2012 Birthday Honours for services to journalism and for public service. He was knighted in the 2022 New Year Honours for public service.

== Publications ==
- The Thatcher Government (1983), ISBN 978-0-631-14519-6
- The Thatcher Decade (1989), ISBN 978-0-631-16274-2
- The Thatcher Era and Its Legacy (1991), ISBN 978-0-631-18268-9
- Honest Opportunism: The Rise of the Career Politician (1993), ISBN 978-0-575-40039-9
- Parliament Under Pressure (1997), ISBN 978-0-575-06435-5
- Parliament Under Blair (2000), ISBN 978-1-902301-60-0
- Blair Government (2002), ISBN 978-1-902301-74-7
- Hug Them Close: Blair, Clinton, Bush and the 'Special Relationship' (2004), ISBN 978-1-84275-118-3
- The Unfulfilled Prime Minister: Tony Blair's Quest for a Legacy (2006), ISBN 978-1-84275-168-8
- In Defence of Politicians (in Spite of Themselves) (2011), ISBN 978-1-84954-037-7
- The Power of Judges (2018), ISBN 978-1912208234
- 15 Minutes of Power: The Uncertain Life of British Ministers (2019), ISBN 978-1788162180

Government offices
Preceded by Sir David Normington	Commissioner for Public Appointments; 2016–present	Incumbent
