= First Civil Service Commissioner =

UK government occupation

- Civil Service Commission logo

- Flag of the United Kingdom

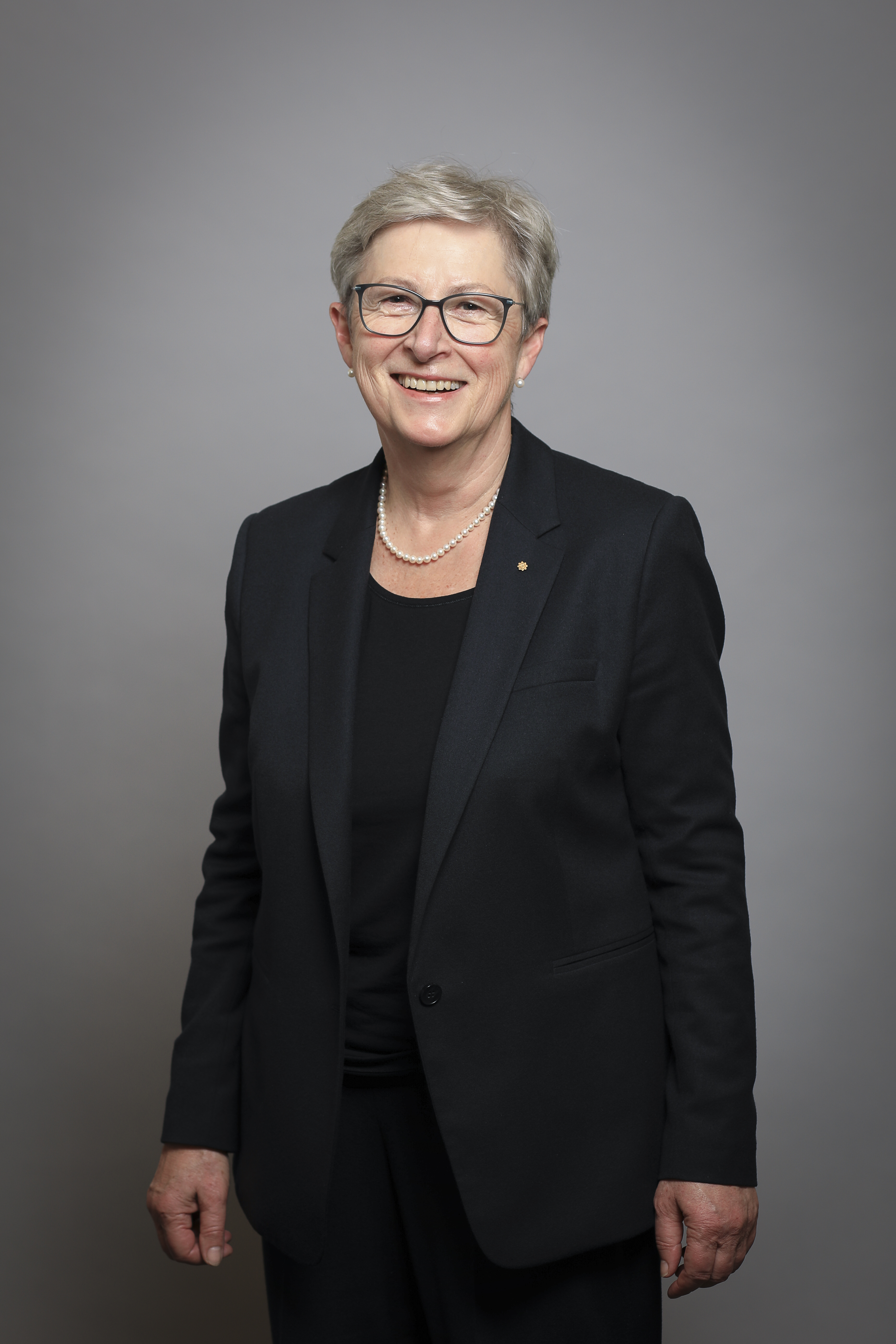
- Incumbent; Gisela Stuart, Baroness Stuart of Edgbaston since March 2022
- Civil Service Commission
- Seat: Westminster, London
- Appointer: The King on the advice of the prime minister
- Term length: Five years
- Inaugural holder: Sir Edward Ryan
- Formation: 1885

The First Civil Service Commissioner heads the Civil Service Commission, a statutory body which ensures that appointments to the Civil Service in the United Kingdom are made openly and on merit, and hears appeals from civil servants under the Civil Service Code.

The post was created in 1855 following publication of the Northcote–Trevelyan Report by Charles Trevelyan and Stafford Northcote that advocated the decoupling of appointments of senior civil servants from ministers to insure the impartiality of the Civil Service. Following a report of the Committee on Standards in Public Life, "Defining the Boundaries within the Executive: Ministers, special advisers and the permanent Civil Service" in 2003, the appointment of the First Civil Service Commissioner is made by Government after consultation with the leaders of the main opposition parties. They are then appointed by the King under Royal Prerogative.

== List of first civil service commissioners ==
- Sir Edward Ryan (1855–1875)
- John Pakington, 1st Baron Hampton (1875–1880)
- George Byng, Viscount Enfield (later The 3rd Earl of Strafford) (1880–88)
- ...
- William Courthope (1892–1907)
- Lord Francis Hervey (1907–1909)
- Sir Stanley Leathes (1910–1927)
- Sir Roderick Meikejohn (1927–1939)
- Sir Percival Waterfield (1939–1951)
- Sir Paul Sinker (1951–1954)
- Laurence Helsby, Baron Helsby (1954–1959)
- Sir George Mallaby (1959–1964)
- Sir George Abell (1964–1967)
- John Hunt (later Baron Hunt of Tanworth) (1967–1971)
- Sir Kenneth Clucas (1971–1974)
- Dr Fergus Allen (1974–1981)
- Angus Fraser (1981–1983)
- Dennis Trevelyan (1983–1989)
- John Holroyd (1989–1993)
- Dame Ann Bowtell (1993–1995)
- Sir Michael Bett (1995–2000)
- Usha Prashar, Baroness Prashar (2000–2005)
- Dame Janet Paraskeva (2006–2010)
- Mark Addison (2011) (interim)
- Sir David Normington (2011–2016)
- Kathryn Bishop (2016) (interim)
- Ian Watmore (2016–2021)
- Rosie Glazebrook (2021) (interim)
- Gisela Stuart, Baroness Stuart of Edgbaston (2022–present)
