= Michael Partridge =

British civil servant

Sir Michael John Anthony Partridge, KCB is a retired British civil servant, who served as Permanent Secretary to the former Department of Social Security. After his civil service career he was pro-vice chancellor and governor at Middlesex University.

== Education ==
Partridge studied at Merchant Taylors' School and then at St. John's College, Oxford. He is now an Honorary Fellow of St. John's.

Government offices
Preceded by Sir Christopher France	Second Permanent Secretary of the Department of Health and Social Security; 1987–1988	Succeeded by Department abolished
Preceded by Department created	Permanent Secretary of the Department of Social Security; 1988–1995	Succeeded by Ann Bowtell
