= George Mallaby =

George Mallaby may refer to:

- George Mallaby (actor) (1939–2004), English-born actor who worked on Australian television
- George Mallaby (public servant) (1902–1978), English schoolmaster, public servant, and UK High Commissioner to New Zealand
