= David Normington =

British civil servant

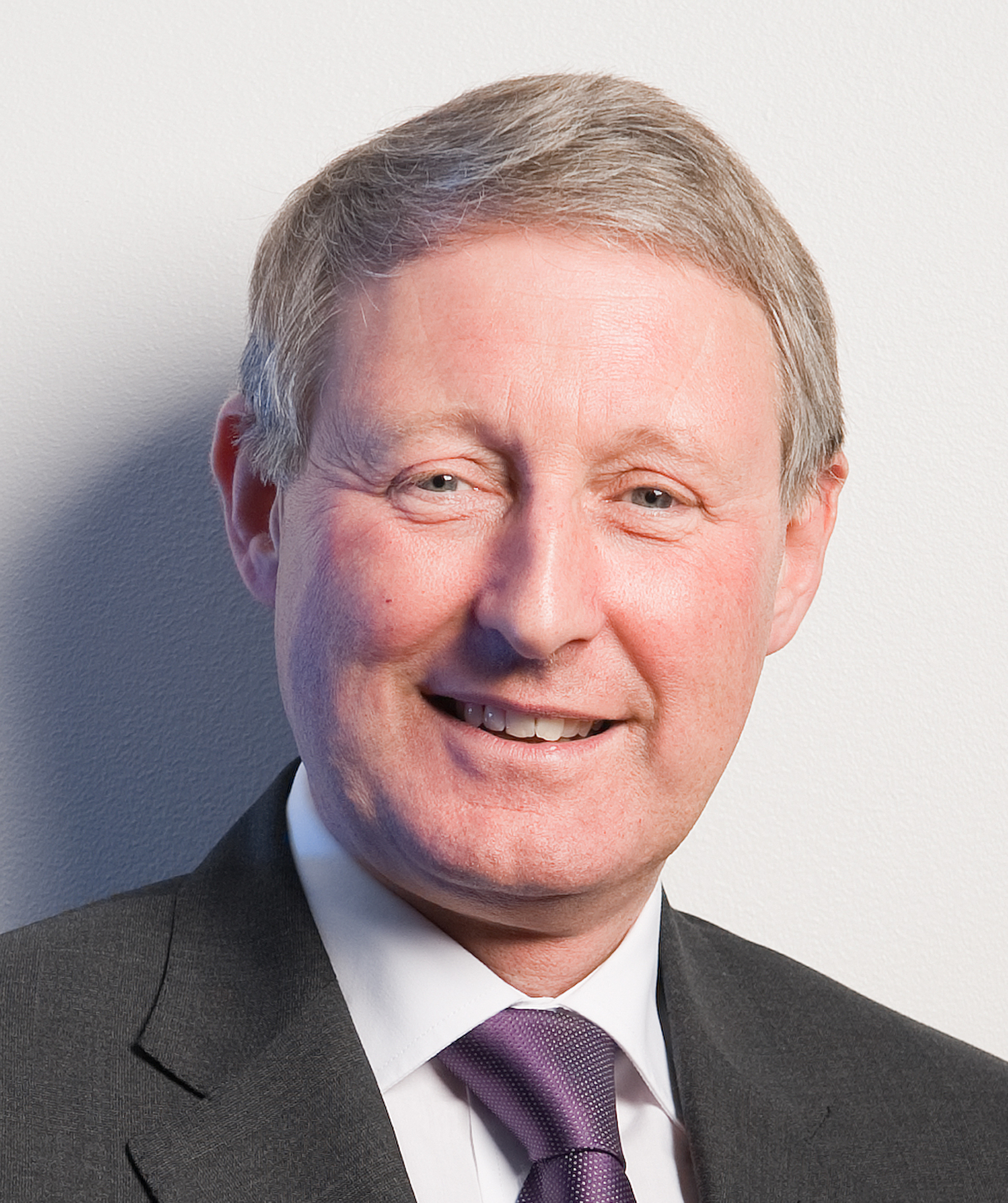
Official portrait, 2010

Sir David John Normington, GCB (born 18 October 1951) is a retired British civil servant. He served as the Permanent Secretary of the Department for Education and Skills from 2001 to 2005, and then of the Home Office until 2011. From 2011 until 2016 he served as both the First Civil Service Commissioner and the Commissioner for Public Appointments for the British government.

== Career ==
Normington attended Bradford Grammar School. A graduate of Corpus Christi College, Oxford, Normington's career began in the Department of Employment. There he was responsible variously for the previous Government's programme of trade union reform, for measures to reduce unemployment, and for youth training. He was Principal Private Secretary to Tom King, Secretary of State for Employment in 1983 and 1984. He was also responsible for co-ordinating the efforts of central Government to regenerate the seven most deprived London boroughs.

In 1995, when the Department of Employment and Department of Education merged, he played a central role in the creation of the new Department for Education and Employment (DfEE). From there he moved on to become DfEE's Director-General for Strategy and Analytical Services and for the International Division in the run-up to the UK Presidency of the European Union. In 1998, Normington became the Director-General for Schools, bringing together responsibility for all schools policy and operations. He became Permanent Secretary in 2001 where he served for five years until joining the Home Office as its Permanent Secretary in January 2006.

He has been called "something more akin to James Bond than a top civil servant", and his nickname in his previous appointment as permanent secretary at the Department for Education and Skills was 'the smiling assassin'. He is also described as 'extremely charming', 'civilised and urbane' – and a 'tough nut'. One of Normington's lasting legacies in the DfES was his decision to reduce the Department's workforce by approximately a third, made in 2003. This decision came in advance of the subsequent budget announcing a large reduction of the civil service as a whole, leading some to speculate that Normington had made his own cuts early in an attempt to curry favour. He applied for the job of Cabinet Secretary but was beaten by Sir Gus O'Donnell.

Normington was appointed a Companion of the Order of the Bath (CB) in the 2000 New Year Honours, promoted to Knight Commander of the same Order (KCB) in the 2005 New Year Honours, and promoted again to Knight Grand Cross of that Order (GCB) in the 2011 New Year Honours. In 2010 it was announced that he would retire from the Civil Service and become the First Civil Service Commissioner and Commissioner for Public Appointments, the first time the two roles had been combined.

=== Arrest of Damian Green ===
Normington was responsible for initiating the investigation that ended with the police arresting shadow immigration minister Damian Green, allegedly because Green told the press that the government had given licences to illegal workers, that an illegal worker was employed in the Houses of Parliament, and two more documents.

The complaint was dismissed by the Crown Prosecution Service (CPS), after MPs concluded "that growing frustration in both the Home Office and the Cabinet Office may have led officials to give an exaggerated impression of the damage done by the leaks that could reasonably be presumed to have emanated from the Home Office".

== Scam alert ==
Illegitimate and unauthorised attempts have allegedly been made to exploit Normington's reputation by improperly using his name to sponsor or lend credibility to entry clearance and visa applications by foreign nationals seeking to come to the United Kingdom.

Government offices
Preceded by Sir Michael Bichard	Permanent Secretary of the Department for Education and Skills; 2001–2005	Succeeded by Sir David Bell
Preceded by Sir John Gieve	Permanent Secretary of the Home Office; 2005–2011	Succeeded by Dame Helen Ghosh
Preceded by Dame Janet Paraskeva	First Civil Service Commissioner; 2011–2016	Succeeded by Ian Watmore
Preceded by Dame Janet Gaymer	Commissioner for Public Appointments; 2011–2016	Succeeded by Peter Riddell
