= John Hunt, Baron Hunt of Tanworth =

British civil servant

The Right Honourable The Lord Hunt of Tanworth GCB
- Portrait by Bassano, 1971

Member of the House of Lords
- Lord Temporal
- Life peerage 8 February 1980 – 17 July 2008

Personal details
- Born: 23 October 1919 Minehead, Somerset, UK
- Died: 17 July 2008 (aged 88) London
- Occupation: Civil servant
- Known for: Cabinet Secretary, Life Peer and member of HoL

John Joseph Benedict Hunt, Baron Hunt of Tanworth, GCB (23 October 1919 – 17 July 2008) was a British civil servant.

Born in Minehead, Somerset to Major A. L. Hunt MC by his wife Daphne (née Ashton Case), he was educated at Downside School and Magdalene College, Cambridge before joining the Civil Service in 1946.

Hunt became Cabinet Secretary from 1973 to 1979, being the first Roman Catholic to hold this post since its creation in 1916.

Lord Hunt of Tanworth married firstly in 1941 The Hon. Magdalen Robinson (died 1971) and, by his second wife Madeleine, Lady Charles (née Hume), was a brother-in-law of the late Basil Hume, Cardinal Archbishop of Westminster.

== Honours and awards ==
Hunt was appointed a Companion of the Order of the Bath (CB) in the 1968 Birthday Honours, promoted Knight Commander of the Order of the Bath (KCB) in the 1973 Birthday Honours and was advanced to Knight Grand Cross of the Order of the Bath (GCB) in the 1977 Birthday Honours.

Hunt was created a Life Peer with the title Baron Hunt of Tanworth, of Stratford-upon-Avon in the County of Warwickshire on 8 February 1980,

Lord Hunt was also appointed Officier de la Légion d'honneur by President François Mitterrand and Knight Commander of the Order of Pius IX by Pope John Paul II.

== In popular culture ==
Hunt was one of the more powerful cabinet secretaries, and was seen by many political figures (especially in the Second Wilson Ministry) as an "imperialist" who relished expanding the power of his remit. His uncanny mastery of procedure and ability to steer meetings to the conclusion he wished made him a considerable source of inspiration for the character of Sir Humphrey Appleby on the television series Yes Minister and Yes, Prime Minister.

Government offices
Preceded by Sir George Abell	First Civil Service Commissioner; 1968–1971	Succeeded by Kenneth Clucas
Preceded by Sir William Nield	Second Permanent Secretary at the Cabinet Office; 1972–1973	Succeeded by Sir Patrick Nairne
Preceded by Sir Burke Trend	Cabinet Secretary; 1973–1979	Succeeded by Sir Robert Armstrong
