= Dennis Trevelyan =

British civil servant (1929–2024)

Dennis John Trevelyan, CB (21 July 1929 – 19 July 2024) was a British civil servant and college head.

== Life and career ==
Born on 21 July 1929, Trevelyan attended University College, Oxford, before he entered HM Civil Service in 1950 as an official in the Home Office. He was Director-General of HM Prison Service from 1978 to 1983. While there, he was responsible for overseeing the implementation of the May Report's recommendations. The Times reported in 1983 that the Prison Reform Trust "complimented Mr Trevelyan on the relative openness of the prison system". In another article, The Times noted that, by the time he left office, the rate of incarceration was rising and prison officers were considering striking, while a report by the Chief Inspector of Prisons criticised the state of the prisons themselves. The same paper, however, called Trevelyan "an enlightened, efficient and reforming director-general", but noted that "even he found himself unable to overcome the combined forces of governmental timidity, departmental and judicial conservatism, prison officer resistance and, not least, the inexorably rising crime rate". He had been appointed a Companion of the Order of the Bath in the 1981 Birthday Honours.

In 1983, Trevelyan was appointed First Civil Service Commissioner. During his tenure, which ended in 1989, he "actively upheld the vetting of Whitehall appointments to ensure that they were made on the basis of fair and open competition". He protested against Michael Heseltine's appointment of Peter Levene as a procurement official in the Ministry of Defence, insisting successfully that the Commission had to review his credentials first. He was less successful, despite his efforts, at recruiting more non-Oxbridge administrative trainees.

Trevelyan retired from the civil service in 1989 and was elected Principal of Mansfield College, Oxford, serving from 1989 to 1996. During that time, Trevelyan was credited with leading the effort to make Mansfield a Full College of the University of Oxford.

Trevelyan died on 19 July 2024, at the age of 94.

Government offices
Preceded by Angus Fraser	First Civil Service Commissioner (Deputy Secretary, Cabinet Office Management and Personnel Office); 1983–1989	Succeeded by John Holroyd
Academic offices
Preceded by Donald Sykes	Principal of Mansfield College, Oxford; 1989–1996	Succeeded by David Marquand
