= Richard Tilbrook =

British civil servant (born 1962)

Richard James Tilbrook CVO (born 11 April 1962) is a British civil servant and Clerk of the Privy Council.

== Education ==
Tilbrook was educated at the Royal Grammar School, Guildford, leaving the school in 1979, and went on to read classics at Queens’ College, Cambridge, where he gained a First and sang counter-tenor in the Chapel Choir.

== Career ==
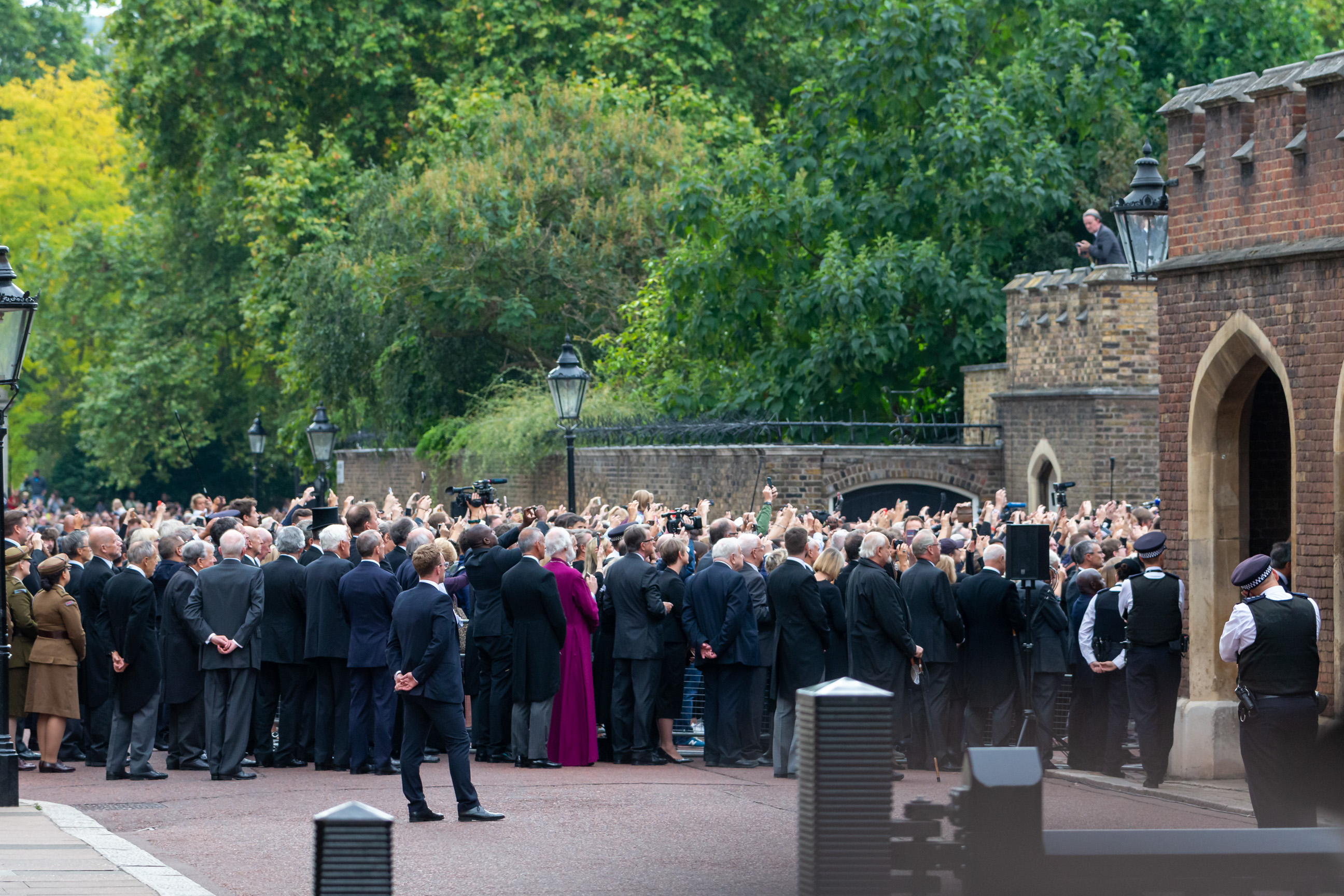
The public and members of the Accession Council watching the proclamation of the new king in Friary Court at St James's Palace.

After university, Tilbrook joined GCHQ as a codebreaker before being seconded to the Cabinet Office to write intelligence-based assessments for the Joint Intelligence Committee. He later moved to the Department for International Development.

In 2020 he took up positions running the British honours system as the Prime Minister's Appointments Secretary advising the prime minister on the appointment of bishops, deans and lord-lieutenants, and serving as Clerk of the Privy Council. He sparked upset by attempting to curb the size of the growing Privy Council and determining that only a limited number would be able to attend the Accession Council.

In his role as Clerk of the Privy Council, he played a key role at the Accession Council where Charles III was proclaimed King. The following text, which was published as a supplement to The London Gazette of 12 September, was read by Tilbrook as the clerk of the Accession Council:

Whereas it has pleased Almighty God to call to His Mercy our late Sovereign Lady Queen Elizabeth the Second of Blessed and Glorious memory, by whose Decease the Crown of the United Kingdom of Great Britain and Northern Ireland is solely and rightfully come to The Prince Charles Philip Arthur George:

We, therefore, the Lords Spiritual and Temporal of this Realm and Members of the House of Commons, together with other members of Her late Majesty's Privy Council and representatives of the Realms and Territories, Aldermen, and Citizens of London, and others, do now hereby with one voice and Consent of Tongue and Heart publish and proclaim that The Prince Charles Philip Arthur George is now, by the Death of our late Sovereign of Happy Memory, become our only lawful and rightful Liege Lord Charles the Third, by the Grace of God of the United Kingdom of Great Britain and Northern Ireland and of his other Realms and Territories, King, Head of the Commonwealth, Defender of the Faith, to whom we do acknowledge all Faith and Obedience with humble Affection; beseeching God by whom Kings and Queens do reign to bless His Majesty with long and happy Years to reign over us.

Given at St James's Palace this tenth day of September in the year of Our Lord two thousand and twenty-two.

GOD SAVE THE KING

== Personal life ==
Tilbrook is a communicant Anglican, worshipping at St Andrew's Church, Naunton, in the Diocese of Gloucester.

Tilbrook was made a Commander of the Royal Victorian Order in the 2022 New Year Honours.

Tilbrook's school, the Royal Grammar School, Guildford, awarded him their King’s Tie "for his outstanding public service and support for the RGS".
