= Prime Minister's Appointments Secretary =

The Prime Minister's Appointments Secretary is a British civil servant who leads the appointment of various senior public figures on behalf of the prime minister of the United Kingdom, from Regius Professors to Church of England bishops to Lord Lieutenants. For ecclesiastical appointments, they sit on the Crown Nominations Commission.

The first Appointments Secretary was Anthony Bevir, who was appointed in 1947. Prior to this, the handling of appointments had been a duty of the Treasury clerk serving within the Prime Minister's private office.

== List of Prime Minister's Appointments Secretaries ==
- 1947-1957: Sir Anthony Bevir
- 1955-1961: Sir David Stephens
- 1961–1972: Sir John Hewitt KCVO CB
- 1974–1982: Colin Peterson
- 1982–1993: Sir Robin Catford KCVO
- 1993–1999: John Holroyd CB CVO
- 1999–2008: William Chapman CVO
- 2008–2014: Sir Paul Britton CB CVO
- 2011–2020: Richard Tilbrook (senior state appointments; assumed full role in 2020)
- 2014–2019: Edward Chaplin CMG OBE (senior ecclesiastical appointments)
- 2020–2022: Richard Tilbrook CVO
- 2022–present: Jonathan Hellewell LVO
