= Robin Catford =

British civil servant

Sir Robin Catford KCVO CBE

Prime Minister's Appointments Secretary
- In office 1982–1993
- Prime Minister: Margaret Thatcher; John Major
- Preceded by: Colin Vyvyan Peterson
- Succeeded by: John Holroyd

Personal details
- Born: 11 January 1923
- Died: 27 May 2008 (aged 85)
- Spouse: Daphne Georgina Darby
- Education: St Andrews University; St John's College, Cambridge
- Occupation: Civil Servant

Sir Robin Catford, KCVO, CBE (11 January 1923 – 27 May 2008) was a British civil servant who served as the Prime Minister's Appointments Secretary to Margaret Thatcher and John Major.

== Early life ==
Sir Robin attended Hampton Grammar School before reading Agriculture at St Andrews University and St John's College, Cambridge.

== Career ==
After Cambridge, Sir Robin joined the Sudan Civil Service for nine years. On his return to Britain, he entered industry and worked for Fisons.

In 1966, he joined the Ministry of Agriculture and Fisheries as Principal Secretary, eventually becoming under-secretary in 1979.

In 1982, Sir Robin was appointed Prime Minister's Appointments Secretary, succeeding Colin Vyvyan Peterson. He was responsible for advising the Prime Minister on Crown appointments. These largely consisted of senior Church of England appointments but also included, for instance, the selection of Ted Hughes to succeed John Betjeman as Poet Laureate.

In 1988, Sir Robin helped Margaret Thatcher to write her "Sermon on the Mound" speech.

He was appointed a Commander of the Order of the British Empire in 1990 and a Knight Commander of the Royal Victorian Order in 1993.

== Personal life ==
He married Daphne Georgina Darby in 1948. She died in 2005. Sir Robin and Lady Catford together had three sons and a daughter.

His recreations were listed in Who's Who as "Sailing, theatre, travel, arts, avoiding gardening".

He was a devout Anglican and a member of the Diocesan Synod of Chichester.
