= Fergus Allen =

Irish civil servant and writer (1921–2017)

Fergus Hamilton Allen CB FRSL (3 September 1921 – 22 July 2017) was a civil servant and author.

Allen was educated at Newtown School, Waterford before going up to Trinity College, Dublin (MA, MAI, ScD).

Government offices
Preceded by Kenneth Clucas	First Civil Service Commissioner; 1974–1981	Succeeded by Angus Fraser
