= Usha Prashar, Baroness Prashar =

British politician

The Right Honourable The Baroness Prashar CBE PC
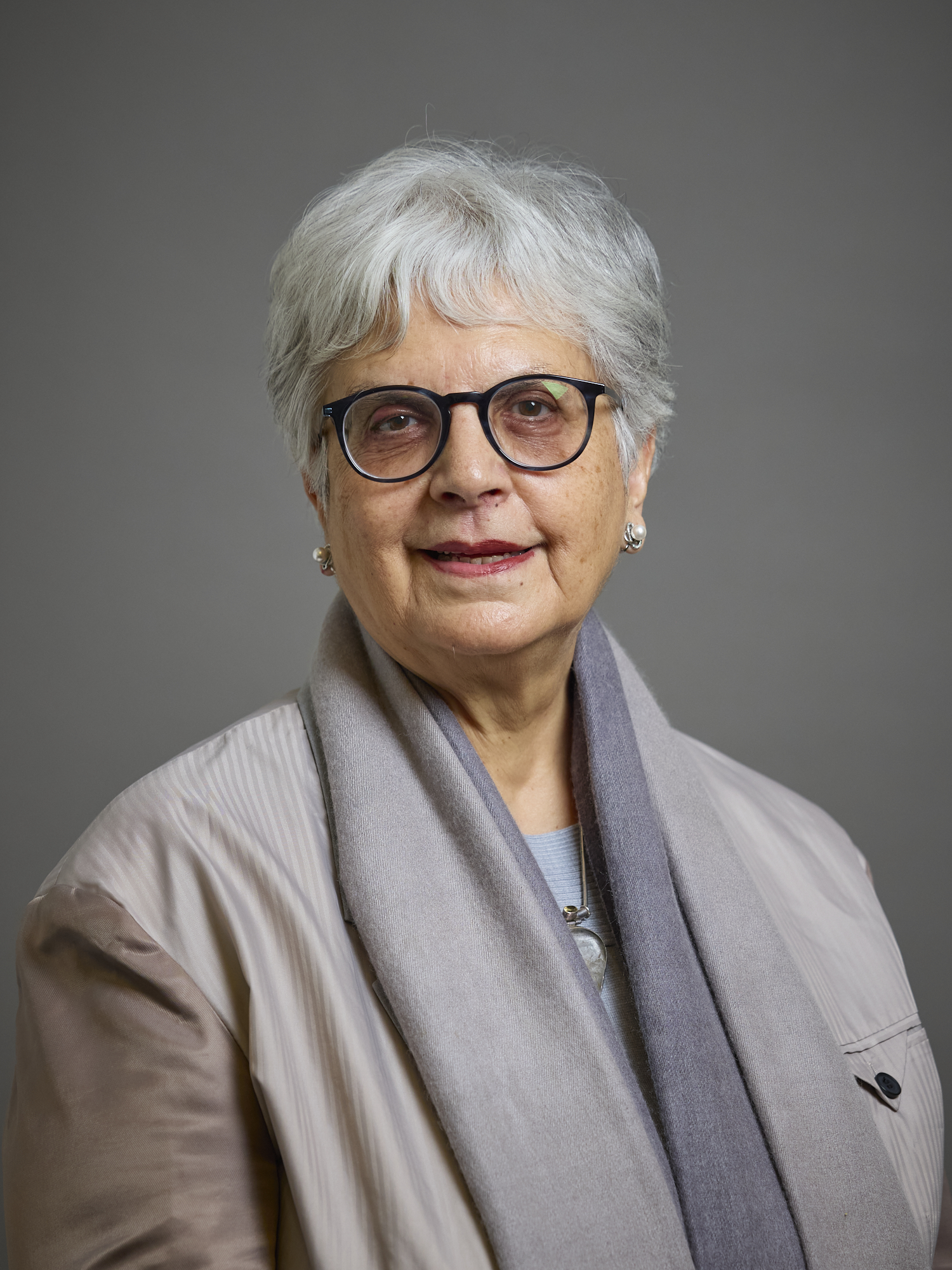
- Official portrait, 2025

Chair of the Judicial Appointments Commission
- In office 3 April 2006 – 7 February 2011
- Preceded by: Office created
- Succeeded by: Christopher Stephens

Chancellor of De Montfort University
- In office 2000–2006
- Vice-Chancellor: Philip Tasker
- Preceded by: John White
- Succeeded by: The Lord Alli

Member of the House of Lords
- Lord Temporal
- Life peerage 15 July 1999

Director of the National Council for Voluntary Organisations
- In office 1986–1991
- Preceded by: Bill Griffiths
- Succeeded by: Judy Weleminsky

Personal details
- Born: Usha Kumari Prashar; 29 June 1948 (age 78) Kenya Colony

Usha Prashar, Baroness Prashar is a British politician and a crossbench member of the House of Lords. Since the 1970s, she has served as a director or chair of a variety of public and private sector organisations. She became the first chair of the Judicial Appointments Commission upon its creation in April 2006.

== Early life and education ==
Born in Kenya, she came to Yorkshire with her father Naurhia Lal Prashar and family in the 1960s. She was educated at the then direct grant school Wakefield Girls' High School, becoming head girl in 1967. Prashar read Politics at Leeds University, graduating in 1970 with a Bachelor of Arts degree, after which she undertook postgraduate studies in Social Administration at the University of Glasgow.

== Career ==
=== Private sector ===
Baroness Prashar was a non-executive director of Channel Four Television Corporation from 1992 to 1999, of UNITE Group plc from 2001 to 2004, and became a non-executive director of ITV plc in February 2005.

=== Public sector ===
Baroness Prashar was executive chair of the Parole Board of England and Wales from October 1997 to October 2000. Having been appointed a Civil Service Commissioner in 1990, she was First Civil Service Commissioner from August 2000 to 2005.

=== Non-governmental sector ===
Baroness Prashar is a trustee of Cumberland Lodge, an educational charity initiating fresh debate on the burning questions facing society.

Baroness Prashar became a governor of De Montfort University in 1996, and became its chancellor in 2001. She was chair of the National Literacy Trust from 2001 to 2005. She was appointed a trustee of the BBC World Service Trust in 2002, and was president of the Royal Commonwealth Society. She was Deputy Chair of the British Council.

Baroness Prashar was a director of the Runnymede Trust from 1976 to 1984, a Fellow with the Policy Studies Institute from 1984 to 1986, and Director of the National Council for Voluntary Organisations from 1986 to 1991. She is also a governor of the Ditchley Foundation, which organises conferences in Oxfordshire.

=== Iraq Inquiry ===
Since July 2009, Baroness Prashar has served on the Iraq Inquiry. She was sworn of the Privy Council the same year to facilitate access to the classified information related to the Iraq War.

=== UK Community Foundations ===
She previously served as the Honorary President of UK Community Foundations (UKCF), the umbrella organisation for all community foundations, providing philanthropic advice to clients and delivering UK-wide grant-making programmes.

== Honours and styles ==
=== Honours ===
She was appointed as a Commander of the Order of the British Empire (CBE) in the 1995 New Year Honours for services to community relations, and was made a life peer on 15 July 1999 as Baroness Prashar, of Runnymede, in the County of Surrey.

In 2016, she was awarded an honorary doctorate of law by the University of London. Later in 2018, was awarded an honorary doctorate of literature from Kalinga Institute of Industrial Technology in India.

Government offices
Preceded by Sir Michael Bett	First Civil Service Commissioner; 2000–2005	Succeeded by Dame Janet Paraskeva
