= Michael Bett =

English business executive and public servant (1935–2026)

Sir Michael Bett CBE
- Born: 1935
- Died: 11 November 2026 (aged 91)
- Education: Pembroke College, Cambridge
- Occupations: Business executive, personnel manager and public servant

Sir Michael Bett, CBE (1935 – 11 November 2026) was an English business executive, personnel manager and public servant.

== Life and career ==
Educated at Pembroke College, Cambridge, Bett became director of industrial relations at the Engineering Employers' Federation in 1970; he was subsequently personnel director at General Electric (1972–77) and the BBC (1977–81), before moving to British Telecom (BT) where he held a series of management roles before becoming managing director BTUK in 1988 and then deputy chairman in 1991 (stepping down to be a non-executive director in 1994); he was also chairman of the telecommunications company Cellnet (1991–99), a joint venture between BT and the security firm Securicor.

Bett was appointed chairman of the Nurses Pay Review Body (1990), the Social Security Advisory Committee (1993) and the Armed Forces Independent Review of Manpower (1994). He left those posts in 1995, the year he was appointed First Civil Service Commissioner; he remained in office until 2000. Alongside a number of other directorships, he was also chairman of the Inspectorate of the Security Industry from 1994 to 2007 (the National Security Inspectorate from 2000), a higher education pay review in the late 1990s, and the Pensions Protection and Investment Accreditation Board from 2000 to 2006. Having been Pro-Chancellor of Aston University since 1993, he served as Chancellor from 2004 to 2011. Bett was appointed a Commander of the Order of the British Empire (CBE) in the 1990 New Year Honours, and was knighted in the 1995 Birthday Honours for "services to training and personnel management".

Bett died on 11 November 2026, aged 91.

Government offices
Preceded by Ann Bowtell	First Civil Service Commissioner; 1995–2000	Succeeded by The Baroness Prashar
