= Janet Paraskeva =

British government official (born 1946)

The Right Honourable Dame Janet Paraskeva DBE
- Born: 28 May 1946 (age 80); Newport, Monmouthshire, Wales
- Occupation: British government official

Dame Janet Paraskeva DBE PC (born 28 May 1946, Newport, Monmouthshire, Wales) is a British government official.

== Early career ==
Paraskeva began her career as a science and mathematics teacher in 1967. After graduating from the Open University in 1983 with a degree in social sciences, Paraskeva joined HM Inspector of Schools where she worked until 1988.

== Public appointments ==
She has been chief executive at the Law Society's Council and Director for England of the National Lottery Charities Board. She also established and managed the England operation, awarding more than £1.5bn to voluntary organisations. Paraskeva has also been a magistrate and a member of the Youth Justice Board.

On 5 September 2005, she was appointed to the board of Britain's Serious Organised Crime Agency as a non-executive director.

She was appointed as the First Civil Service Commissioner on 1 January 2006. On 15 November 2007 Paraskeva was announced by Peter Hain, Secretary of State for Work and Pensions, as first Chair of the Child Maintenance and Enforcement Commission. Her appointment, which lasted four years, took effect on 19 November 2007.

In February 2006, Olympics Minister Tessa Jowell appointed Paraskeva as chair of the new Olympic Lottery Distributor (OLD) where she served until the body was dissolved in March 2013. The OLD had been established in July 2005, following London's selection as host city for the 2012 Summer Olympics. The body's key role was to ensure proper, timely and effective distribution of a £1.8 billion Lottery contribution and to fund the provision of facilities, services and functions required for the staging of the London 2012 Summer Olympics and Paralympic Games.

On 6 July 2010, Prime Minister David Cameron announced that Paraskeva would be one of three members of an inquiry to determine whether British intelligence officers were complicit in the torture of detainees, including those from the Guantanamo Bay detention camp or subject to rendition flights. Paraskeva joined the Privy Council to permit easier access to secret information.

She is affiliated with ChildLine, Ofsted and the British Youth Council. Since 2000, she has been a trustee of the civic group Common Purpose.

== Personal life ==
Paraskeva has two children from her first marriage. She stated her intention, under the Civil Partnership Act 2004, to enter into a civil partnership with her partner of more than a decade, whom she will only refer to as 'Mary'. Paraskeva has been a strong advocate for gay and lesbian rights in the UK.

In 2006, Paraskeva, along with numerous other Greek Cypriots, was featured in a book by Kyriakos Tsioupras, It's All Greek to Them, focusing on Cypriots who have had substantial influence within their communities.

== Awards and honours ==
- In 1978, she was awarded the Robert Schuman Silver Medal for European Unity.
- Paraskeva was appointed Dame Commander of the Order of the British Empire (DBE) in the 2010 Birthday Honours "for public service".

Government offices
Preceded by The Baroness Prashar	First Civil Service Commissioner; 2006–2010	Succeeded by Sir David Normington
