= Percival Waterfield =

English civil servant (1888-1965)

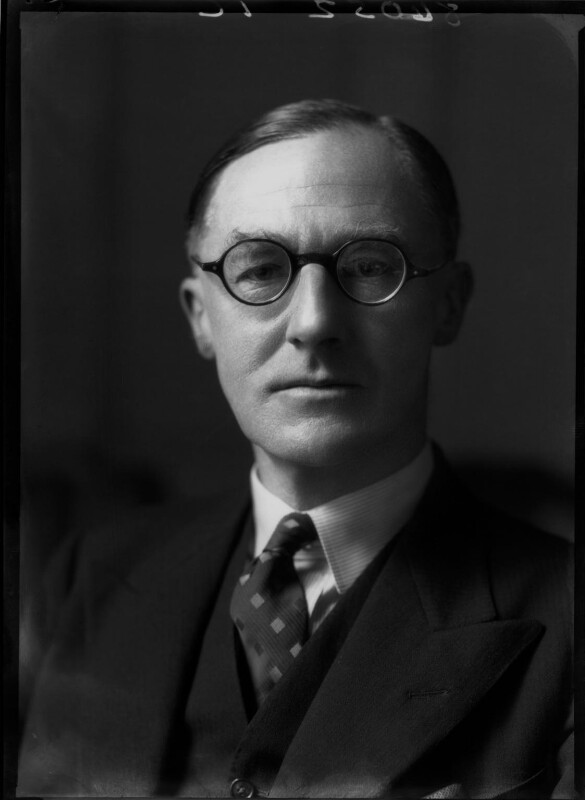
Waterfield in 1938

Sir Alexander Percival Waterfield, KBE, CB (16 May 1888 – 2 June 1965), commonly known as Percival Waterfield, was an English civil servant. Educated at Christ Church, Oxford, he entered the civil service in 1911 and served as the Treasury Remembrancer for Ireland from 1920 to 1922; from 1939 to 1951, he was First Civil Service Commissioner. Waterfield was one of 4 members of the Woodhead Commission (officially the Palestine Partition Commission) of 1938. His son was the diplomat John Waterfield.

Government offices
Preceded by Sir Roderick Meiklejohn	First Civil Service Commissioner; 1939–1951	Succeeded by Sir Paul Sinker
