= Angus Fraser (civil servant) =

British civil servant (1928–2001)

Sir Angus McKay Fraser KCB TD FSA

Efficiency advisor to the prime minister
- In office 1988–1992
- Preceded by: Robin Ibbs
- Succeeded by: Peter Levene

Chairman of the Customs and Excise
- In office 1983–1987

First Civil Service Commissioner
- In office 1981–1983
- Preceded by: Dr Fergus Allen
- Succeeded by: Dennis Trevelyan

Personal details
- Born: 8 March 1928 Maxwelltown, Dumfries
- Died: 27 May 2001 (aged 73) Munich, Germany
- Spouse: Margaret Neilson 1955 – 1968, Gillian Fenwick 1991 – 9 November 1993, his death
- Children: a son, Simon, and daughter, Caroline
- Education: University of Glasgow

Angus McKay Fraser KCB TD FSA (10 March 1928 – 27 May 2001) was a senior British Civil Servant politician and cabinet minister from 1979 until 1992, and a lifelong scholar of Gypsies, and of the author George Borrow.

== Early life ==
He was born at Dumfries, the son of a prison officer. He grew up in Falkirk, attending Falkirk High School where his interest in the life and writings of George Borrow was first kindled. After school he studied modern languages at the University of Glasgow.

After graduating he did Military Service in the Royal Artillery. He continued his association with the military as a member of the Territorial Army, receiving the Territorial Efficiency Decoration in 1966, at which time he held the rank of Major.

== Career ==
Fraser joined the Customs and Excise in 1952. His career tended to alternate between central Whitehall departments (Civil Service Department, The Treasury) and his own department. He rose to become Deputy Chairman of the Customs and Excise in 1978, followed by a Permanent Secretary position in the Civil Service Department (one of only 3 not Oxbridge educated at the time), and finally Chairman of the Customs and Excise.

Shortly after retiring from the Customs and Excise Fraser was appointed Efficiency Advisor in the Cabinet Office in 1988, apparently after Margaret Thatcher asked about 'the man from Customs'. He remained in post after Margaret Thatcher was succeeded by John Major, finally retiring in 1992.

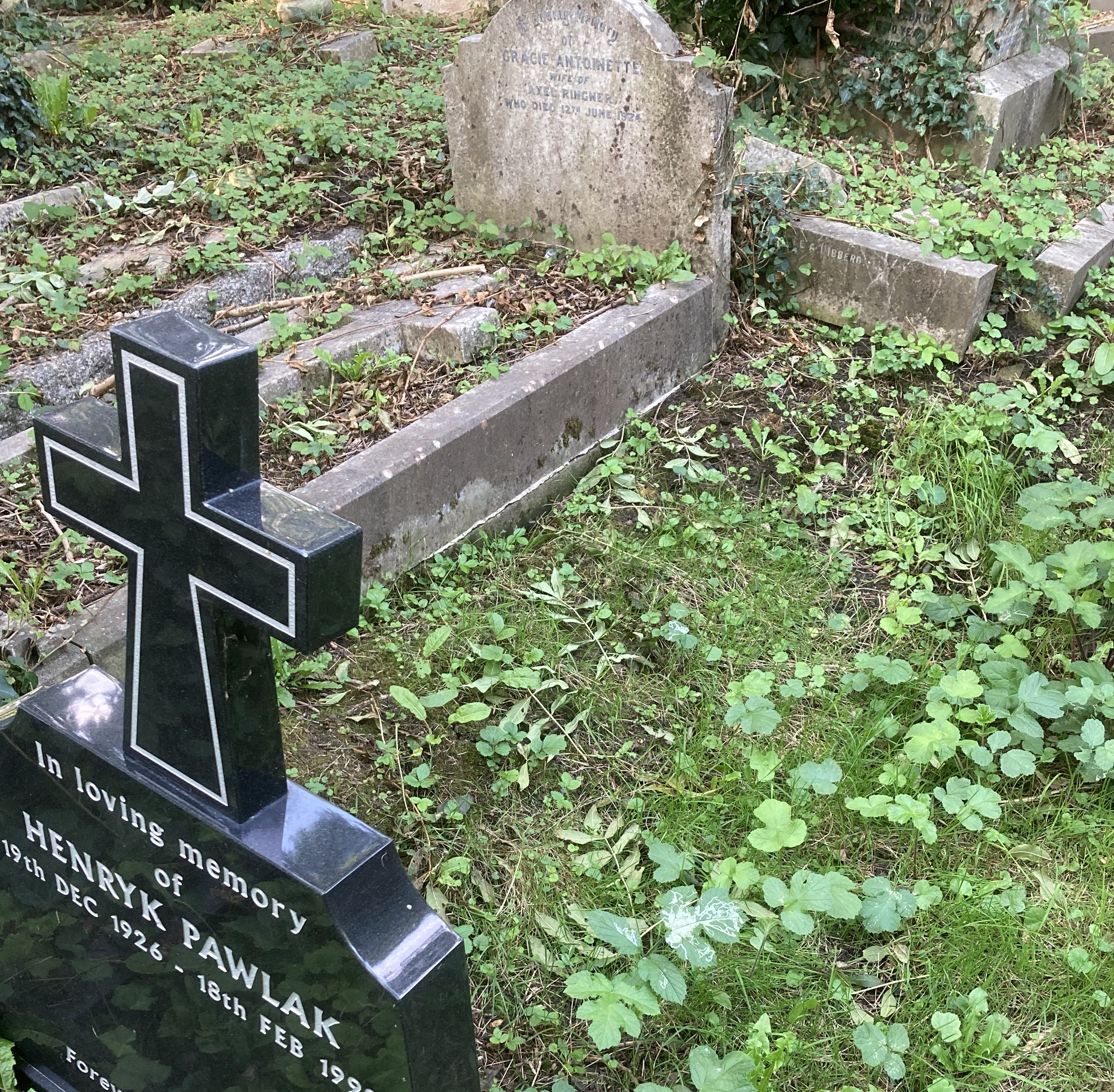
Unmarked family grave of Angus Fraser in Highgate Cemetery

== Later years ==
On his retirement from the Cabinet Office, Fraser largely devoted himself to his long-standing scholarly interests. Shortly after Fraser retired he published The Gypsies, a succinct account based on decades of study. Short before leaving office he had founded the George Borrow Society. He remained President of the society until his death.

He also found time to advise politicians inexperienced in public administration, varying from the leaders of the African National Congress, to the British Labour Party of Tony Blair.

Fraser was considered a pioneer of the emerging field of Romani studies.

He is buried in an unmarked family grave (plot no.52026 behind Pawlak) on the eastern side of Highgate Cemetery, set back from the main path opposite the grave of Malcolm McLaren.

== Honours ==
- Commander of the Order of the Bath, 1981
- Knight Commander of the Order of the Bath, 1985

Government offices
Preceded by Fergus Allen	First Civil Service Commissioner; 1981–1983	Succeeded by Dennis Trevelyan
Preceded by Sir Douglas Lovelock	Chairman of the Board of Customs and Excise; 1983–1987	Succeeded by Sir Brian Unwin
