= Ann Bowtell =

British civil servant

Dame Ann Bowtell DCB
- Born: Ann Elizabeth Kewell; 25 April 1938 (age 88)
- Education: Girton College, Cambridge
- Occupation: First Civil Service Commissioner

Dame Ann Elizabeth Bowtell DCB (née Kewell; born 25 April 1938) is a British retired civil servant. She was the UK's First Civil Service Commissioner from 1993 to 1995.

== Early life and education ==
Bowtell was born in 1938 to John Albert Kewell and Olive Rose Sims.

Bowtell was educated at Kendrick Girls' School in Reading. She studied Economics at Girton College, University of Cambridge, where she was made an honorary fellow in 1997.

In 1961, she married Michael John Bowtell. They have two sons and two daughters.

Government offices
Preceded by Sir Michael Partridge	Permanent Secretary of the Department of Social Security; 1997–1999	Succeeded by Rachel Lomax
Preceded by John Holroyd	First Civil Service Commissioner; 1993-1995	Succeeded by Sir Michael Bett
