= Kathryn Bishop =

British businessperson and author (born 1958)

Kathryn Bishop, CBE FRSA
- Born: 2 August 1958 (age 68)
- Education: Wellesley College and Jesus College Oxford

Kathryn Ann Bishop (born 2 August 1958) is a British businessperson, educator and author. She has worked with private, public and voluntary sector organisations undergoing change. She combines her practical experience, as a leader, director and non-executive director, with her teaching at the Saïd Business School at the University of Oxford, and writing business books.

== Early life and education ==
Kathryn Bishop attended secondary school in Worcestershire, and graduated from Wellesley College, Massachusetts in 1979 with a BA Honours, Summa Cum Laude. She was elected to Phi Beta Kappa, the American Honor Society, in 1978. She returned to the UK to study at Jesus College Oxford, earning an MPhil in English Studies in 1981, specialising in the literature of the period 1660 to 1798.

== Career ==
During her career, she has worked in the private sector, holding senior roles at Accenture, Allied Dunbar and Eagle Star, as well as in the public sector, at the University of the West of England. She has also held a variety of non-executive director roles, previously at the UK Intellectual Property Office, at Welsh Government and at the UK Border Agency, and currently at DAC Beachcroft LLP.

In 2012, she became a Civil Service Commissioner, one of then eleven commissioners responsible for regulating all appointments into the UK Civil Service. In 2016, she served as interim First Civil Service Commissioner. In 2017, she was appointed the first Chair of the Welsh Revenue Authority, set up to raise revenue in Wales for the first time in 800 years, as the Government of Wales Act came into operation.

As an associate fellow at the Saïd Business School at the University of Oxford, Bishop has designed, directed and taught executive development programmes for professional service firms and other multinational corporations. She has been the Programme Director for the Business School’s leadership development programmes for women, both online and residential, including the Women Transforming Leadership programme.

She was the Chairman of the Board of Trustees at the Dean Close Foundation under her married name, Kathryn Carden until 2026, and is currently a Governor at Collegiate School, Bristol. She is also a non-executive director on the board of DAC Beachcroft LLP.

She was elected to the Society of Merchant Venturers in Bristol in 2021.

== Honours and awards ==
Bishop was appointed Commander of the Order of the British Empire (CBE) in the Queen's Birthday Honours in 2021, for services to diversity and public administration. She was a recipient of an Excellence in Practice Award 2015: Gold Award for Executive Education, issued by European Foundation for Management Development. She is a Fellow of the Royal Society of Arts.

== Family and personal life ==
Kathryn Bishop is married with two sons and does her voluntary work under her married name, Kathryn Carden. She lives in Gloucestershire.

== Publications ==
- Bishop, Kathryn. Make Your Own Map: Career Success Strategy for Women. Kogan Page, 2021. ISBN 978-1-78966-836-0
- Bishop, Kathryn and Camm, Gillian. Board Talk: 18 Crucial Conversations that Count inside and outside the boardroom, Practical Inspiration Publishing, 2023. ISBN 978-1-78860-414-7
- (forthcoming) Bishop, Kathryn. Impetus: Tiny Tactics for Making Progress, Practical Inspiration Publishing, 2027. ISBN 978-1-80576-018-4
