= Laurence Helsby =

British civil servant

The Right Honourable The Lord Helsby GCB, KBE
- Laurence Norman Helsby, Baron Helsby in 1955

Principal Private Secretary to the Prime Minister
- In office 1947–1950
- Prime Minister: Clement Attlee
- Preceded by: Leslie Rowan
- Succeeded by: Denis Rickett

Personal details
- Born: Laurence Norman Helsby; 27 April 1908
- Died: 5 December 1978 (aged 70)
- Spouse: Wölmett (m. 1938)
- Children: 2
- Education: Sedbergh School
- Alma mater: Keble College, Oxford
- Awards: CB (1950); KBE (1955); GCB (1963)

Laurence Norman Helsby, Baron Helsby GCB KBE (27 April 1908 – 5 December 1978) was a British civil servant.

== Early life ==
Laurence Helsby was born on 27 April 1908 and educated at Sedbergh School in Cumbria, before studying at Keble College, Oxford. He lectured in economics at the University College of the South West of England (a predecessor institution of the University of Exeter) between 1930 and 1931 and at the University of Durham between 1931 and 1945.

== Career ==
In 1946, he joined the Civil Service, initially as an Assistant Secretary in the Treasury, before becoming Principal Private Secretary to the Prime Minister, Clement Attlee, between 1947 and 1950.

After a period working in the Ministry of Food, he was appointed First Civil Service Commissioner in 1954, transferring in 1959 to become Permanent Secretary of the Ministry of Labour. In 1963, he was made joint Permanent Secretary to the Treasury and Head of the Home Civil Service. In the 1970s he was a director of The Rank Organisation. Following his retirement, he was created a life peer on 21 May 1968 with the title Baron Helsby, of Logmore in the County of Surrey.

Helsby was made a Companion of the Order of the Bath (CB) in the 1950 New Year Honours, and was advanced to Knight Grand Cross of the Order of the Bath (GCB) in the 1963 New Year Honours; he had also been previously knighted (KBE) in the 1955 New Year Honours.

He was awarded an Honorary Fellowship of Keble College in 1959, and received honorary degrees from the universities of Exeter and Durham.

== Personal life ==
He married in 1938 to Wölmett whom he had met whilst teaching at Durham. The union produced a son and a daughter. Lord Helsby died on 5 December 1978.

Coat of arms of Laurence Helsby
Crest A horse salient Argent flowing from the neck a mantle chequy Or and Sable. Escutcheon Or a saltire Sable and a chief chequy Or and Sable. Motto Ride On

Government offices
Preceded by Leslie Rowan	Principal Private Secretary to the Prime Minister; 1947–1950	Succeeded by Denis Rickett
Preceded by Sir Paul Sinker	First Civil Service Commissioner; 1954–1959	Succeeded by Sir George Mallaby
Preceded by Sir Harold Emmerson as Permanent Secretary, Ministry of Labour and National Service	Permanent Secretary of the Ministry of Labour; 1959–1962	Succeeded by Sir James Dunnett
Preceded by Sir Norman Brook	Head of the Home Civil Service; 1963–1968	Succeeded by Sir William Armstrong
