= Paul Sinker =

English civil servant and classicist

Sir Algernon Paul Sinker, KCMG, CB (13 April 1905 – 26 February 1977), commonly known as Paul Sinker, was an English civil servant and classicist. He studied at Jesus College, Cambridge, where he was elected to a fellowship in 1928. In 1940, he was made a temporary civil servant to contribute to the war effort, and was noted for his competency; convinced to stay in 1945, he left his fellowship and became a permanent member of HM Civil Service. From 1951 to 1954, he was First Civil Service Commissioner. He then served as Director-General of the British Council from 1954 to 1968 and chairman of the Council for Small Industries in Rural Areas from 1968 to 1976.

Government offices
Preceded by Sir Percival Waterfield	First Civil Service Commissioner; 1951–1954	Succeeded by Sir Laurence Helsby
