= St Edward's School, Oxford =

Public school in Oxford, Oxfordshire, England

Coordinates: 51°46′36.55″N 01°16′07.27″W

St. Edward's School, Oxford

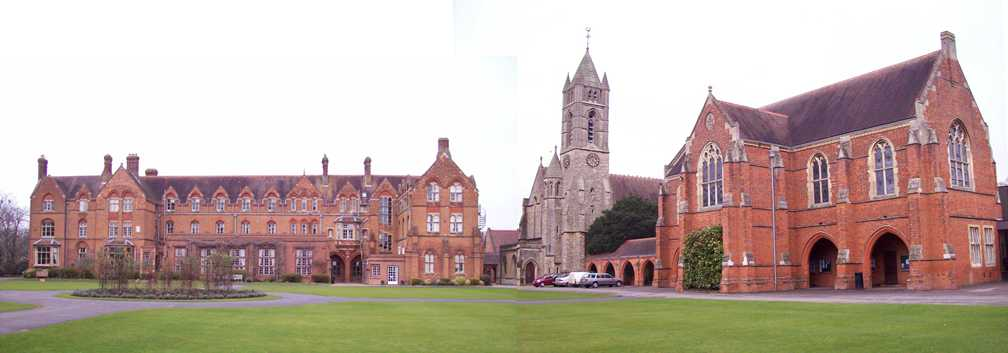

Location
- Woodstock Road; Oxford, Oxfordshire, OX2 7NN; England

Information
- Type: Public school Private boarding and day school
- Motto: Pietas Parentum (Latin: "parental devotion")
- Religious affiliation: Church of England
- Established: 1863
- Founder: Thomas Chamberlain
- Department for Education URN: 123292 Tables
- Chairman of Governors: Christopher Jones
- Warden: Alastair Chirnside
- Staff: c.100
- Gender: Co-educational
- Age: 13 to 18
- Enrolment: 805; Boys:445, Girls:360
- Houses: 13
- Colours: Gold and Cornflower Blue
- Publication: St Edward's Chronicle
- Alumni: Old St Edward's (OSEs)
- Telephone: 01865 319 204
- Boat Club: St Edward's School Boat Club
- Website: stedwardsoxford.org

St Edward's School is a public school (English fee-charging boarding and day school) in Oxford, England, of Victorian provenance. Since the Victorian era, the school has been informally known as 'Teddies'.

It has had a long sporting reputation in rugby, cricket, and rowing, since the 19th century. During the 20th century, and especially during the Second World War, the school became nationally famous for its Royal Air Force officers.

It is a member of the Rugby Group, the Headmasters' and Headmistresses' Conference, and the Oxfordshire Independent and State School Partnership. Its termly fees in 2025/2026 are £18,932 (including VAT) for boarding and £15,866 (including VAT) for day pupils. It teaches GCSE, A Level, and International Baccalaureate (IB) qualifications. Its sixth form is split evenly between pupils studying for A Levels and pupils studying for the IB Diploma.

== History ==
The school was founded, to educate the sons of clergy, in 1863 by Tractarian The Rev. Thomas Chamberlain, who was Senior Student and Honorary Canon of Christ Church, Oxford, and the Vicar of St Thomas the Martyr's Church, Oxford. It is named after St Edward the Martyr, King of England from 975 to 978.

The original school-building was Mackworth Hall, which at that time stood on New Inn Hall Street in central Oxford. In 1873, after a storm damaged its buildings, A. B. Simeon, its first Warden, moved the school to Summertown, which was on the boundary of Oxford and surrounded by farmland, of which Simeon bought a large plot for the school. The school remains on that 100-acre (0.40 km^{2}) site, with its Quadrangle and playing fields on opposite sides of Woodstock Road.

The original buildings were designed by William Wilkinson: the north range was built in 1873 and 1886, the gatehouse in 1879, and the east range, including Big School and the library, in 1881. Wilkinson's most significant building at St Edward's is the chapel, which was built in 1876.

=== Henry Ewing Kendall ===
The school has had a formidable sporting reputation in rugby, cricket, and rowing, since the 19th century. During the 20th century, and especially during the Second World War, the school became nationally famous for its Royal Air Force officers. At the end of the Second World War, the RAF donated a stained-glass window to the school to commemorate 'the superb contribution to the war effort made by former pupils of the School'.

The Rev. Henry Ewing Kendall (1888–1963) was the school's Warden from 1925 to 1954: he was "human, friendly, humorous, convivial" and gave it 29 years of "incessant activity and unswerving devotion". Kendall opined that "if the right standards were established and the right facilities offered, more boys could certainly be attracted from professional families". St Michael's College, Tenbury, and the choir school at All Saints, Margaret Street, were prep schools for St. Edward's.

George Mallaby, who taught at the school from 1924 to 1935, gave his views of Kendall in Each In His Office (1972): at the beginning which he lists Kendall with Norman Brook, H. W. Garrod and Jack Adams, as "four remarkable men".

Kendall succeeded the Rev. William Harold Ferguson, who had moved to Radley College to take over as its Warden from Adam Fox.

=== Later history ===
The school first accepted girl students in 1982 and became fully co-educational in 1995.

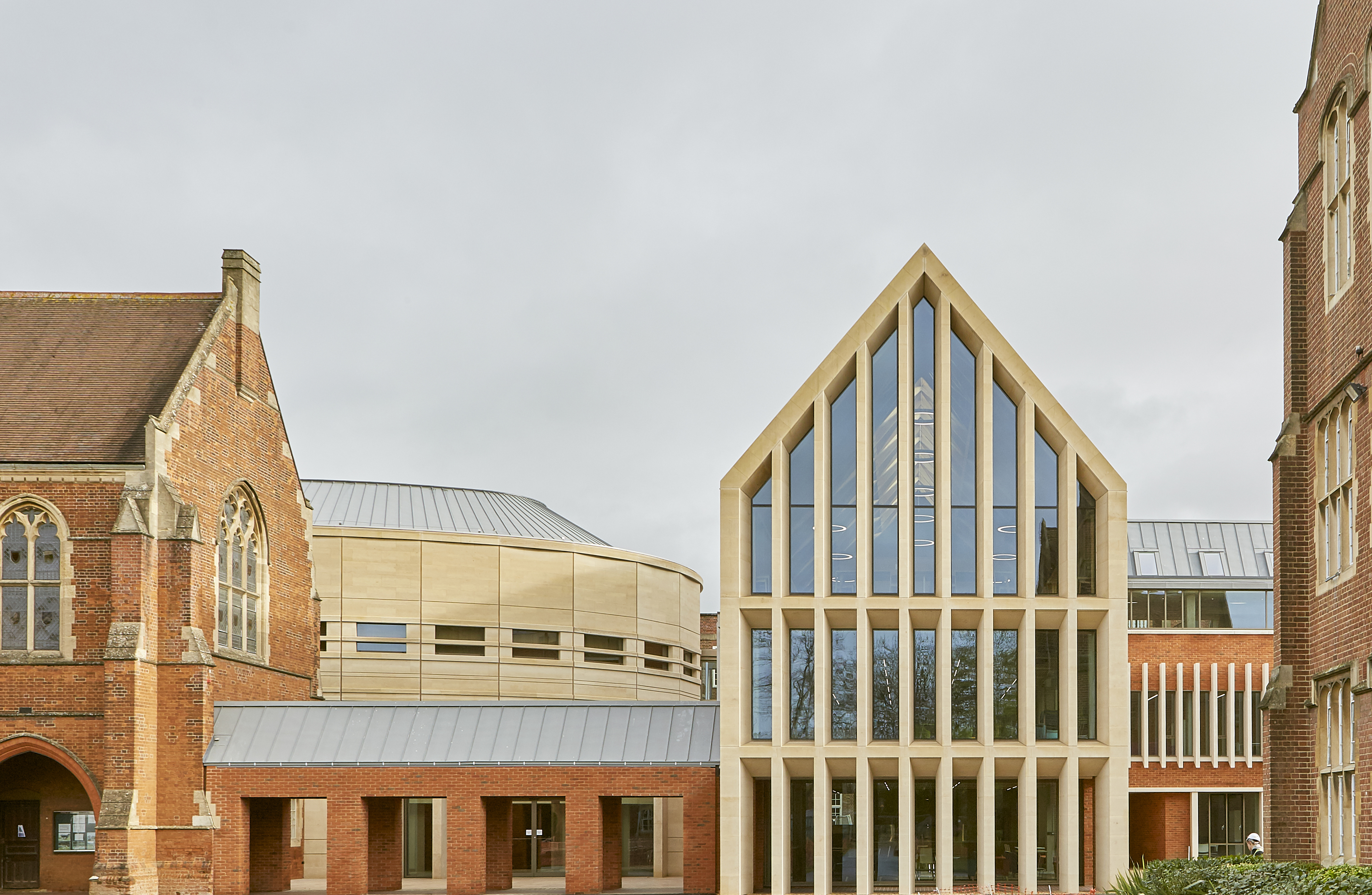

In 2016, the school announced a new building project to complete the school's main Quad. The new development, designed by architect Nick Hardy (TSH Architects) and completed in 2020, includes a purpose-built Library, a university-style academic centre, and a new hall, with a capacity for 1,000 people.

July 2007 marked the official opening of The North Wall Arts Centre. The centre was built on the site of the old school swimming pool, which was the oldest swimming pool in the country. The North Wall Arts Centre is run by Ria Parry and is a producing theatre.

The North Wall Arts Centre won several major architectural awards for its design, including a RIBA award.

The Martyrs Pavilion, designed by architect John Pawson, was opened in 2009 and won the 2010 Oxford Preservation Trust award in the New Buildings category.

== Sport ==
The sports on offer for girls include rowing, cricket, hockey, football, netball and tennis, while the main sports offered for the boys include rowing, rugby, hockey, cricket, football and tennis. The school has over 90 acres (360,000 m^{2}) of playing fields in North Oxford.

One of the school's IVs warming up at the 2006 National Schools Regatta

In rowing the St Edward's School Boat Club has won The Princess Elizabeth Challenge Cup at Henley Royal Regatta on five occasions, more than any other British school except Eton College and St Paul's School, London. In 1984 the 1st VIII became the first crew to achieve the 'Triple', winning all three school events that year: The School's Head of the River; The Queen Mother Cup at the National Schools Regatta; and The Princess Elizabeth Challenge Cup at Henley Royal Regatta. In 2013 the boys' 1st VIII boat rowed in the fastest Princess Elizabeth Challenge Cup final ever seen at Henley, chasing the holders Abingdon School down to within half a length. Both crews beat the existing course record. In 2014, the boys' 1st VIII were again the losing finalists. The school has won Henley events eight times (including three years as winners of the now-discontinued Special Race for Schools), and been the losing finalist seven times.

In 2023, St Edward's School became the first co-educational school to win Gold in Championship events for both boys' and girls' crews in the same National Schools' Regatta, winning the Jim Mason Plate for Girls' Coxed Fours (for the second time) and the Queen Mother Challenge Cup for Boys' Eights (for the fourth time).

== Notable alumni ==
Former pupils of St Edward's are known as Old St Edwardians (which is abbreviated to 'OSE').

Notable OSE include:

- Douglas Bader, WWII pilot
- Arthur Banks, WWII pilot awarded GC
- David Frederick Case, audiobook narrator
- Geoffrey de Havilland, founder of de Havilland Aircraft Company.
- George Fenton, Oscar nominated film composer
- James Forrester, England rugby union international
- Guy Gibson VC, Dambusters hero,
- Kenneth Grahame, author
- Mark Herdman, diplomat, Governor of the British Virgin Islands (1986–1991)
- Laurence Olivier, actor, director and producer
- Hugh Padgham, record producer
- Emilia Clarke, actor
- Florence Pugh, actor
- Georgia Tennant, actor
- Jon Snow, Channel 4 newscaster
- Louis Strange, WW1 pilot
- Stephen Tumim, judge
- Sam Waley-Cohen, Grand National and Cheltenham Gold Cup winning jockey
- Adrian Warburton DFC, World War II British pilot
- John Berger, art critic, novelist, painter and poet
- Leia Zhu, violinist

=== Notable masters ===
Notable masters of the school include:

- James Cope, first-class cricketer (former master in charge of cricket)
- David Conner, Dean of Windsor; former Bishop to the Forces (former school Chaplain)
- A. Maitland Emmet, became one of Britain's foremost authorities on microlepidoptera
- Richard Howitt, cricketer (former master in charge of cricket)
- Sir George Mallaby, public servant (former housemaster)

== Arms ==
The school received a grant of arms in December 2017.

Coat of arms of St Edward's School, Oxford
Crest Upon a Helm with a Wreath Argent and Azure Issuant from a Cup Or a Dagger erect point downwards Argent hilt and pommel Or. Escutcheon Azure a Cross flory between four Ancient Crowns impaling Per fess Sable and Or a Pale counterchanged in the Or an Ermine Spot Sable and in the Sable a Trefoil slipped Or the whole within a Bordure also Or. Motto Pietas Parentum Badge Issuant from a Cup Or a Dagger erect downwards Argent hilt and pommel Or.
