= Rennie Fritchie, Baroness Fritchie =

British life peer (1942–2026)

The Right Honourable The Baroness Fritchie DBE

Member of the House of Lords
- Lord Temporal
- Life peerage 31 May 2005 – 1 July 2024

Personal details
- Born: 29 April 1942 Fife, Scotland
- Died: 12 March 2026 (aged 83)

Irene Tordoff Fritchie, Baroness Fritchie, DBE (née Fennell; 29 April 1942 – 12 March 2026), known as Rennie Fritchie, was a British life peer who was a member of the House of Lords.

== Early life and career ==
Irene Tordoff Fennell was born on 29 April 1942, the daughter of Mr. and Mrs. Charles Frederick Fennell. She was educated at Ribston Hall Grammar School for Girls in Gloucester and had had a long career specialising in training and development. Now described as a "portfolio" worker, she held various positions, including Commissioner for Public Appointments from 1999 to 2005, and President of the Pennell Initiative for Women's Health in Later Life.

In the 1970s, she was one of the first full-time women's training advisers and pioneered the training of staff in the then new Equal Opportunities Commission. Using a German Marshall Fellowship awarded in 1985, she drew lessons from the United States of America for the United Kingdom for programmes to improve the status of women. She has published extensively on these topics and contributed regularly on them to programmes on television and radio. She became Chairman of Nominet in 2010.

== Affiliations ==
She held a number of positions outside government. She held an honorary Professorship in Creative Leadership at York University and was Pro-Chancellor at Southampton University, a Civil Service Commissioner and Vice-Chair of the Stroud and Swindon Building Society. She was active in a number of charities, Fritchie has been awarded honorary degrees by a number of academic institutions. Fritchie was Chair of the 2gether NHS Foundation Trust in Gloucestershire, and in 2012 was appointed the new chancellor of the University of Gloucestershire.

== Personal life and death ==
In 1960, she married Don Jamie Fritchie with whom she had two children, the elder dying in 1991. She was widowed in 1992. Baroness Fritchie died on 12 March 2026, at the age of 83.

== Honours ==
Fritchie became a Dame Commander of the Order of the British Empire in the 1996 New Year Honours.

On 31 May 2005, Fritchie was made a life peer as Baroness Fritchie, of Gloucester in the County of Gloucestershire, and she sat as a crossbencher in the House of Lords. Fritchie retired from the House of Lords on 1 July 2024.

== Arms ==
Coat of arms of Rennie Fritchie, Baroness Fritchie

Adopted
2007
Coronet
Coronet of a Baroness
Escutcheon
Argent three Barrulets fracted and there conjoined to a Chevronel Gules each ensigning a Labrador's Face Sable
Supporters
On either side a Gloucester Cow Gules the head and legs Sable the horns lower spine tail and underparts Argent in the mouth a Rose also Argent barbed seeded leaved and slipped Or
Motto
MAKE A DIFFERENCE
Badge
A Cross Crosslet Gules each limb terminating in a thistle head also Gules flowered Or
Symbolism
The Arms take three chevronels from the Arms of the County Council of Gloucestershire and combine these with barrulets as an allusion to the law. The feminine symbol has been used in the Badge where four of them have been conjoined. The roundel of each symbol has then formed the base of a thistle head as an allusion to Scotland.

Academic offices
Preceded by Vacant since 2010	Chancellor of the University of Gloucestershire; 2012–2022	Succeeded by Michael Bichard, Baron Bichard
