= Kenneth Clucas =

English civil servant

Sir Kenneth Henry Clucas KCB FRSA (18 November 1921 – 27 August 2010) was an English civil servant. After retiring in 1982, he served as chairman of the National Association of Citizens Advice Bureaux.

== Early life and education ==
He was born in Faversham, Kent, the son of Rev. John Henry Clucas, a Methodist minister, and his wife, Ethel Sim. He was educated at Kingswood School in Bath, where he became head boy. His education was interrupted by the Second World War. Called up at age 19, he served as an officer in the Royal Signals from 1941 to 1946. He was mentioned in dispatches, which he insisted was not for any braveness against the enemy but for a "bold effort to sort out organisational weaknesses in the Signals Office."

Following the war, he went to Emmanuel College, Cambridge, to read English literature. However, his university life was cut short when he was successful in the Civil Service exam, which he sat for entry to the Administrative Class. The Civil Service Commission would not permit him to stay on at Cambridge, but fortunately for him, the Ministry of Labour allowed him to remain at Cambridge long enough to sit a special exam and gain a first-class degree.

== Career ==
After joining the Ministry of Labour in 1948, he was posted to the British Embassy in Cairo in 1950, serving as Assistant Labour Attaché before joining HM Treasury in 1952 as a principle. Over the next decade, he rose from to the rank of Deputy Secretary after outstanding performance in three high-profile posts. After serving as Principal Private Secretary to the Minister of Labour, from 1962 to 1966, he was head of the division responsible for legislation introducing widespread changes in industrial training. He then served as Secretary of the National Board for Prices and Incomes (NBPI) from 1968 to 1970, an "extremely critical period" for the economic management.

Clucas served as First Civil Service Commissioner (1971–1974), followed by Permanent Secretary of the Department of Prices and Consumer Protection (1974–1979) and Permanent Secretary of the Department of Trade and Industry (1979–1982).

He retired from the Civil Service in 1982.

In 1984, Clucas chaired the Nuffield Foundation pharmacy inquiry.

== Honours ==
Clucas was appointed a Companion of the Order of the Bath in the 1969 New Year Honours. He was knighted in the same order in the 1976 New Year Honours.

== Personal life ==
In 1960, Clucas married Barbara Hunter, eldest daughter of Rear-Admiral Raymond Paul Hunter of the U.S. Navy. They had two daughters: Jill Amanda (born 1967) and Susan Alison (born 1971).

He died aged 88, after suffering from Parkinson's disease.

Government offices
Preceded by John Hunt	First Civil Service Commissioner; 1971–1973	Succeeded by Fergus Allen
