= John Holroyd (civil servant) =

English public servant

John Hepworth Holroyd, CB, CVO, DL (10 April 1935 – 29 November 2014) was an English public servant. Educated at Worcester College, Oxford, he entered the civil service in 1959. After chairing the Civil Service Selection Board (1978–80) and serving in Ministry of Agriculture, Fisheries and Food and in the Cabinet Office, he was the First Civil Service Commissioner from 1989 to 1993. He was then Secretary for Appointments to the Prime Minister and Ecclesiastical Secretary to the Lord Chancellor from 1993 to 1999. Active in the Church of England, he was a lay reader at St Albans Cathedral from 1975 to 2001, and then Gloucester Cathedral from 2001 until his death.

Government offices
Preceded by Dennis Trevelyan	First Civil Service Commissioner; 1989–1993	Succeeded by Ann Bowtell
Preceded by Sir Robin Catford	Prime Minister's Appointments Secretary; 1993–1999	Succeeded by William Chapman
