= James Cope (cricketer) =

English cricketer

Personal information
- Full name: James Edward Bailye Cope
- Born: 5 May 1966 (age 60); Leigh-on-Sea, Essex, England
- Batting: Right-handed
- Role: Wicket-keeper

Domestic team information
- Years: Team
- 1986–1988: Oxford University

Career statistics
Competition	First-class
Matches	12
Runs scored	28
Batting average	4.00
100s/50s	–/–
Top score	8*
Catches/stumpings	13/1
- Source: Cricinfo, 12 February 2020

James Edward Bailye Cope (born 5 May 1966) is an English schoolteacher and former first-class cricketer.

Cope was born at Leigh-on-Sea in May 1966. He was educated at St John's School in Leatherhead, before going up to Keble College, Oxford. While studying at Oxford, he played first-class cricket for Oxford University, making his debut against Gloucestershire at Oxford in 1986. He played first-class cricket for Oxford until 1988, making a total of twelve appearances. Playing as a wicket-keeper, he scored 28 runs and took 13 catches and made a single stumping.

After graduating from Oxford, Cope became a teacher. His early roles were in Africa, where he taught in schools in Namibia, Kenya and Togo, in addition to working for the University of Khartoum in Sudan. Upon his return to England, he was employed in state schools, before joining the staff of St Edward's School, Oxford in 2001. He is currently the Deputy Head Pastoral at St Edward's, in addition to being the master in charge of cricket.
