= Roderick Meiklejohn =

Sir Roderick Sinclair Meiklejohn, KBE, CB (30 May 1876 – 18 January 1962) was an English civil servant. Educated at Hertford College, Oxford, he entered the civil service in 1899; initially serving in the War Office, from 1902 he was in HM Treasury. From 1928 to 1939, he was First Civil Service Commissioner.

Government offices
Preceded by Sir Stanley Mordaunt Leathes	First Civil Service Commissioner; 1928–1939	Succeeded by Sir Percival Waterfield
