= Stanley Mordaunt Leathes =

Sir Stanley Mordaunt Leathes KCB (7 May 1861 – 25 July 1938) was a British poet, economist, historian and senior Civil Service administrator, being the First Civil Service Commissioner from 1910 to 1927.

== Early life ==
Leathes was born in London, the eldest son of the Hebrew scholar Stanley Leathes and his wife Matilda (née Butt). His younger brother was John Beresford Leathes, a distinguished physiologist who was elected a Fellow of the Royal Society in 1911.

== Academic career ==
Stanley Mordaunt Leathes was educated at Eton College between 1873 and 1880, holding a King's Scholarship. On leaving Eton, he went up to Trinity College, Cambridge, where in 1882 he was awarded a First in part one of the Classical Tripos and in 1884 another First in part two. Also in 1884 he received a notable prize, second Chancellor's Gold Medal. and took the degree of BA. While at Cambridge Leathes became a member of a small society of friends known as the T. A. F.; this was made up of members of King's College and Trinity College, who would meet every Sunday evening for supper. Other members included James Kenneth Stephen, Walter George Headlam, M. R. James, and Henry Babington Smith. In 1886 Leathes was elected a Fellow of Trinity and in 1888 proceeded by seniority to the degree of MA. He was a lecturer in History at his college from 1892 to 1903.

In June 1902, he was appointed deputy to Lord Acton, Regius Professor of Modern History, who died only a week later. Leathes had helped Lord Acton plan the Cambridge Modern History, and with A. W. Ward and G. W. Prothero edited it between 1901 and 1912. During this time Leathes enjoyed riding and hunting, frequently joining the Cambridgeshire hounds. For some years he was editor of the Proceedings of the Cambridge Antiquarian Society, of which he was an active member.

== Civil servant ==
Leathes left Cambridge on his appointment as Secretary to the General Board of Studies from 1900 to 1903, becoming Secretary to the Civil Service Commission in 1903. In 1907 he became a Commissioner, eventually becoming First Commissioner, a post he held from 1910 until his retirement in 1927. He served as Chairman of various government committees on special questions, including a ground-breaking committee reporting in 1918 set up to investigate the teaching of modern languages in the UK which was responsible for moving from the teaching of ancient languages in schools such as Greek and Latin to modern European languages. From January to November 1918 he was Establishment Officer in the Ministry of Food, placing him in charge of essential war work during World War I, being responsible for staffing and accommodation in the Ministry of Food. He was appointed CB in 1911 and KCB in 1919.

He never married, and on leaving Cambridge he lived for a period in the Temple in London, later sharing a house with the Revd J. A. Nairn near Maidenhead in Berkshire.

Sir Stanley Mordaunt Leathes died at Barnwood House, a nursing home near Gloucester, on 25 July 1938.

== Publications ==
Leathes's publications include Vox Clamantis: Essays on Collectivism (1911) under the pseudonym Numa Minimus; under his own name he published Eton: Life in College (1881), edited A Grace Book Containing the Proctors' Accounts and Other Records of the University of Cambridge for the years 1454–1488 (1897), The Claims of the Old Testament (1897), The People of England (3 vols., 1915–23), The Teaching of English at the Universities (1913), What is Education? (1913) and Rhythm in English Poetry (1935).

Government offices
Preceded by Lord Francis Hervey	First Civil Service Commissioner; 1910–1927	Succeeded by Sir Roderick Meiklejohn
