= Janet Gaymer =

British civil servant and lawyer (born 1947)

Dame Janet Marion Gaymer, DBE, KC (Hon.) (born 11 July 1947) served from January 2006 to December 2010 as a Civil Service Commissioner and Commissioner for Public Appointments, regulating ministerial appointments to designated public bodies in England, Wales and Northern Ireland.

== Career ==
She was previously senior partner of Simmons & Simmons, an international law firm, as well as Chair of the Employment Tribunal System Taskforce and a member of the Employment Tribunals Service Steering Board. She has chaired the Law Society's Committee on Employment Law and the Employment Law Sub-Committee of the City of London Solicitors Company. She was the founder chairman and is now life vice-president of the UK Employment Lawyers' Association. She is also the founder chairman and now honorary chairman of the European Employment Lawyers' Association. She was a member of the Council of the Advisory, Conciliation and Arbitration Service and chaired of its Audit Committee between 1995 and 2001.

== Affiliations ==
She is an Honorary Fellow of St Hilda's College, Oxford, an Honorary Doctor of Laws of the University of Nottingham (where she is a "Special Professor"), an Honorary Doctor of the University of Surrey and a Governor of the London School of Economics. She became a Governor of the Royal Shakespeare Company in 1999.

== Family ==
She is married with two children.

== Honours ==
Already Commander of the Order of the British Empire (CBE), Gaymer was appointed Dame Commander of the Order of the British Empire (DBE) in the 2010 Birthday Honours.
