= Len Peach =

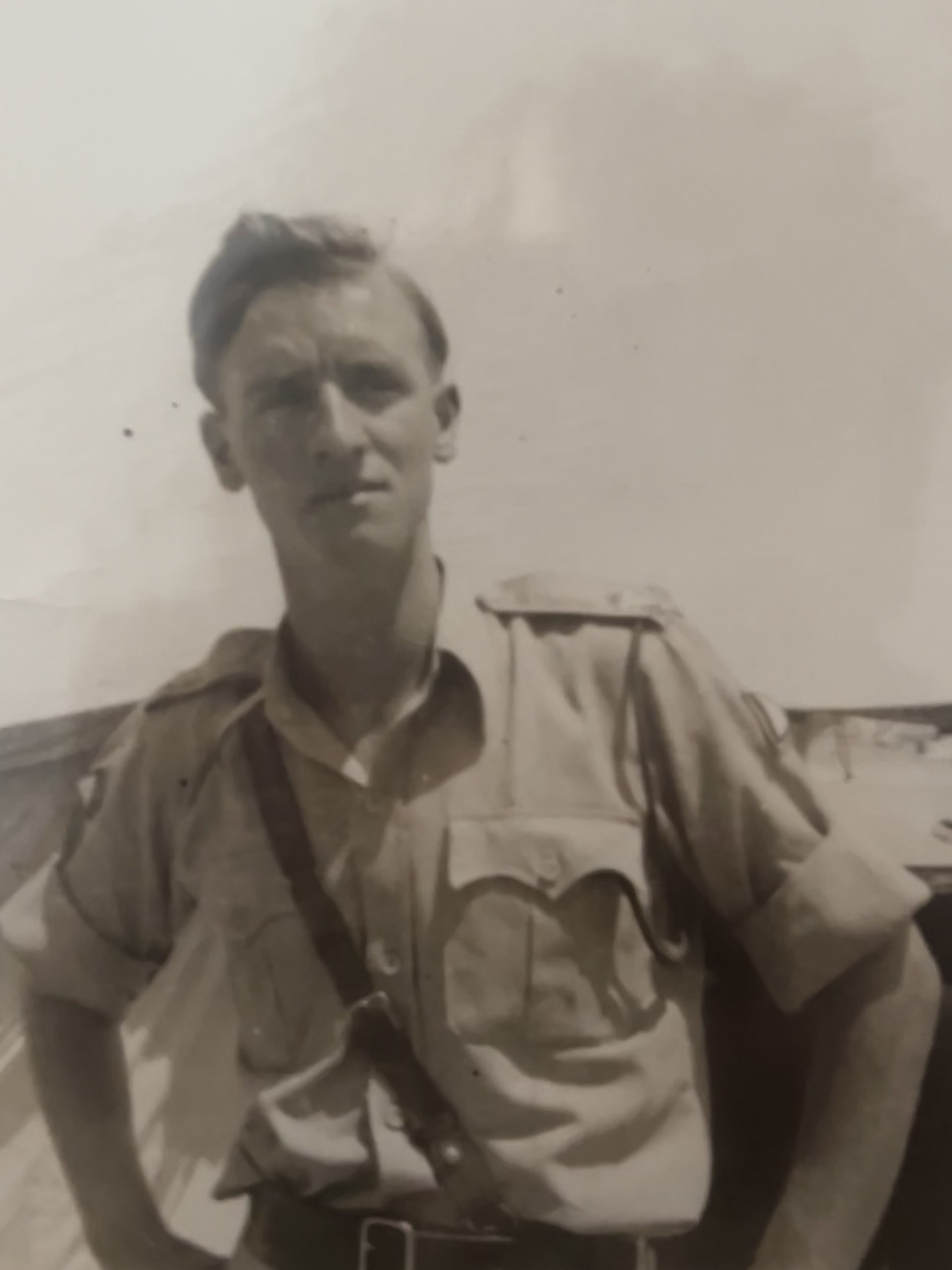
Len in the Sudanese Canal Zone with the Lancashire Regiment (1953).

Sir Leonard Harry Peach (17 December 1932 – 5 August 2016) was Chief Executive of the National Health Service from 1986 to 1989.

He was born in Walsall in December 1932 to Henry and Beatrice Peach as the eldest of six children, one of whom died at a young age. After the Second World War he was enlisted for National Service, achieving the rank of Second Lieutenant in the Lancashire Regiment. He would rejoin the army in 1961, this time the Territorial Army, obtaining the rank of Captain in the South Staffordshire Regiment. After his time in the Lancashire Regiment he studied history at Pembroke College, Oxford. He was subsequently sponsored by his employer, John Thompsons of Wolverhampton, to study management at the London School of Economics and then joined the West Midlands Gas Board. In 1961 he moved to IBM where he rose to be Head of Personnel and Corporate Affairs for the UK. He was President of the Institute of Personnel Management from 1983–85.

The NHS Management Board was established by Norman Fowler as a result of the Griffiths Report on NHS. In 1985 he was seconded to the Department of Health as to serve as Director of Personnel on the Board and was appointed Chief Executive in November 1986. Announced in the 1989 Birthday Honours, Peach was knighted on 22 November 1989. He returned to IBM in 1989 and when he retired in 1992 he became Chairman of the Police Complaints Authority and later Commissioner for Public Appointments.

Sir Leonard Peach died on 5 August 2016 at the age of 83. He left 2 sons and 5 Grandchildren.
