= George Mallaby (public servant) =

British Army officer

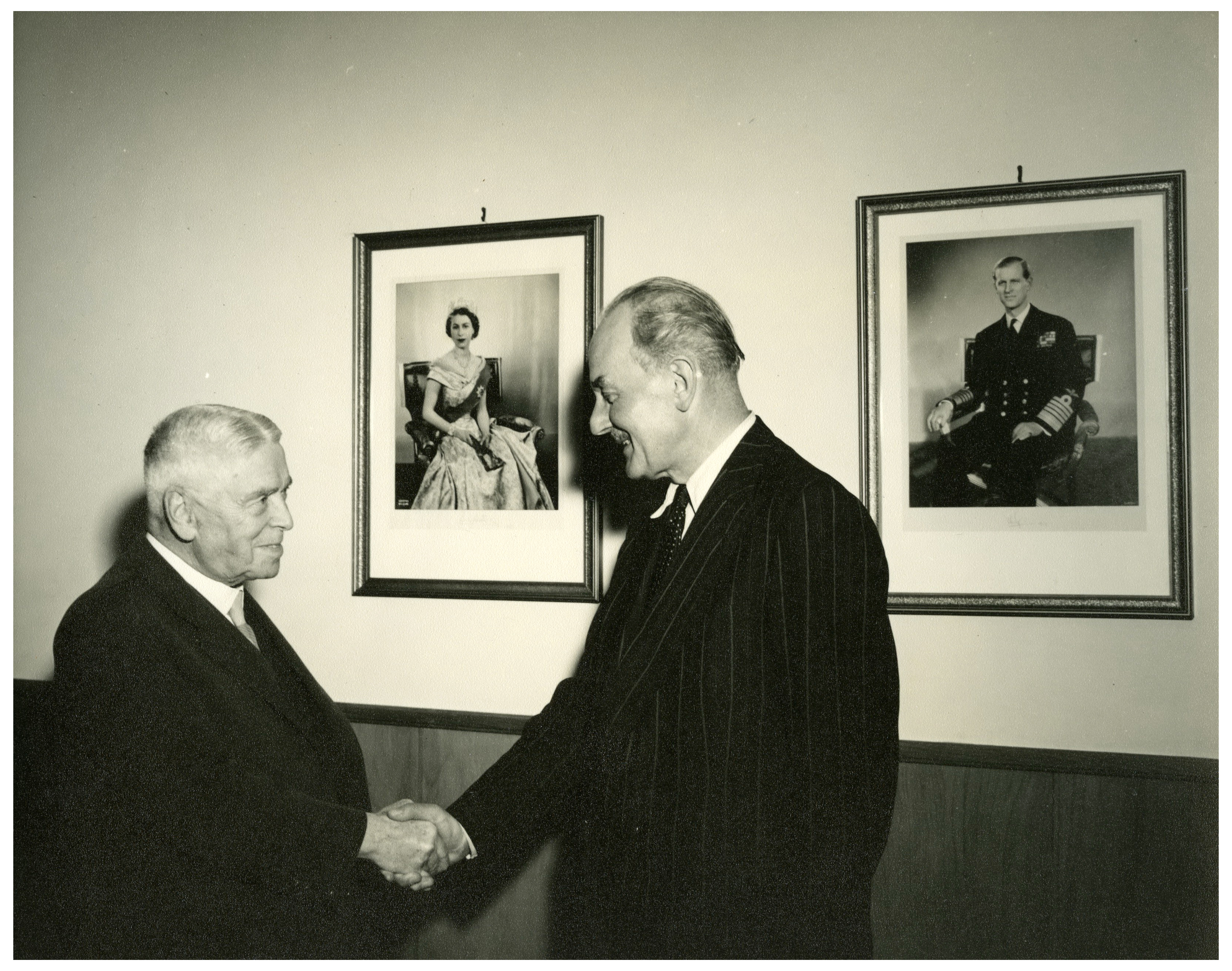
Mallaby (right) with New Zealand Prime Minister Walter Nash, 13 August 1959.

Sir Howard George Charles Mallaby KCMG OBE (17 February 1902 – 18 December 1978), was an English schoolmaster and public servant. He received the US Legion of Merit in 1946 and was knighted in 1958. From 1957 to 1959, he was the British High Commissioner to New Zealand.

== Early life and family ==
Born in 1902 at Worthing, Mallaby was the youngest child of actor and acting company manager William Calthorpe Mallaby (né William Calthorpe Deeley- his father had insisted on a stage name; d. 1912) and his wife Katharine Mary Frances Miller. He was educated at Radley College and Merton College, Oxford, where he was a classicist and an exhibitioner. At Radley, he was Cadet CSM of the school's Officer Training Corps. At Oxford, he graduated BA in 1923 and MA in 1935.

Mallaby's parents had married in 1893 and he had one elder brother, Aubertin Walter Sothern Mallaby (born 1899), and one sister, Mary Katharine Helen Mallaby. The children's maternal grandparents were George Miller CB (born 1833), Assistant Secretary in the Education Department and a member of the Athenaeum Club, and his wife Mary Elizabeth, daughter of the Rev. Peter Aubertin; while their great-grandfather was the Rev. Sir Thomas Combe Miller, 6th Baronet (1781–1864). Mallaby's great-uncles on this side of his family included Sir Charles Hayes Miller, 7th Baronet (1829–1868) and Sir Henry John Miller (1830–1918), who became Speaker of the New Zealand Legislative Council.

== Career ==
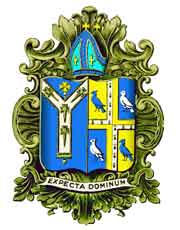
Arms of St Bees, where Mallaby was headmaster

After a year of teaching at Clifton College, Mallaby became a master at St Edward's School, Oxford, in 1924. In 1926, health problems took him to South Africa, where he taught at the Diocesan College, Rondebosch. In 1927 he returned to St Edward's, where he became a housemaster in 1931. On 22 September 1933 was commissioned as a Second Lieutenant of the school's Officer Training Corps, resigning his commission on 7 March 1936. He was an exceptional schoolmaster, teaching literature as well as classics, and also coached rugby football. At St Edward's one of the boys he taught was Robert Gittings, later a poet and biographer, who after Mallaby's death wrote an article on him for the Oxford Dictionary of National Biography. From 1935 to 1938 Mallaby was headmaster of St Bees School in Cumberland, and in 1938 he took the first step towards a new career in the public service by becoming District Commissioner for the special area of west Cumberland, with the task of alleviating the problem of unemployment.

During the Second World War, Mallaby was briefly deputy regional transport commissioner for the north-western region of England. Late in 1940 he became a general staff officer at the War Office, and in 1942 was posted to the Joint Planning Staff, becoming its secretary the next year. In this role he attended conferences of the Great Powers at Cairo (November, 1943), Quebec (September, 1944), and Potsdam (July to August, 1945).

Mallaby was commissioned onto the British Army's general staff list as a Second Lieutenant on 6 December 1940, promoted Captain and Major in 1941, Lieutenant-Colonel in 1943, and Colonel in 1945.

With the end of the war, he was secretary of the National Trust for a year until 1946, then an assistant secretary in the Ministry of Defence, and from 1948 to 1950 secretary-general of the Western Union Defence Organisation, a forerunner of NATO. In 1950, he became an under-secretary in the Cabinet Office and a key civil servant in British foreign and defence policy. In 1954, at the time of the Mau Mau Uprising, he went to Kenya as secretary of the war council and council of ministers. From 1955 to 1957 he was deputy secretary of the University Grants Committee, then from 1957 to 1959 a diplomat, as High Commissioner of the United Kingdom in New Zealand, and in 1959 became first civil service commissioner in charge of recruitment to H. M. Civil Service and the Diplomatic Service, a role which later brought him work as a private recruitment consultant.

== Retirement ==
In 1964, Mallaby retired to live in East Anglia and was elected an Extraordinary Fellow of Churchill College, Cambridge, graduating Master of Arts of Cambridge in 1965.

In 1967 he chaired a committee on local government officers, which led to The Mallaby Report. In 1971, he chaired the Hong Kong government's Salaries Commission, and in 1972 to 1973 chaired a special committee on the structure of the Rugby Football Union, which led to a change in the rule for kicking to touch which is said to have revived the game.

Mallaby also became a governor of St Edward's School, Oxford, chairman of the Council of Radley College, and vice-chairman of Bedford College, London.

== Publications ==
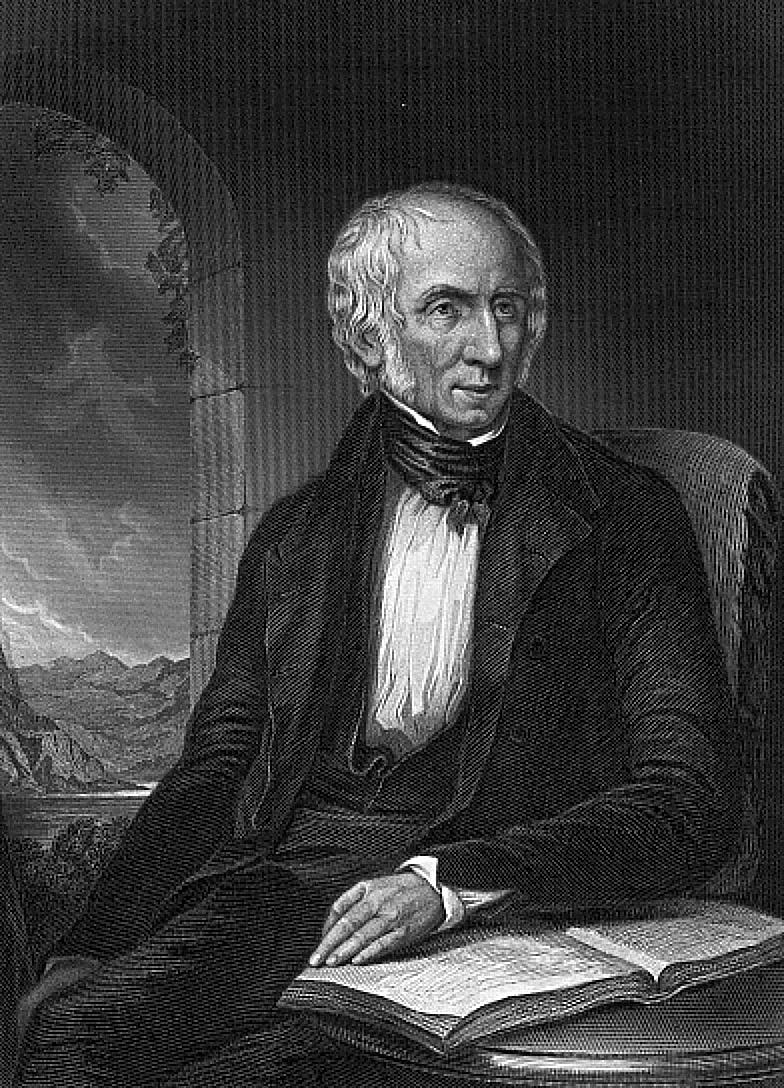
Wordsworth

In 1932, Mallaby edited a selection of William Wordsworth's poems for the Cambridge University Press, in which he included two thousand lines of The Prelude. In 1950, the centenary of Wordsworth's death, he wrote a critical biography, Wordsworth: a Tribute, and in 1970 he edited Poems by William Wordsworth for the Folio Society, with an introduction. From my Level (1965) and Each in his Office (1972) are memoirs of his own life.

His last publication was a booklet, Local Government Councillors: their Motives and Manners (1976), in which he quoted Charles Lamb and Samuel Johnson.

== Personal life ==
On 2 April 1955, Mallaby married Elizabeth Greenwood Locker, a daughter of Hubert Edward Brooke, a banker, and the widow of J. W. D. Locker, gaining one stepson and two stepdaughters.

He died at home in Chevington, Suffolk, on 18 December 1978.

== Honours ==
- Officer of the Order of the British Empire, 1945
- Member of the Legion of Merit (USA), January 1946
- Companion of the Order of St Michael and St George, 1953
- Knight Commander of the Order of St Michael and St George, 1958

== Likenesses ==
One portrait of Mallaby is in the collections of the National Portrait Gallery, London, and is described as a vintage print by Elliott & Fry (fl. 1864–1963) in the Photographs Collection.

Diplomatic posts
Preceded by General Sir Geoffrey Scoones	High Commissioner to New Zealand; 1957–1959	Succeeded by Sir Francis Cumming-Bruce
Government offices
Preceded by Sir Laurence Helsby	First Civil Service Commissioner; 1959–1964	Succeeded by Sir George Abell
