= Hans Juda =

British designer

Hans Juda OBE
- Born: 25 September 1904; Trier, Germany
- Died: 1975 (aged 70–71); London, England
- Education: Ludwig-Maximilians-Universität München; University of Frankfurt am Main; University of Freiburg
- Occupations: Publisher, businessman, writer and designer
- Spouse: Elsbeth Juda

Hans Peter Juda (25 September 1904 – 1975) was a British publisher, businessman, writer and designer.

Hans Peter Juda was born in Trier on 25 September 1904. He was educated at the Ludwig-Maximilians-Universität München, the University of Frankfurt am Main, and the University of Freiburg.

He lived in Berlin where he was a financial editor at the Berliner Tageblatt. In 1933, the SS stormed his apartment building while he was at work and began burning books. Having been tipped off by a friend at the Ministry that he was on a list of intellectuals to be targeted, he and his wife fled for London that very evening with two suitcases, one of clothes, one of books, and his violin.

In London, he was the founding publisher and editor of the trade magazine The Ambassador, which promoted British exports.

He was married to the photographer Elsbeth Juda. Aged seven, Elsbeth threw a snowball at the fourteen-year-old Hans who put her over his knee in mock anger. She immediately said to herself, "If I ever marry anyone, it will be him", and aged 21 she replied by telegram to his proposal: "Confirm. Oui."

From at least 1939 to 1942, he was living at 8 Holland Villas Road, London W14, and was classified by the Home Office under "Internees at Liberty in the UK", being of German origin, but not posing a sufficient security risk to merit internment.

In 1954, Graham Sutherland worked partly from photographs of Winston Churchill taken by his wife Elsbeth Juda, for Portrait of Winston Churchill (Sutherland), and after the finished work met with the subject's disapproval, Hans Juda offered to take the painting. After two days in the Judas' London house, it was sent back to Chartwell; it is surmised that Churchill felt guilty about giving away the portrait. In the 1955 Birthday Honours, he was made an Officer of the Order of the British Empire (OBE).

In 1965, he was awarded the Bicentenary Medal of the Royal Society of Arts (for those who "in a manner other than as industrial designers have exerted an exceptional influence on promoting art and design in British industry"), for his work as editor and publisher of The Ambassador.

In 1966, Juda was elected chairman of London's Central School of Art and Design.

In 1967, Sotheby's in London held an auction including "Modern british and continental paintings, drawings and sculpture the property of Mr. and Mrs Hans Juda".

He died in London in 1975.

His fabric designs for Heal's are in the permanent collections of the V&A and the Minneapolis Institute of Art. There are three photographs of him in the permanent collection of the National Portrait Gallery.

His archives are held in the Center for Jewish History in New York City.
