= Goalen =

Goalen is a surname. Notable people with the surname include:

- Barbara Goalen (1921–2002), British model
- Gerard Goalen (1918–1999), British architect
