= Grace Hamblin =

Grace Hamblin OBE
- Born: Grace Hamblin; 1 January 1908; Kent, England
- Died: 15 October 2002 (aged 94); Westerham, Kent, England
- Occupation: Secretary
- Known for: Private secretary to Sir Winston and Clementine Churchill
- Children: None

Grace Hamblin OBE (1 January 1908 – 15 October 2002) served as secretary to both Winston Churchill and Lady Clementine Churchill from the early 1930s, until their deaths. She subsequently served as the first curator at Chartwell, the Churchills' country home in Kent.

== Life ==
Hamblin was born in Kent in 1908, the daughter of the head gardener at an estate adjacent to Chartwell. Joining Churchill's staff as a junior secretary in 1932, in 1940 she moved with the Churchills to Downing Street, becoming private secretary to Clementine Churchill. Hamblin received the OBE in Churchill's resignation honours list in 1955. In 1965, she was one of the very few non-family members invited to attend Churchill's interment at St Martin's Church, Bladon. (Note: Churchill bequeathed Hamblin the sum of £500 in his will.) Hamblin became the first administrator when Chartwell was opened to the public by the National Trust in 1966, and, in conjunction with Lady Churchill and her daughter Mary Soames, was largely responsible for the organisation and arrangement of the house following Churchill's death. Robin Fedden, Deputy Director-General of the Trust and author of the first guidebook to Chartwell, recorded her 33 years service to the Churchill family and to the house. Famously discreet throughout her life, Hamblin achieved some notoriety in 2015 when her leading role in the destruction of Graham Sutherland's portrait of Churchill was revealed. Presented to Churchill by the Houses of Lords and Commons as an 80th birthday present, the realistic portrait was detested by both Churchill and his wife and, acting on Lady Churchill's instructions, Hamblin and her brother removed the painting from Chartwell at some point in the mid-1950s and burnt it. Hamblin retired from the post of Administrator at Chartwell in 1973.

Hamblin died in 2002 at her home at Westerham, Kent, which she had bought with funds from the sale of one of Churchill's own paintings. A collection of her papers, mainly consisting of notes for speeches she gave about her life with the Churchills, is held at the Churchill Archives Centre at Churchill College, Cambridge.

== Sources ==
- Fedden, Robin (1974). Churchill And Chartwell. Oxford: Pergamon Press. OCLC 228659396.
- Garnett, Oliver (2008). Chartwell. Swindon: National Trust Enterprises. OCLC 828689009.
- Stelzer, Cita (2019). Working With Winston: The Unsung Women Behind Britain's Greatest Statesman. London: Head of Zeus. ISBN 978-1-786-69587-1.
