= Barbara Goalen =

British fashion model (1921–2002)

- Barbara Goalen, 1954, by John French
- Born: Barbara Kathleen Bach; 1 January 1921; Malaya
- Died: 16 June 2002 (aged 81); Putney, London
- Occupation: Model
- Years active: 1947–1954
- Spouse(s): Ian Goalen (1945–47), Nigel Campbell (1954–95)
- Children: 4

Barbara Goalen (1 January 1921 – 16 June 2002) was a British model who came to international prominence between 1945 and 1954, then gave up her career at the height of her success. Described as "the most photographed woman in Britain" and "arguably the first British supermodel", she epitomised post-war glamour and modelled for both Dior and Balenciaga.

== Early life ==
Barbara Bach was born in British Malaya where her father, John Frederick Noel Bach, was a rubber plantation owner. She was sent back to the UK to prep school at the age of eight, moving on to St Mary's School in Calne, Wiltshire as a boarder. She spent a year studying art, giving this up to become an ambulance driver when war broke out. Her engagement to an RAF pilot ended when he was killed in action. She then married commercial pilot Ian Goalen who was killed in a plane crash in 1947, leaving her with a son and daughter.

== Modelling career ==
Goalen became a model at the age of 24, with her mother taking care of her two young children. She said: "I didn't have to work for money, but I needed to for myself". While she also remarked – perhaps not entirely seriously – that it was a choice of that or taking in washing, even in austere post-war Britain good models could earn five guineas an hour – equivalent to the weekly wage for many working women of the time. Perks of the job included being treated as members of society, the loan of designer clothes and entrance to any event. Initially Goalen worked as a couture model and accepted every modelling commission, but later was to make her fee four times that of other models and restrict her appearances in order to be more 'exclusive'.

Her elegant wasp-waisted shape was the perfect fit for the post-war 'New Look' fashions and she had what Vogue has described as the "mink and diamonds" look, thanks in part to her gamine short haircut (later more bouffant), arched and elongated eyebrows and high cheekbones. She said: "I was seven and a half stone and my measurements were: charlies 33, waist 18 – yes really – and hips 31".

Early on in her career, she became a favourite of Vogue photographer Clifford Coffin and was also to work with leading fashion names such as Norman Parkinson and Anthony Denney. Her big break came when she met photographer John French. From 1950, she made frequent appearances in the pages of Vogue and Harper's Bazaar. She also became among the first British models to be employed by French couture houses – notably Balenciaga and pioneer of the 'New Look' Dior ' – as well as modelling in New York and Australia. She was among the models chosen for a series of influential photoshoots by Elsbeth Juda for export magazine The Ambassador that were designed to promote British culture and industry abroad.

== Later life and work ==
Goalen retired from modelling when she married Lloyd's underwriter Nigel Campbell in 1954, and the couple had two daughters. Such was her fame after her six-year modelling career that the wedding, at Caxton Hall, Westminster, was mobbed by onlookers. Subsequently known as Mrs Nigel Campbell, she organised the Berkeley dress show (a debutante event and fixture of the 'season') during the 1960s – despite her doubts about its relevance to the times. She also dispensed fashion advice in The Daily Telegraph and Daily Mirror designed children's clothes, modelled by her two young daughters.
