= Holland Villas Road =

Street in London, England

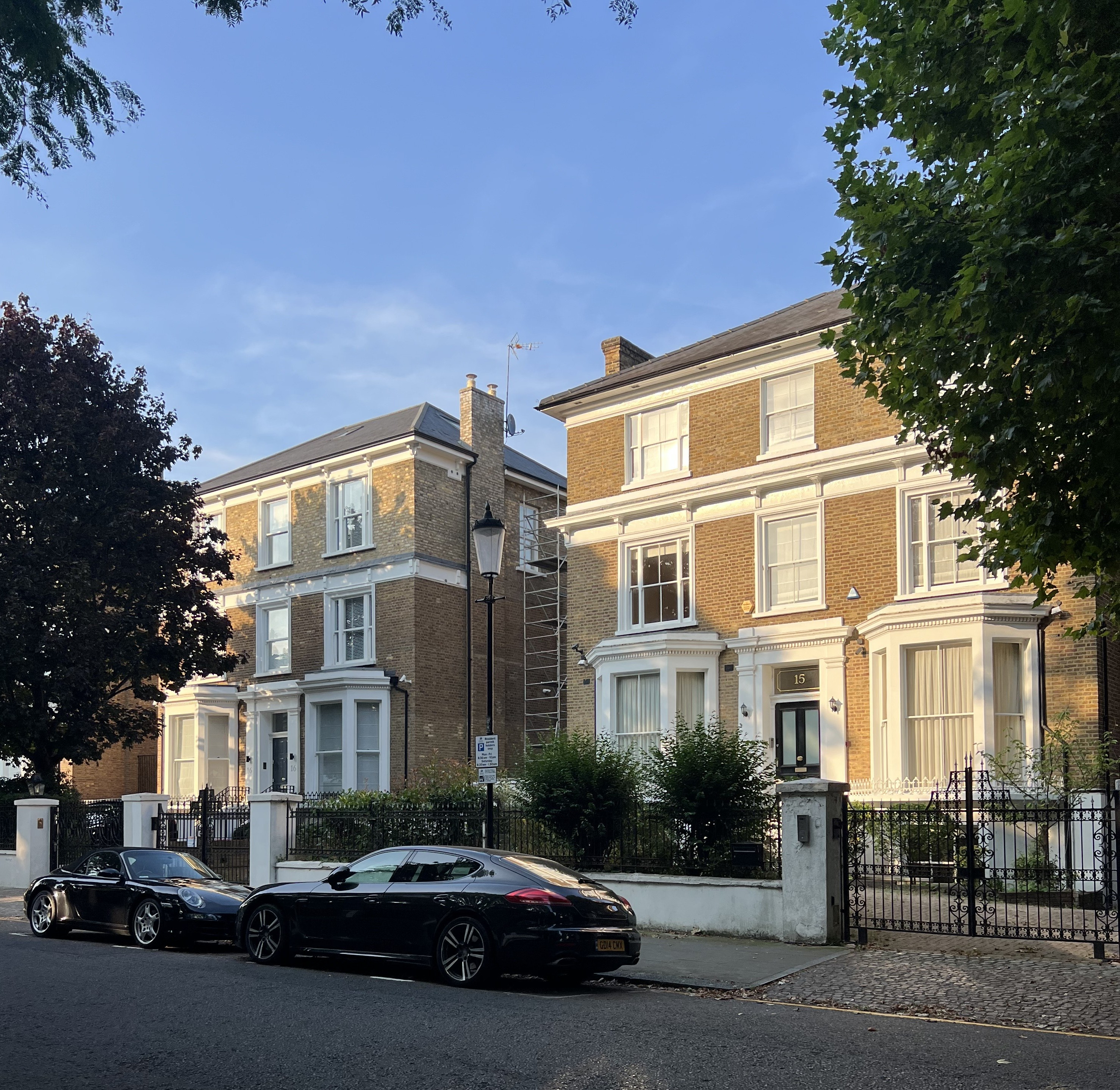
- 15 & 16 Holland Villas Road
- Interactive map of Holland Villas Road
- Location: Holland Park, Kensington, London, England
- Nearest metro station: Holland Park tube station
- Coordinates: 51.5012°N 0.2112°W
- From: Addison Road
- To: Addison Crescent

Holland Villas Road is a road in the Holland Park area of Kensington in London. The street regularly features among the most expensive residential streets in the United Kingdom.

From a junction with Addison Road and Upper Addison Gardens near Holland Park Avenue in the north, the road runs south to Addison Crescent.

== History ==
Designed in the 1850s by James Hall, houses on Holland Villas Road are some of the largest villas in central London. Identical in proportions to Hall's houses on neighbouring Addison Road, the properties feature 60-foot (18.3m) frontages, generous carriage drives and large gardens.

Most of the original houses built by James Hall remain intact. Of the 30 original villas, only No. 7 has been demolished.

== Notable residents ==
Holland Villas Road is home to various ambassadorial residences and has housed several notable figures.

- No. 4: Lindy Hamilton-Temple-Blackwood, Marchioness of Dufferin and Ava (née Guinness) and Sheridan Hamilton-Temple-Blackwood, 5th Marquess of Dufferin and Ava, both British patrons of the arts. Their parties at 4 Holland Villas Road were "legendary in the late 60s. You would find yourself talking to Princess Margaret or Duncan Grant and Angelica Garnett, or Francis Bacon or Stephen Spender or the Queen Mother."
- No. 6: Last residence of Jean Ingelow, English poet and novelist.
- No. 8: The first resident was art collector and patron Constantine Alexander Ionides, whose private collection was later bequeathed to the Victoria and Albert Museum. From at least 1939 to 1942, it was home to publisher and editor Hans Juda and his photographer wife Elsbeth Juda. Sir Geoffrey Eley, the High Sheriff of Greater London in 1966, later lived there.
- No. 19: Former residence of François-Henri Pinault and Salma Hayek.
