= The Ambassador (trade journal) =

British magazine for textiles and fashion

- Editor: Hans Juda
- Photographer: Elsbeth Juda
- Categories: Textiles
- Frequency: Monthly
- Publisher: Hans Juda
- Total circulation: 23,000
- Founder: László Moholy-Nagy and Ludwig Katz
- First issue: 1933
- Final issue: 1972
- Country: United Kingdom
- Based in: London, England
- Language: English, French, German, and Portuguese

The Ambassador, was a British trade journal for the textile industry. It was founded as International Textiles in Amsterdam, Netherlands in 1933. It published English and Dutch editions, but the Dutch version was taken over by the Germans during World War II. The English version became The Ambassador in 1946 and established a new focus on helping to re-establish an international market for British textiles. The publication was known for its artistic photography and innovative graphic design. The magazine ceased publication in 1972.

== History ==
In 1933, the trade journal International Textiles was founded in Amsterdam, The Netherlands, by Ludwig Katz and László Moholy-Nagy, both graduates of the Bauhaus School in Dessau, Germany who had fled Nazi Germany. International Textiles was published every two months. It covered the fashion and textiles industry and included advertisements, editorial comment, and illustrated news on all aspects of international fashion and textiles. Its text was published in Dutch, English, French, German, Portuguese, and Spanish.

International Textiles established a London satellite office under the direction of German desiger Hans Juda and his wife, photographer Elsbeth Juda. The Judas came to London as Jewish refugees from Nazi Germany. At the outbreak of World War II, communications were severed between the Dutch and English offices, with the advance agreement being that the London office would takeover the magazine if the Netherlands were invaded. The magazine closed in the Netherlands in May 1940 when Amsterdam came under German occupation. The Germans took over the magazine's Dutch office and resumed publishing the magazine in December 1940. However, the British office continued to publish its own version of the journal during the war, with support from the British government, which ensured the necessary supply of paper for printing.

After the war, there was a lawsuit regarding the dual use of the magazine's name. The Juda's changed the magazine's name to The Ambassador, The British Export Magazine in March 1946, shifting its focus to British textiles and related industries, trade, exports, and fashion. Juda was the magazine's publisher under the company Ambassador Publishing Co., Ltd. Juda created the magazine's motto, "Export of Die".

The Ambassador was a trade journal whose aim was to sell British textiles outside of the United Kingdom. It included features on developments in the textile trade and industry, listings of trade fairs and export opportunities, and updates on fashion, interior design with linens and carpets, and innovations such as new dyes, yarns, and finishes. Because its focus was on British textiles, the magazine only accepted advertisements from companies based in the United Kingdom.

The Ambassador was noted for its large size and "lavish modern aesthetic". Elsbeth Juda’s photography for the magazine combined elements of fashion, modernism, and trade, creating a distinctive visual look. The magazine included photoshoots with designers such as Charles Creed and Victor Stiebel and commissioned artists such as John Piper, Graham Sutherland, Frederick Henri Kay Henrion, and Henry Moore to design its covers. British art critic Robert Melville said The Ambassador was "the most daring and enterprising trade journal ever conceived...no other magazine...has so consistently and brilliantly demonstrated the relevance of works of art to the problems of industrial design."

The Ambassador was published monthly, primarily in English, with translations of its main articles in French, German, and Portuguese. In 1946, the magazine had offices in 45 countries. The magazine was only available by subscription to overseas subscribers, with a focus on buyers in the textile and fashion trades. Ultimately, it had a circulation of 23,000 in more than ninety countries. The Ambassador helped re-establish an international market for British textiles that was closed during World War II. Stanley Marcus, CEO of Neimann Marcus department store, said that the magazine, "more than any other publication from any other country supplied us with useful information and kindled our desire to get back to Europe to buy."

Thomson Publications bought The Ambassador in 1961. Hans Juda was a board member of Thomson Publications. Hans Juda retired as the magazine's editor in 1964. Elsbeth Judate continued to work as a photograph and associate editor of the magazine until 1965. The trade journal was published until 1972.

== Ambassador Awards ==
In keeping with Elsbeth and Hans Juda's interest in art, they established the Ambassador Awards to recognize contributions to export, art, and design. Recipeints of the Ambassador Awards included the Council for Industrial Design, Heal's, Osbert Lancaster, Denys Lasdun, Alex Moulton, John Piper, Sotheby's, and Graham Sutherland.

== Important contributors ==
One of the most important contributors was Max Hoff, whose early art was published in the magazine in 1934. Elsbeth Juda was a photographer and, later, an associate editor from 1940 to 1965. John Piper contributed regularly to the magazine, creating his first cover in 1942. Other contributors included Louis le Broquy and Graham Sutherland.
