= Christ in Glory in the Tetramorph =

Tapestry by Graham Sutherland at Coventry Cathedral

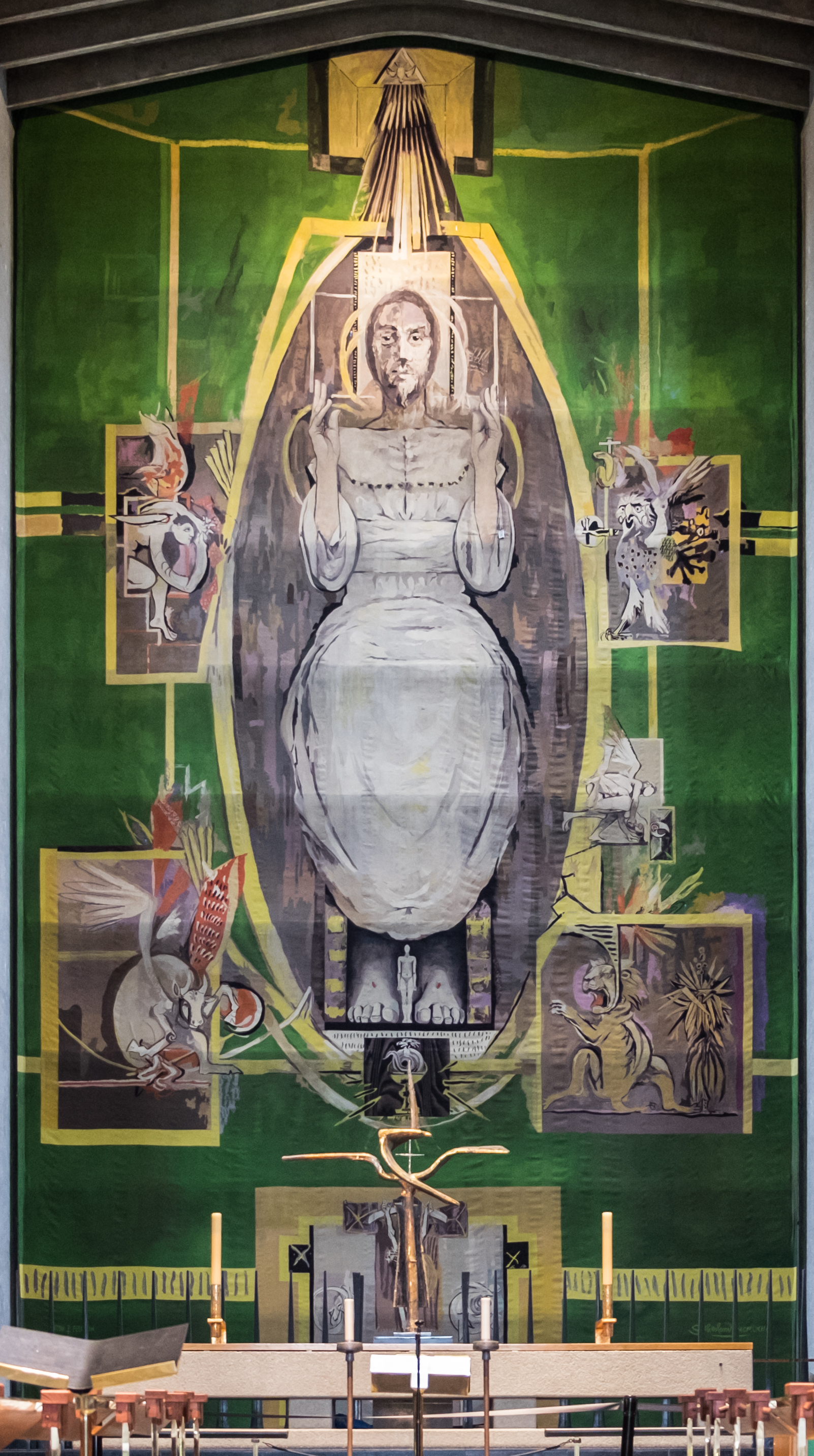
Graham Sutherland, Christ in Glory in the Tetramorph, 1962, in Coventry Cathedral.

Christ in Glory in the Tetramorph is a large tapestry by Graham Sutherland, installed at the north end of the new Coventry Cathedral in Coventry, England, as a focal point to the nave. It was unveiled in March 1962, shortly before the cathedral was consecrated in May 1962. The work measures 23 by 12 metres (75 ft × 39 ft), and is reputed to be the largest tapestry made in one single piece.

== Coventry Cathedral ==
The 14th century Gothic cathedral in Coventry was severely damaged in November 1940 by Luftwaffe bombs dropped during the Second World War. Rather than being repaired, the ruins were left as a memorial, and a new cathedral was built nearby. A competition to design the new building was launched in 1950 and won by Basil Spence with a modern style which included a tapestry behind the altar (sited at the north end of the cathedral, rather than the usual east end, as the new cathedral extended from the north transept of the old.).

== Design ==
Spence originally proposed a Crucifixion scene for the tapestry, and suggested Sutherland on the basis of his 1946 painting in St Matthew's Church, Northampton, influenced by Matthias Grünewald's Isenheim Altarpiece. Sutherland had been a war artist in the Second World War, and was a convert to Roman Catholicism. In the event, Sutherland's commission in 1951 was for a tapestry of Christ in Glory. Sutherland continued to work intermittently on the commission for the next 11 years.

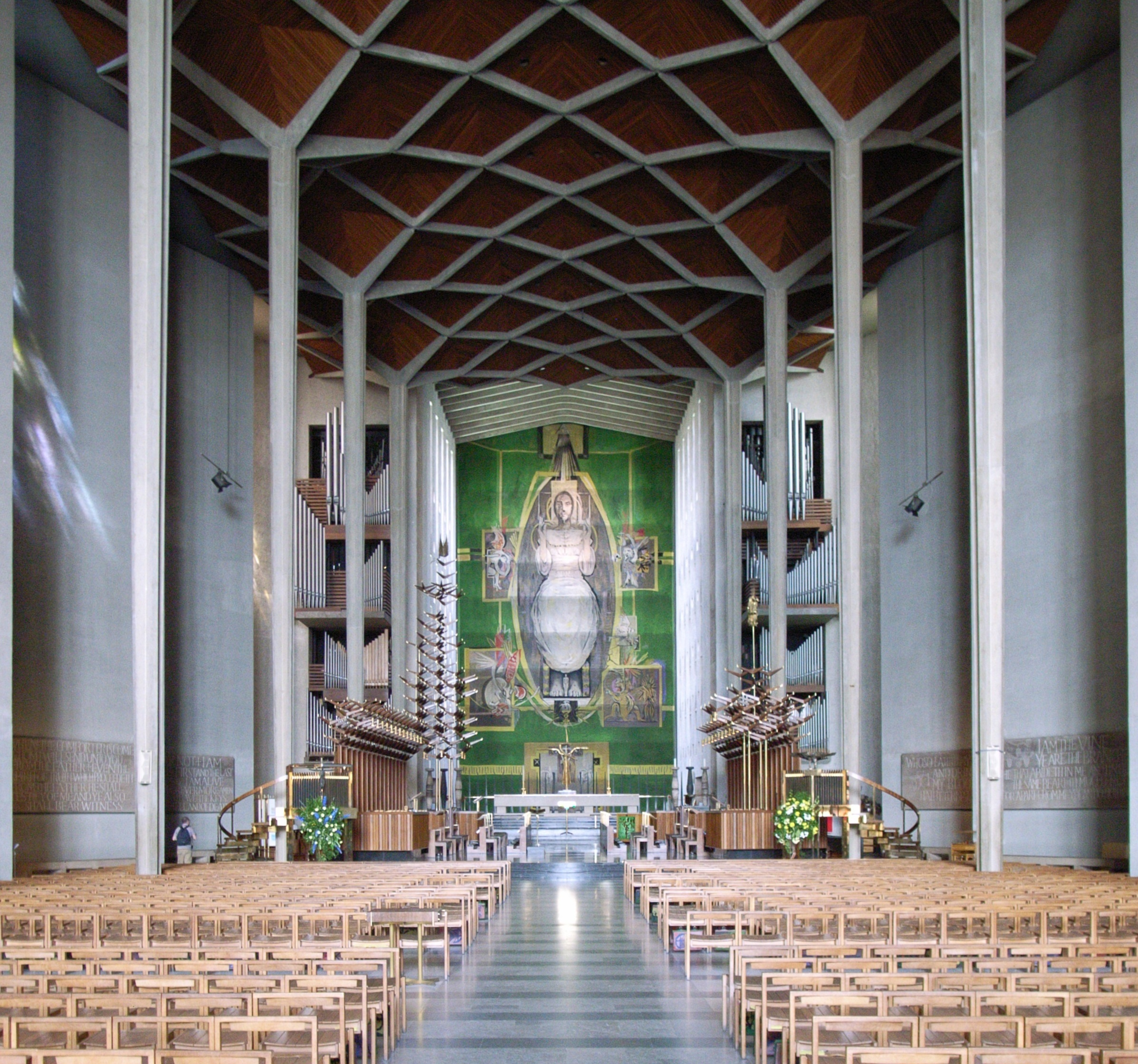
The tapestry installed behind the altar, at the north end of the nave in Coventry Cathedral

The tapestry depicts a seated Risen Christ, within an oval mandorla on a green background, surrounded by the four living creatures mentioned in Chapter 4 of the Book of Revelation, which are also symbols of the Four Evangelists. The tetramorph (four shapes) of the title are the lion for St Mark, eagle for St John, calf for St Luke, and angel for St Matthew.

For the four living creatures, Sutherland sketched eagles and lions at Maidstone Zoo. The composition also draws influences from Egyptian sculpture, Italian mosaic, and images of Christ Pantocrator in Greek and Romanesque churches.

The face of Christ is bearded, and is deliberately made more human than divine: it is based on several sources, including photographs of cyclists in Paris Match magazine. The Christ figure wears a white robe, and is sitting on a throne, face on, with both hands raised towards his face. Loops around the head suggest a halo.

Between his feet is a life-sized figure of a man, made diminutive by the colossal scale of the Christ-figure. At the base of the tapestry is a small Crucifixion scene.

Many of Sutherland's initial studies and sketches are held by the Herbert Art Gallery and Museum in Coventry, and the rest are in Basildon Park. Three preliminary cartoons, made in 1953, 1955 and 1957, are each 7 feet (2.1 m) high, approximately one-tenth the final size. The first has three panels at the base: an Annunciation, a Visitation, and a Pietà. The second has Christ with arms stretched out to either side, and no mandorla, and three different panels at the base: an Annunciation, the Madonna, and St Michael fighting the devil. The third cartoon resembles the final work, with Christ seated on a throne and hands raised to either side of his face. A fourth and final cartoon was photographically enlarged in sections to guide the work of the tapestry weavers.

At first Sutherland suggested that the tapestry could be woven by the Edinburgh Tapestry Company, but the work was eventually sent to Pinton Frères at Felletin near Aubusson in the Creuse department of France. The French weavers, unlike those in Edinburgh, were able to make the whole tapestry in one piece, with a weave count of 12 warps per inch, using a gigantic 500 year old loom.

It was made using undyed cotton warps and dyed wefts of wool from Australia. The pattern was built up using Aubusson tapestry techniques, using blocks of 900 different colours to create the different shades. A team of 12 worked on the tapestry for two years, under the supervision of Marie Cuttoli, and Sutherland visited nine times to check and correct the work.

== Legacy ==
The tapestry weighs over one tonne. According to the cathedral, it is the largest tapestry made in one single piece. However, the Guinness Book of Records lists a 2018 tapestry in Peru, at 288.5 square metres (3,105 sq ft), as the largest.

In 2015, it underwent surface cleaning and minor repairs.

Spence was knighted for his work on the new cathedral in 1960.
