= Elsbeth Juda =

British photographer

Elsbeth Ruth Juda
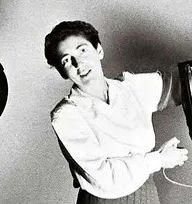
- Elsbeth Juda, 1942
- Born: Elsbeth Ruth Goldstein; 2 May 1911; Darmstadt, Germany
- Died: 5 July 2014 (aged 103)
- Known for: Photography
- Spouse: Hans Juda

Elsbeth Ruth Juda (née Goldstein) (2 May 1911 – 5 July 2014), known professionally as Jay, was a British photographer most notable for her pioneering fashion photography, and work as associate editor and photographer for The Ambassador magazine from 1940 to 1965.

== Early life ==
Juda was born in Darmstadt, Germany on 2 May 1911 to Margarete Neumann (1885–1954) and Julius Joel Goldstein (1873–1929), a philosopher. As a young woman, she moved to Paris, where she found work as secretary to a banker.

In 1931, Elsbeth married her childhood love, Hans Peter Juda (1904–1975), and they went to live in Berlin where he was a financial editor at the Berliner Tageblatt. In 1933, they fled Nazi Germany for London with nothing but two suitcases and a violin.

Juda studied photography under the Bauhaus photographer Lucia Moholy, the wife of the artist László Moholy-Nagy. At the time Juda and her husband Hans lived in London, where Hans was the publisher of a British trade magazine called The Ambassador, for which László Moholy-Nagy was the Art Director. Lucia Moholy would visit Juda at her home to teach her photography.

== Career ==
Soon after studying photography, Juda did a stint as a "dark room boy" at the Scaioni Studio in London. She later worked as a photographer for advertising companies and fashion magazines, including Harper's Bazaar .

=== The Ambassador ===
Hans and Elsbeth Juda originally opened a London satellite office for the Dutch trade magazine International Textiles. However, after 1940 when Amsterdam came under control of the Germany army, the magazine proved too difficult to continue. In March 1946, the couple changed the name of the publication to The Ambassador and also changed its focus to British industry, trade and exports. The Ambassador became the voice of British manufacturing for export when the nation's trade was struggling to emerge after 1945. It was published monthly in four languages (English, German, French and Portuguese), had subscribers in over ninety countries, and a circulation of 23,000 copies.

Hans Juda coined The Ambassador's official motto: "Export or Die". Later, as the magazine became an essential marketing and press journal for a Britain desperate to reestablish itself as a global exporter in the post-war era, the phrase would become a mantra for the national manufacturing industry. Throughout their work during the 1940s, 1950s and 1960s, Juda and her husband promoted every facet of British manufacturing, culture and the arts and, in the process, coming into close contact with a host of artists, writers, designers and photographers. The critic Robert Melville described Ambassador as "the most daring and enterprising trade journal ever conceived...no other magazine...has so consistently and brilliantly demonstrated the relevance of works of art to the problems of industrial design."

Juda's shoots for The Ambassador combined elements of fashion, modernism and trade. Her series of photos of the famed British model Barbara Goalen modelling Scottish textiles among the heavy machinery of working textile factory are especially representative of her unique visual aesthetics. Together they built a considerable art collection from the many artists that they came in contact with at The Ambassador. It is a much wider circle of friends, however, which would allow Jay to capture every facet of a reemerging post-war Britain through the lens of her camera. The magazine was bought by Thomson Publications in 1961 and continued to be published until 1972.

Juda used locations to provide unexpected theatrical backdrops to her work and partook in the new age of jet travel. She was sent to worldwide destinations on assignments for The Ambassador Magazine.

=== Painting and collage ===
Following the death of her husband in 1975, Juda returned to her early interest in painting, and in the late 1980s took a small studio on Fulham Road, London where she painted and evolved her work in collage. She produced several series of collage works based on her love of the paintings of Henri Matisse and around her fascination with the self-portraits of Rembrandt. An exhibition of her collage works, "Elsbeth Juda: 90 x Rembrandt" was held at England & Co gallery, London in 1994, with the catalogue featuring an introduction by Bryan Robertson.

=== Photography ===
Juda was a portraitist who photographed many British artists, models and other personalities of the 1950s and 60s. These included artists Henry Moore, John Piper, Joe Tilson, William Scott, Graham Sutherland, Kenneth Armitage, Lynn Chadwick, Osbert Lancaster, and Peter Blake. Models she photographed included Barbara Goalen, Fiona Campbell-Walter, Lisa Fonssagrives-Penn, Shelagh Wilson and Marla Scarafia. Further, famous personalities of the time she photographed included Margot Fonteyn, Richard Burton, Anthony Armstrong-Jones, and Peter Ustinov; and friends like Norman Parkinson, Mark Boxer, and Madge Garland were all affectionately portrayed.

Juda photographed and documented Graham Sutherland's portrait of Winston Churchill, which was commissioned in 1954 by the past and present members of the House of Lords and the House of Commons of the United Kingdom in celebration of Churchill's eightieth birthday. Sutherland's resulting controversial portrait became infamous because Churchill openly hated it and stated that it "makes me look half-witted." After it was publicly unveiled in Westminster Hall on 30 November 1954, Sutherland's portrait was hidden and then destroyed (by order of Lady Churchill). Juda's photographs record the day when an elderly Churchill can be seen being posed by Sutherland. Churchill was unwell at the time; he drank heavily at lunchtimes, and in the previous year he had suffered a stroke and, although he had recovered, the effects of age and illness were increasingly apparent. According to Juda, during the session Graham Sutherland would say, 'A little more of the old lion, sir' and he'd sit up and then flop after a minute.

In 1980, Juda presented the National Portrait Gallery a collection of bromide prints, negatives, contact sheets, and news cuttings relating to her photographs of Winston Churchill and Graham Sutherland.

In 2009, the gallery L’Equipement des Arts held an exhibition of Elsbeth Juda's Photographs from 1940 to 1965, the first major exhibition of her photographic work. This followed an extensive research project on The Ambassador Archive at the V&A Museum which led to negatives being loaned by the V&A and by the National Portrait Gallery to produce prints of 140 historic images by Juda, many of which had never been seen or exhibited before. These included a unique record of Graham Sutherland's ill-fated portrait of Winston Churchill commissioned by the House of Commons to celebrate his 80th birthday. The exhibition also showed, for the first time, a series of photographs which illustrate Juda's unprecedented access to Henry Moore and his studio as he worked on the sculpture King and Queen. The exhibition also featured dramatic photographs of a model draped in only fabric and photographed on the roof of Lancashire mill to promote the British textile industry.

=== British Fortnights ===
Juda started themed months called British Fortnights at the American department stores Lord and Taylor and Neiman Marcus in an effort to promote British brands and goods. Juda was initially approached to create a British Fortnight at Neiman Marcus in Dallas, Texas by Stanley Marcus, who was a fan of The Ambassador. Stanley Marcus and Juda eventually become close friends, with Marcus even setting up a trip for Juda to visit the Kodak company in Rochester, New York and the studios of Richard Avedon and Irving Penn.

== Legacy ==
In 1987 Juda donated The Ambassador archives to the Victoria and Albert Museum. The most complete sets of Juda's archives can be found in the British Library and the Victoria and Albert Museum.

== Notes and references ==
- Lipman, Maureen. "My best friends are old – but only in body.", The Guardian, 2006-03-31. Retrieved 2009-06-29.
- Lederman, Erika. "Photographer Juda Captures Supermodel on Skis, Aging Churchill.", Bloomberg L.P., 2009-05-03. Retrieved 2009-06-29.
- Fallyrag, the Arts and Culture Journal. "Milling Around Lancashire.", Fallyrag, 2009-04-24. Retrieved 2009-06-29.
- Ibell, Paul. "Perspectives.", New Statesman, 2006-05-21. Retrieved 2009-06-29.
- Mohammed, Michael and Anscombe, Isabelle. "Elsbeth Juda JAY Photographs 1940 -1965.", 'L'Equipement des Arts Exhibition and Catalog' Retrieved on 2009-06-29.
