= Chartwell =

Country house in Kent, England

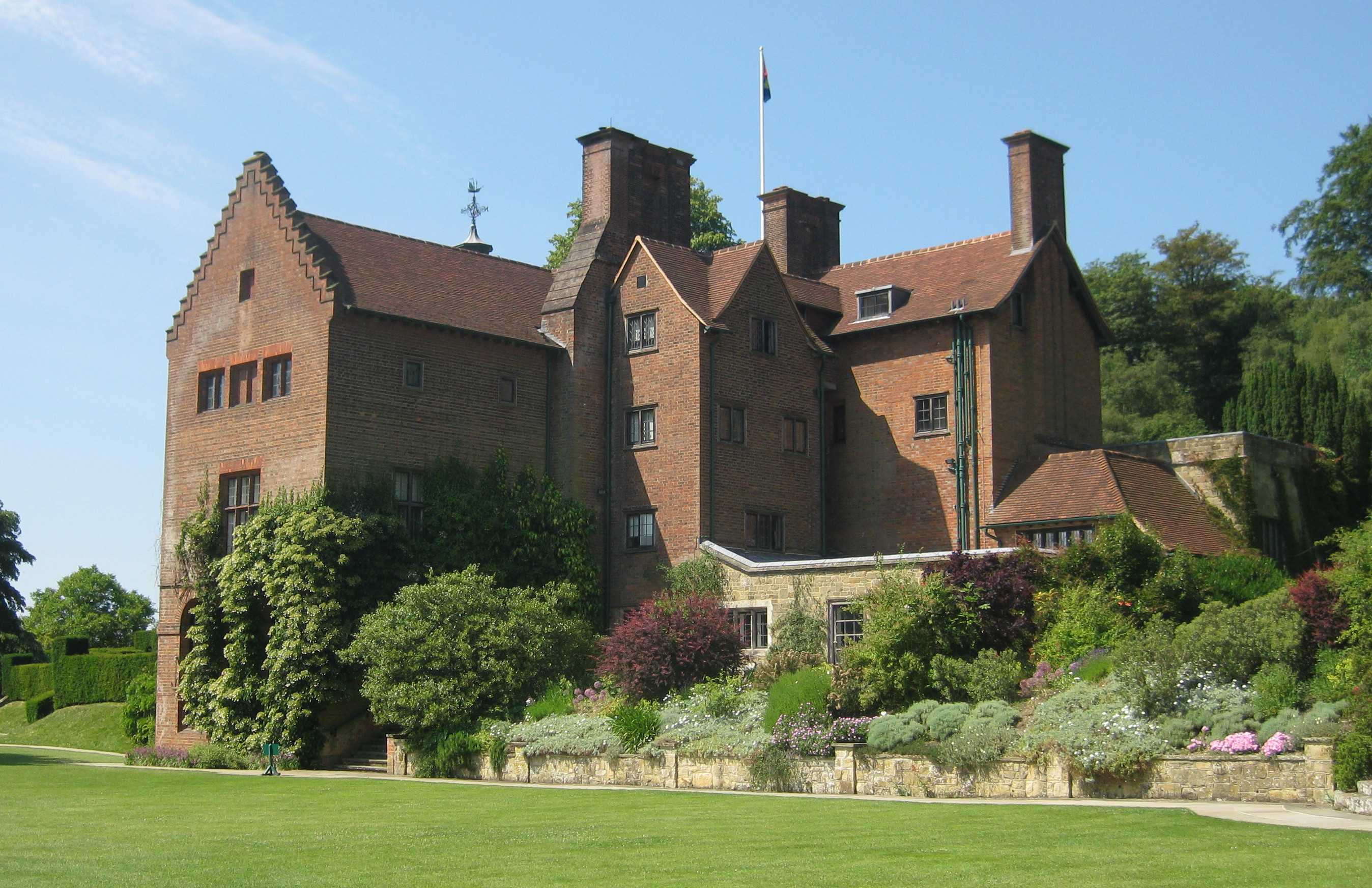
- View of Chartwell from the north-east

- Location within Kent
- 51.2443°N 0.0833°E
- Type: Country house
- Location: Westerham, Kent, England

History
- Built: Early modern period
- Rebuilt: 1922–24

Site notes
- Architect: Philip Tilden (1920s)
- Architectural style: Vernacular
- Owner: National Trust

Listed Building – Grade I
- Official name: Chartwell
- Designated: 16 January 1975
- Reference no.: 1272626

National Register of Historic Parks and Gardens
- Official name: Chartwell Garden
- Designated: 1 May 1986
- Reference no.: 1000263

Chartwell is a country house near Westerham, Kent, in South East England. For over forty years, it was the home of Sir Winston Churchill. He bought the property in September 1922 and lived there until shortly before his death in January 1965.

During the 1930s, when Churchill was out of political office, Chartwell became the centre of his world. At his dining table, he gathered those who could assist his campaign against German re-armament and the British government's response of appeasement; in his study, he composed speeches and wrote books; in his garden, he built walls, constructed lakes — both with his own hands — and painted.

During the Second World War, Chartwell was largely unused, the Churchills returning after he lost the 1945 election. In 1953, when again prime minister, the house became Churchill's refuge when he suffered a debilitating stroke. In October 1964, he left for the last time, dying at his London home, 28 Hyde Park Gate, on 24 January 1965.

The origins of the estate reach back to the 14th century; in 1382, the property (then called Well-street) was owned by William-at-Well. It passed through various owners and was auctioned in 1836, as a substantial brick-built manor. In 1848, it was purchased by John Campbell Colquhoun, whose grandson sold it to Churchill. The Campbell Colquhouns greatly enlarged the house and the advertisement for its sale at the time of Churchill's purchase described it as an imposing mansion. Between 1922 and 1924, it was rebuilt and extended by the society architect Philip Tilden. From the garden front, the house has extensive views over the Weald of Kent, "the most beautiful and charming" Churchill had ever seen, and the determining factor in his decision to buy the house.

In 1946, when financial constraints forced Churchill to consider selling Chartwell, it was acquired by the National Trust with funds raised by a consortium of Churchill's friends (led by Lord Camrose), on condition that the Churchills retained a life-tenancy. After Churchill's death, Lady Churchill surrendered her rights to the house, and it was opened to the public by the Trust in 1966 as a historic house museum. A Grade I listed building, for its historical significance rather than its architectural merit, Chartwell has become among the Trust's most popular properties; 232,000 people visited the house in 2016, the fiftieth anniversary of its opening.

== History ==
=== Early history to 1922 ===
The earliest recorded mention of the land dates to 1362, when it was sold by a William At-Well. The origin of the name is the Chart Well, a spring to the north of the current house, Chart being an Old English word for rough ground. The site had been built upon at least as early as the 16th century, when the estate was called Well Street. Henry VIII was reputed to have stayed in the house during his courtship of Anne Boleyn at nearby Hever Castle. Elements of the Tudor house are still visible; the Historic England listing for Chartwell notes that 16th-century (or possibly 17th-century) brickwork can be seen in some of the external walls. During the 17th and 18th centuries, the house was used as a farmhouse, and its ownership was subject to frequent change.

On 22 September 1836, the property was auctioned at Cheapside, advertised as "a suitable abode for a genteel family". In 1848, it was purchased by John Campbell Colquhoun, a former MP; the Campbell Colquhouns were a family of Scottish landowners, lawyers and politicians. The original farmhouse was enlarged and modified during their ownership, including the addition of the stepped gables, a Scottish baronial genuflection to the land of their ancestors. By the time of the sale to Churchill, it was, in the words of Oliver Garnett, author of the 2008 guidebook to the house, an example of "Victorian architecture at its least attractive, a ponderous red-brick country mansion of tile-hung gables and poky oriel windows". Tilden, in his "highly unreliable" memoirs, True Remembrances, wrote of "creating Chartwell out of the drabness of Victorian umbrageousness".

=== Churchill at Chartwell ===
==== 1922 to 1939 ====
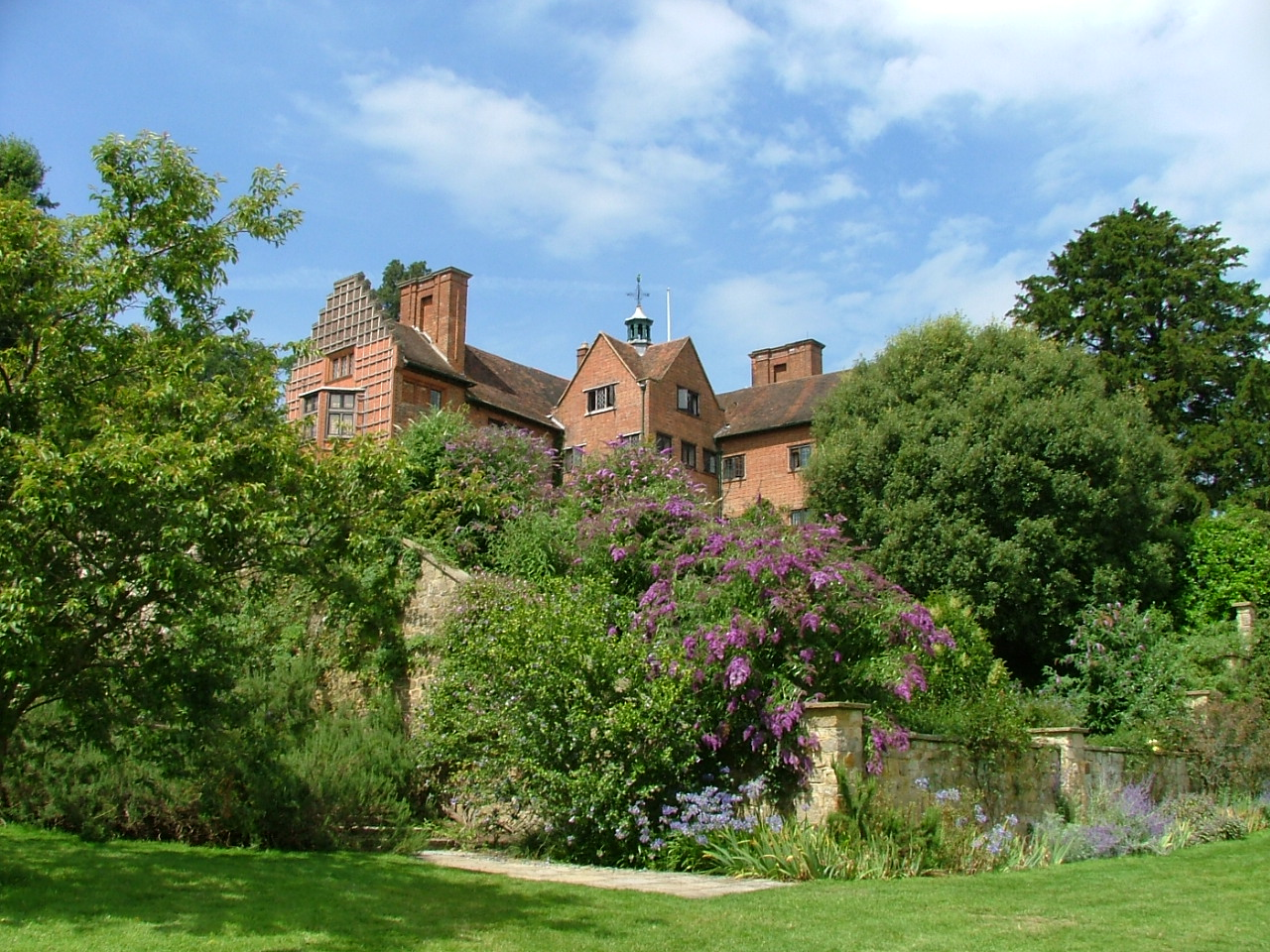
Chartwell – Clementine Churchill's "magnificent aerial bower" to the left

Churchill first saw Chartwell in July 1921, shortly before the house and estate were to be auctioned. He returned the same month with his wife Clementine, who was initially attracted to the property, although her enthusiasm cooled during subsequent visits. In September 1922, when the house had failed to sell at auction, he was offered it for £5,500. He paid £5,000, after his first offer of £4,800, made because "the house will have to be very largely rebuilt, and the presence of dry rot is a very serious adverse factor", was rejected. The seller was Captain Archibald John Campbell Colquhoun, who had inherited the house in June 1922 on the death of his brother. Campbell Colquhoun had been a contemporary of Churchill's at Harrow School in the 1880s. On completion of the sale in September 1922, Churchill wrote to him, "I am very glad indeed to have become the possessor of "Chartwell". I have been searching for two years for a home in the country and the site is the most beautiful and charming I have ever seen". The sale was concluded on 11 November 1922.

The previous 15 months had been personally and professionally calamitous. In June 1921, Churchill's mother had died, followed three months later by his youngest child, Marigold. In late 1922, he fell ill with appendicitis and at the end of the year lost his Scottish parliamentary seat at Dundee.

Philip Tilden, Churchill's architect, began work on the house in 1922 and the Churchills rented a farmhouse near Westerham, with Churchill frequently visiting the site to observe progress. The two-year building programme, the ever-rising costs – which escalated from the initial estimate of £7,000 to over £18,000 – and a series of construction difficulties (particularly relating to damp) soured relations between architect and client; by 1924, Churchill and Tilden were barely on speaking terms. (Note: Tilden's relations with Clementine were no warmer; in 1923, after they had fallen out over the installation of a kitchen range, Clementine suggested Tilden might move to Tokyo to assist in its reconstruction after an earthquake.) (Note: Tilden’s undoubted skills did not prevent him making practical mistakes, and falling out with many of his clients. Thomas Jones, visiting Bron-y-de, the Surrey country house Tilden designed for David Lloyd George in 1926, noted; “Tilden forgot to put a scullery at Churt: what he forgot at Chartwell I did not discover because he was a subject to be avoided.”) Legal arguments, conducted through their respective lawyers, continued until 1927. Clementine's anxieties about the costs, both of building and subsequently living at Chartwell, also continued. In September 1923, Churchill wrote to her, "My beloved, I beg you not to worry about money, or to feel insecure. Chartwell is to be our home (and) we must endeavour to live there for many years." Churchill finally moved into the house in April 1924; a letter dated 17 April to Clementine begins, "This is the first letter I have ever written from this place, and it is right that it should be to you".

In February 1926, Churchill's political colleague Sir Samuel Hoare described a visit in a letter to the press baron Lord Beaverbrook; "I have never seen Winston before in the role of landed proprietor, ... the engineering works on which he is engaged consist of making a series of ponds in a valley and Winston appeared to be a great deal more interested in them than in anything else in the world". As Hoare's presence indicated, Churchill's holidays were very rarely pure vacations. Roy Jenkins, in his study, The Chancellors, contrasted Churchill's approach to holidaying with that of his then boss, Stanley Baldwin. "Churchill went to Chartwell or elsewhere to lengthen the stride of his political work, but not greatly to reduce its quantity; far from shutting himself off, he persuaded as many as possible of his colleagues and henchmen to visit him, to receive his ever-generous hospitality." In January 1928, James Lees-Milne stayed as a guest of Churchill's son Randolph. He described an evening after dinner; "We remained at that round table till after midnight. Mr Churchill spent a blissful two hours demonstrating with decanters and wine glasses how the Battle of Jutland was fought. He got worked up like a schoolboy, making barking noises in imitation of gunfire, and blowing cigar smoke across the battle scene in imitation of gun smoke". On 26 September 1927, Churchill composed the first of his Chartwell Bulletins, which were lengthy letters to Clementine, written to her while she was abroad. In the bulletins, Churchill described in great detail the ongoing works on the house and the gardens, and aspects of his life there. The 26 September letter opens with a report of Churchill's deepening interest in painting; "Sickert arrived on Friday night and we worked very hard at various paintings ... I am really thrilled ... I see my way to paint far better pictures than I ever thought possible before".

Churchill described his life at Chartwell during the later 1930s in the first volume of his history of the Second World War, The Gathering Storm. "I had much to amuse me. I built ... two cottages, ... and walls and made ... a large swimming pool which ... could be heated to supplement our fickle sunshine. Thus I ... dwelt at peace within my habitation". Bill Deakin, one of Churchill's research assistants, recalled his working routine. "He would start the day at eight o'clock in bed, reading. Then he started with his mail. His lunchtime conversation was quite magnificent, ...absolutely free for all. After lunch, if he had guests he would take them round the garden. At seven he would bathe and change for dinner. At midnight, when the guests left, then he would start work ... to three or four in the morning. The secret was his phenomenal power to concentrate." (Note: A contributory factor was Churchill's habit of taking to his bed after lunch, an opportunity not accorded to his subordinates. Alan Don, secretary to Cosmo Gordon Lang, the Archbishop of Canterbury, recorded in his diary a meeting between the archbishop and the prime minister on 1 August 1940; "[Lang] saw W.C. at 5 p.m. - the latter had just got out of bed and was as usual smoking a large cigar. He gets up as fresh as paint and works at full steam until the early hours of the morning. His habit of going to bed between lunch and tea is rather disconcerting to his colleagues.") In his study of Churchill as author, the historian Peter Clarke described Chartwell as "Winston's word factory". (Note: Clarke records Churchills's approach to writing; "(at night) the day's literary work would really begin...materials for the current chapter would be laid out on a long, raised table. Either Violet Pearman or Grace Hamblin would be on hand for dictation. 'Well, we must have done three thousand words', he would say, normally at about 2 a.m. and the duty secretary could be sent home. An hour or two later, the great wordsmith would also retire.")

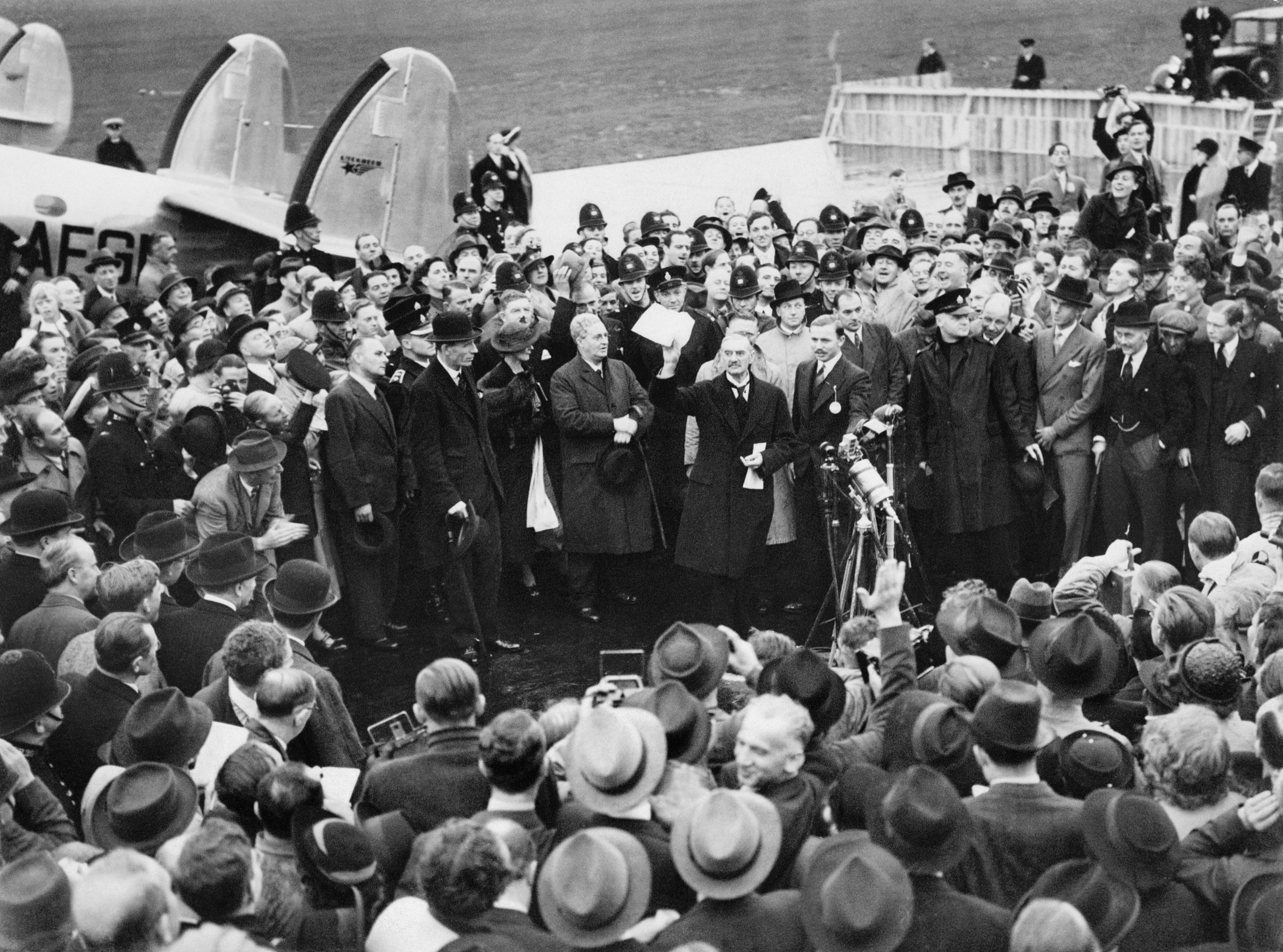
Chartwell was the base from which Churchill waged his campaign against Neville Chamberlain's policy of appeasement

In the opinion of Robin Fedden, a diplomat, and later Deputy General Secretary of the National Trust and author of the Trust's first guidebook for Chartwell, the house became "the most important country house in Europe". The historian Graham Stewart, in his study of Tory Party politics, Burying Caesar, described it as "a sort of Jacobite court of St Germain". (Note: James II had been granted the Château de Saint-Germain-en-Laye after his flight from England in 1688, and it remained a gathering place for supporters of the restoration of the Stuart monarchy.) A stream of friends, colleagues, disgruntled civil servants, concerned military officers and foreign envoys came to the house to provide information to support Churchill's struggle against appeasement. (Note: Chartwell had always provided Churchill with a venue for political discussion. Earlier in the 1930s, Churchill conducted much of the planning for the work of the India Defence League at the house. Graham Stewart notes the "regularity in which Chartwell was used as the meeting forum" for opponents of the National Government's Government of India Bill.) At Chartwell, he developed what Fedden calls, his own "little Foreign Office ... the hub of resistance". The Chartwell visitors' book, meticulously maintained from 1922, records 780 house guests, not all of them friends, but all grist to Churchill's mill. An example of the latter was Sir Maurice Hankey, Clerk of the Privy Council, who was Churchill's guest for dinner in April 1936. Hankey subsequently wrote, "I do not usually make a note of private conversations but some points arose which gave an indication of the line which Mr Churchill is likely to take in forthcoming debates (on munitions and supply) in Parliament". A week later, Reginald Leeper, a senior Foreign Office official and confidant of Robert Vansittart, visited Churchill to convey their views on the need to use the League of Nations to counter German aggression. Vansittart wrote, "there is no time to lose. There is indeed a great danger that we shall be too late".

Churchill also recorded visits to Chartwell by two more of his most important suppliers of confidential governmental information, Desmond Morton and Ralph Wigram, information which he used to "form and fortify my opinion about the Hitler Movement". (Note: Churchill recorded Morton and Wigram's contributions in The Gathering Storm, the first volume of his history of the Second World War. "I formed a great regard for (Morton). He was a neighbour of mine, dwelling only a mile away from Chartwell, and became one of my most intimate advisers till our final victory was won. Wigram saw as clearly as I did, but with more certain information, the awful peril which was closing in upon us.") Their sharing of data on German rearmament was at some risk to their careers; the military historian Richard Holmes is clear that Morton's actions breached the Official Secrets Act. Chartwell was also the scene of more direct attempts to prepare Britain for the coming conflict; in October 1939, when reappointed First Lord of the Admiralty on the outbreak of war, Churchill suggested an improvement for anti-aircraft shells; "Such shells could be filled with zinc ethyl which catches fire spontaneously ... A fraction of an ounce was demonstrated at Chartwell last summer". (Note: In addition to those made by Morton and Wigram, the historian Andrew Roberts records visits to Chartwell by Vansittart himself, Heinrich Brüning, the anti-Nazi former German chancellor, and the socialist French politicians Léon Blum and Pierre Cot. The information he obtained from these and other sources made Churchill the best "informed politician in Britain about the capacities and limitations of both Britain's armed forces and Germany's".)

In 1938, Churchill, beset by financial concerns, again considered selling Chartwell, at which time the house was advertised as containing five reception rooms, nineteen bed and dressing rooms, eight bathrooms, set in eighty acres with three cottages on the estate and a heated and floodlit swimming pool. (Note: In his study of Churchill and his son Randolph, Churchill & Son, Josh Ireland records the running costs of Chartwell in the mid-1930s as being £10,000 per year.) He withdrew the sale after the industrialist Henry Strakosch agreed to take over his share portfolio, which had been hit heavily by losses on Wall Street, for three years and pay off significant associated debts. In September 1938, the Russian Ambassador, Ivan Maisky, made his first visit and recorded his impressions of Chartwell: "A wonderful place! A two-storey house, large and tastefully presented; the terrace affords a breathtaking view of Kent's hilly landscape; ponds with goldfish of varying size; a pavilion-cum-studio with dozens of paintings - his own creations - hanging on the walls; his pride and joy, a small brick cottage which he was building with his own hands". (Note: Sensing Maisky's discomfort at the opulence of his estate, Churchill sought to put him at his ease; "You can observe all this with an untroubled soul! My estate is not a product of man's exploitation by man: it was bought entirely on my literary royalties". Maisky noted in his diary, "[his] royalties must be pretty decent!") His impression of his host was somewhat less favourable; asked what special occasion would lead Churchill to drink a bottle of wine dating from 1793 from his cellar, Churchill had replied - "We'll drink this together when Great Britain and Russia beat Hitler's Germany". Maisky's unspoken reaction was recorded in his diary, "Churchill's hatred of Berlin really has gone beyond all limits!"

==== 1939 to 1965 ====
Chartwell was mostly unused during the Second World War. (Note: Churchill's own History describes only two visits during the war. The first, in April 1942, saw Churchill inspect a Young Soldiers battalion detailed to Chartwell for his personal protection, and write to the Secretary of State for War and the Chief of the Imperial General Staff demanding to know why the battalion reported as being short of Bren guns and carriers. The second, in 1943, was interrupted by the unexpected arrival of Ivan Maisky, who drove down from London to deny charges made by the Polish government-in-exile of Russian responsibility for the Katyn massacre.) (Note: John Martin, appointed Churchill's Principal Private Secretary in May 1941, also recorded the second of these visits in his diary, "April 16, 1943: ...at Pelham Place. Picnic lunch in the garden. To Chartwell with PM. Thence to Chequers". This is the only mention of Chartwell in the diary which begins on 21 May 1940, on Martin’s becoming one of Churchill’s Private Secretaries and concludes on 30 June 1945 with the following entry, “Although it was not easy to work for Churchill, it was tremendous fun”.) Its exposed position in a county so near to German-occupied France meant it was vulnerable to a German airstrike or commando raid. (Note: Commander Tommy Thompson, Churchill's aide-de-camp from 1939-1945, recorded that the house's siting on the Wealden Ridge, and the proximity of the series of lakes, meant that it could easily be identified by aerial reconnaissance.) As a precaution the lakes were covered with brushwood to make the house less identifiable from the air. A rare visit to Chartwell occurred in July 1940, when Churchill inspected aircraft batteries in Kent. His Principal Private Secretary at the time, Eric Seal, recorded the visit; "In the evening the PM, Mrs C and I went off to Chartwell. One of the features of the place is a whole series of ponds, which are stocked with immense goldfish. The PM loves feeding them". (Note: Recording a post-war visit, the historian A. L. Rowse described the goldfish; "I have never seen such fat, spoiled fishes: they were addressed as 'darlings'—as Rufus the poodle had been—and came to the rattle of his cane".) The Churchills instead spent their weekends at Ditchley House, in Oxfordshire, until security improvements were completed at the Prime Minister's official country residence, Chequers, in Buckinghamshire. At dinner at Chequers, in December 1940, John Colville, Churchill's assistant private secretary recorded his master's post-war plans, "He would retire to Chartwell and write a book on the war, which he had already mapped out in his mind chapter by chapter".

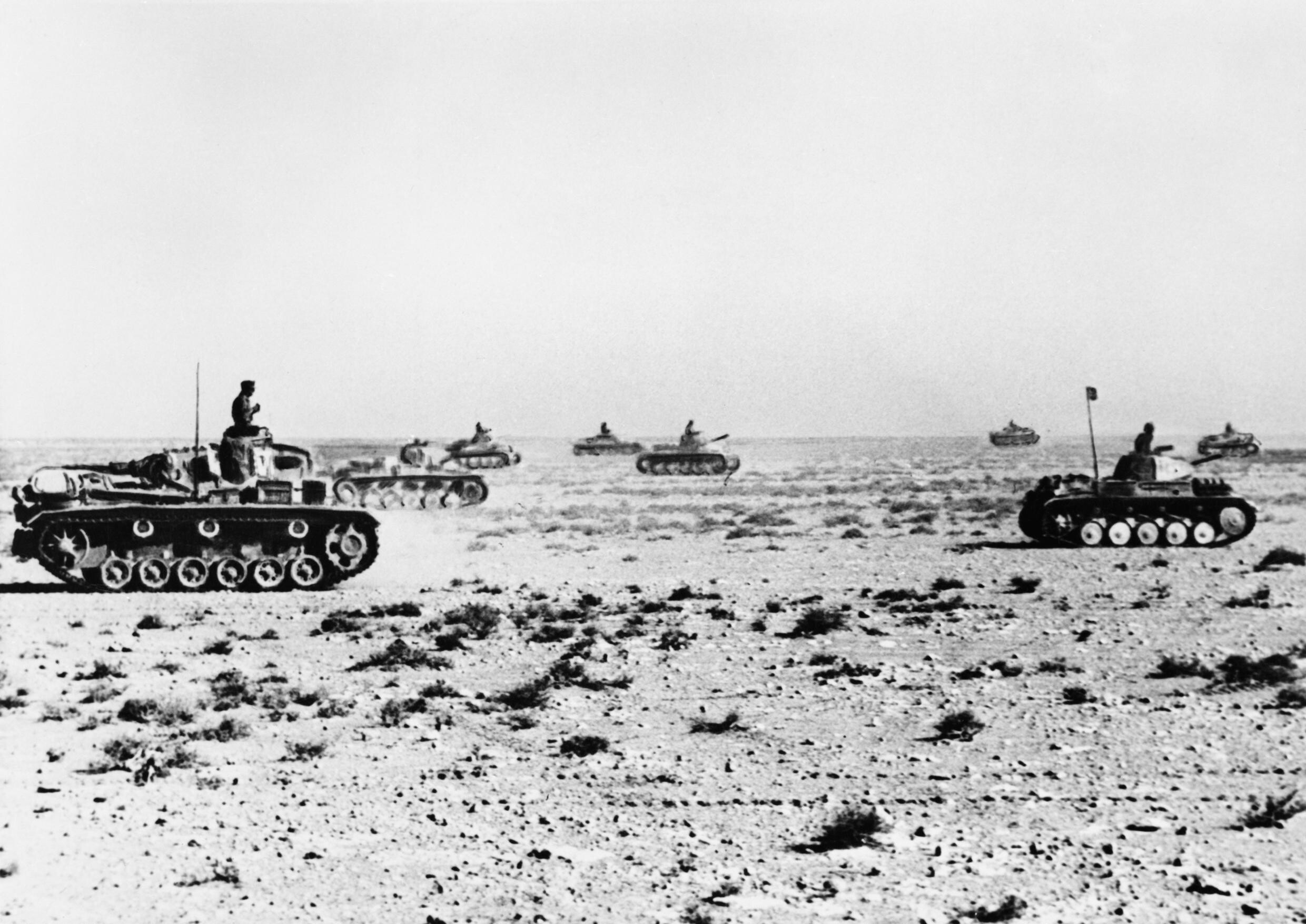
German Panzers at Tobruk, June 1941. Closed up during the war, Chartwell remained Churchill's bolthole at times of crisis

Chartwell remained a haven in times of acute stress—Churchill spent the night there before the fall of France in 1940. Summoned to London by an urgent plea from Lord Gort for permission to retreat to Dunkirk, Churchill broadcast the first of his wartime speeches to the nation; "Arm yourselves, and be ye men of valour...for it is better for us to perish in battle than to look upon the outrage of our nation..." He returned again on 20 June 1941, after the failure of Operation Battleaxe to relieve Tobruk, and determined to sack the Middle East commander, General Wavell. John Colville recorded Churchill's deliberations in his diary; "spent the afternoon at Chartwell. After a long sleep the P.M. in a purple dressing gown and grey felt hat took me to see his goldfish. He was ruminating deeply about the fate of Tobruk and contemplating means of resuming the offensive". Churchill continued to pay occasional, short, visits to the house; on one such, on 24 June 1944, just after the Normandy landings, his secretary recorded that the house was "shut up and rather desolate".

Following VE Day, the Churchills first returned to Chartwell on 18 May 1945, to be greeted by what the horticulturalist and garden historian Stefan Buczacki describes as, "the biggest crowd Westerham had ever seen". But military victory was rapidly followed by political defeat as Churchill lost the July 1945 general election. He almost immediately went abroad, while Clementine went back to Chartwell to begin the long process of opening up the house for his return—"it will be lovely when the lake camouflage is gone". Later that year, Churchill again gave thought to selling Chartwell, concerned by the expense of running the estate. A group of friends, organised by Lord Camrose, raised the sum of £55,000 which was passed to the National Trust allowing it to buy the house from Churchill for £43,800. The excess provided an endowment. (Note: Details of the sale of the house were not made public and sources provide somewhat differing views as to the sums involved. Josh Ireland suggests that the Camrose consortium paid £85,000 for the estate, with £35,000 going to the National Trust as an endowment, and the remaining £50,000 going to Churchill.) The sale was completed on 29 November. For payment of a rent of £350 per annum, plus rates, the Churchills committed to a 50-year lease, allowing them to live at Chartwell until their deaths, at which point the property would revert to the National Trust. Churchill recorded his gratitude in a letter to Camrose in December 1945, "I feel how inadequate my thanks have been, my dear Bill, who (...) never wavered in your friendship during all these long and tumultuous years".

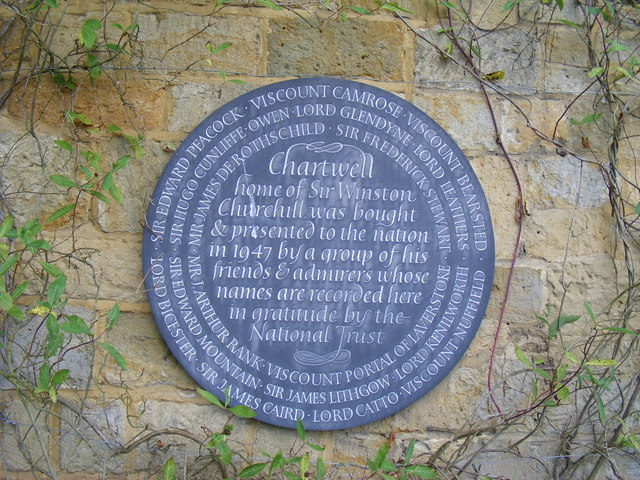
Plaque at Chartwell recording the names of those who raised the funds for the purchase of the house by the National Trust in 1945

In 1953, Chartwell became Churchill's refuge once more when, again in office as prime minister, he suffered a debilitating stroke. (Note: When Churchill was returned to the premiership in 1951, Chartwell was again closed up as the effort of running 10 Downing Street, the prime minister's official country house Chequers, and Chartwell was too great for Lady Churchill. Anthony Montague Browne, Churchill's last Private Secretary, recalled a discussion at Downing Street in the early 1950s: "WSC – 'I shall go to Chartwell next weekend'. CSC – 'Winston, you can't! It's closed and there will be no one there to cook for you.' WSC – 'I shall cook for myself. I can boil an egg. I've seen it done.'") At the end of a dinner held on 23 June at 10 Downing Street, for the Italian Prime Minister Alcide De Gasperi, Churchill collapsed and was barely able either to stand or to speak. On the 25th, he was driven to Chartwell, where his condition deteriorated further. Churchill's doctor Lord Moran stated that "he did not think the Prime Minister could possibly live over the weekend". That evening Colville summoned Churchill's closest friends in the press, Lord Beaverbrook, Lord Camrose and Brendan Bracken who, walking the lawns at Chartwell, agreed to try to ensure a press blackout to prevent any reporting of Churchill's condition. Colville described the outcome, "They achieved the all but incredible success of gagging Fleet Street, something they would have done for nobody but Churchill. Not a word of the Prime Minister's stroke was published until he casually mentioned it in the House of Commons a year later". Secluded and protected at Chartwell, Churchill made a remarkable recovery and thoughts of his retirement quickly receded. During his recuperation, Churchill took the opportunity to complete work on Triumph and Tragedy, the sixth and final volume of his war memoirs, which he had been forced to set aside when he returned to Downing Street in 1951.

On 5 April 1955, Churchill chaired his last cabinet, almost fifty years since he had first sat in the Cabinet Room as President of the Board of Trade in 1908. The following day he held a tea party for staff at Downing Street before driving to Chartwell. On being asked by a journalist on arrival how it felt no longer to be prime minister, Churchill replied, "It's always nice to be home". For the next ten years, Churchill spent much time at Chartwell, although both he and Lady Churchill also travelled extensively. (Note: Churchill was a lifelong opponent of physical exercise, Jock Colville recording his comment on it, made during his master's last years at Chartwell: "I get my exercise as a pallbearer to my many friends who exercised all their lives".) His days there were spent writing, painting, playing bezique or sitting "by the fish pond, feeding the golden orfe and meditating". Of his last years at the house, Churchill's daughter, Mary Soames, recalled, "in the two summers that were left to him he would lie in his 'wheelbarrow' chair contemplating the view of the valley he had loved for so long".

Catherine Snelling served Churchill as one his last secretaries. In the oral histories of a number of such secretaries compiled by the Churchill Archive, she recalled the dwindling number of visitors Churchill received at the house in his later years. They included Clementine's cousin, Sylvia Henley, Violet Bonham Carter, daughter of H. H. Asquith and a lifelong friend, Harold Macmillan and Bernard Montgomery. On 13 October 1964, Churchill's last dinner guests at Chartwell were his former principal private secretary Sir Leslie Rowan and his wife. Lady Rowan later recalled, "It was sad to see such a great man become so frail". The following week, increasingly incapacitated, Churchill left the house for the last time. His official biographer Martin Gilbert records Churchill was, "never to see his beloved Chartwell again". After his death in January 1965, Lady Churchill relinquished her rights to the house and presented Chartwell to the National Trust. It was opened to the public in 1966, one year after Churchill's death.

=== National Trust: 1966 to the present ===
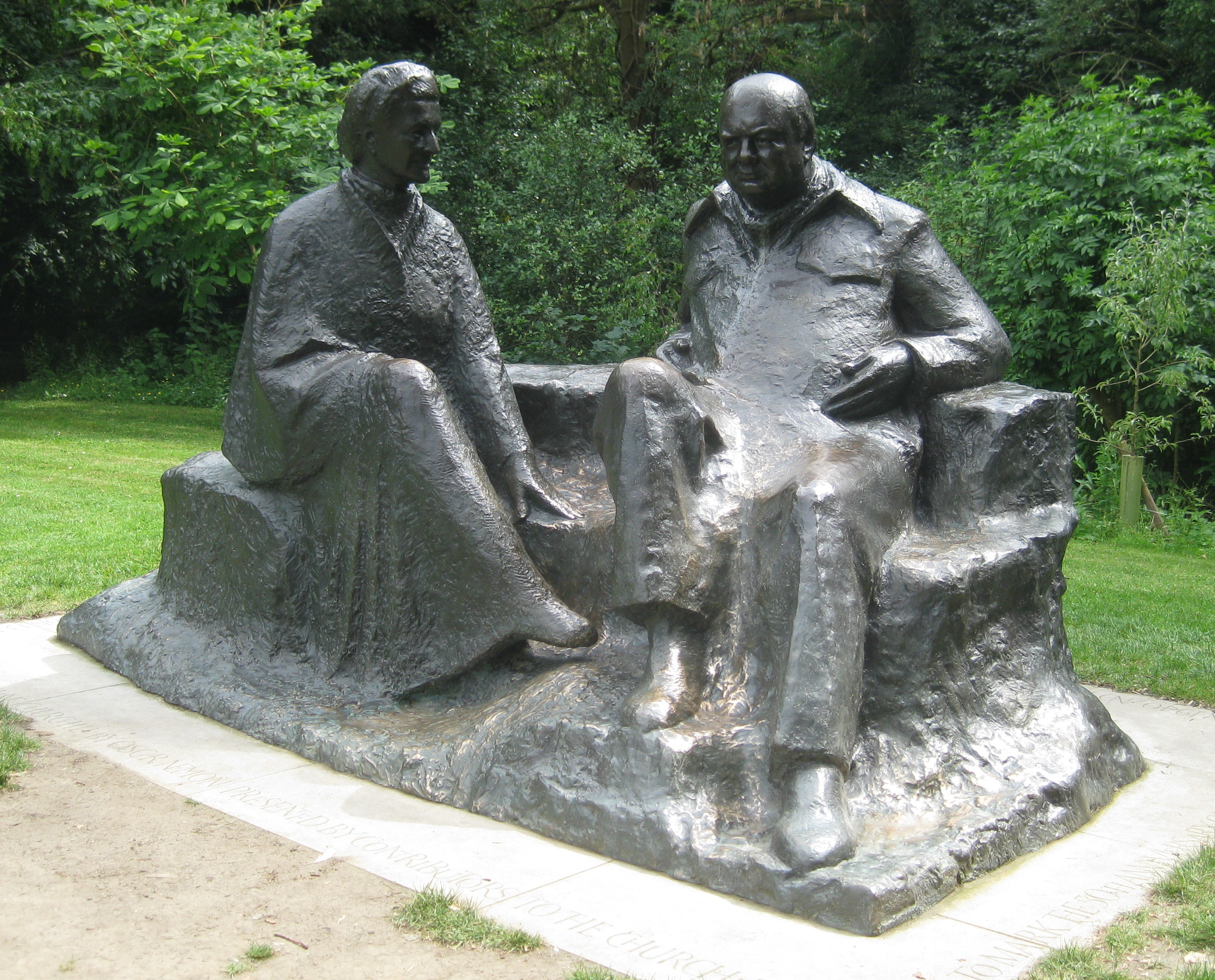
Oscar Nemon's statue of Churchill and Lady Churchill at Chartwell

The house has been restored and preserved as it looked in the 1920–30s; at the time of the Trust's purchase, Churchill committed to leaving it, "garnished and furnished so as to be of interest to the public". Rooms are decorated with memorabilia and gifts, the original furniture and books, as well as honours and medals that Churchill received. Lady Churchill's long-time secretary, Grace Hamblin, was appointed the first administrator of the house. Earlier in her career, Miss Hamblin had undertaken the destruction of the portrait of Churchill painted by Graham Sutherland. The picture, a gift from both Houses of Parliament on Churchill's 80th birthday in 1954, was loathed by both Churchill and Lady Churchill and had been stored in the cellars at Chartwell before being burnt in secret.

The opening of the house required the construction of facilities for visitors and a restaurant was designed by Philip Jebb, and built to the north of the house, along with a shop and ticket office. Alterations have also been made to the gardens, for ease of access and of maintenance. The Great Storm of 1987 caused considerable damage, with twenty-three trees being blown down in the gardens. Greater destruction occurred in the woodland surrounding the house, which lost over seventy per cent of its trees.

Chartwell has become among the National Trust's most popular properties; in 2016, the fiftieth anniversary of its opening, 232,000 people visited the house. (Note: The most recent visitor numbers, for 2018, were 246,336.) In that year the Trust launched the Churchill's Chartwell Appeal, to raise £7.1M for the purchase of hundreds of personal items held at Chartwell on loan from the Churchill family. The items available to the Trust include Churchill's Nobel Prize in Literature awarded to him in 1953. (Note: In 2005 the Trust organised an exhibition at Chartwell, to commemorate the fortieth anniversary of his death and the opening of the house. The accompanying catalogue, Churchill: Gifts for a hero, focussed on over thirty presents given to Churchill in his lifetime including the Croix de la Libération, his honorary US citizenship, and a large number of cigar boxes.) The citation for the award reads, "for his mastery of historical and biographical description as well as for brilliant oratory in defending exalted human values". The medal is displayed in the museum room on the first floor of Chartwell, at the opposite end of the house to the study, the room where, in the words used by John F. Kennedy when awarding him honorary citizenship of the United States, Churchill "mobilized the English language and sent it into battle". (Note: As Churchill was too unwell to travel to the United States to receive his honorary citizenship, it was accepted on his behalf by his son, Randolph. In his reply, Churchill spoke of the wartime alliance between Britain and the USA; "Our comradeship and our brotherhood in the war were unexampled. We stood together, and because of that fact the free world now stands".)

== Architecture and description ==
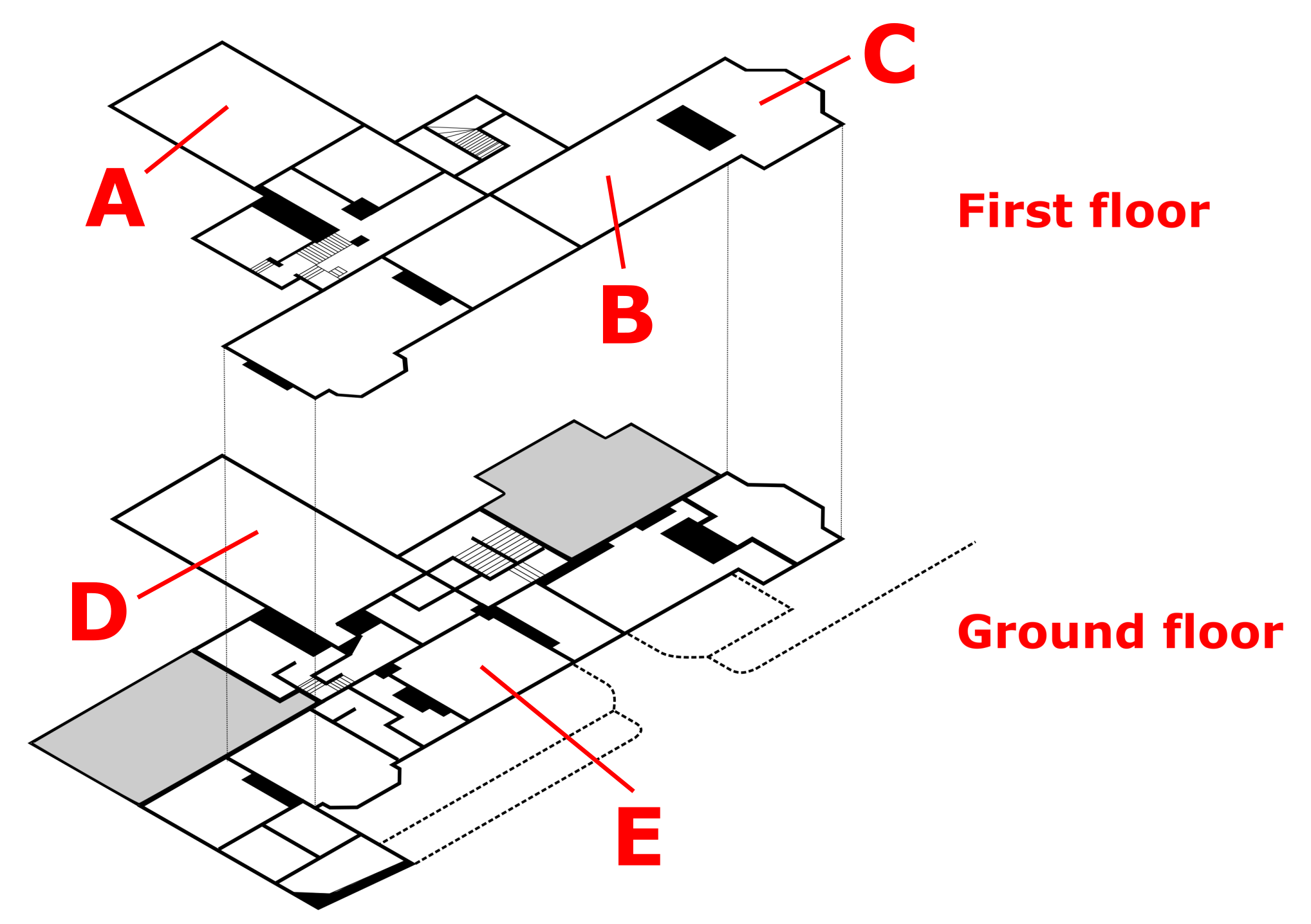
Simplified plan of the house; A – Lady Churchill's bedroom; B – Study; C – Churchill's bedroom; D – Drawing Room; E – Library

The highest point of the estate is approximately 650 feet above sea level, and the house commands views across the Weald of Kent. The view from the house was of crucial importance to Churchill; years later, he remarked, "I bought Chartwell for that view." (Note: Lord Moran, Churchill's physician from 1940 until the latter's death, recorded Chartwell's pull upon his patient, "He loves Chartwell, although there is nothing there except a rather ordinary house - and the Weald.")

=== Exterior ===
Churchill employed the architect Philip Tilden, who worked from 1922 to 1924 to modernise and extend the house. Tilden was a "Society" architect who had previously worked for Churchill's friend Philip Sassoon at his Kent home, Port Lympne, and had designed Lloyd George's house, Bron-y-de, at Churt. The architectural style is vernacular. The house is constructed of red brick, of two storeys, with a basement and extensive attics. The 18th-century doorcase in the centre of the entrance front was purchased from a London antiques dealer. The architectural historian John Newman considered it, "large and splendid and out of place". The garden wall on Mapleton Road is modelled on that at Quebec House, the home of General Wolfe in nearby Westerham.

On the garden front, Tilden threw up a large, three-storey extension with stepped gables, called by Churchill "my promontory", which contains three of the house's most important rooms, the dining room, in the lower-storey basement, and the drawing room and Lady Churchill's bedroom above.

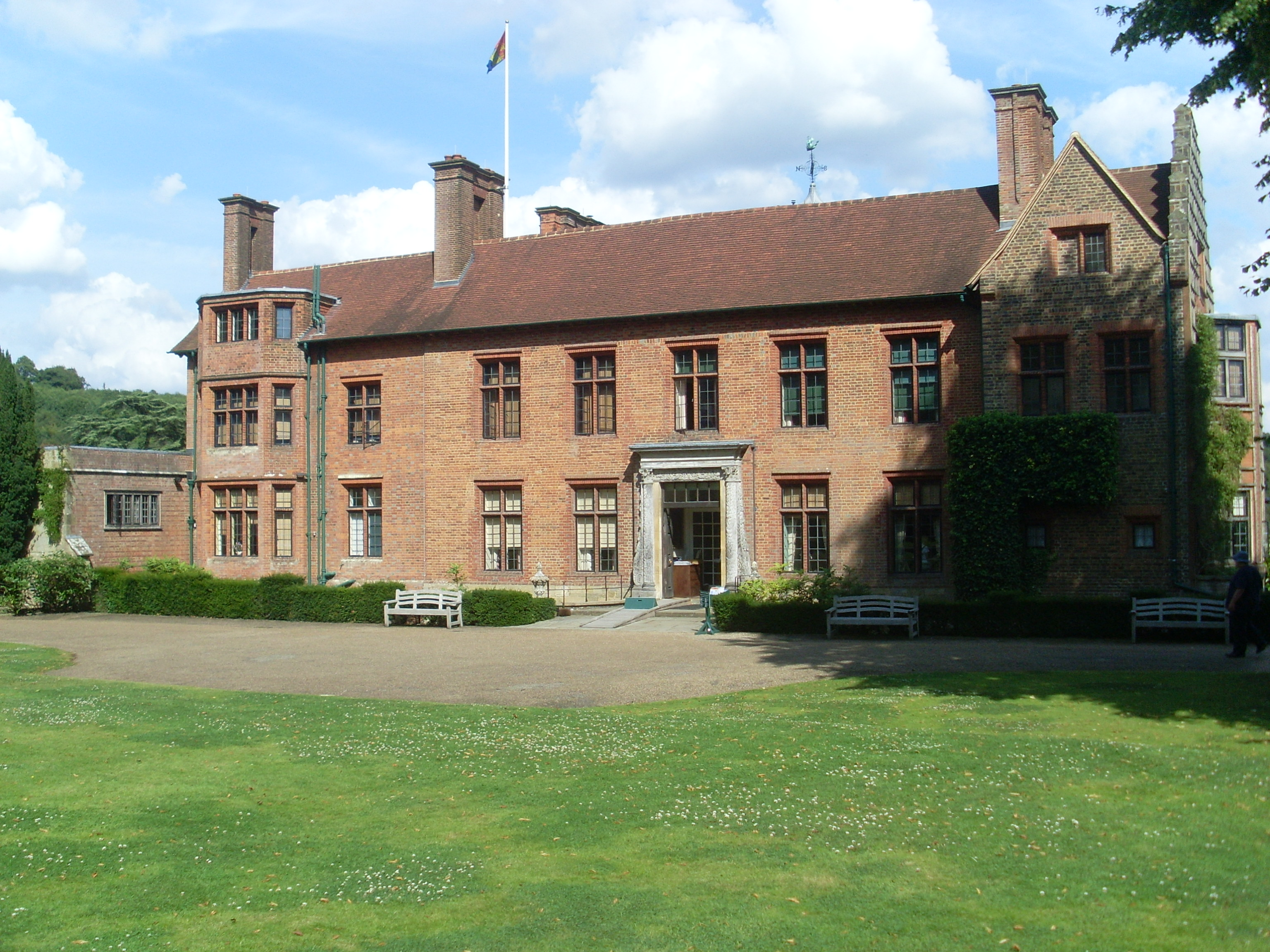
The entrance front – "long, indecisive (and) close to the road"

=== Interior ===
The interior has been remodelled since the National Trust took over the property in 1966, to accommodate visitors and to enable the display of a large number of Churchillian artefacts. In particular, some guest bedrooms have been amalgamated, to allow the construction of the Museum room and the Uniform room. Nevertheless, the majority of the principal rooms have been reconstructed and furnished as they were in the 1920s–1930s and are open to the public, with the current exception of Churchill's own bedroom.

==== Entrance hall and inner hall, library and drawing room ====
Designed by Tilden, replacing a wood-panelled earlier hall, the halls lead onto the library, the drawing room and Lady Churchill's sitting room. The library contains some major pieces of Churchilliana, including the 1942 siren suit portrait by Frank O. Salisbury (Note: A. L. Rowse described the picture in a record of his visit in 1955. Churchill had invited Rowse to comment on the Tudor sections of his A History of the English-Speaking Peoples and Rowse subsequently described the visit in a memoir.) and a wall-mounted model of Port Arromanches, depicting the Normandy landing site with its Mulberry harbour on D-Day + 109, the 23rd of September 1944. The drawing room was used mainly for receiving guests, and for playing bezique. It contains one of the house's most important paintings, a view of Charing Cross Bridge by Claude Monet. (Note: Robin Fedden's 1968 guide describes this as a view of London Bridge and David Lough's study of Churchill's finances, No More Champagne: Churchill and His Money, titles it Ponte de Londres. The National Trust Collection records it as Pont de Londres (Charing Cross Bridge). The painting was a gift from Emery Reves, Churchill's American publisher.) This unfinished work, undertaken by Monet from his balcony at the Savoy Hotel, subsequently formed a significant element in the negotiations between the executors of Churchill's estate and the National Land Fund over the gifting of many of Chartwell's contents to the National Trust in lieu of death duties.

==== Dining room ====
"It should be comfortable, and give support to the body; it should certainly have arms, which are an enormous comfort. It should be compact. One does not want the Dining Room chair spreading itself, or its legs, or its arms, as if it were a plant ... This enables the chairs to be put close together, which is often more sociable, while at the same time, the arms prevent undue crowding and elbowing"

— Churchill's note on the requirements of a dining chair.

The bottom section of Tilden's "promontory" extension, the dining room contains the original suite of the table and dining chairs designed by Heal's to Churchill's exacting requirements – (see box). An early study for a planned picture by William Nicholson entitled Breakfast at Chartwell hangs in the room. Nicholson, a frequent visitor to Chartwell who gave Churchill painting lessons, drew the study for a finished picture which was intended as a present for Churchill's silver wedding anniversary in 1933 but, disliking the final version, Nicholson destroyed it. The picture depicts the Churchills breakfasting together, which in fact they rarely did, (Note: Adrian Tinniswood's book The Long Weekend: Life in the English Country House Between The Wars, contains a photograph depicting such a breakfast in 1927.) and Churchill's marmalade cat, Tango. The tradition of keeping a marmalade cat at Chartwell, which Churchill began and followed throughout his ownership, is maintained by the National Trust in accordance with Churchill's wishes. In a letter to Randolph written in May 1942, Churchill wrote of a brief visit to Chartwell the previous week, "the goose and the black swan have both fallen victim to the fox. The Yellow Cat however made me sensible of his continuing friendship, although I had not been there for eight months".

Churchill depicted the dining room in one of his own pictures, Tea at Chartwell: 29 August 1927. The scene shows Churchill in one of his dining chairs with his family and guests: Thérèse Sickert, and her husband, Walter Richard Sickert, Churchill's friend and artistic tutor; Edward Marsh, Churchill's secretary; his friends Diana Mitford and Frederick Lindemann; and Clementine, Randolph and Diana Churchill. Above the dining room is the drawing room and, above that, Lady Churchill's bedroom, described by Churchill as "a magnificent aerial bower".

==== Study ====
Churchill's study, on the first floor, was his "workshop for over 40 years" and "the heart of Chartwell". In the 1920s, as Chancellor of the Exchequer, he planned his budgets in the room; in the 1930s, in isolation, he composed his speeches that warned against the rise of Hitler and dictated the books and articles that paid the bills; in 1945, defeated, he retreated here to write his histories; and here, in final retirement, he passed much of his old age. Throughout the 1930s, the study was his base for the writing of many of his most successful books. His biography of his ancestor Marlborough and his The World Crisis were written there, and A History of the English-Speaking Peoples was begun and concluded there, although interrupted by the Second World War. He also wrote many of his pre-war speeches in the study, although the house was less used during the war itself. Tilden exposed the early roof beams by removing the late-Victorian ceiling and inserting a Tudor doorcase. From the beams hang three banners, Churchill's standards as Knight of the Garter and Lord Warden of the Cinque Ports and the Union Flag raised over Rome on the night of 5 June 1944, the first British flag to fly over a liberated capital. The latter was a gift from Lord Alexander of Tunis. The study also contains portraits of Churchill's parents, Lord Randolph Churchill and Lady Randolph Churchill, the latter by John Singer Sargent. The floor is covered with a Khorassan carpet, a 69th birthday gift to Churchill from the Shah of Iran at the Teheran Conference in 1943.

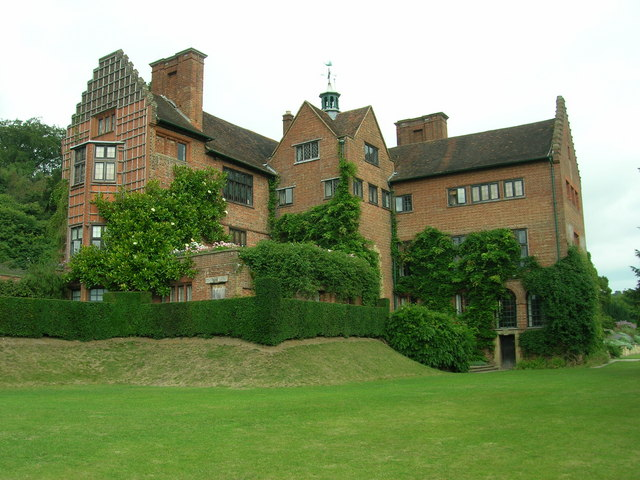
The garden front – "the grouping that mattered"

Beyond the study are Churchill's bedroom and his en suite bathroom, with sunken bath. At the time of the house's opening to the public in 1966, these rooms were not made accessible, at the request of Churchill's family but, shortly before her death in 2014, Churchill's daughter Mary gave permission for their opening, and the Trust plans to make them accessible by 2020.

=== Architectural appreciation ===
Neither the original Victorian house with its extensions, nor Tilden's reconstruction, created a building that has been highly regarded by critics. John Newman noted that the massing of the house on the garden terraces, taking advantage of the Wealden views, was "the grouping that mattered". He dismissed the other side of the house as a, "long, indecisive entrance front close to the road" and the overall composition as of "dull red brick and an odd undecided style". The architectural writer and Chairman of the National Trust Simon Jenkins considered the house, "undistinguished". The National Trust's guidebook describes the original building as "Victorian architecture at its least attractive". The house is Grade I listed but its brief, Historic England listing makes clear that this is "for historical reasons" rather than for its architectural merit. The gardens are Grade II* listed.

== Gardens and estate ==
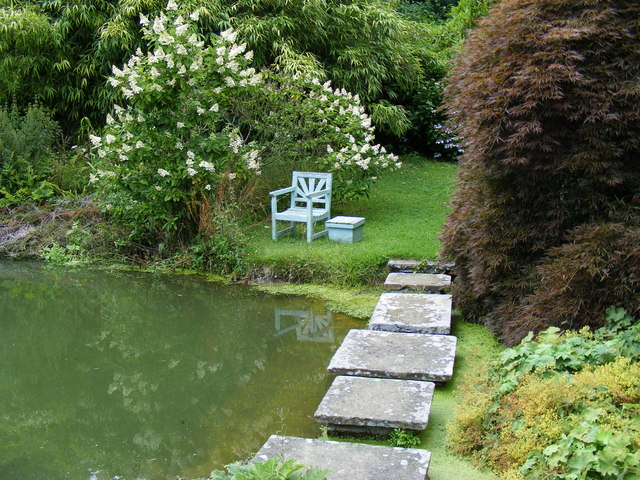
Churchill's seat, from which he fed his golden orfe

The gardens surrounding the house comprise 8 hectares (20 acres), with a further 23 hectares (57 acres) of parkland. They are predominantly the creation of the Churchills, with significant later input from Lanning Roper, Gardens Adviser to the National Trust. The Victorian garden had been planted with conifers and rhododendrons which were typical of the period. The Churchills removed much of this planting while retaining the woodlands beyond. Within the garden proper, they created almost all of the landscape, architectural and water features are seen today. The garden front of the house opens onto a terraced lawn, originally separated from the garden beyond by a ha-ha and subsequently by a Kentish ragstone wall constructed in the 1950s. To the north lies the rose garden, laid out by Lady Churchill and her cousin Venetia Stanley. The nearby Marlborough Pavilion was built by Tilden and decorated with frescos by Churchill's nephew John Spencer Churchill in 1949. Beyond the rose garden is the water garden, constructed by the Churchills and including the golden orfe pond where Churchill fed his fish, and the swimming pool constructed in the 1930s. Churchill sought advice from his friend and scientific guru Professor Lindemann on the optimal methods for heating and cleaning the pool.

To the south is the croquet lawn, previously a tennis court—Lady Churchill was an accomplished and competitive player of both, although Churchill was not. Beyond the lawn are several structures grouped around the Victorian kitchen garden, many of which Churchill was involved in building. He had developed an interest in bricklaying when he bought Chartwell and throughout the 1920s and 1930s constructed walls, a summerhouse and some houses on the estate. In 1928, he joined the Amalgamated Union of Building Trade Workers, a move which caused controversy. Near the kitchen garden is the golden rose walk, containing thirty-two varieties of golden roses, a golden wedding anniversary present to the Churchills from their children in 1958, and Churchill's painting studio, constructed in the 1930s, which now houses a large collection of his artistic works.

South of the terrace lawn are the upper and lower lakes, a scene of Churchill's most ambitious landscaping schemes. The lower lake had existed during the Colquhouns' ownership, but the island within it, and the upper lake, were Churchill's own creations. (Note: Tilden attributed Churchill's lake-building to a desire to outdo his colleague and rival Lloyd George's efforts at his country house, Churt. "Churt had a delicious fish pond, fed by clear streams. Churchill must have a lake - no, two lakes".) On 1 January 1935, while Lady Churchill was on a cruise off Sumatra, Churchill described the beginnings of his endeavours in one of his Chartwell Bulletins; "I have arranged to have one of those great mechanical diggers. In one week he can do more than 40 men can do. There is no difficulty about bringing him in as he is a caterpillar and can walk over the most sloppy fields". Excavation work proved more challenging than Churchill had anticipated; two weeks later he wrote again, "The mechanical digger has arrived. He moves about on his caterpillars only with the greatest difficulty on this wet ground".

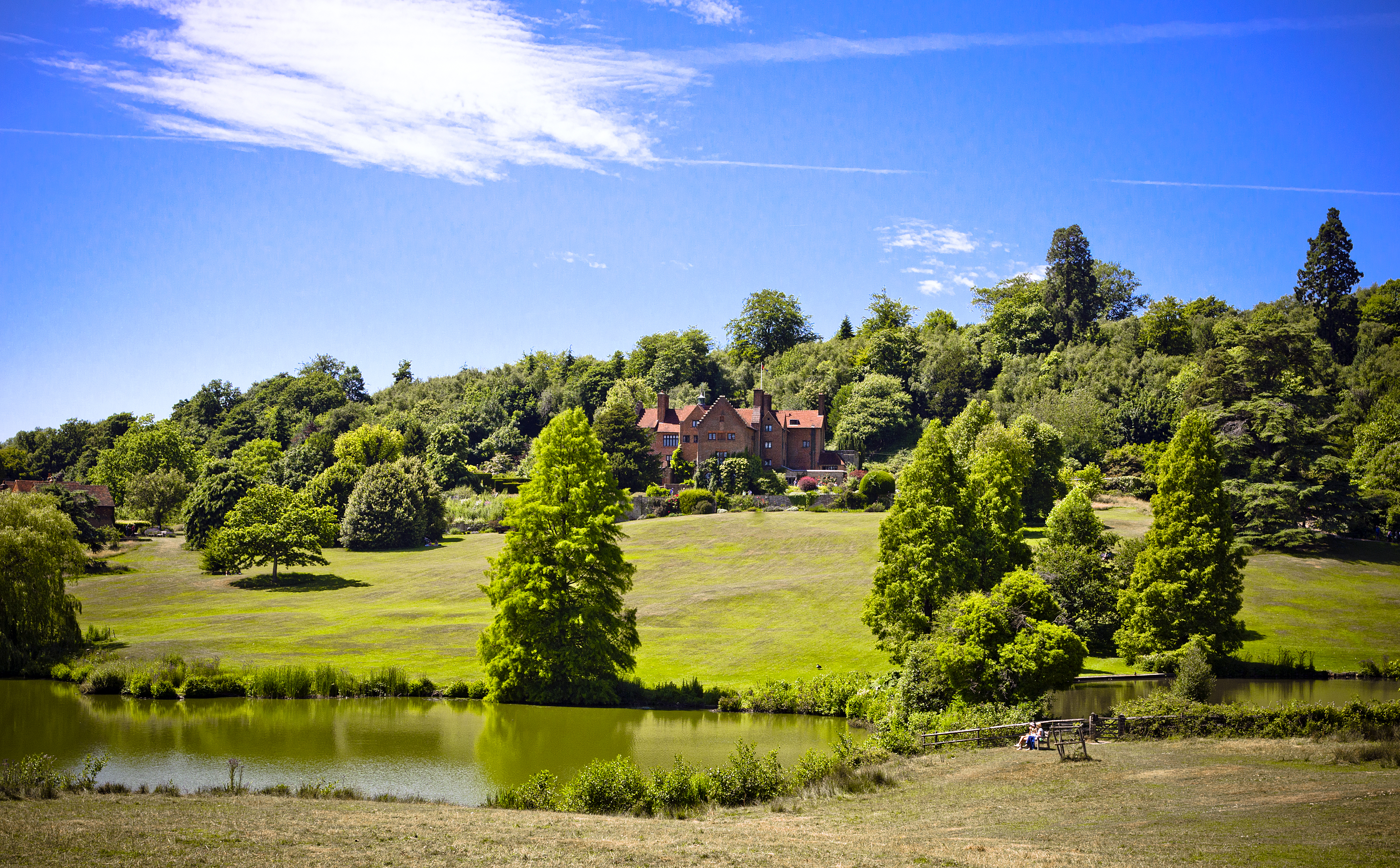
The view of the house from across the lower lake

On the lakes lived Churchill's large collection of wildfowl, including the black swans, a gift from the Australian Government, which restocked the lakes with them in 1975. Churchill had a sentimental attachment to the fauna that lived at Chartwell: his close friend Violet Bonham Carter recalled their conversation in the garden in the early 1950s; "He was bemoaning the fact that the summer had been a bad one for butterflies when suddenly to his delight he saw two Red Admirals alighting on a clump of Buddleia bushes he had planted to attract them. I shall never forget his pleasure".

=== Farms and stables ===
In 1946–47, Churchill extended his land-holdings around Chartwell, purchasing Chartwell Farm and Parkside Farm, and subsequently Bardogs Farm and a market garden. By 1948, he was farming approximately 500 acres. The farms were managed by Mary Soames's husband, Christopher, and Churchill kept cattle and pigs and also grew crops and market vegetables. The farms did not prove profitable, and by 1952 Churchill's operating losses on them exceeded £10,000 a year. By the end of the decade, both the farms and the livestock had been sold.

A more lucrative venture was the owning, and later breeding, of racehorses. In 1949, Churchill had purchased Colonist II, who won his first race, the Upavon Stakes, at Salisbury that year, and subsequently netted Churchill £13,000 in winnings. In 1955, Churchill bought the Newchapel Stud and by 1961 his total prize money from racing exceeded £70,000. In the 1950s, he reflected on his racing career; "Perhaps Providence had given him Colonist as a comfort in his old age and to console him for disappointments".

== See also ==
- 28 Hyde Park Gate (Churchill's home in London)
- Blenheim Palace (Churchill's birthplace in Oxfordshire)
- Churchill Archives Centre (Cambridge)
- Churchill War Rooms (London)

== Sources ==
- Aslet, Clive (2005). Landmarks of Britain. London: Hodder & Stoughton. ISBN 978-0-340-73510-7.
- Bettley, James (1987). Lush and Luxurious: The Life and Work of Philip Tilden 1887–1956. London: Royal Institute of British Architects. OCLC 466189961.
- Bonham Carter, Violet (1965). Winston Churchill As I Knew Him. London: Eyre & Spottiswoode and Collins. OCLC 462232986.
- Buczacki, Stefan (2007). Churchill & Chartwell – The Untold Story of Churchill's Houses and Gardens. London: Frances Lincoln. ISBN 978-0-7112-2535-0.
- Churchill, Winston (1948). The Gathering Storm. The Second World War. Vol. I. London: Cassell & Co. OCLC 162830625.
- ——— (1951). The Hinge of Fate. The Second World War. Vol. IV. London: Cassell & Co. OCLC 812626294.
- ————; Churchill, Clementine (1998). Soames, Mary (ed.). Speaking for Themselves: The Personal Letters of Winston and Clementine Churchill. London: Doubleday. ISBN 978-0-385-40691-8.
- ———— (2007). Churchill, Winston S. (ed.). Never Give In: Winston Churchill's Speeches. London: Pimlico Books. ISBN 978-1-84413-412-0.
- Churchill, Winston S. (1997). His Father's Son: The Life of Randolph Churchill. London: Orion Books. ISBN 978-1-85799-969-3.
- Clarke, Peter (2012). Mr Churchill's Profession: Statesman, Orator, Writer. London: Bloomsbury Publishing. ISBN 978-1-4088-1887-9.
- Clubbe, John (2016). Byron, Sully, and the Power of Portraiture. London: Routledge. ISBN 978-1-138-67557-5.
- Colville, Jock (1985). The Fringes of Power – 10 Downing Street Diaries 1939–1955. London: Hodder & Stoughton. ISBN 978-0-340-38296-7.
- Coombs, David (1967). Churchill - His Paintings. London: Hamish Hamilton. OCLC 3437376.
- Corp, Edward (2004). A Court in Exile: The Stuarts in France, 1689-1718. Cambridge: Cambridge University Press. ISBN 978-0-521-58462-3.
- Don, Alan (2020). Robert Beaken (ed.). Faithful Witness: The Confidential Diaries of Alan Don, Chaplain to the King, the Archbishop and the Speaker, 1931-1946. London: SPCK. ISBN 978-0-281-08398-5.
- Fedden, Robin (1974). Churchill and Chartwell. Oxford: Pergamon Press. OCLC 228659396.
- Garnett, Oliver (2008). Chartwell. Swindon: National Trust Enterprises. OCLC 828689009.
- Gilbert, Martin (1975). Winston S. Churchill 1917–1922. Authorised biography of Winston S. Churchill. Vol. IV. London: Heinemann. OCLC 782000964.
- ——— (1977). Companion Volume, April 1921 – November 1922. Authorised biography of Winston S. Churchill. Vol. IV Part 3. London: Heinemann. OCLC 4354393.
- ——— (1976). Winston S. Churchill 1922–1939. Authorised biography of Winston S. Churchill. Vol. V. London: Heinemann. OCLC 715481469.
- ——— (1983). Finest Hour: Winston S. Churchill 1939–1941. Authorised biography of Winston S. Churchill. Vol. VI. London: Heinemann. ISBN 978-0-434-29187-8.
- ——— (1986). Road to Victory: Winston S. Churchill 1941–1945. Authorised biography of Winston S. Churchill. Vol. VII. London: Heinemann. ISBN 978-0-434-13017-7.
- ——— (1988). Never Despair: Winston S. Churchill 1945–1965. Authorised biography of Winston S. Churchill. Vol. VIII. London: Heinemann. ISBN 978-0-7737-2187-6.
- ——— (1993). The Churchill War Papers: At the Admiralty, September 1939 to May 1940. Authorised biography of Winston S. Churchill. Vol. I. New York and London: W. W. Norton & Company. ISBN 978-0-393-03522-3.
- Greeves, Lydia (2008). Houses of the National Trust. London: National Trust Books. ISBN 978-1-905400-66-9.
- Hastings, Max (2010). Finest Years: Churchill as Warlord 1940–45. London: HarperCollins. ISBN 978-0-00-726368-4.
- Holmes, Richard (2009). Churchill's Bunker: The Secret Headquarters at the Heart of Britain's Victory. London: Profile Books. ISBN 978-1-84668-225-4.
- Ireland, Josh (2021). Churchill & Son. London: John Murray. ISBN 978-1-529-33777-8. OCLC 1263811541.
- Ismay, Hastings (1960). The Memoirs of Lord Ismay. London: Heinemann. OCLC 931311760.
- Jenkins, Roy (1999). The Chancellors. Oxford: Macmillan Publishers. ISBN 978-0-333-73058-4.
- Jenkins, Simon (2003). England's Thousand Best Houses. London: Penguin Books. ISBN 978-0-7139-9596-1.
- Lough, David (2015). No More Champagne: Churchill and His Money. London: Head of Zeus Ltd. ISBN 978-1-78408-182-9.
- Maisky, Ivan (2015). Gabriel Gorodetsky (ed.). The Maisky Diaries: Red Ambassador to the Court of St James's 1932-1943. New Haven, US and London: Yale University Press. ISBN 978-0-300-18067-1. OCLC 939907354.
- Martin, John (1991). Downing Street: The War Years. London: Bloomsbury Publishing. ISBN 978-0-747-50838-0. OCLC 1152732387.
- Montague Browne, Anthony (1995). Long Sunset: Memoirs of Winston Churchill's Last Private Secretary. London: Cassell & Co. ISBN 978-0-304-34478-9.
- Newman, John (2002). West Kent and The Weald. Pevsner Buildings of England. New Haven and London: Yale University Press. ISBN 978-0-300-09614-9.
- ——— (2012). Kent: West and The Weald. Pevsner Buildings of England. New Haven and London: Yale University Press. ISBN 978-0-300-18509-6.
- Pawle, Gerald (1963). The War and Colonel Warden: The Recollections of Commander C. R. Thompson. London: George Harrap & Co. Ltd. OCLC 219890820.
- Reynolds, David (2004). In Command of History – Churchill Fighting and Writing the Second World War. London: Allen Lane. ISBN 978-0-7139-9819-1.
- Roberts, Andrew (2008). Masters and Commanders. London: Allen Lane. ISBN 978-0-06-122857-5.
- ——— (2019). Churchill. London: Penguin Books. ISBN 978-0-241-20563-1.
- Stelzer, Cita (2019). Working With Winston: The Unsung Women Behind Britain's Greatest Statesman. London: Head of Zeus. ISBN 978-1-786-69587-1.
- Stewart, Graham (1999). Burying Caesar: Churchill, Chamberlain and the Battle for the Tory Party. London: Weidenfeld and Nicolson. ISBN 978-0-297-81831-1.
- Tilden, Philip (1954). True Remembrances: The Memoirs of an Architect. London: Country Life. OCLC 636818090.
- Tinniswood, Adrian (2016). The Long Weekend: Life in the English Country House Between The Wars. London: Jonathan Cape. ISBN 978-0-224-09945-5.
- Toye, Richard (2007). Lloyd George & Churchill: Rivals for Greatness. London: Macmillan Publishers. ISBN 978-1-405-04896-5. OCLC 1169990594.
- Walters, Neil (2005). Churchill: Gifts to a Hero. Chartwell, Kent: National Trust. OCLC 61770522.
- Wilson, Charles (2006). Churchill: The Struggle for Survival 1945-1960. New York, USA: Carroll & Graf. OCLC 63750476.
