= Portrait of Winston Churchill (Sutherland) =

1954 painting by Graham Sutherland

- Artist: Graham Sutherland
- Year: 1954
- Medium: oil on canvas
- Location: Destroyed

The Portrait of Winston Churchill was a painting by English artist Graham Sutherland that depicted the British prime minister Sir Winston Churchill, created in 1954. It was disliked by Churchill and within a year it was destroyed.

In 1954, Sutherland was commissioned to paint a full-length portrait of Prime Minister Sir Winston Churchill. Sutherland received 1,000 guineas for the painting, a sum funded by donations from members of the House of Commons and House of Lords. The painting was presented to Churchill by both Houses of Parliament at a public ceremony in Westminster Hall on his 80th birthday on 30 November 1954.

Finding the depiction deeply unflattering, Churchill disliked the portrait intensely. After its public presentation, the painting was taken to his country home at Chartwell but not displayed. For a long time it was assumed that it was destroyed by Lady Churchill; however, in the course of research for a biography of Churchill, audio recordings were cited that attribute the destruction to Grace Hamblin, Churchill's private secretary. According to this, the painting was taken by her and her brother to a secluded house and burned. Lady Churchill learned of the deed the next morning and approved.

== Background ==
By the time the portrait had been commissioned, Churchill was an elder statesman nearing the end of his second period as prime minister. Sutherland had gained a reputation as a modernist painter through some recent successful portraits, such as Somerset Maugham in 1949. He was drawn to depicting subjects as they truly were without embellishment; some sitters considered his disinclination to flattery as a form of cruelty or disparagement to his subjects.

Sutherland and Churchill had different hopes for the painting. Churchill had wanted to direct the composition towards a fictionalised scene but Sutherland had insisted upon a realistic portrayal, one described by Simon Schama as "No bulldog, no baby face. Just an obituary in paint". Churchill also wished to be depicted in his robes as a Knight of the Garter, but the commission specified that he should be shown in his usual parliamentary dress: a black coat, with waistcoat and striped trousers, and a spotted bow tie.

== Preparation ==
Sutherland made preparatory charcoal sketches of Churchill at a handful of sittings at Chartwell from August 1954, concentrating on Churchill's hands and face. After completing these sketches, he made some oil studies of his subject. Additionally, Sutherland worked from photographs by Elsbeth Juda. He brought his preliminary materials to his studio to create the final work on a large square canvas, the shape chosen to symbolize Churchill's solidity and endurance, embodied in a remark that Churchill made, "I am a rock".

The pose, with Churchill grasping the arms of his chair, recalls the statue of U.S. President Abraham Lincoln at the Lincoln Memorial in Washington, D.C. Churchill is shown scowling, slightly slumped forward, surrounded by wintry grey, brown and black tones. Sutherland was reluctant to discuss the work in progress with Churchill and showed the subject few of his working materials. Lady Spencer-Churchill thought it was a good resemblance – "really quite alarmingly like him" – but also said it made him look too cross, while recognising that it was a familiar expression. Churchill's son Randolph thought the portrait made him look "disenchanted".

== Reception ==
Lady Spencer-Churchill viewed the completed portrait on 20 November 1954 and took a photograph back to her husband. It was his first view of the work and he was deeply upset. He described it to Lord Moran as "filthy" and "malignant", and complained that it made him "look like a down-and-out drunk who has been picked out of the gutter in the Strand." Churchill also declared, "It makes me look as if I were straining a stool" (that is, defecating with difficulty). With ten days remaining, he sent a note to Sutherland stating that "the painting, however masterly in execution, is not suitable" and declared that the ceremony would go ahead without it. In response, Sutherland maintained that he painted the Prime Minister as he truly saw him and that the depiction was an honest and realistic representation. Conservative MP Charles Doughty persuaded Churchill that the presentation had to go ahead to avoid offending the members of Parliament who financed it.

The presentation ceremony at Westminster Hall was recorded by the BBC. In his acceptance speech, Churchill remarked on the unprecedented honour shown to him and described the painting (in a remark often considered a backhanded compliment) as "a remarkable example of modern art", combining "force and candour". Other reactions were mixed; some critics praised the strength of its likeness, but others condemned it as a disgrace. While Aneurin Bevan (a Labour MP and one of Churchill's critics) called it "a beautiful work", Lord Hailsham (a Conservative colleague and friend) called it "disgusting".

Hans Juda (husband of Elsbeth Juda whose Churchill photographs Sutherland had worked from) offered to take the painting, but after two days in the Judas' London house, it was sent back to Chartwell; it is surmised that Churchill felt guilty about giving it away.

The painting was intended to hang in the Houses of Parliament after Churchill's death, but it was instead given as a personal gift to Churchill himself, who took it back to Chartwell and refused to display it. Requests to borrow the painting for exhibitions of Sutherland's work were rejected.

In 1978, it was reported that Lady Spencer-Churchill had destroyed the painting within a year of its arrival at Chartwell, by breaking it into pieces and having them incinerated to prevent it from causing further distress to her husband. Lady Spencer-Churchill had previously destroyed earlier portraits of her husband that she disliked, including sketches by Walter Sickert and Paul Maze. She had hidden the Sutherland portrait in the cellars at Chartwell and employed her private secretary Grace Hamblin and Hamblin's brother to remove it in the middle of the night and burn it in a remote location. Many commentators were aghast at the destruction of the work of art, and Sutherland condemned it as an act of vandalism; others upheld the Churchills' right to dispose of their property as they saw fit.

Some preparatory sketches for Sutherland's painting are held by the National Portrait Gallery, London. It is thought that a copy of the portrait is held at the Carlton Club, also in London, although it is not on display. The Beaverbrook Art Gallery also has some of the studies Sutherland did in preparation for the portrait in its collection. In April 2024 one of Sutherland's studies for the portrait was put on display at Blenheim Palace, before a planned auction in June 2024. It sold for £660,000 ($842,490), the second highest price at auction to date for a portrait of Churchill.

== Cultural references ==
Within the events of the 2016 Netflix series The Crown, the ninth episode of the first season, entitled "Assassins", dramatises the creation, unveiling, and destruction of the portrait. Sutherland is portrayed by Stephen Dillane. Although historical evidence suggests that Lady Spencer-Churchill's secretary and her brother were the ones who actually destroyed the painting, the episode depicts Lady Spencer-Churchill watching it burn on the grounds of Chartwell. The episode won John Lithgow, who played Churchill, a Primetime Emmy Award for Outstanding Supporting Actor in a Drama Series.

== Sources ==
- Gallery of Lost Art
- Winston Churchill, Graham Sutherland (1954), Portrait of the week, No 82, The Guardian, 3 November 2001
- The Secret Churchill Caper That Netflix’s The Crown Didn’t Show, Vanity Fair, 7 November 2016
- Oil sketch of Winston Churchill, by Graham Sutherland, National Portrait Gallery
- Pencil sketch of Winston Churchill, by Graham Sutherland, National Portrait Gallery
- BBC Radio 4: Churchill Portrait Destroyed, winstonchurchill.org
- Byron, Sully, and the Power of Portraiture, John Clubbe, pp. 6–7
- Playing Darts With a Rembrandt: Public and Private Rights in Cultural Treasures, Joseph L. Sax, pp. 37–42
- Changing Perceptions: Milestones in 20th-Century British Portraiture, Elizabeth Cayzer. pp. 52–57
- The Spirit of Place: Nine Neo-Romantic Artists and Their Times, Malcolm Yorke, pp. 141–142
