= John French (photographer) =

English photographer

Leonard John French (1 March 1907 – 21 July 1966) was an English fashion and portrait photographer.

Born in Edmonton, London, French originally trained and worked as a commercial artist, becoming a photographic director in an advertising studio just before World War II, during which he served as an officer in the Grenadier Guards.

In 1948 he set up his own photographic studio. Working originally with the Daily Express he pioneered a new form of fashion photography suited to reproduction in newsprint, involving where possible reflected natural light and low contrast. He also undertook portrait photography. French himself devoted much attention to the set and posing of his models, but left the actual triggering of the shutter to assistants, amongst whom were Terence Donovan and David Bailey.

In 1942 he married Vere Denning (1910–91), a fashion journalist, who gave his photographic archive to the Victoria and Albert Museum. French died of lymphoma in the Royal Marsden Hospital.
