= Graham Sutherland =

English artist (1903–1980)

Graham Sutherland OM
- Born: Graham Vivian Sutherland; 24 August 1903; Streatham, London, England
- Died: 17 February 1980 (aged 76); Trottiscliffe, Kent, England
- Education: Goldsmiths College
- Known for: Painter, etcher, designer
- Notable work: Christ in Glory in the Tetramorph (tapestry at Coventry Cathedral)
- Movement: Abstractionism, Surrealism
- Spouse: Kathleen Barry (m. 1927)
- Awards: Order of Merit
- Patrons: War Artists' Advisory Committee

Graham Vivian Sutherland OM (24 August 1903 – 17 February 1980) was a prolific English artist. Notable for his paintings of abstract landscapes and for his portraits of public figures, Sutherland also worked in other media, including printmaking, tapestry and glass design.

Printmaking, mostly of romantic landscapes, dominated Sutherland's work during the 1920s. He developed his art by working in watercolours before switching to using oil paints in the 1940s. A series of surreal oil paintings depicting the Pembrokeshire landscape secured his reputation as a leading British modern artist. He served as an official war artist in the Second World War, painting industrial scenes on the British home front. After the war, Sutherland embraced figurative painting, beginning with his 1946 work, The Crucifixion. Subsequent paintings combined religious symbolism with motifs from nature, such as thorns.

Such was Sutherland's standing in post-war Britain that he was commissioned to design the massive central tapestry for the new Coventry Cathedral, Christ in Glory in the Tetramorph. A number of portrait commissions in the 1950s proved highly controversial. Winston Churchill hated Sutherland's depiction of him and subsequently Lady Spencer-Churchill had the painting destroyed.

During his career, Sutherland taught at a number of art colleges, notably at Chelsea School of Art and at Goldsmiths College, where he had been a student. In 1955, Sutherland and his wife purchased a property near Nice. Living abroad led to something of a decline in his status in Britain. However, a visit to Pembrokeshire in 1967, his first trip there in nearly twenty years, led to a creative renewal that went some way toward restoring his reputation as a leading British artist.

== Biography ==
=== Early life ===
Graham Sutherland was born in Streatham, London, the eldest of three children of George Humphrey Vivian Sutherland (1873–1952), a barrister who later became a civil servant in the Land Registry and the Board of Education, and his wife Elsie (1877–1957), née Foster. Both were amateur painters and musicians. Graham Sutherland attended Homefield Preparatory School in Sutton and was then educated at Epsom College in Surrey until 1919. Upon leaving school, after some preliminary coaching in art, Sutherland began an engineering apprenticeship at the Midland Railway locomotive works in Derby where several members of the extended Sutherland family had previously worked. After a year, Sutherland succeeded in persuading his father that he was not destined for a career in engineering and that he should be allowed to study art. After failing to gain a place at his first choice, the Slade School of Art, he entered Goldsmiths' School of Art in 1921, specialising in engraving and etching before graduating in 1926. In both 1925 and 1928, Sutherland exhibited drawings and engravings at the XXI Gallery in London. While still a student, Sutherland established a reputation as a fine printmaker and commercial printmaking would be his main source of income throughout the late 1920s. His early prints of pastoral subjects show the influence of Samuel Palmer, largely mediated by the older etcher, F.L. Griggs.

=== 1930s ===
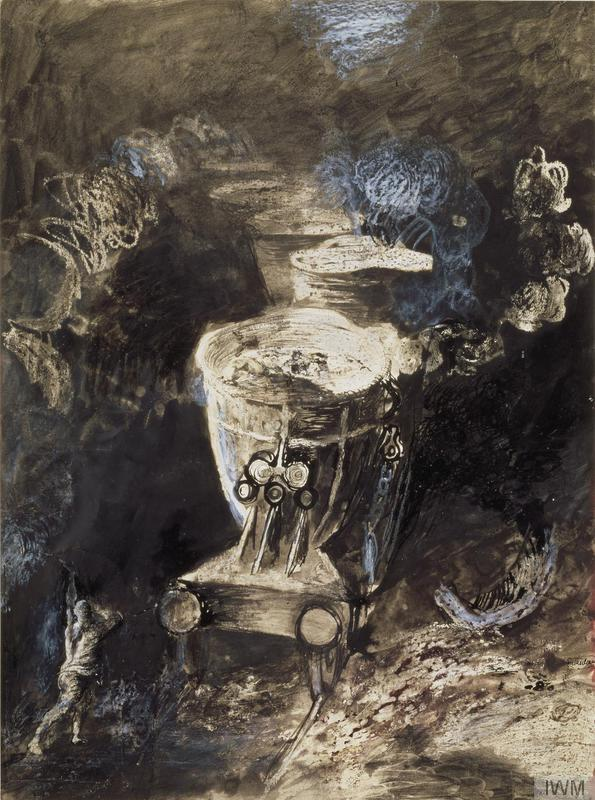
Slag-ladles (1943) (Art.IWM ART LD 1773)

Following the collapse of the print market in the early 1930s due to the Great Depression, Sutherland began to concentrate on painting. His early paintings were mainly landscapes and show an affinity with the work of Paul Nash. In 1934, Sutherland visited Pembrokeshire in Wales for the first time and was profoundly inspired by its landscape. The region remained a source for his paintings for much of the following decade and he visited the area each year until the start of the Second World War. Sutherland focused on the inherent strangeness of natural forms, abstracting them to sometimes give his work a surrealist appearance and in 1936 he exhibited at the International Surrealist Exhibition in London. As the 1930s progressed and the political situation in Europe grew worse, he began to depict ominous, distorted human forms emerging from the land. Oil paintings of the Pembrokeshire landscape dominated his first one-man exhibition of paintings, held in September 1938 at the Rosenberg and Helft Gallery in London. It was these oil paintings of surreal, organic landscapes of the Pembrokeshire coast that secured his reputation as a leading British modern artist.

Alongside oil painting, Sutherland also took up glass, fabric, and poster design during the 1930s, and taught engraving at the Chelsea School of Art from 1926. Between 1935 and 1940, he also taught composition and book illustration at Chelsea. Sutherland converted to Catholicism in December 1926, the year before his marriage to Kathleen Barry (1905–1991), who had been his fellow student at Goldsmiths College. The couple, who were inseparable, lived at various locations in Kent before eventually buying a property in Trottiscliffe in 1945.

=== World War Two ===
At the start of World War Two, the Chelsea School of Art closed for the duration of the conflict and Sutherland moved to rural Gloucestershire. Between 1940 and 1945, Sutherland was employed as a full-time, salaried artist by the War Artists' Advisory Committee. He recorded bomb damage in rural and urban Wales towards the end of 1940, then bomb damage caused by the Blitz in the City and East End of London. Almost all of Sutherland's paintings of bomb damage from the Blitz, either in Wales or in London, are titled Devastation:... and as such form a single body of work reflecting the needs of war-time propaganda, with precise locations not being disclosed and human remains not shown. A number of features reoccur within this body of work, for example, the fallen lift shafts that were often the most recognizable aspect of larger bombed buildings and a double row of bombed houses Sutherland saw in the Silvertown area of the East End.

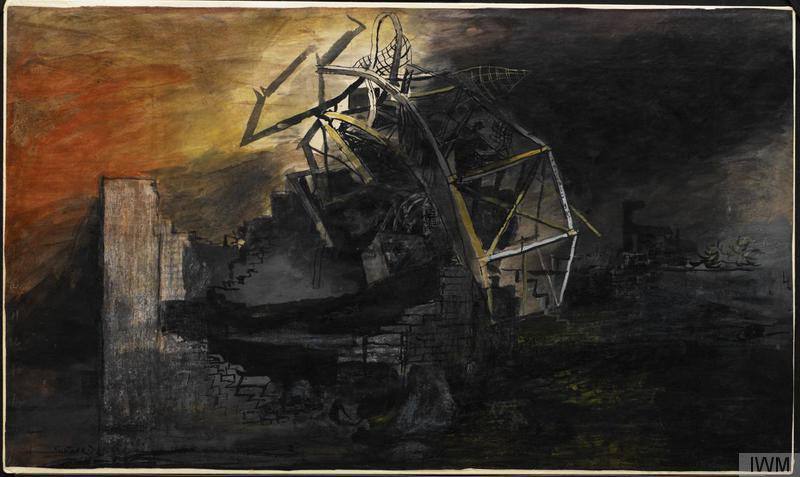
The City a fallen lift shaft (1941) (Art.IWM ART LD 893)

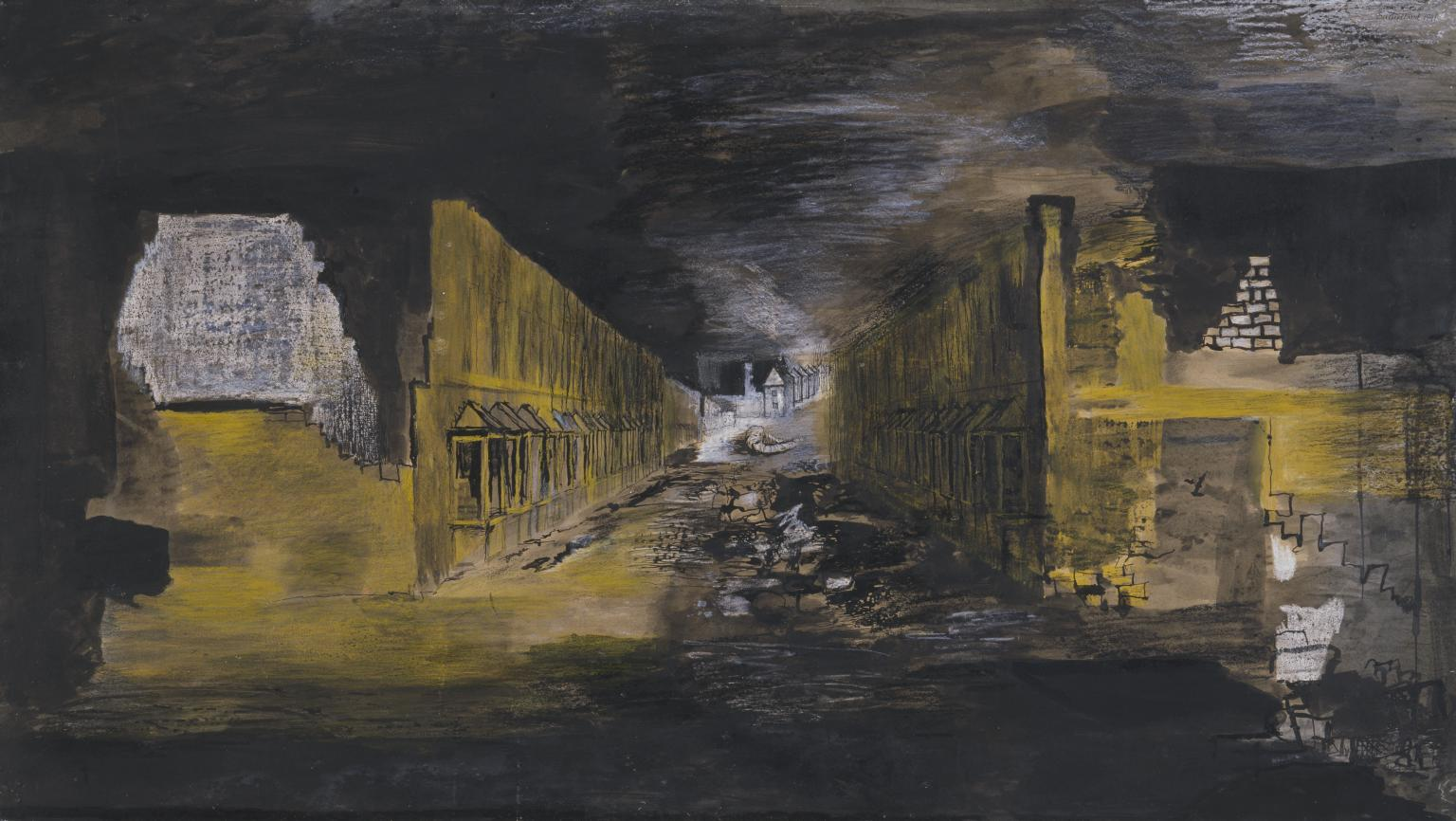
Devastation, 1941: An East End Street (Tate)

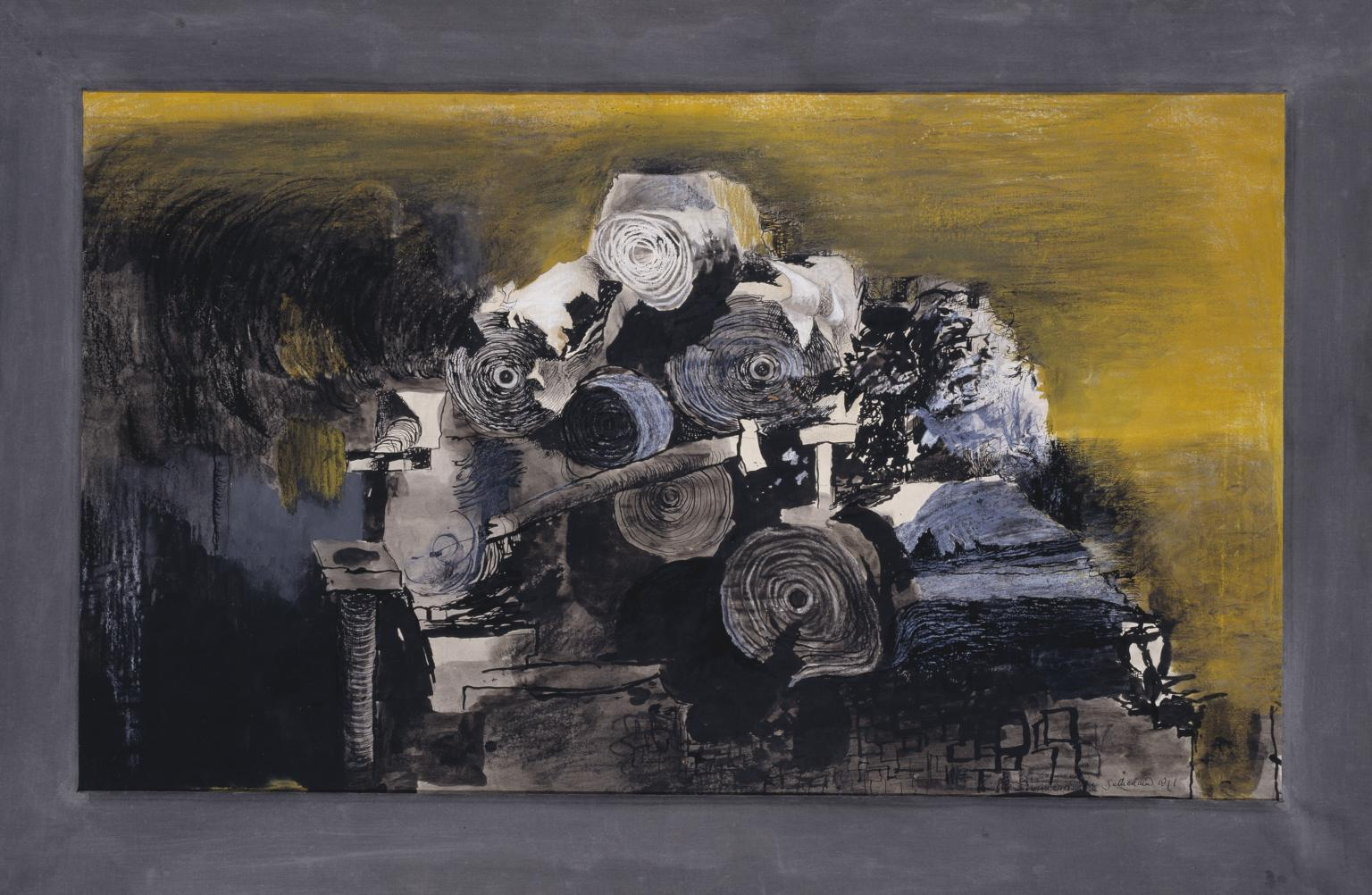
Devastation, 1941: East End, Burnt Paper Warehouse (Tate)

Sutherland returned to Wales in September 1941 to work on a series of paintings of blast furnaces. From June 1942, he painted further industrial scenes, first at tin mines in Cornwall, then at a limestone quarry in Derbyshire, and then at open-cast and underground coal mines in the Swansea area of South Wales. Sutherland spent four months from the end of March 1944 at the Royal Ordnance Factory at Woolwich Arsenal working on a series of five paintings for WAAC. In December 1944, he was sent to depict the damage inflicted by the RAF on the railway yards at Trappes and on the flying bomb sites at Saint-Leu-d'Esserent in France. In all, Sutherland completed some 150 paintings as part of his WAAC commission.

=== Post-war career ===
In 1944, Sutherland was commissioned by Walter Hussey, the Vicar of St Matthew's Church, Northampton, and an important patron of modern religious art, to paint The Crucifixion (1946). This was Sutherland's first major religious painting and his first large figure study. The Crucifixion shows a pale Christ with broken limbs and was followed by a series of paintings that combined abstract forms from nature, usually the spikes and points of thorns, with religious iconography. A subsequent series, Origins of the Land, developed this approach, showing combinations of rocks and fossils in increasingly complex and abstract designs.

In 1946, Sutherland had his first exhibition in New York. That same year, he also taught painting at Goldsmiths' School of Art. From 1947 into the 1960s, his work was inspired by the landscape of the French Riviera, and he spent several months there each year. Eventually, in 1955, he purchased the villa Tempe à Pailla, designed by the Irish architect Eileen Gray, at Menton, near the French-Italian border.

=== 1950s ===
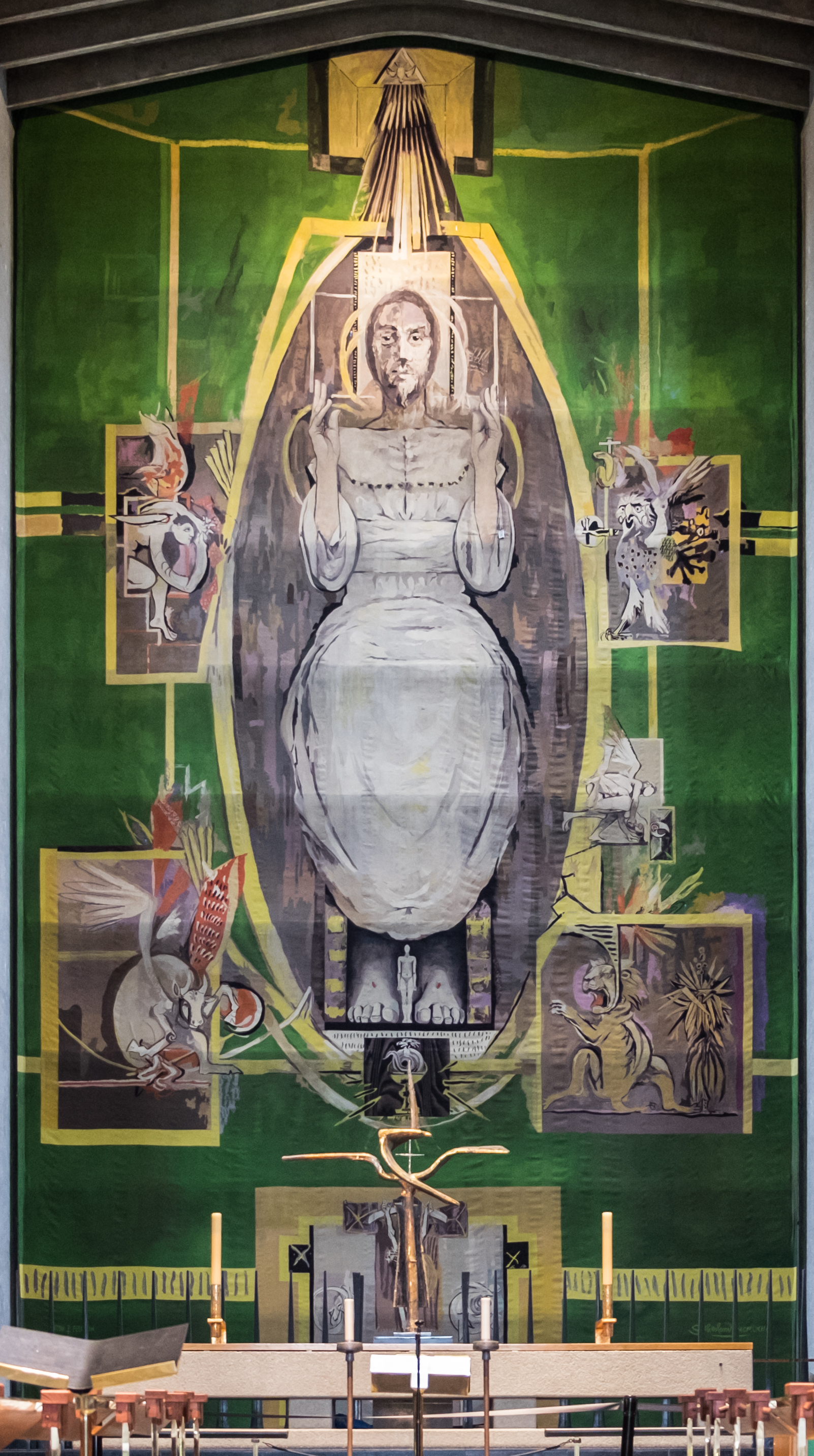
The tapestry Christ in Glory in the Tetramorph in Coventry Cathedral, installed in 1962

Beginning in 1949, alongside his abstract works, Sutherland painted a series of portraits of leading public figures, with those of Somerset Maugham and Lord Beaverbrook among the best known. Beaverbrook regarded his portrait by Sutherland, which clearly depicted him as cunning and reptilian, as both an "outrage" and a "masterpiece". Maugham initially greatly disliked his portrait but came to admire it even though it had been described as making him look "like the madam of a brothel". Sutherland's Portrait of Winston Churchill (1954) greatly upset the sitter, who initially refused to accept its presentation. The elderly Churchill had wanted to direct the composition towards a fictionalised scene but Sutherland had insisted upon a realistic portrayal, one described by Simon Schama as "No bulldog, no baby face. Just an obituary in paint". After initially refusing to be presented with it at all, Churchill accepted the painting disparagingly as “a remarkable example of modern art". Although the painting was subsequently destroyed on the orders of Lady Spencer-Churchill, some of Sutherland's studies for the portrait have survived. In all, Sutherland painted more than fifty portraits, often of European aristocrats or senior businessmen. Following the Churchill portrait, Sutherland's portraits of, among others, Konrad Adenauer and the Queen Mother established him as something of an unofficial state portrait painter. This status was underlined by the award of the Order of Merit in 1960.

In 1951, Sutherland was commissioned to produce a large work for the Festival of Britain. He exhibited in the British Pavilion at the Venice Biennale in 1952 along with Edward Wadsworth and the New Aspects of British Sculpture Group. From 1948 until 1954, Sutherland served as a trustee of the Tate gallery.

In early 1954, Sutherland was commissioned to design a monumental tapestry for the new Coventry Cathedral. Christ in Glory in the Tetramorph took three years to complete and was installed in 1962. To complete the work, Sutherland visited the weavers, Pinton Frères of Felletin in France, on nine occasions.

=== Later life ===
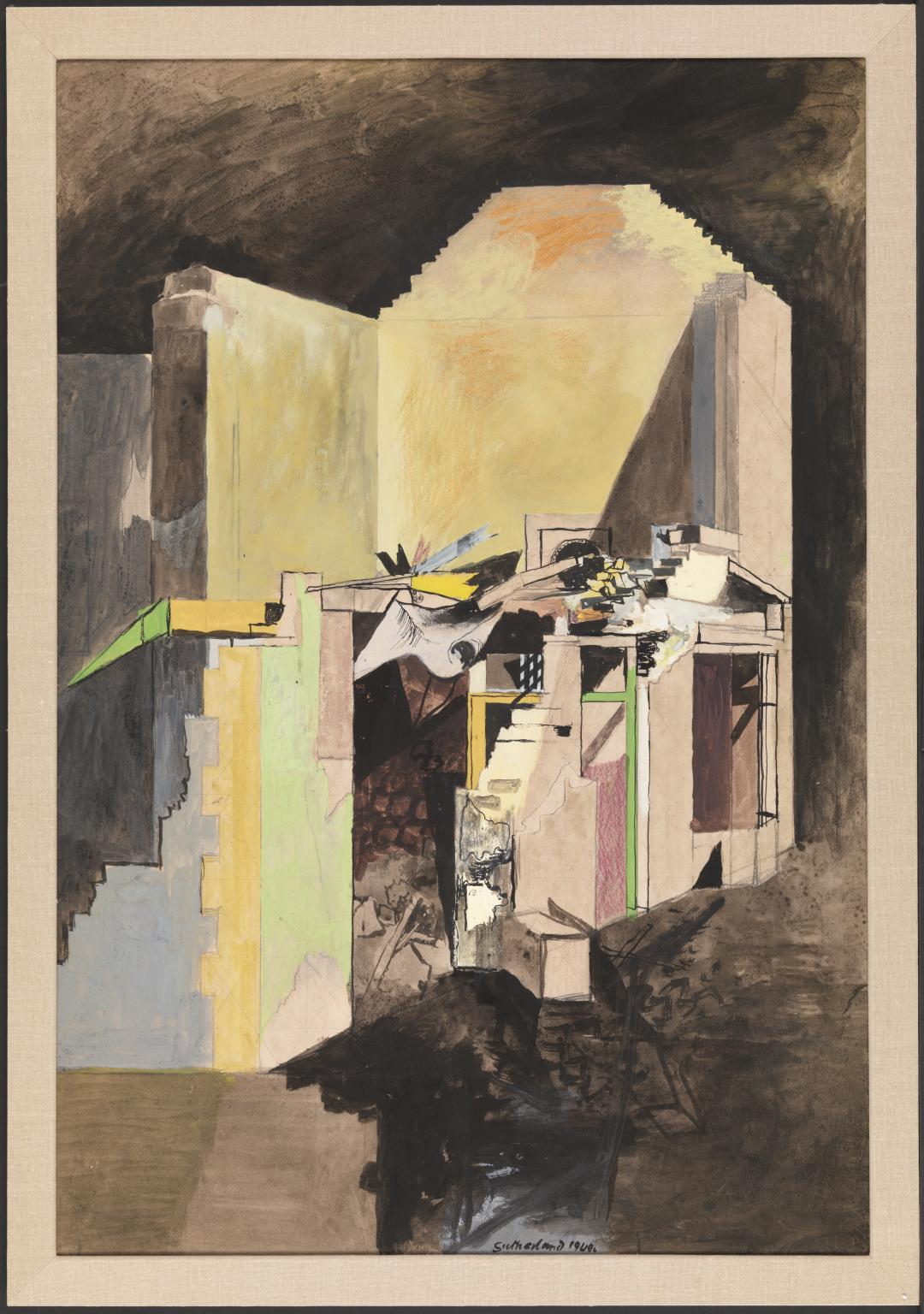
Devastation, 1940, A House on the Welsh Border (Tate)

From his portrait work, Sutherland acquired several patrons in Italy and took to spending the summer in Venice. However, in 1967, for an Italian television documentary, Sutherland visited Pembrokeshire for the first time in more than twenty years and became inspired by the landscape to regularly work in the region until his death. Living abroad had led to something of a decline in his status in Britain, but his return to working in Pembrokeshire went some way toward restoring his reputation as a leading British artist. Much of his work from this point until the end of his life incorporates motifs taken from the area, such as the estuaries at Sandy Haven and Picton. His work from this period includes two suites of prints The Bees (1976–77) and Apollinaire (1978–79).

There were major retrospective shows at the Institute of Contemporary Arts in 1951, the Tate in 1982, the Musée Picasso, Antibes, France in 1998 and the Dulwich Picture Gallery in 2005. A major exhibition of rarely seen works on paper by Sutherland, curated by artist George Shaw, was shown in Oxford, in 2011–12.

Sutherland died in 1980 and was buried in the graveyard of the Church of St Peter and St Paul in Trottiscliffe, Kent.

== Art market ==
The highest price reached by one of his paintings at the art market was when The Crucifixion (1947) sold by $1,156,549 at Sotheby's London, on 15 June 2011.

== Legacy ==
The main building of Coventry School of Art and Design, part of Coventry University, is named after Sutherland. A radio play, Portrait of Winston, by Jonathan Smith, is a dramatisation of his portrait of Winston Churchill. The same incident features in the Netflix series, The Crown, in which Sutherland is played by Stephen Dillane, and was discussed by Simon Schama in his 2015 BBC television series The Face of Britain by Simon Schama. Works by Sutherland are held in the collections of Amgueddfa Cymru – Museum Wales, Art Gallery of Western Australia, Bristol Museum and Art Gallery, Doncaster Museum and Art Gallery, Huddersfield Art Gallery, Herbert Art Gallery and Museum, Manchester Art Gallery, National Portrait Gallery, Norwich Castle Museum and Art Gallery, Northampton Museums and Art Gallery, Pallant House Gallery, Southampton City Art Gallery, The Ingram Collection of Modern British and Contemporary Art, Tenby Museum and Art Gallery, The Fitzwilliam Museum, The Priseman Seabrook Collection, and The Phillips Collection.

In April 2025, an English Heritage blue plaque was dedicated to him at his childhood home, on Dorset Road in Merton Park, South London.

== Honours and awards ==
- 1960 – Order of Merit
- 1962 – Honorary Doctor of Letters, Oxford University
- 1972 – Honorary Fellow of the American Academy of Arts and Letters
- 1973 – Commandeur des Arts et Lettres, France
- 1973 – Fellow of the Accademia di San Luca, Italy
- 1974 – Shakespeare Prize, Hamburg
- Honorary Member of the Printmakers Council.
