= Alex Chisholm =

British Civil servant

Sir Alex Chisholm KCB
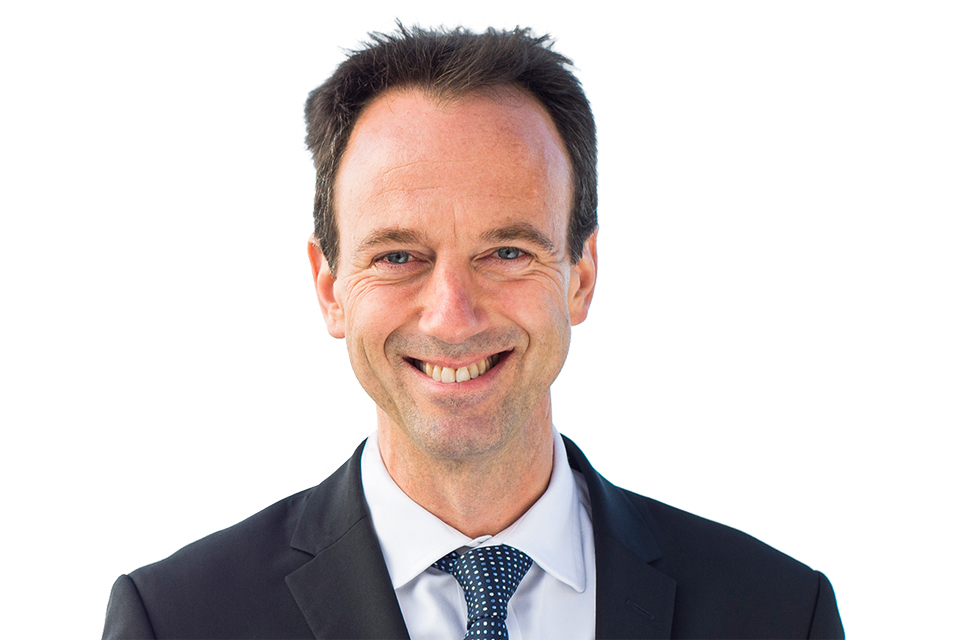

Cabinet Office Permanent Secretary
- In office 14 April 2020 – 2 April 2024
- Deputy: James Bowler; Sue Gray
- Cabinet Secretary: Sir Mark Sedwill; Simon Case
- Chancellor: Michael Gove; Steve Barclay; Kit Malthouse; Nadhim Zahawi; Oliver Dowden
- Preceded by: Sir John Manzoni
- Succeeded by: Cat Little

Chief Operating Officer of the Civil Service
- In office 14 April 2020 – 2 April 2024
- Head: Sir Mark Sedwill; Simon Case
- Minister: Boris Johnson; Liz Truss; Rishi Sunak
- Preceded by: Sir John Manzoni (Note: Manzoni served as Chief Executive of the Civil Service)
- Succeeded by: Cat Little

Permanent Under-Secretary of State for Business, Energy and Industrial Strategy
- In office 5 September 2016 – 14 April 2020
- Prime Minister: Theresa May; Boris Johnson
- Minister: Greg Clark; Andrea Leadsom; Alok Sharma
- Preceded by: Sir Martin Donnelly
- Succeeded by: Sarah Munby

Personal details
- Born: 2 January 1968 (age 58)
- Children: Aidan Chisholm, Ciarán Chisholm, Gabriel Chisholm
- Education: Merton College, Oxford; INSEAD

Sir Alexander James Chisholm KCB (born 2 January 1968) is a British civil servant and former regulator, who served as Cabinet Office Permanent Secretary and the chief operating officer of the United Kingdom's Civil Service between April 2020 and April 2024.

He was previously the permanent secretary at the Department for Business, Energy and Industrial Strategy from September 2016 to April 2020 and permanent secretary at the Department for Energy and Climate Change during 2016. Chisholm was previously the chief executive of the United Kingdom's Competition and Markets Authority and chair of the Irish Commission for Communications Regulation, and has held senior positions in the media, technology and e-commerce industries.

== Early life and education ==
Alex Chisholm was born on 2 January 1968 in London to parents Ian Duncan Chisholm and Annabel Chisholm. His father was a consultant psychiatrist and his mother was a daughter of the 2nd Baron Windlesham. He was privately educated at Downside School before studying history at Merton College, Oxford, and a Master of Business Administration degree at INSEAD.

== Early career ==
Chisholm began work as a civil servant in 1990, working at the Department of Trade and Industry and Office of Fair Trading (OFT) until 1997. He specialised in competition policy and the media, communications and financial services sectors.

He then worked for three years for Pearson plc and the Financial Times, before spending some years working for technology companies, eCountries Inc and Ecceleration Ltd. He also founded and ran Heritage Bulbs, a company specialising in the provision of rare and historic bulbs.

In 2007 Chisholm was appointed as a commissioner of the Commission for Communications Regulation in Ireland, becoming its chair in February 2010. He left the role to become the first chief executive of the Competition and Markets Authority (CMA) in the United Kingdom, with his appointment announced on 8 January 2013. The CMA was formally launched on 1 October 2013 and became fully operational on 1 April 2014. It brought together most of the responsibilities of the former OFT and the former Competition Commission. Chisholm, after taking up his post, was responsible for merging these two bodies and streamlining their operations.

In 2014, the CMA began an inquiry into the banking sector, which was opposed by major banks. The authority found that HSBC and First Trust Bank had broken competition rules. During a talk to the Institute of Directors, he defended the existence of regulators because "some market participants can ruin it for everybody" and that Bitcoin provided "welcome competition". In 2015, Chisholm wrote in a Financial Times article that proposed taxi regulations by Transport for London, following protests against ride-sharing firm Uber, would "artificially restrict competition". In 2016 he announced a CMA report that advocated abolishing passenger rail franchising to allow different companies to run services on the same routes.

== Permanent secretary roles ==
Chisholm was appointed as permanent secretary to the Department of Energy and Climate Change (DECC) in 2016, and continued as permanent secretary for the Department for Business, Energy and Industrial Strategy (BEIS) after it was created nine days later in September 2016 by merging DECC and the Department for Business, Innovation and Skills. His appointment was criticised by OVO Energy founder Stephen Fitzpatrick who said that a CMA inquiry into the energy industry that was run while he was chief executive was "subjected to lobbying from the big six" that resulted in reforms that The Times described as "watered down". The review opposed the introduction of energy price caps, which BEIS introduced in 2019 while Chisholm was its permanent secretary. In November 2024 he was questioned by the Post Office Horizon IT Inquiry on his role in resolving the litigation with subpostmasters while at the Department.

In April 2020 he was appointed as chief operating officer of the civil service and Cabinet Office Permanent Secretary, succeeding John Manzoni. The role, as the civil service's "second in command", includes leading reform of the civil service and advising on the COVID-19 pandemic. He began the new role on 14 April 2020. In February 2024 it was announced that Chisholm would be succeeded by Cat Little.

Chisholm was appointed Knight Commander of the Order of the Bath (KCB) in the 2023 Birthday Honours for public service.

== Personal life ==
Chisholm married Eliza Pakenham, daughter of Thomas Pakenham and granddaughter of the 7th Earl of Longford (Frank Longford), in 1993. They have three sons and live in London. He has been a trustee of Breadline Africa, an international charity, since 2003, and served as its deputy chair.

== Notes ==
Government offices
Preceded by Stephen Lovegrove	Permanent Secretary of the Department for Energy and Climate Change; 2016	Succeeded by himself and Martin Donnelly as Permanent Secretaries, Department for Business, Energy and Industrial Strategy
Preceded by himself as Permanent Secretary, Department for Energy and Climate Change	Permanent Secretary of the Department for Business, Energy and Industrial Strategy; 2016–2020; With: Martin Donnelly (2016)	Succeeded by Sarah Munby
Preceded by Martin Donnelly as Permanent Secretary, Department for Business, Innovation and Skills	Permanent Secretary of the Department for Business, Energy and Industrial Strategy; 2016–2020; With: Martin Donnelly (2016)	Succeeded by Sarah Munby
