= Efficiency and Reform Group =

- Abbreviation: ERG
- Formation: May 2010
- Dissolved: October 2014
- Headquarters: Within HM Treasury building, 1 Horse Guards Road
- Location(s): London, Newport, Norwich and Liverpool
- Region served: United Kingdom
- Minister responsible: Ben Gummer MP, Minister for the Cabinet Office
- chief executive: John Manzoni, chief executive of the Civil Service
- Permanent Secretary: Sir Jeremy Heywood, cabinet secretary
- Parent organization: Cabinet Office
- Website: https://www.gov.uk/government/organisations/efficiency-and-reform-group

The Efficiency and Reform Group (ERG), established in 2010, was part of the Cabinet Office which worked in partnership with HM Treasury to form the corporate centre for UK Government. Its objectives were to reform the way government works and to support the transformation of government services by driving cost savings and focusing on growth.

ERG worked collaboratively with government departments to identify common areas for savings. It aimed to help government departments to deliver at least £20bn of efficiencies in the financial year 2014–15.

The ERG was dissolved in October 2014 as part of the Public bodies transformation programme.

== People ==
The group was led by the chief executive of the Civil Service, John Manzoni.

The group reported to the then Minister for Cabinet Office, Ben Gummer. It also worked in partnership with HM Treasury.

== Ways of working ==
ERG works to achieve these savings in five different clusters:

1. Corporate – implementing management information and spending controls and developing the next wave of efficiencies.
2. Efficiency – helping government act together as one customer to lower expense.
3. Growth – ensuring all of government acts with one plan and seeking opportunities to stimulate UK growth.
4. Projects – to ensure the success of government's most significant projects.
5. Transformation – transforming public services by delivering digital change and new commercial models.

== See also ==
- gov.uk
- data.gov.uk
