= Antonia Romeo =

British civil servant (born 1974)

Dame Antonia Romeo DCB
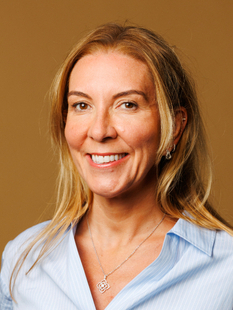
- Official portrait, 2026

Cabinet Secretary; Head of the Civil Service
- Incumbent
- Assumed office 19 February 2026
- Prime Minister: Keir Starmer; Andy Burnham
- Preceded by: Sir Chris Wormald

Permanent Under-Secretary of State at the Home Office
- In office 14 April 2025 – 19 February 2026
- Prime Minister: Sir Keir Starmer
- Home Secretary: Yvette Cooper; Shabana Mahmood
- Preceded by: Sir Matthew Rycroft
- Succeeded by: Simon Ridley (acting)

Clerk of the Crown in Chancery Permanent Secretary of the Ministry of Justice
- In office 18 January 2021 – 11 April 2025
- Monarchs: Elizabeth II; Charles III
- Prime Minister: Boris Johnson; Liz Truss; Rishi Sunak; Keir Starmer
- Lord Chancellor: Robert Buckland; Dominic Raab; Brandon Lewis; Alex Chalk; Shabana Mahmood
- Preceded by: Sir Richard Heaton
- Succeeded by: Jo Farrar

Permanent Secretary of the Department for International Trade
- In office March 2017 – 18 February 2021
- Prime Minister: Theresa May; Boris Johnson
- Secretary of State: Liam Fox; Liz Truss
- Preceded by: Sir Martin Donnelly
- Succeeded by: James Bowler

Foreign Office Director-General for Economic and Domestic Affairs (United States)
- In office February 2015 – October 2015
- Prime Minister: David Cameron
- Preceded by: Melanie Dawes
- Succeeded by: Jonathan Slater

Her Majesty's Consul-General in New York
- In office July 2016 – 2017
- Prime Minister: David Cameron; Theresa May
- Preceded by: Danny Lopez
- Succeeded by: Antony Phillipson

Personal details
- Born: Antonia Rebecca Caroline Angharad Catherine Rice-Evans; 20 October 1974 (age 52) London, England
- Spouse: John Romeo (m. 1999)
- Children: 3
- Education: Brasenose College, Oxford (MA); London School of Economics (MSc)
- Website: gov.uk/government/people/antonia-romeo

Dame Antonia Rebecca Caroline Angharad Catherine Romeo DCB (née Rice-Evans; born 20 October 1974) is a British civil servant who has served as Cabinet Secretary and Head of the Civil Service since February 2026. She has previously held permanent secretary roles at the Home Office, the Ministry of Justice and the Department for International Trade and before that, she was the British consul-general in New York for the Foreign and Commonwealth Office and concurrently director-general for economic and commercial affairs in the USA.

== Early life and education ==
Antonia Rice-Evans was born on 20 October 1974 in London, England, to Peter Rice-Evans and his wife, Catherine. Her mother worked full-time as a professor of biochemistry. She was educated at North London Collegiate School and then Westminster School. She studied philosophy, politics and economics at Brasenose College, Oxford, and earnt a BA degree, subsequently upgraded to an MA (Oxon) degree. Her tutor at Oxford, Sir Vernon Bogdanor, said "Her particular interests were in game theory and in money and banking."

== Career ==
In 1996, Romeo joined the strategic consultancy firm Oliver Wyman where she worked for three years. In 1999, she left the firm and earned an MSc degree in economics from the London School of Economics.

=== Joining the Civil Service ===
In 2000, Romeo applied for a one-year temporary contract as a professional economist in the Lord Chancellor's Department. In a 2016 interview with Management Today, Romeo stated that at the time she "barely knew what the civil service did."

In 2004, returning to work after the birth of her first child, she became the head of the Information Rights Division within the new Department for Constitutional Affairs, in charge of freedom of information and related government policies.

In 2006, she became principal private secretary to the Lord Chancellor – initially Charles Falconer, then from 2007 Jack Straw.

In 2008, she transferred to the Foreign and Commonwealth Office as the Director of the Whitehall Liaison Department, responsible for the FCO's relations with intelligence agencies and other government departments. She left the role in 2010.

=== Cabinet Office ===
Following the 2010 United Kingdom general election and the subsequent formation of the Cameron–Clegg coalition, Romeo transferred to the Cabinet Office as the Executive Director in the new Efficiency and Reform Group under Francis Maude. The group was responsible for reforming the government's governance and board model, as well as working with businesses.

=== Ministry of Justice ===
In 2011, after 18 months at the Cabinet Office, Romeo moved back to the Ministry of Justice, taking on the role of Director General, Transformation. She was made responsible for reform and savings programmes, strategy, digital services, communications, group HR and group estates. Two years later, she changed role to Director General, Criminal Justice, taking over from Helen Edwards. Responsible for all criminal justice policy and other major programmes, she delivered a 2.5-year, £1bn programme to reduce reoffending among ex-offenders. She left the role in February 2015 and was succeeded by Indra Morris.

=== Cabinet Office – Economic and Domestic Affairs Secretariat ===
During the 2015 election, Romeo took on the role of director general at the Economic and Domestic Affairs Secretariat and was responsible for delivering the prime minister's top policy priorities. Her work involved coordinating policy advice to the Prime Minister and the Cabinet, oversight of the Implementation Unit, and the operation of the Implementation Task Forces. She later described this as her "dream job". After nine months, she moved with her family to New York. She later said that the Cabinet Secretary Jeremy Heywood had asked her to stay in the civil service, and encouraged her to take on a role in New York as the Government's envoy to the tech sector.

=== Special Envoy to US technology companies ===
From October 2015 to 2016, Romeo served as the government's special envoy to U.S. technology companies. The formal title was "Her Majesty's Government's Envoy to the United States' Communications Service Providers". In this role, she worked with US-based technology firms across prosperity, security, and regulatory issues.

=== Her Majesty's Consul General ===
In July 2016, Romeo became Her Majesty's Consul General in New York, replacing Danny Lopez. Aged forty-one, she became the first woman to hold the position in its two-hundred-and-thirty-one year history. In addition to her duties as Consul General, she was given the additional role of Director General Economic and Commercial Affairs USA, under the auspices of UK Trade & Investment. As DGECA USA, Romeo's responsibilities included oversight of the North American operations of the foreign commercial arm of the UK Government.

In a talk given to Global Citizen magazine in October 2016, she said that following the Brexit vote, the UK was no less committed to its international standing than it was before, stating: "We want to become more globally outward facing. Britain isn't turning in on itself."

Romeo left the role as Director General Economic and Commercial Affairs USA in March 2017, after nine months, when she became permanent secretary of the Trade Department. After taking up her new role, she continued to live in New York until the end of the school year.

During her time in New York, multiple Foreign Office staff raised concerns and she was investigated for bullying and misusing expenses; it was subsequently decided that there was "no case to answer". She repaid expenses incurred on travel to and from London after taking up her new role.

=== Department for International Trade ===
In January 2017, Romeo was appointed as permanent secretary of the Department for International Trade. Her first day was on 27 March 2017, just two days before Article 50 was triggered, a major step in the UK's exit from the European Union. Her team was tasked with ensuring that the UK was prepared to leave the EU on 29 March 2019. During that time, they developed and published a temporary tariff regime, negotiated continuity agreements, and secured continued participation in the GPA to ensure UK businesses could continue to bid for public sector contracts globally. At the DIT, she was in charge of trade policy, trade negotiation and market access arrangements with countries outside the EU, global trade promotion and finance, and inward and outward business investment.

Acting for the DIT in 2019, Romeo brokered a series of engagements between Louis Mosley (Palantir UK), Lord (David) Prior (Conservative Peer, then Chair of NHS England) and then NHSX CEO Matthew Gould. The subsequent NHS contract with Palantir under then Health Secretary Matt Hancock led to a successful lawsuit against the UK Government. The lawsuit was brought by openDemocracy and tech abuse campaigners Foxglove, as a result of a lack of transparency in setting up the contract and redactions of the sources used by the data store.

=== Return to the Ministry of Justice ===
In January 2021, Romeo moved back to the Ministry of Justice as permanent secretary.

In her role as Clerk of the Crown in Chancery, Romeo was responsible for the official record of the Coronation of King Charles III and Queen Camilla as it occurred at Westminster Abbey on 6 May 2023. She authored Charles III's Coronation Roll and presented the Roll and its digital version to the King and Queen at Buckingham Palace in May 2024.

=== Home Office ===
In March 2025, Romeo was appointed permanent secretary of the Home Office, serving Home Secretaries Yvette Cooper and Shabana Mahmood.

=== Cabinet Secretary ===
After Simon Case resigned as cabinet secretary at the end of 2024, Romeo was one of four appointable candidates shortlisted by an expert panel. Prime Minister Keir Starmer chose Chris Wormald for the position in December 2024. After Wormald's resignation in February 2026, Romeo was tipped to be appointed to the role.

Lord McDonald of Salford told Channel 4 News: “The due diligence needs to be thorough. If the candidate mentioned in the media is the one, in my view, the due diligence has some way still to go.” Subsequently, after this, a second official came forward to warn against appointing her as Cabinet Secretary. This contradicts a government press statement saying that the allegations all come from a single grievance made some time ago by a former employee and that all the allegations were dismissed on the basis there was no case to answer. Lord McDonald was subsequently accused of a coded yet devious attack, and of having a vendetta against Romeo.

On 19 February 2026, she was formally appointed as Cabinet Secretary.

=== Other interests ===
As the Civil Service's Gender Champion, one of Romeo's first roles was to set up the Gender Equality Leadership Group, a group of director-general-level gender champions from all departments.

=== Board memberships ===
Romeo is president of the Whitehall Choir, an amateur choir in London. She is a member of the Civil Service Board. She is a trustee of the Donmar Warehouse theatre, and the John Browne Charitable Trust.

== Personal life ==
She is married to John Romeo, a managing partner in charge of North America for Oliver Wyman. They have three children.

Government offices
New title	Director-General, Transforming Justice; Ministry of Justice; 2011–2013	Succeeded by Herself as Director-General, Criminal Justice
Preceded by Helen Edwards as Director-General, Justice Policy	Director-General, Criminal Justice; Ministry of Justice; 2013–2015	Succeeded by Indra Morris
Preceded by Herself as Director-General, Transforming Justice	Director-General, Criminal Justice; Ministry of Justice; 2013–2015	Succeeded by Indra Morris
Preceded by Melanie Dawes	Director-General, Economic and Domestic Secretariat, Cabinet Office; 2015	Succeeded by Jonathan Slater
Preceded by Martin Donnelly	Permanent Secretary for the Department for International Trade; 2017–2021	Succeeded by John Alty (interim)
Preceded by Richard Heaton	Permanent Secretary at the Ministry of Justice; 2021–2025	Succeeded by Jo Farrar
Preceded by Sir Matthew Rycroft	Permanent Under-Secretary of State at the Home Office; 2025–2026	Succeeded by Simon Ridley (acting)
Preceded by Sir Chris Wormald	Head of the Civil Service; Cabinet Secretary; 2026–present	Incumbent
Diplomatic posts
Preceded by Danny Lopez as HM Consul-General NYC and Director-General, USA	Her Majesty's Consul-General in New York, Foreign & Commonwealth Office; 2016–2017	Succeeded by Antony Phillipson
Preceded by Danny Lopez as HM Consul-General NYC and Director-General, USA	Director-General, Economic and Commercial Affairs USA, UK Trade & Investment; 2016–2017	Succeeded by Antony Phillipson
