= John Manzoni =

British Civil servant

Sir John Manzoni KCB
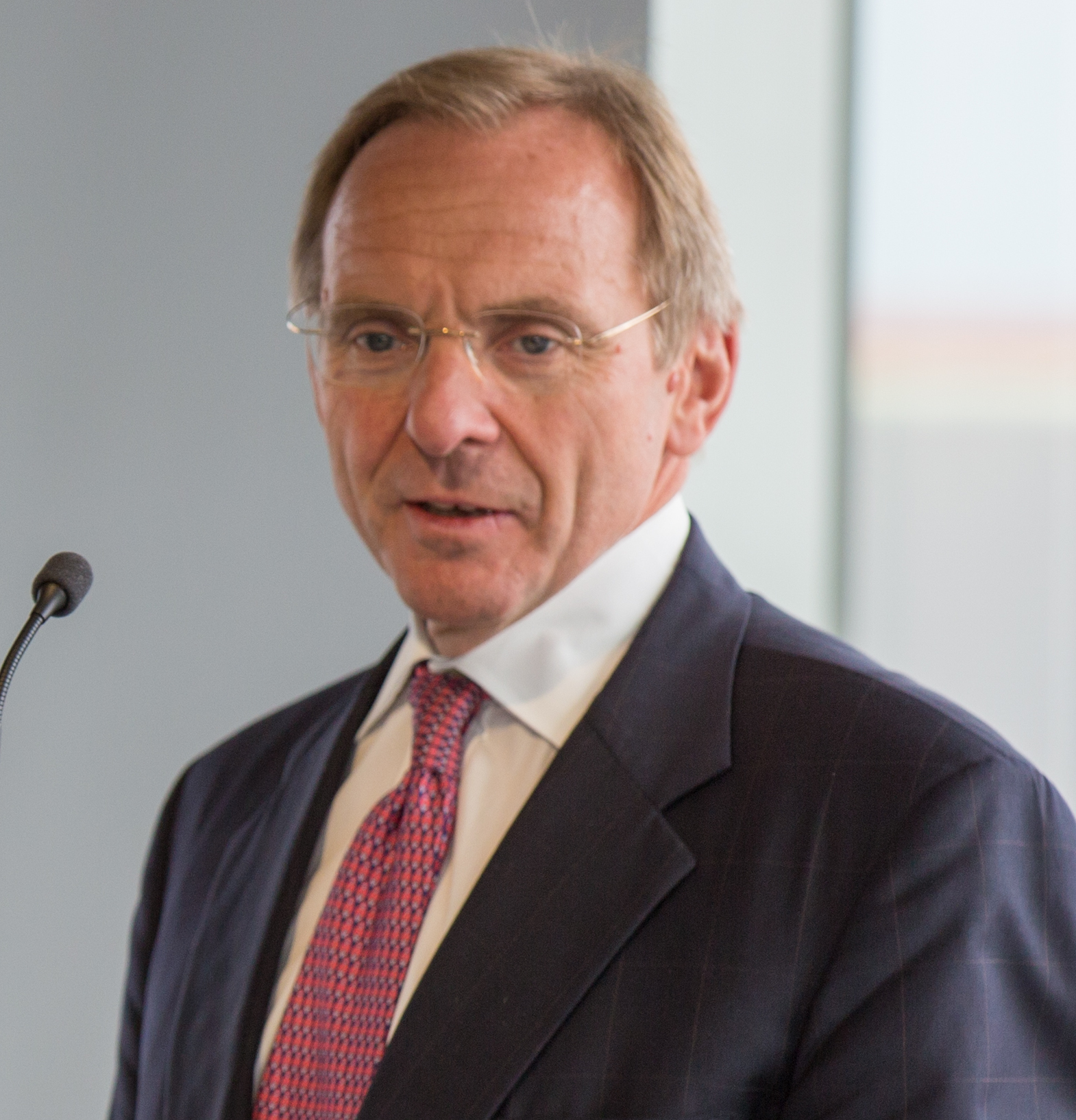
- Manzoni in 2017

Cabinet Office Permanent Secretary
- In office August 2015 – 9 April 2020
- Cabinet Secretary: Jeremy Heywood; Mark Sedwill
- Minister: Matt Hancock; Ben Gummer; Damian Green; David Lidington; Oliver Dowden
- Preceded by: Richard Heaton
- Succeeded by: Alex Chisholm

Chief Executive of the Civil Service
- In office 13 October 2014 – 9 April 2020
- Head: Jeremy Heywood; Mark Sedwill
- Minister: David Cameron; Theresa May; Boris Johnson
- Preceded by: Bob Kerslake
- Succeeded by: Alex Chisholm

Chief Executive of the Major Projects Authority
- In office February 2014 – 13 October 2014
- Preceded by: Office established
- Succeeded by: David Blackall

Personal details
- Born: 1960 (age 65–66)
- Education: Imperial College London Stanford University
- Occupation: British businessperson and civil servant

Sir John Alexander Manzoni KCB (born 1960) is a British senior civil servant and business executive, who served as chief executive of the civil service and the Cabinet Office Permanent Secretary from 2014 to 2020.

== Early life and education ==
Manzoni studied civil engineering as an undergraduate and obtained a master's degree in petroleum engineering at Imperial College London. He later studied for a Master's degree in management as a Sloan Fellow at Stanford University in 1994. He also has a Master of Business Administration degree.

== Business career ==
Manzoni started to work for the oil and gas company BP in 1983. In 2000, he was a group vice president at the company. He was chief executive for refining and marketing at BP at the time of the Texas City refinery explosion in 2005, in which 15 people were killed and 170 injured. An internal BP investigation cleared him of "serious neglect or intentional misconduct" but said he should have taken more steps to consider and mitigate the risks long before the disaster occurred, and criticised several aspects of his conduct. Costs of repairs and deferred production at Texas City amounted to over $1 billion. BP pled guilty to federal environmental crimes, for which it paid $50 million. The company also paid at least around $2.1 billion in civil settlements. Additionally, BP paid $84.6 million and $27 million in fines to the federal government on OSHA's and the EPA's request, respectively, and a $50 million fine to the government of Texas for environmental violations. The disaster is the world's most expensive refinery accident.

In 2007, a month after the BP report was made public, Manzoni left BP to become the president and chief executive officer of Talisman Energy, an oil and gas exploration and production company. He replaced James Buckee, who had headed the company for 14 years. In his last year working at BP, Manzoni earned a salary of £758,000. During his time at Talisman the company focused on shale gas, selling a non-controlling stake in its North Sea business to Sinopec in July 2012. Manzoni resigned from Talisman and was replaced by Hal Kvisle in September 2012. In July 2015, the United States Environmental Protection Agency reported that it had fined Talisman Energy $62,457 for more than fifty health and safety violations at sites in Pennsylvania.

== Civil service career ==
In February 2014, Manzoni joined the British civil service as the chief executive of the Major Projects Authority, a role under the remit of the Cabinet Office. His former BP boss John Browne, who had also left BP in 2007 sat on Manzoni's appointment panel but did not chair it.

Whilst in this role, Manzoni also was a director for the brewing and beverage company SABMiller, chair of the energy company Leyshon Energy and an adviser to the venture capital company Adamant Ventures.

On 13 October 2014, Manzoni was appointed as the first chief executive of the civil service, after the position was split out from that of the Head of the Home Civil Service when Bob Kerslake retired. A number of business figures who had been approached for the role were reported to have turned it down, with one commenting that the job was "un-doable", and the Financial Times reported that the government had drawn up a "plan B" to appoint Manzoni. His appointment was criticised by the Green Party Member of Parliament (MP) Caroline Lucas.

As chief executive of the civil service, Manzoni resigned from his positions at Leyshon Energy and Adamant Ventures but continued as a director for SABMiller, for which he was criticised by MPs including Sarah Wollaston, then a Conservative MP serving as chair of the health select committee, as a conflict of interest given SABMiller's opposition to minimum alcohol pricing. An open letter from medical professionals and charities argued that the director role was incompatible with his civil service role. The Cabinet Office said that it was satisfied that there was no conflict of interest, before later announcing that Manzoni would resign from his position as director in 2015.

In 2015, Manzoni told a conference of the FDA trade union that civil service roles did not need as much pay as they were more interesting than roles in the private sector. In the role, he advocated a "functional" model of government aimed at developing skills across different government departments.

Manzoni's position of chief executive was initially a five-year appointment, but it was extended until April 2020 for continuity with changes in government following the 2019 United Kingdom general election. He was succeeded by Alex Chisholm, who took the title of chief operating officer of the Civil Service.

== Later career ==
Manzoni was appointed to join the board of the alcohol company Diageo in 2020, with his term starting in October.

Manzoni was appointed chair-designate for the newly renationalised Atomic Weapons Establishment in November 2020, and took up the post in July 2021.

== Honours ==
Manzoni was appointed Knight Commander of the Order of the Bath (KCB) in the 2020 New Year Honours for public service.

Business positions
Preceded by James Buckee	Chief Executive Officer, Talisman Energy; 2007 to 2012	Succeeded by Hal Kvisle
Government offices
New title	Chief Executive, Major Projects Authority; February to October 2014	Succeeded by David Blackall
Preceded by Bob Kerslake as Head of the Home Civil Service	Chief Executive of the Civil Service; 2014 to 2020	Incumbent
Preceded by Richard Heaton	Permanent Secretary of the Cabinet Office; 2015 to 2020	Incumbent
