= Holiday Highlights =

1940 film by Fred Avery

- Title card
- Directed by: Fred Avery
- Story by: Dave Monahan
- Produced by: Leon Schlesinger
- Starring: Mel Blanc
- Music by: Carl W. Stalling
- Animation by: Charles McKimson
- Color process: Technicolor
- Production company: Leon Schlesinger Productions
- Distributed by: Warner Bros. Pictures
- Release date: October 12, 1940
- Running time: 7 min
- Country: United States
- Language: English

Holiday Highlights is a 1940 American animated comedy short film directed by Fred Avery. It was released on October 12, 1940. It is part of the Merrie Melodies series.

== Plot ==
The film depicts various unrelated visual gags involving holidays.

After New Year's Eve, the New Year is depicted as an infant who when spurred yells in celebration of his birth with Bugs Bunny's voice. On Valentine's Day, two children romance each other overtly much to each other's discomfort. Presidents' Day is depicted as a humorous retelling of young George Washington cutting his father's cherry tree.

On Arbor Day, a man is instructed to needlessly move his tree to the same position by his dog. On Easter, the Easter Bunny spots a fox while hiding Easter eggs, dashing off and giving the fox the basket when it asks to have one. On April Fools' Day, a blank screen is shown as indication of the narrator's trickery, which is interrupted by an intertitle from the "management" that reads "Tain't Funny McGee". On Mother's Day, a rotoscoped mother nonchalantly meets her son for the first time in 22 years; the son has become decrepit over the years. On June 1, a newly graduated student is forced to get food at a bread line, where his professor is also queuing.

On Halloween, a witch advertises a dollar store while flying on her broom. On Thanksgiving (November 21 for Democrats and November 28 for Republicans), a turkey leads the prayer for a family, only to realize that he is to be eaten and escapes. On Christmas, Santa Claus hosts an ice cream truck on his sleigh. On New Year, floats of Santa Barbara, The Lone Stranger and California redwood trees are described to be respectively popular with adults, children and dogs.
