= Osmotherly Rules =

Set of guidelines for providing evidence to British parliamentary select committees

The Osmotherly Rules, named for their author, a civil servant in the Machinery of Government Division of the British Cabinet Office named E. B. C. Osmotherly, are a set of internal guidelines specifying how government departments should provide evidence to parliamentary select committees. Covering procedures for both the House of Lords and the House of Commons, it has "no formal Parliamentary standing or approval, nor does it claim to have."

== History ==
Although they were first formally issued in May 1980, a similar document had been circulating throughout the 1970s. They were "prepared entirely for use within Government" and had no official status in Parliament. An early edition of the rules was caught up in the Westland affair, a political scandal in which the ministers were worried that officials being questioned by committees about individual conduct could be harmful; they were criticised as "unduly restrictive".

The current edition dates from October 2014, and was issued by Francis Maude as the Minister for the Cabinet Office under the name of Giving Evidence to Select Committees: guidance for civil servants.

== Content ==
As to an overarching principle the rules state that civil servants ("officials") are not directly accountable to Parliament; rather, Secretaries of State, Ministers of State, Parliamentary Under-Secretaries of State and Parliamentary Private Secretaries (as the elected/appointed agents of the Crown) are so accountable to Parliament. Their civil servants, essentially carrying out actions under ministerial powers and authority, are merely responsible to them, and thus cannot be summoned by Select Committees, as they are protected by the same rule that prevents Members of Parliament being summoned. In general, if there is a dispute about the attendance of an official, the relevant minister should attend instead as a matter of courtesy.

Other issues the rules provide guidance on include:

- the limitations of Select Committees' powers to "send for persons, papers and records"
- the procedures on committees summoning retired officials
- parliamentary privilege
- the point at which the cost of supplying information is considered excessive
- the rules of sub judice (current, likely and pending litigation privilege)
- withholding and redacting evidence on the grounds of national security and public interest.

The tests used in the most recent edition are based on those used by civil servants when considering the extent to which a freedom of information request should be acceded to.

== See also ==
- British Civil Service
- Cabinet Secretary
- Permanent Secretary
