= Cat Little =

British civil servant

Cat Little CB
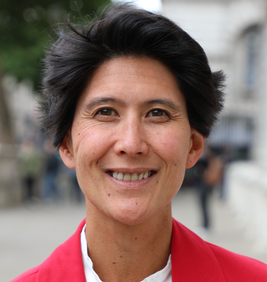

Cabinet Office Permanent Secretary and Chief Operating Officer of the Civil Service
- Incumbent
- Assumed office 2 April 2024
- Cabinet Secretary: Simon Case; Chris Wormald; Antonia Romeo
- Preceded by: Sir Alex Chisholm

Personal details
- Born: 19 May 1980 (age 46)
- Education: University of Birmingham
- Website: gov.uk/government/people/cat-little

Catherine Joanna "Cat" Little CB (born 19 May 1980) is a British civil servant, who replaced Sir Alex Chisholm as Cabinet Office Permanent Secretary and the chief operating officer of the United Kingdom's Civil Service in April 2024. Prior to this she was the Second Permanent Secretary at HM Treasury from October 2022, and was acting Permanent Secretary between September and October 2022.

== Early life and education ==
Little was born on 19 May 1980 in Amersham, Buckinghamshire, England. She was educated at Beaconsfield High School, an all-girls grammar school in Beaconsfield, Buckinghamshire. She studied at the University of Birmingham, graduating with a Bachelor of Arts (BA) degree in 2002. She was the president of the Guild of Students (i.e. the student union) for the 2001/02 academic year.

== Career ==
After graduating from university, she worked for PricewaterhouseCoopers, rising from associate to senior manager between 2003 and 2013. In 2013, she joined the civil service. She worked in the Legal Aid Agency, Ministry of Justice and Ministry of Defence. She moved to HM Treasury in 2020 as Director General for public spending. She was acting permanent secretary to the Treasury in September 2022, and appointed second permanent secretary in October 2022.

In April 2024, she became Cabinet Office Permanent Secretary and the chief operating officer of the United Kingdom's Civil Service, in succession to Sir Alex Chisholm.

On 23 April 2026, Little appeared before the House of Commons, Foreign Affairs Select Committee where she rejected an account given by Sir Olly Robbins on 21 April 2026 that it was her department that had suggested Peter Mandelson might not have required developed security vetting to take up his 2025 Washington appointment as British Ambassador to the United States.

== Personal life ==
Little lives in the Kent North Downs, enjoys running, cycling and walking the dog with her wife Ruth, whom she married in 2014.

== Honours ==
Little was appointed Companion of the Order of the Bath (CB) in the 2023 New Year Honours for public service.

Government offices
Preceded by Sir Charles Roxburgh	Second Permanent Secretary of HM Treasury; 2022–2024; With: Beth Russell	Succeeded by Beth Russell
Preceded by Alex Chisholm	Cabinet Office Permanent Secretary; 2 April 2024–	Incumbent
Preceded by Alex Chisholm	Chief Operating Officer of the Civil Service; 2 April 2024–	Incumbent
