= Martin Donnelly (civil servant) =

British civil servant and businessman

Sir Martin Donnelly KCB CMG
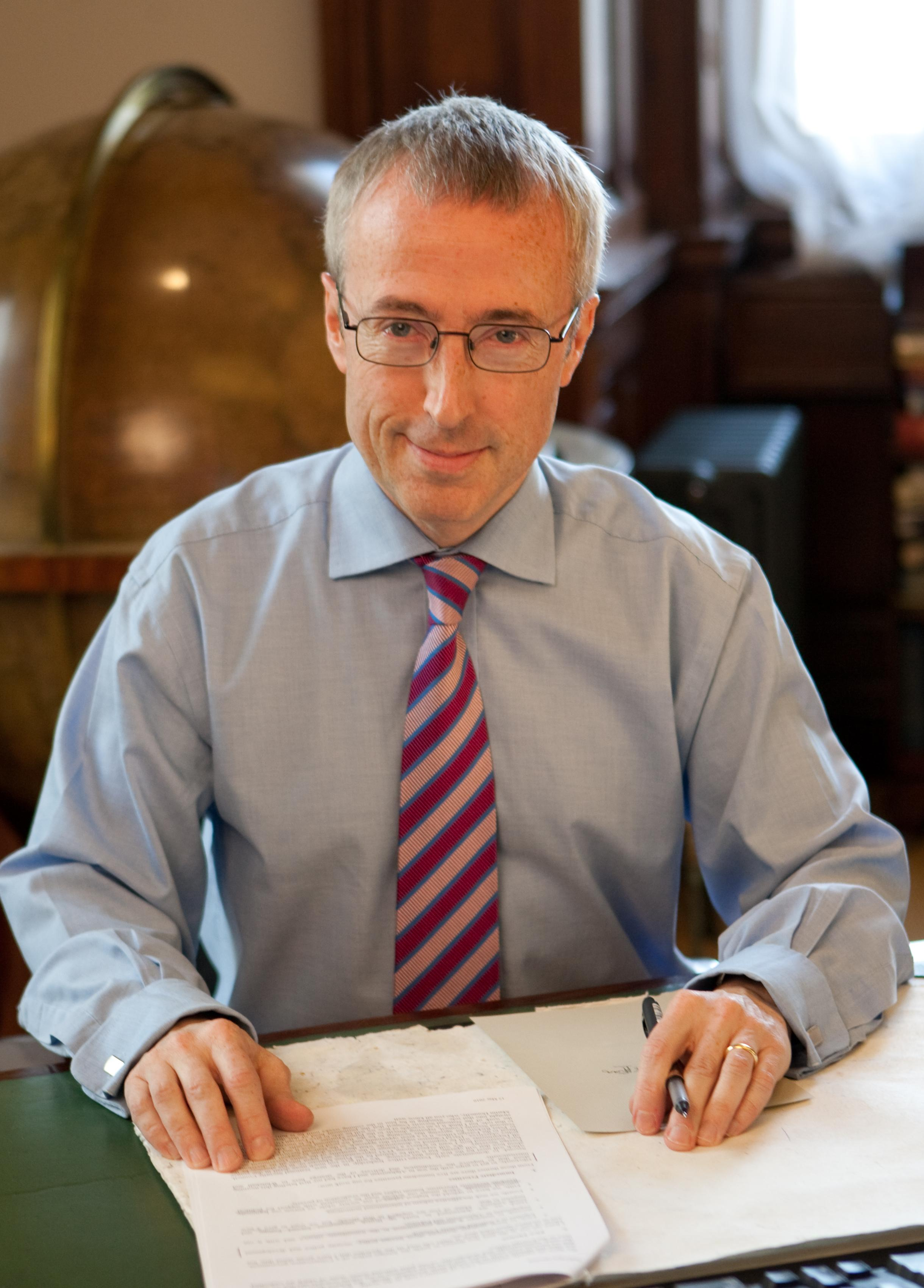

Permanent Secretary for the Department for International Trade
- In office 2016–2017
- Prime Minister: Theresa May
- Minister: Liam Fox
- Preceded by: Position Established
- Succeeded by: Antonia Romeo

Personal details
- Born: Martin Eugene Donnelly; 4 June 1958 (age 68) Newbury, Berkshire, England
- Spouse: Carol Jean Heald (m. 1985; died 1996) Lyndal Roper
- Children: 3

Sir Martin Eugene Donnelly, KCB, CMG (born 4 June 1958) is a British former civil servant. His roles included permanent secretary of the Department for Business, Innovation and Skills (2010–2016), and of the Department for International Trade (2016–2017).

== Career ==
Donnelly joined the Treasury in 1980. In 1988 he was Private Secretary to the Secretary of State for Northern Ireland, and from 1989 in Brussels working in the Cabinet of Leon Brittan before returning to London in 1993. In 1995 he went on secondment to the French Ministry of Finance, returning to the Treasury in 1996. From 1998 to 2003 he worked in the Cabinet Office as Deputy Head of the European Secretariat and then moved to the Immigration and Nationality Directorate of the Home Office for a year.

In 2004, Donnelly was promoted to be Director-General for Economics (later, for Europe and Globalisation) in the Foreign and Commonwealth Office. In 2008–2009 he went on secondment to UK telecoms regulator Ofcom, returning to the Cabinet Office to lead the Smarter Government white paper.

In 2010, he was briefly made acting head of the FCO after Sir Peter Ricketts became the UK's first National Security Advisor. After a few months, he was appointed as permanent secretary in charge of the wide-ranging Department for Business, Innovation and Skills (BIS), and held that role until the department was disbanded in July 2016 at the start of the first May ministry. He transferred to the permanent secretary role at the newly created Department for International Trade, until he left the civil service in March 2017.

As of September 2015, Donnelly was paid a salary of between £180,000 and £184,999, making him one of the 328 most highly paid people in the British public sector at that time.

Donnelly led work to improve inclusion and gender balance across the senior civil service leadership in a range of departments. While permanent secretary of BIS he achieved gender balance across the senior team of 160 people, encouraging part-time working and job shares, by developing a new culture to encourage supportive team working. BIS was the first major department to achieve gender parity in its senior leadership.

After leaving the civil service, in November 2017 he became a part-time senior adviser with Teneo, which describes itself as "the global CEO advisory firm", providing advice to senior executives of large companies. He left Teneo in spring 2019. Between 2017 and 2019, Donnelly was a visiting fellow at Hertford College, Oxford.

In June 2019, Donelly was appointed president of Boeing Europe and managing director of Boeing UK and Ireland. He retired from Boeing in October 2022. He is a non executive director of the National Audit Office.

== Public persona after leaving the Civil Service ==
In February 2018, speaking on Radio 4's Today programme, he warned that Brexit would be "giving up a three-course meal… for the promise of a packet of crisps in the future."

== Personal life ==
Donnelly studied Philosophy, Politics and Economics at Oxford University, and then international economics at the College of Europe in Bruges. While at the Treasury, he had a secondment at the École nationale d'administration, Paris.

== Honours ==
Donnelly was appointed Companion of the Order of St Michael and St George (CMG) in the 2002 Birthday Honours and Knight Commander of the Order of the Bath (KCB) in the 2016 Birthday Honours.

Government offices
Preceded by Simon Fraser	Permanent Secretary of the Department for Business, Innovation and Skills; 2010–2016	Succeeded by himself as Permanent Secretary, Department for Business, Energy and Industrial Strategy
Preceded by himself as Permanent Secretary, Department for Business, Innovation and Skills	Permanent Secretary of the Department for Business, Energy and Industrial Strategy; 2016; With: Alex Chisholm	Succeeded by Alex Chisholm
Preceded by Alex Chisholm as Permanent Secretary, Department for Energy and Climate Change	Permanent Secretary of the Department for Business, Energy and Industrial Strategy; 2016; With: Alex Chisholm	Succeeded by Alex Chisholm
Preceded by none	Permanent Secretary of the Department for International Trade; 2016–2017	Succeeded by Antonia Romeo
