= Osmotherley =

Osmotherley may refer to:

- Osmotherley, North Yorkshire, an English village and civil parish
- Osmotherley, Cumbria, an English civil parish

== See also ==
- Osmotherly Rules, a set of rules regarding how UK civil servants interact with Parliament
