= Gus O'Donnell =

British retired civil servant and economist (born 1952)

The Right Honourable The Lord O'Donnell KG GCB FAcSS
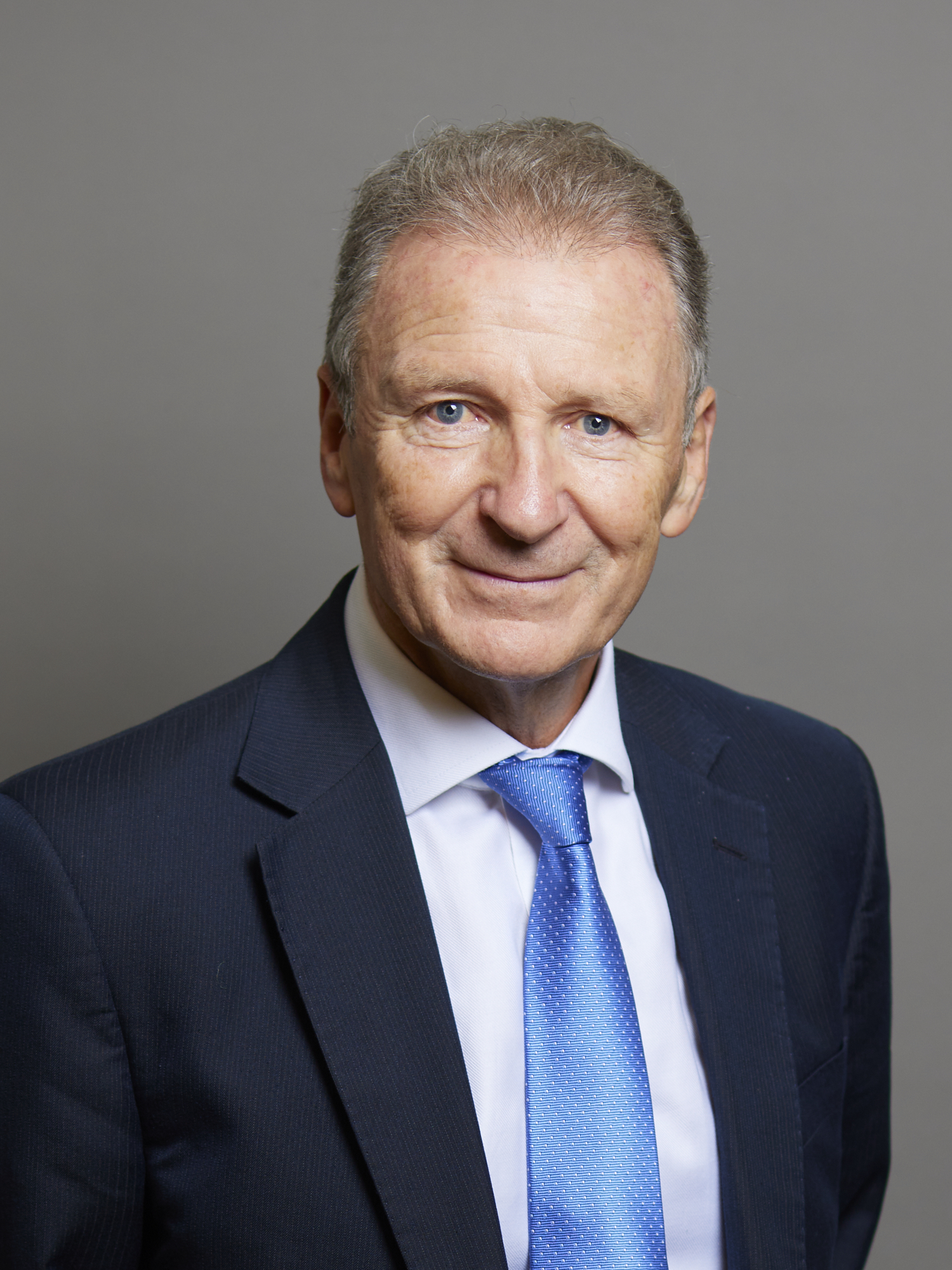
- Official portrait, 2021

Cabinet Secretary
- In office 1 August 2005 – 31 December 2011
- Prime Minister: Tony Blair; Gordon Brown; David Cameron
- Preceded by: Andrew Turnbull
- Succeeded by: Sir Jeremy Heywood

Head of the Home Civil Service
- In office 1 August 2005 – 31 December 2011
- Prime Minister: Tony Blair; Gordon Brown; David Cameron
- Preceded by: Andrew Turnbull
- Succeeded by: Sir Bob Kerslake

Cabinet Office Permanent Secretary
- In office 1 August 2005 – 31 December 2011
- Minister: John Hutton; Hilary Armstrong; Ed Miliband; Liam Byrne; Tessa Jowell; Francis Maude
- Preceded by: Andrew Turnbull
- Succeeded by: Ian Watmore

Permanent Secretary to the Treasury
- In office 8 July 2002 – 2 August 2005
- Chancellor: Gordon Brown
- Preceded by: Andrew Turnbull
- Succeeded by: Nicholas Macpherson

Downing Street Press Secretary
- In office 1990–1993
- Prime Minister: John Major
- Preceded by: Bernard Ingham
- Succeeded by: Christopher Meyer

Member of the House of Lords
- Lord Temporal
- Life peerage 10 January 2012

Personal details
- Born: 1 October 1952 (age 74) South London, United Kingdom
- Education: University of Warwick (BA); Nuffield College, Oxford (MPhil)

Augustine Thomas O'Donnell, Baron O'Donnell (born 1 October 1952) is a former British senior civil servant and economist, who between 2005 and 2011 (under three Prime Ministers) served as the Cabinet Secretary, the highest official in the British Civil Service.

O'Donnell announced after the 2010 General Election that he would step down within that Parliament and did so at the end of 2011. His post was then split into three positions: he was succeeded as Cabinet Secretary by Sir Jeremy Heywood, as Head of the Home Civil Service by Sir Bob Kerslake (in a part-time role), and as Permanent Secretary in the Cabinet Office by Ian Watmore. Whilst Cabinet Secretary, he was regularly referred to within the Civil Service, and subsequently in the popular press, as GOD; this was mainly because of his initials. In 2012, he joined Frontier Economics as a senior adviser.

== Background ==
O'Donnell was born and raised in south London. Educated at Salesian College, Battersea, he read Economics at the University of Warwick before taking his MPhil degree at Nuffield College, Oxford. He was a lecturer at the University of Glasgow in the Political Economy Department from 1975 until 1979, when he joined the Treasury as an economist.

In 1985, O'Donnell joined the British Embassy in Washington, serving as the First Secretary of the Economics division for four years. In 1989, he became press secretary for the Chancellor of the Exchequer before transferring next door to serve as press secretary to the prime minister from 1990 to 1994.

From 1997 to 1998, O'Donnell was the United Kingdom's executive director to both the International Monetary Fund and the World Bank, again in Washington, before returning to HM Treasury to serve as both director of Macroeconomic Policy and Prospects and also head of the Government Economics Service, with overall responsibility for the professional economists in Her Majesty's Government. A year later, he was appointed managing director of Macroeconomic Policy and International Finance, with responsibility for Fiscal Policy, International Development, and European Union Economic and Monetary Union.

== Cabinet Secretary and Head of the Civil Service ==
On 8 July 2002, O'Donnell took over from Sir Andrew Turnbull as Permanent Secretary of the Treasury following the appointment of Sir Andrew as Cabinet Secretary. On 15 June 2005, it was announced that O'Donnell would again replace Turnbull, this time as Cabinet Secretary, on the latter's imminent retirement. He took up office in August 2005.

O'Donnell is known for his "wondrous interpersonal gifts" and his informal style. He regularly visited Civil Service departments outside London "to meet civil servants at work".

During his time as Cabinet Secretary, his authority was seen as absolute, giving rise to the affectionate nickname "GOD" based on his initials as they appeared in Government papers.

The annual remuneration for this position was £235,000.

In his role as Cabinet Secretary, O'Donnell was responsible for overseeing the review of Christopher Meyer's controversial memoirs, DC Confidential, in November 2005. The previous month, he had told the Public Administration Select Committee that it was "wrong" for civil servants to publish personal memoirs.

On 10 August 2010, Channel 4 News reported that O'Donnell would leave his post before the end of the current Parliament.

In January 2011, it emerged that O'Donnell had decided not to publish correspondence sent between Tony Blair and George W. Bush prior to the 2003 invasion. The papers were, however, provided to the Iraq Inquiry itself. His reasoning is explained in several documents between him and Sir John Chilcot.

In November 2010, O'Donnell published a draft copy of the Cabinet manual. This document outlines the laws, rules and conventions that apply to the British executive.

On 11 October 2011, it was announced by Downing Street that O'Donnell was to retire at the end of the year. His successor was announced as the Downing Street Permanent Secretary Jeremy Heywood. However, the roles of Cabinet Secretary, Head of the Civil Service and Permanent Secretary at the Cabinet Office were split.

On 22 December 2011, O'Donnell said that the future of the Union is one of several "enormous challenges" facing the political establishment in the coming years. "Over the next few years there will be enormous challenges, such as whether to keep our kingdom united," he warned officials and politicians.

== Post-Cabinet Secretary ==
In addition to being the chair of Frontier Economics, O'Donnell is visiting professor to the London School of Economics and University College London.

He is a trustee of the Economist Group.

He is a strategic adviser to the chief executive of Toronto Dominion Bank, and a fellow of the Institute for Government, and was the chairman of the Commission on Wellbeing at the Legatum Institute.

In 2015, he was co-author of the report that launched the Global Apollo Programme, which calls for developed nations to commit to spending 0.02% of their GDP for 10 years, to fund co-ordinated research to make carbon-free baseload electricity less costly than electricity from coal by 2025.

=== Wellbeing movement ===
O'Donnell has been a leader in the wellbeing and happiness movements. He chaired the development group of founding partners setting up the What Works Centre for Wellbeing. He is a supporter of Action for Happiness, and has spoken at the University of Oxford Wellbeing Research Centre's Wellbeing Research & Policy Conference.

== Peerage ==
On 10 January 2012, O'Donnell was created a life peer as Baron O'Donnell, of Clapham in the London Borough of Wandsworth, and was introduced in the House of Lords, where he sits as a crossbencher, on 12 January 2012. In his first speech in the House of Lords, in June 2012, he warned that too many Treasury officials were leaving, that staff are underpaid, and that the Treasury may be struggling to address the problems caused by the ongoing global financial turmoil.

== Political views ==
O'Donnell supports a liberal immigration policy, saying in 2011 that "[w]hen I was at the Treasury I argued for the most open door possible to immigration ... I think it's my job to maximise global welfare not national welfare". He has repeated this view in a milder form in newspaper articles, and thinks that his views about immigration are in the interests of the average British person, notwithstanding some short-term losers.

In July 2017, he warned that "there was no way Brexit would happen smoothly."

== Personal interests ==
O'Donnell is a keen sportsman, having played football for the University of Warwick First XI and for Oxford, earning two Blues in 1973–1974 and 1974–1975. While Permanent Secretary at the Treasury he won a football medal at the annual Civil Service Sports Day—the first Permanent Secretary to do so. He has played for the Mandarins Cricket Club for many years, the third Cabinet Secretary to do so (the others being Sir Robin Butler and Sir Andrew Turnbull). He is a supporter of Manchester United.

He is a director of the All England Lawn Tennis Club (AELTC), which organises the Wimbledon Championships. In November 2025, he supported a change in the law that would make it easier for the AELTC to build on open space in the area.

In 2010, The Tablet named him as one of Britain's most influential Roman Catholics.

O'Donnell was formerly a governor of his alma mater, Salesian College, Battersea.

== Honours ==
O'Donnell has received several appointments to the Most Honourable Order of the Bath: he was appointed Companion (CB) in the 1994 New Year Honours, Knight Commander (KCB) in the 2005 Birthday Honours and Knight Grand Cross (GCB) in the 2011 Birthday Honours. The Parliamentary Public Administration Committee cited the example of at least one of O'Donnell's appointments (his knighthood) to the Order as automatic honours granted owing to his position and not for exceptional service, although it is not specified if all of his honours were granted solely due to his position or if some were due to exceptional service.

In 2014, O'Donnell was elected an honorary fellow of the British Academy. In 2016, he was elected a fellow of the Academy of Social Sciences (FAcSS).

On 23 April 2026, O'Donnell was appointed a Knight Companion of the Order of the Garter by King Charles III.

Government offices
Preceded by Bernard Ingham	Downing Street Press Secretary; 1990–1993	Succeeded by Christopher Meyer
Preceded by Andrew Turnbull	Permanent Secretary for the Treasury; 2002–2005	Succeeded by Nicholas Macpherson
Preceded by Andrew Turnbull	Cabinet Secretary; 2005–2011	Succeeded by Sir Jeremy Heywood
Preceded by Andrew Turnbull	Head of the Home Civil Service; 2005–2011	Succeeded by Sir Bob Kerslake
Preceded by Andrew Turnbull	Permanent Secretary for the Cabinet Office; 2005–2011	Succeeded by Ian Watmore
Orders of precedence in the United Kingdom
Preceded by The Lord Curry of Kirkharle	Gentlemen; Baron O'Donnell	Followed by The Lord Trees
