= Jo Farrar =

British civil servant

Jo Farrar CB OBE

Permanent Secretary of the Ministry of Justice; Clerk of the Crown in Chancery
- Incumbent
- Assumed office 1 July 2025
- Monarch: Charles III
- Prime Minister: Keir Starmer; Andy Burnham
- Minister: Shabana Mahmood; David Lammy; Alex Norris
- Preceded by: Dame Antonia Romeo

Dr. Josephine Maria "Jo" Farrar CB OBE is a British civil servant, currently serving since 1 July 2025 as the permanent secretary of the Ministry of Justice and Clerk of the Crown in Chancery.

== Career ==
Farrar's career has covered roles in local and central government, including as Chief Executive Officer at NHS Blood and Transplant, Second Permanent Secretary at the Ministry of Justice for 2021–2023, partially overlapping with being Chief Executive Officer of HM Prison and Probation Service for 2021–2022. She was Director General for Local Government and Public Services at MHCLG from 2016 to 2019, and from 2012 to 2016 as Chief Executive of Bath and North East Somerset Council. She succeeded Dame Antonia Romeo after Romeo transferred to the Home Office.

Farrer was appointed OBE in the 2016 New Year Honours, and as CB in the 2021 New Year Honours.
