= Danny Lopez (businessman) =

British business executive (born 1974)

Danny Lopez MBE

Her Majesty's Consul-General in New York
- In office July 2011 – July 2016
- Prime Minister: David Cameron

Personal details
- Born: 1974 (age 51–52)
- Spouse: Susan Grieve (m. 2012)
- Children: 3
- Education: Marists School, Zaragoza, Spain
- Alma mater: University of Essex

Danny Lopez MBE (born 1974) is a British and Spanish business executive and former diplomat, known for roles across government and technology. He is the CEO of cyber security firm Glasswall, the Chair of Aquis Stock Exchange, and served as the British Consul-General to New York from 2011 to 2016. He is the author of The Cyber Envoy, aimed at helping board chairs, non-executive directors and senior leaders govern cyber risk effectively without becoming technical specialists.

== Career ==
Danny started his career at Barclays in 1996 and over the next ten years he held a number of international banking roles in London, Miami, New York and Mumbai.

In 2006, Danny joined the executive team at UK Trade & Investment, the UK government's foreign commercial arm. From 2009 to 2011, he worked for Boris Johnson, then Mayor of London, and established the UK capital's promotional agency London & Partners, becoming its inaugural CEO.

In 2011, the role of British Consul-General to New York was opened up to applicants outside the Foreign and Commonwealth Office, and Danny became the youngest-ever holder of the position. As the senior British diplomat to New York for five years, he was responsible for promoting the UK's economic profile, foreign policy and national security priorities.

In 2016, Danny left his diplomatic position, returned to the private sector, and became the COO at technology company Blippar. In 2017 he joined the board of Innovate Finance, the industry body that champions the UK's global fintech community, and served on its board until 2025.

In 2019, Danny was appointed CEO of cyber security firm Glasswall, which in 2025, under his leadership, announced a strategic investment from PSG Equity. In 2021 he joined the board of Aquis Stock Exchange and took over the role of Chair in 2026.

Danny speaks regularly on platforms across the world on cyber security, AI, geopolitics and the intersection of market disrupting technologies and government policy. In 2026, Danny published The Cyber Envoy, a boardroom playbook for turning cyber risk into confident decision-making.

== Honours and awards ==
- Freedom of the City of London at a ceremony held at Guildhall, the ceremonial and administrative centre of the City of London, in May 2023.
- Member of the Order of the British Empire (MBE) for services to trade promotion and to the City of London, in June 2025.

== Personal life ==
Born in England to José Antonio and Elizabeth, and brought up in Spain, Danny was educated at the Marists School of Zaragoza. Fluent in both English and Spanish, he holds a BA degree in economics and an MA degree in international economics and finance from the University of Essex. In 2012 he married his Australian fiancée, Susan Grieve. They have three children: Lucy, Stella and Alex.

Diplomatic posts
Preceded by Sir Alan Collins	Her Majesty's Consul-General in New York, Foreign & Commonwealth Office; 2011–July 2016	Succeeded by Antonia Romeo as HM Consul-General NYC and Director-General, Economic and Commercial Affairs, USA
Preceded by Sir Alan Collins	Director-General, Economic and Commercial Affairs USA, UK Trade & Investment; 2011–July 2016	Succeeded by Antonia Romeo as HM Consul-General NYC and Director-General, Economic and Commercial Affairs, USA
