= Breadline =

Breadline may refer to:

- "Breadline", a song by Megadeth
- Breadline Africa, a poverty relief organisation
- A term for the poverty threshold, the minimum level of income deemed adequate in a country
- Soup kitchen
- Rationing
