= Cabinet Office Permanent Secretary =

Second in charge of a UK government department

The Cabinet Office Permanent Secretary is the second-most senior civil servant of the Cabinet Office. It was conventionally joined with the positions of Cabinet Secretary and Head of the Civil Service. This triple role was disbanded in January 2012 after Gus O'Donnell retired.

Due to the Cabinet Office having expanded and taken on new responsibilities since the 2010 election, including cutting costs and driving efficiency across government, it is led by a dedicated Permanent Secretary.

The current Permanent Secretary of the Cabinet Office is Cat Little.

== List of permanent secretaries ==
- Ian Watmore (January – June 2012)
- Sir Richard Heaton (August 2012 – August 2015)
- Sir John Manzoni (August 2015 – April 2020) – Also Chief Executive of the Civil Service
- Sir Alex Chisholm (April 2020 – April 2024) – Also Chief Operating Officer for the Civil Service
- Cat Little (April 2024 – present) – Also Chief Operating Officer for the Civil Service

== See also ==
- Number 10 Downing Street
- Civil Service
