= Civil Service (United Kingdom) =

Permanent bureaucracy of the British state

The Civil Service

Organisation overview
- Ministers responsible: Andy Burnham, Prime Minister and Minister for the Civil Service; Louise Haigh, First Secretary of State and Chancellor of the Duchy of Lancaster
- Organisation executives: Dame Antonia Romeo, Cabinet Secretary and Head of the Civil Service; Cat Little, Cabinet Office Permanent Secretary and Chief Operating Officer of the Civil Service; Harriet Aldridge, Chief Operating Officer for the Cabinet Office; Michael Ellam, Second Permanent Secretary in the Cabinet Office, European Union and International Economic Affairs; Ellen Atkinson, Director General, Propriety and Constitution Group
- Website: gov.uk/civil-service

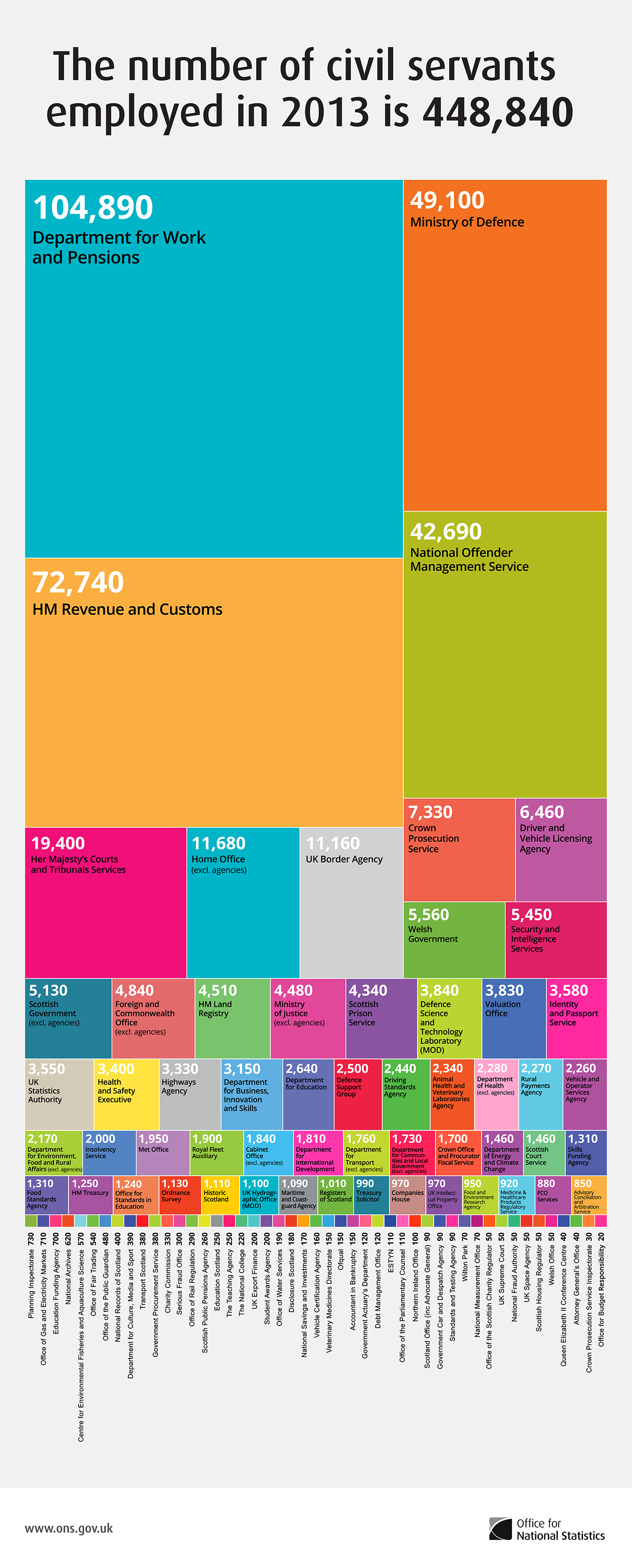

In the United Kingdom, the Civil Service is the permanent bureaucracy or secretariat of Crown employees which supports the UK Government, as well as the Scottish Government and Welsh Government. It is led by a cabinet of ministers of the UK Government chosen by the prime minister.

As in other states that employ the Westminster political system, the Civil Service – often known by the metonym of Whitehall – forms an inseparable part of the British government. The executive decisions of government ministers are implemented by the Civil Service. Civil servants are employees of the Crown and not of the British parliament. Civil servants also have some traditional and statutory responsibilities which to some extent protect them from being used for the political advantage of the party in power. Senior civil servants may be called to account to Parliament.

In general use, the term civil servant in the United Kingdom does not include all public sector employees. Although there is no fixed legal definition, the term is usually defined as a "servant of the Crown working in a civil capacity who is not the holder of a political (or judicial) office; the holder of certain other offices in respect of whose tenure of office special provision has been made; [or] a servant of the Crown in a personal capacity paid from the Civil List". As such, the civil service does not include government ministers (who are politically appointed); members of the British Armed Forces; police officers; officers of local government authorities; employees of some non-departmental public bodies; officers or staff of either of the Houses of Parliament; employees of the National Health Service (NHS); or staff of the Royal Household. As of the end of March 2021 there were 484,880 civil servants in the Civil Service, an increase of 6.23 per cent on the previous year.

== History ==
=== Establishment ===
the incorruptible spinal column of England

— John Gunther, 1940

The Offices of State grew in England, and later the United Kingdom centred around the street Whitehall, hence the metonym. Initially, they were little more than secretariats for their leaders, who held positions at court. They were chosen by the king on the advice of a patron, and typically replaced when their patron lost influence. In the 18th century, in response to the growth of the British Empire and economic changes, institutions such as the Office of Works and the Navy Board grew large. Each had its own system and staff were appointed by purchase or patronage. By the 19th century, it became increasingly clear that these arrangements were not working.

Under Charles Grant, the East India Company established the East India Company College at Haileybury near London, to train administrators, in 1806. The college was established on recommendation of officials in China who had seen the imperial examination system. In government, a civil service, replacing patronage with examination, similar to the Chinese system, was advocated a number of times over the next several decades.

William Ewart Gladstone, in 1850, an opposition member, sought a more efficient system based on expertise rather than favouritism. The East India Company provided a model for Stafford Northcote, private Secretary to Gladstone who, with Charles Trevelyan, drafted the key report in 1854. The Northcote–Trevelyan Report recommended a permanent, unified, politically neutral civil service, with appointments made on merit, and a clear division between staff responsible for routine ("mechanical") and those engaged in policy formulation and implementation ("administrative") work. The report was not implemented, but it came as the bureaucratic chaos in the Crimean War demonstrated that the military was as backward as the civil service. A Civil Service Commission was set up in 1855 to oversee open recruitment and end patronage as Parliament passed an Act "to relieve the East India Company from the obligation to maintain the College at Haileybury". Prime Minister Gladstone took the decisive step in 1870 with his Order in Council to implement the Northcote-Trevelyan proposals. This system was broadly endorsed by commissions chaired by Playfair (1874), Ridley (1886), MacDonnell (1914), Tomlin (1931) and Priestley (1955).

The Northcote–Trevelyan model remained essentially stable for a hundred years. This was attributed to its success in removing corruption, delivering public services, even under stress of war, and responding effectively to political change. Patrick Diamond argues:

The Northcote-Trevelyan model was characterised by a hierarchical mode of Weberian bureaucracy; neutral, permanent and anonymous officials motivated by the public interest; and a willingness to administer policies ultimately determined by ministers. This bequeathed a set of theories, institutions and practices to subsequent generations of administrators in the central state.

The Irish Civil Service was separate from the British Civil Service. Whilst the Acts of Union 1800 abolished the Parliament of Ireland, the Lord Lieutenant of Ireland was retained in formal charge of the Irish executive based at Dublin Castle. The Irish Office in Whitehall liaised with Dublin Castle. Some British departments' area of operation extended to Ireland, while in other fields the Dublin department was separate from the Whitehall equivalent.

=== Lord Fulton's committee report ===
Following the Second World War demands for change grew again. There was a concern (illustrated in C. P. Snow's Strangers and Brothers series of novels) that technical and scientific expertise was mushrooming, to a point at which the "good all-rounder" culture of the administrative civil servant with a classics or other arts degree could no longer properly engage with it: as late as 1963, for example, the Treasury had just 19 trained economists. The times were, moreover, ones of keen respect for technocracy, with the mass mobilisation of war having worked effectively, and the French National Plan apparently delivering economic success. And there was also a feeling which would not go away, following the war and the radical social reforms of the 1945 Labour government, that the so-called "mandarins" of the higher civil service were too remote from the people. Indeed, between 1948 and 1963 only three per cent of the recruits to the administrative class came from the working classes, and in 1966 more than half of the administrators at undersecretary level and above had been privately educated.

Lord Fulton's committee reported in 1968. He found that administrators were not professional enough, and in particular lacked management skills; that the position of technical and scientific experts needed to be rationalised and enhanced; and that the service was indeed too remote. His 158 recommendations included the introduction of a unified grading system for all categories of staff, a Civil Service College and a central policy planning unit. He also said that control of the service should be taken from the Treasury, and given to a new department, and that the "fast stream" recruitment process for accessing the upper echelons should be made more flexible, to encourage candidates from less privileged backgrounds. The new department was set up by Prime Minister Harold Wilson's Labour Government in 1968 and named the Civil Service Department, known as CSD. Wilson himself took on the role of Minister for the Civil Service (which has continued to be a portfolio of the Prime Minister), while the first Minister in Charge of the Civil Service Department was Cabinet Minister Lord Shackleton, also Leader of the House of Lords and Lord Privy Seal. The first Permanent Secretary was Sir William Armstrong, who moved over from his post as Permanent Secretary at the Treasury. After the 1970 General Election, new Conservative Prime Minister Ted Heath appointed Lord Jellicoe in Lord Shackleton's place.

Into Heath's Downing Street came the Central Policy Review Staff (CPRS), and they were in particular given charge of a series of Programme Analysis and Review (PAR) studies of policy efficiency and effectiveness.

But, whether through lack of political will, or through passive resistance by a mandarinate which the report had suggested were "amateurs", Fulton failed. The Civil Service College equipped generalists with additional skills, but did not turn them into qualified professionals as ENA did in France. Recruits to the fast stream self-selected, with the universities of Oxford and Cambridge still producing a large majority of successful English candidates, since the system continued to favour the tutorial system at Oxbridge while to an extent the Scottish Ancient universities educated a good proportion of recruits from north of the border. The younger mandarins found excuses to avoid managerial jobs in favour of the more prestigious postings. The generalists remained on top, and the specialists on tap.

=== Margaret Thatcher's government ===
Margaret Thatcher came to office in 1979 believing in free markets as a better social system in many areas than the state: government should be small but active. Many of her ministers were suspicious of the civil service, in light of public choice research that suggested public servants (as well as elected officials themselves) tend to act in ways that seek to increase their own power and budgets.

She immediately set about reducing the size of the civil service, cutting numbers from 732,000 to 594,000 over her first seven years in office. Derek Rayner, the former chief executive of Marks & Spencer, was appointed as an efficiency expert with the Prime Minister's personal backing; he identified numerous problems with the Civil Service, arguing that only three billion of the eight billion pounds a year spent at that time by the Civil Service consisted of essential services, and that the "mandarins" (senior civil servants) needed to focus on efficiency and management rather than on policy advice. In late 1981 the Prime Minister announced the abolition of the Civil Service Department, transferring power over the Civil Service to the Prime Minister's Office and Cabinet Office. The Priestley Commission principle of pay comparability with the private sector was abandoned in February 1982.

Meanwhile, Michael Heseltine was introducing a comprehensive system of corporate and business planning (known as MINIS) first in the Department of the Environment and then in the Ministry of Defence. This led to the Financial Management Initiative, launched in September 1982 (Efficiency and Effectiveness in the Civil Service (Cmnd 8616)) as an umbrella for the efficiency scrutiny programme and with a wider focus on corporate planning, efficiency and objective-setting. Progress initially was sluggish, but in due course MINIS-style business planning became standard, and delegated budgets were introduced, so that individual managers were held much more accountable for meeting objectives, and for the first time for the resources they used to do so. Performance-related pay began in December 1984, was built on thereafter, and continues to this day, though the sums involved have always been small compared to the private sector, and the effectiveness of PRP as a genuine motivator has often been questioned.

In February 1988 Robin Ibbs, who had been recruited from ICI in July 1983 to run the Efficiency Unit (now in No. 10), published his report Improving Management in Government: The Next Steps. This envisaged a new approach to delivery featuring clear targets and personal responsibility. Without any statutory change, the managerial functions of Ministries would be hived off into Executive Agencies, with clear Framework Documents setting out their objectives, and whose chief executives would be made accountable directly (in some cases to Parliament) for performance. Agencies were to, as far as possible, take a commercial approach to their tasks. However, the Government conceded that agency staff would remain civil servants, which diluted the radicalism of the reform. The approach seems somewhat similar to the Swedish model, though no influence from Sweden has ever been acknowledged.

The Next Steps Initiative took some years to get off the ground, and progress was patchy. Significant change was achieved, although agencies never really achieved the level of autonomy envisaged at the start. By 5 April 1993, 89 agencies had been established, and contained over 260,000 civil servants, some 49 per cent of the total.

The focus on smaller, more accountable, units revived the keenness of Ministerial interest in the perceived efficiencies of the private sector. Already in the late 1980s, some common services once set up to capture economies of scale, such as the Property Services Agency and the Crown Suppliers, were being dismantled or sold off. Next, shortly after Thatcher left office, in July 1991, a new programme of market-testing of central government services began, with the White Paper Competing for Quality (Cm 1730). Five-yearly or three-yearly policy and finance reviews of all agencies and other public bodies were instituted, where the first question to be answered (the "prior options exercise") was why the function should not be abolished or privatised. In November 1991 the private finance initiative was launched, and by November 1994 the chancellor of the exchequer had referred to it as 'the funding mechanism of choice for most public sector projects'. In 1995 the decision was taken to privatise the Chessington Computer Centre, HMSO, the Occupational Health & Safety Agency and Recruitment & Assessment Services.

=== The Citizen's Charter ===
It was believed with the Thatcher reforms that efficiency was improving. But there was still a perception of carelessness and lack of responsiveness in the quality of public services. The government of John Major sought to tackle this with a Citizen's Charter programme. This sought to empower the service user, by setting out rights to standards in each service area, and arrangements for compensation when these were not met. An Office of Public Service and Science was set up in 1992, to see that the Charter policy was implemented across government.

By 1998, 42 Charters had been published, and they included services provided by public service industries such as the health service and the railways, as well as by the civil service. The programme was also expanded to apply to other organisations such as local government or housing associations, through a scheme of "Chartermark" awards. The programme was greeted with some derision, and it is true that the compensation sometimes hardly seemed worth the effort of claiming, and that the service standards were rarely set with much consumer input. But the initiative did have a significant effect in changing cultures, and paradoxically the spin-off Chartermark initiative may have had more impact on local organisations uncertain about what standards to aim for, than the parent Citizen's Charter programme itself.

== Governance ==
=== Minister for the Civil Service ===
The position of Minister for the Civil Service is not part of the Civil Service as it is a political position which has always been held by the prime minister of the United Kingdom.

=== Head of the Civil Service ===
The highest ranking civil servant is the Cabinet Secretary. A subsidiary title that was also held by the incumbent is Head of the Civil Service (previously Head of the Home Civil Service), who until recently was also the Permanent Secretary of the Cabinet Office. However, following the Coalition Government of David Cameron the three posts were split from the single holder. The last person to hold all three positions together was Gus O'Donnell, Cabinet Secretary, Head of the Home Civil Service and Cabinet Office Permanent Secretary, August 2005 – December 2011. The postholder is responsible for ensuring that the Civil Service is equipped with the skills and capability to meet the everyday challenges it faces and that civil servants work in a fair and decent environment. The postholder also chairs the Permanent Secretary Management Group and the Civil Service Steering Board which are the main governing bodies of the Civil Service.

It was announced on 11 October 2011 that, following O'Donnell's retirement at the end of 2011, the role of Head of the Home Civil Service would be split from the post of Cabinet Secretary; there would additionally be a new, separate, Permanent Secretary to lead the Cabinet Office. After O'Donnell's retirement, Jeremy Heywood replaced him as Cabinet Secretary – serving until 24 October 2018 when he retired on health grounds; Ian Watmore as Cabinet Office Permanent Secretary; and lastly, Bob Kerslake as Head of the Civil Service. In July 2014 it was announced that Kerslake would step down and Heywood would take the title of Head of the HCS while John Manzoni would be Chief Executive of the Civil Service. From 24 October 2018 to 4 November 2018, the office of Head of the Civil Service was vacant, as Heywood resigned on health grounds. Following Heywood's death, Mark Sedwill was given the additional Civil Service portfolio. Simon Case succeeded Mark Sedwill as Cabinet Secretary and Head of the Home Civil Service in 2020 until resigning in December 2024 on health grounds. Sir Chris Wormald took over the roles on 16 December 2024 until his departure on 12 February 2026. The current Cabinet Secretary is Dame Antonia Romeo, appointed on 19 February 2026.

Name	Dates	Notes
Sir Warren Fisher	1919–1939	Secretary to the Treasury
Sir Horace Wilson	1939–1942	Secretary to the Treasury
Sir Richard Hopkins	1942–1945	Secretary to the Treasury
Sir Edward Bridges	1945–1956	Secretary to the Treasury
Sir Norman Brook	1956–1962	Joint Secretary to the Treasury
Sir Laurence Helsby	1963–1968	Joint Secretary to the Treasury
Sir William Armstrong	1968–1974	Permanent Secretary, Civil Service Department
Sir Douglas Allen	1974–1978	Permanent Secretary, Civil Service Department
Sir Ian Bancroft	1978–1981	Permanent Secretary, Civil Service Department
Sir Douglas Wass	1981–1983	Secretary to the Treasury
Sir Robert Armstrong	1981–1987	Secretary to the Cabinet
Sir Robin Butler	1988–1998	Secretary to the Cabinet
Sir Richard Wilson	1998–2002	Secretary to the Cabinet
Sir Andrew Turnbull	2002–2005	Secretary to the Cabinet
Sir Gus O'Donnell	2005–2011	Secretary to the Cabinet
Sir Bob Kerslake	2012–2014	Permanent Secretary, Department of Communities and Local Government
Sir Jeremy Heywood	2014–2018	Secretary to the Cabinet
Sir Mark Sedwill	2018–2020	Secretary to the Cabinet
Simon Case	2020–2024	Secretary to the Cabinet
Sir Chris Wormald	2024–2026	Secretary to the Cabinet
Dame Antonia Romeo	2026–present	Secretary to the Cabinet

=== Permanent Secretaries Management Group (PSMG) ===
The PSMG considers issues of strategic importance to the Civil Service as a whole, as well as providing corporate leadership where a single position is required across all government departments. It is chaired by the Head of the Civil Service and consists of all first permanent secretaries and other selected permanent secretaries and directors general. This includes the Head of the Northern Ireland Civil Service, and the Head of the Diplomatic Service.

=== Civil Service Steering Board (CSSB) ===
The CSSB was established in 2007 and meets monthly. Its role is to enhance the performance and reputation of the Civil Service by focusing on specific areas delegated to it by PSMG. The CSSB is chaired by the Head of the Civil Service.

=== Civil Service Commissioners ===
The Civil Service Commissioners are not civil servants and are independent of Ministers, they are appointed directly by the Crown under Royal Prerogative and they report annually to the King.

Their main role is regarding the recruitment of civil servants. They have the responsibility to ensure that all civil servants are recruited on the "principle of selection on merit on the basis of fair and open competition." They maintain a recruitment code on the interpretation and application of that principle, and approve any exceptions to it. They audit recruitment policies and practices within the Civil Service and approve all appointments to the most senior levels of the Civil Service.

The Commissioners also hear and determine appeals in cases of concern about propriety and conscience raised by civil servants under the Civil Service Code which cannot be resolved through internal procedures.

Northern Ireland has a separate Commission called the Civil Service Commissioners for Northern Ireland which has the same role.

== Political neutrality ==
The Civil Service is meant to be a politically neutral body, with the function of impartially implementing the policy programme of the elected government.

Like all servants of the Crown, civil servants are legally barred from standing for election as Members of Parliament as they must uphold the duty of being politically neutral. Under regulations first adopted in 1954 and revised in 1984, members of the Senior Civil Service (the top management grades) are barred from holding office in a political party or publicly expressing controversial political viewpoints, while less senior civil servants at an intermediate (managerial) level must generally seek permission to participate in political activities. The most junior civil servants are permitted to participate in political activities, but must be politically neutral in the exercise of their duties. In periods prior to General Elections, the Civil Service undergoes purdah which further restricts their activities.

All civil servants are subject to the Official Secrets Acts 1911 to 1989, meaning that they may not disclose sensitive government information. Since 1998, there have also been restrictions on contact between civil servants and lobbyists; this followed an incident known as Lobbygate, where an undercover reporter for The Observer, posing as a business leader, was introduced by a lobbyist to a senior Downing Street official who promised privileged access to government ministers. The Committee on Standards in Public Life, also created in 1998, is responsible for regulation of contacts between public officials and lobbyists.

The increasing influence of politically appointed special advisers in government departments can reduce the political neutrality of public administration. In Thatcher's government, Alan Walters was an official adviser from 1981 to 1984, and again in 1989. Walters' criticisms "of many aspects of Treasury policy, particularly in relation to exchange rate policy" and Thatcher's refusal to dismiss him led to Nigel Lawson's resignation as chancellor in 1989. Thatcher also claimed that the 1981 budget, which increased taxes during the recession and was criticised by 364 economists, had been devised by Walters. In 2000, then-Prime Minister Tony Blair was criticised for appointing 20 special advisers (compared to eight under his predecessor John Major) and for the fact that the total salary cost of special advisers across all government departments had reached £4 million. In 2001, Stephen Byers, then Secretary of State for Transport, was forced to resign because of the actions of his special adviser Jo Moore, who instructed a departmental civil servant, Martin Sixsmith, that September 11, 2001, would be "a good day to bury bad news"; this was seen as inappropriate political manipulation of the Civil Service. In particular, under the administration of Tony Blair, the influence of two Downing Street special advisers, Jonathan Powell and Alastair Campbell, both of whom were given formal power over Downing Street civil servants, provoked widespread criticism.

The Conservative-Liberal Democrat coalition government of 2010–2015 had proposed introducing a more American style system where senior civil servants, such as permanent secretaries, became political appointees. However, this was dropped after it was considered that the existing permanent civil service style was better-suited to the government of the United Kingdom.

The political neutrality of the civil service was called into question during the 2016–2019 Brexit negotiations, with political figures such as Brexit Party Leader Nigel Farage accusing the civil service of having a "pro-Remain bias". In response Sir Mark Sedwill, Cabinet Secretary and Head of the Civil Service, issued a letter to all Department Chiefs warning that Brexit was having an "unsettling" effect on civil servants.

In March 2023, Home Secretary Suella Braverman, in an email sent to Conservative Party supporters, criticised civil servants as being part of an "activist blob of left-wing lawyers, civil servants and the Labour Party" which blocked government efforts to stop small boat crossings. Dave Penman, general secretary of the Association of First Division Civil Servants, accused Braverman of breaching the ministerial code. In response, a Conservative Party spokesperson said that the Home Secretary had not seen the wording of the email prior to its sending.

== Codes ==
=== Civil Service Code ===
A version of the civil service code was introduced in 2006 to outline the core values and standards expected of civil servants. The core values are defined as integrity, honesty, objectivity, and impartiality. A key change from previous values is the removal of anonymity within the core values. The Code includes an independent line of appeal to the Civil Service Commissioners on alleged breaches of the Code.

As of September 2020 a version updated in March 2015, with the same core values, was current. In addition to civil servants, special advisers are also covered by the code, except, due to the nature of the role, for the requirements for objectivity and impartiality.

=== Civil Service Management Code ===
The Civil Service Management Code (CSMC) sets out the regulations and instructions to departments and agencies regarding the terms and conditions of service of civil servants. It is the guiding document which gives delegation to civil service organisations, from the Minister for the Civil Service, in order for them to make internal personnel policies.

=== Civil Service Commissioners' Recruitment Code ===
The Civil Service Commissioners' Recruitment Code is maintained by the Civil Service Commissioners and is based on the principle of selection on merit on the basis of fair and open competition.

=== Osmotherly Rules ===
The Osmotherly Rules set out guidance on how civil servants should respond to Parliamentary select committees.

=== Directory of Civil Service Guidance ===
A two-volume 125-page Directory of Civil Service Guidance was published in 2000 to replace the previous Guidance on Guidance, providing short summaries of guidance on a wide range of issues and pointing to more detailed sources.

== Structure ==
The structure of the Civil Service is divided into organisations, grades and professions. Each Secretary of State has a Department which has executive agencies and non-departmental public bodies subordinate to it.

=== Grading schemes ===
The grading system used in the civil service has changed many times, and the current structure is made up of two schemes. All senior grades (Deputy Director / Grade 5 level and above) are part of the senior civil service, which is overseen by the Cabinet Office on behalf of the civil service as a whole. Below the senior civil service, each individual department/executive agency can put in place its own grading and pay arrangements, provided they still comply with the central civil service pay and review guidance.

For other grades many departments overlay their own grading structure; however, all these structures must map across to the central government structure as shown below.

All current grades are marked in bold and historical grade names are shown italics.

Group	Historic names		Current structure		Equivalent military rank (NATO Code)		
Group	Grade (pre 1971)	1971 unified grading structure	1996 SCS changes	SCS bands known as	Royal Navy	Army	Royal Air Force
Senior Civil Service	Cabinet Secretary	Grade 1A	SCS Pay Band 4	Cabinet Secretary	Admiral of the Fleet (OF-10)	Field Marshal (OF-10)	Marshal of the RAF (OF-10)
Senior Civil Service	Permanent [Under] Secretary	Grade 1	SCS Pay Band 4	Permanent Secretary	Admiral (OF-9)	General (OF-9)	Air Chief Marshal (OF-9)
Senior Civil Service	Deputy [Under] Secretary	Grade 2	SCS Pay Band 3	Director General	Vice Admiral (OF-8)	Lieutenant General (OF-8)	Air Marshal (OF-8)
Senior Civil Service	Assistant Under Secretary, latterly Under Secretary or Director General	Grade 3	SCS Pay Band 2	Director	Rear Admiral (OF-7)	Major General (OF-7)	Air Vice Marshal (OF-7)
Senior Civil Service	Under Secretary or Superintendent	Grade 4	SCS Pay Band 1	Director or Deputy Director	Commodore (OF-6)	Brigadier (OF-6)	Air Commodore (OF-6)
Senior Civil Service	Assistant Secretary or Director	Grade 5	SCS Pay Band 1	Director or Deputy Director	Commodore (OF-6)	Brigadier (OF-6)	Air Commodore (OF-6)
Senior Managers	Senior Principal [xxx] or Deputy Director	**Grade 6/Band A+**			Former Senior Captain [over six years] (OF-5+)	N/A	N/A
Senior Managers	Principal [xxx] or Assistant Director	**Grade 7/Band A**			Captain (OF-5)	Colonel (OF-5)	Group Captain (OF-5)
Senior Managers	Assistant Principal [xxx] or Deputy Assistant Director			**Senior Executive Officer** (SEO)/Band B2+	Commander (OF-4)	Lieutenant Colonel (OF-4)	Wing Commander (OF-4)
Middle Managers	Senior xxx Officer (SxO), Process and General Supervisory Grades A & B P&GS A/P&GS B, Band C1			**Senior Executive Officer** (SEO)/Band B2+	Commander (OF-4)	Lieutenant Colonel (OF-4)	Wing Commander (OF-4)
Middle Managers	Higher xxx Officer (HxO)			**Higher Executive Officer**, Process & General Supervisory Grade C P&GS C, HEO, Band C2	Lieutenant Commander (OF-3)	Major (OF-3)	Squadron Leader (OF-3)
Junior Managers	xxx Officer (xO) or Process & General Supervisory Grade D (P&GS D)			**Executive Officer** (EO) (Band D) or Industrial **Skill Zone 4** (SZ4)	Lieutenant (OF-2)	Captain (OF-2)	Flight Lieutenant (OF-2)
Administrative or Support Ranks	Administrative Officer, Higher Clerical Officer, Process & General Grade E (P&GS E), Band A1			**Administrative Officer** (AO) or Industrial **Skill Zone 3** (SZ3)	No direct equivalent: covers OR-5 to OR-9		
Administrative or Support Ranks	Clerical Officer (CO)			**Administrative Officer** (AO) or Industrial **Skill Zone 3** (SZ3)	No direct equivalent: covers OR-5 to OR-9		
Administrative or Support Ranks	Clerical Assistant (CA)			**Administrative Assistant** (AA) (Band A2) or Industrial **Skill Zone 2** (SZ2)	No direct equivalent: covers OR-3 and OR-4		
Administrative or Support Ranks	Industrial Grades			Industrial **Skill Zone 1** (SZ1)	No direct equivalent: covers OR-1 and OR-2		

=== Professions ===
The lingua franca is to describe civil servants, and in particular their grades, predominantly through a lens of administrative activity (as in the current structure of the table above), but in practice the civil service has, and always had, a number of subdivisions, with the Historic Grades having an additional designator (usually omitted for senior managers, but included from middle and junior managers) as shown as "xxx", with the major groupings being:

- Executive ([x]EO)
- Scientific ([x]SO)
- Professional and Technology ([x]PTO)

The Current Structure identifies a number of distinct professional groupings:

- Communications and Marketing
- Economics
- Engineering
- Finance
- Human Resources
- Digital, Data and Technology (formerly Information Technology)
- Inspector of Education and Training
- Internal Audit
- Knowledge and Information Management
- Law
- Medicine
- Operational Delivery
- Operational Research
- Policy Delivery
- Procurement and Contract Management
- Programme and Project Management
- Property Asset Management
- Psychology
- Science
- Social Research
- Statistics
- Tax Professionals
- Veterinarian
- Other (for minority groups, such as Investigating Officers)

Recruitment data from the 2018 Civil Service Fast Stream process showed that white applicants were 15 times more likely to be recruited than black candidates.

== Privilege days ==
A privilege day is a day of annual leave granted to employees of the civil service. These are in addition to bank holidays.

Before 2013, there were 2.5 privilege days each year:

- The King's Official Birthday is a full day usually attached to the Spring Bank Holiday, the last Monday in May, on either the Friday before the Bank Holiday or the Tuesday after (in order to create a four-day weekend), originally allocated in respect of the King's Official Birthday. In practice, the day the privilege day is taken is subject to local management policies; many staff prefer to take it at a date of their own discretion.
- Maundy Thursday was a half day on the afternoon of the Thursday of Holy Week.
- Christmas was an extra full day of leave at Christmas, in addition to the bank holidays of Christmas and Boxing Day. It was often arranged so as to connect the Christmas bank holidays to an adjacent weekend.

Since reforms by the Cabinet Office in 2013, the Maundy Thursday (Easter) and Christmas privilege days are no longer available for new civil servants. For civil servants who were in their positions when the changes came into force, these 1.5 days have been converted into additional annual leave, but lost upon promotion. Because the Queen's Birthday privilege day was granted by Queen Elizabeth II after her coronation, it would have been difficult for the Cabinet Office to abolish it by an administrative measure, so the Cabinet Office decided to retain this as a privilege day. Privilege days still count as "working days" for the purpose of freedom of information requests.

== In popular culture ==
The BBC television series Yes Minister and Yes, Prime Minister are a satire on the British civil service and its relationship with government ministers. The portrayal is a caricature of the civil service predominantly characterised through Nigel Hawthorne's Sir Humphrey Appleby.

The Thick of It, first broadcast in 2005, is a similar BBC television series that has been called "the 21st century's answer to Yes Minister". The series portrays a modernised version of the interactions between the Civil Service and the Government (chiefly in the form of special advisers), as well as the media's involvement in the process.

There is a long history of civil servants who are also literary authors, who often comment on their own institutions, including such writers as Geoffrey Chaucer, John Milton, John Dryden, Andrew Marvell, Robert Burns, William Wordsworth and Anthony Trollope, and diarist Samuel Pepys.

== See also ==
- Colonial Service
- Departments of the United Kingdom Government
- FDA
- His Majesty's Diplomatic Service
- Northern Ireland Civil Service
- Public administration
- Public and Commercial Services Union (PCS)
