= Simon Case =

British civil servant (born 1978)

The Right Honourable The Lord Case CVO PC
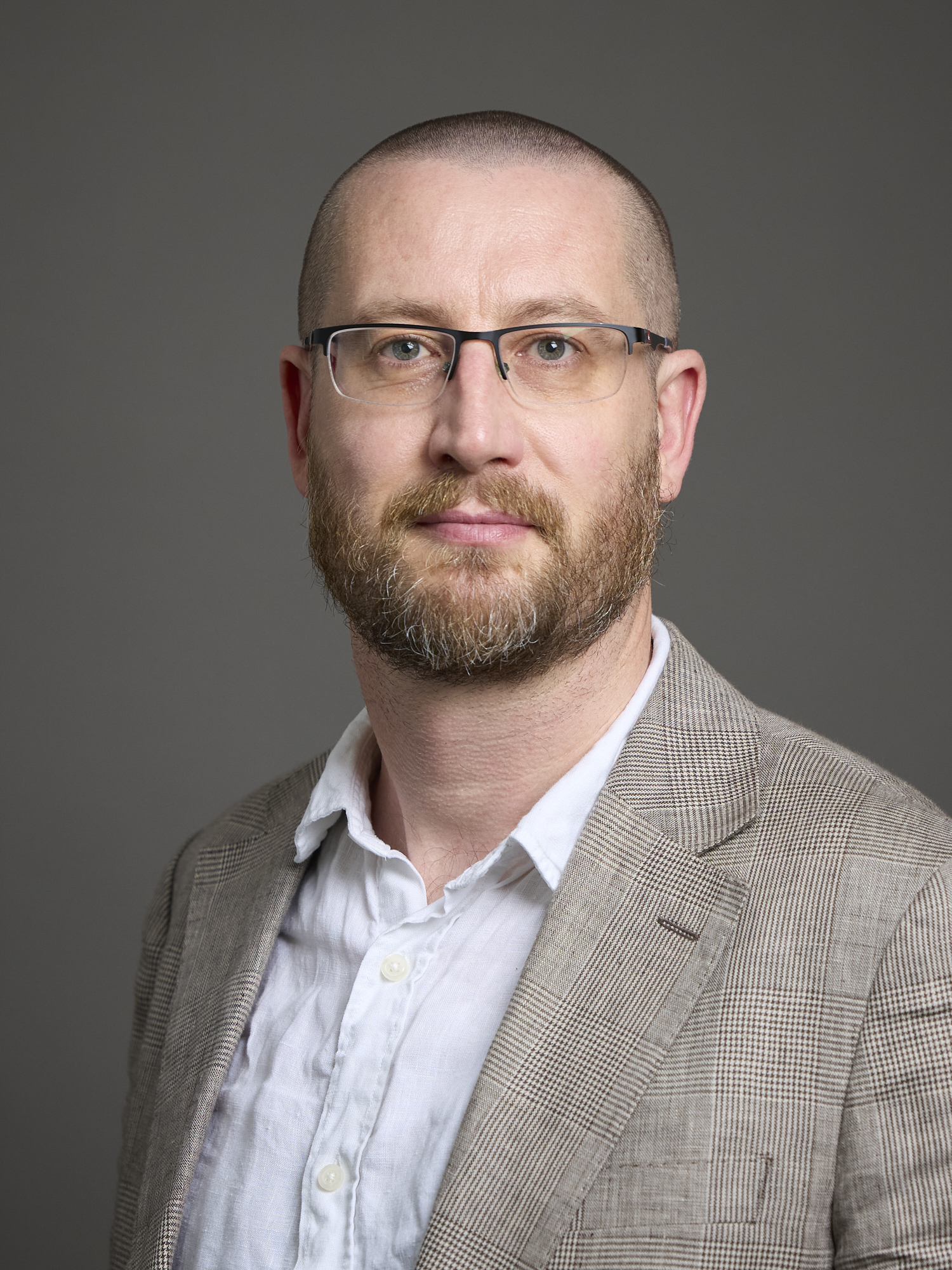
- Official portrait, 2026

Member of the House of Lords
- Lord Temporal
- Life peerage 17 July 2025

Cabinet Secretary; Head of the Home Civil Service
- In office 9 September 2020 – 15 December 2024
- Prime Minister: Boris Johnson; Liz Truss; Rishi Sunak; Keir Starmer
- Preceded by: Sir Mark Sedwill
- Succeeded by: Sir Chris Wormald

Downing Street Permanent Secretary
- In office 22 May 2020 – 1 September 2020
- Prime Minister: Boris Johnson
- Preceded by: Jeremy Heywood (2012)
- Succeeded by: Samantha Jones (Acting; 2022)

Private Secretary to the Duke of Cambridge
- In office 2018–2020
- Preceded by: Miguel Head
- Succeeded by: Christian Jones

Principal Private Secretary to the Prime Minister
- In office 11 January 2016 – 10 May 2017
- Prime Minister: David Cameron; Theresa May
- Preceded by: Chris Martin
- Succeeded by: Peter Hill

Personal details
- Born: 27 December 1978 (age 47) Bristol, England
- Party: None (crossbencher)
- Spouse: Elizabeth Kistruck (m. 2007)
- Children: 3
- Education: Trinity College, Cambridge (BA); Queen Mary, University of London (PhD)

Simon Case, Baron Case (born 27 December 1978) is a British civil servant who served as Cabinet Secretary and Head of the Home Civil Service from September 2020 to December 2024.

Case was Downing Street Permanent Secretary to Prime Minister Boris Johnson from May to September 2020. That role had been vacant for eight years after Sir Jeremy Heywood left in 2012. From January 2016 to May 2017, Case served under David Cameron and Theresa May as Principal Private Secretary to the Prime Minister. In September 2024, Case announced his intention to resign before the end of the year on health grounds.

== Early life ==
Case was born on 27 December 1978 in Bristol, England. He attended Bristol Grammar School. In 2002, he took a BA degree in history from Trinity College, Cambridge. While at Cambridge, he rowed and was President of Cambridge University Lightweight Rowing Club. In 2007, he gained a PhD degree in political history from Queen Mary, University of London. His doctoral supervisor was Professor Peter Hennessy, and his thesis was titled The Joint Intelligence Committee and the German Question, 1947–61. He signed up as a Royal Marines reservist while still at school, and subsequently transferred to the Army Reserve, serving for eight years overall.

== Career ==
Case joined the Civil Service in 2006. He worked first within the Ministry of Defence as a policy adviser. He then worked in the Northern Ireland Office and the Cabinet Office. In 2012, he served as Head of the Olympic Secretariat, a temporary team within the Cabinet Office that was set up to oversee the delivery of the 2012 Summer Olympics.

From 2012 and July 2014, Case worked at 10 Downing Street as a private secretary to the prime minister and then as deputy principal private secretary to the prime minister. He then returned to the Cabinet Office, where he was executive director of the Implementation Group. In March 2015, he joined Government Communications Headquarters (GCHQ) as Director of Strategy.

On 8 January 2016, Case was announced as the next principal private secretary to the prime minister in succession to Chris Martin, who had died while in office. He took up the appointment on 11 January 2016.

In March 2017, Case was announced as the director general for the UK–EU Partnership, being succeeded by Peter Hill as Principal Private Secretary to the prime minister on 10 May 2017. He took up the post in May 2017. In this role he was "leading the UK Government's work on exiting and seeking a new partnership with the European Union within the UK Representation to the EU". On 23 June 2017, he was appointed a Commander of the Royal Victorian Order (CVO) in recognition of his service as principal private secretary to the prime minister.

In January 2018, he was appointed Director General Northern Ireland and Ireland: in this role, he acted as the lead civil servant for finding a solution to the Irish border issue post-Brexit.

In March 2018, it was announced that Case would be the next private secretary to Prince William, Duke of Cambridge; he took up the appointment in July 2018. Also in 2018, Case was appointed a visiting professor at King's College London, having previously been a Visiting Senior Research Fellow at the university.

In July 2020 in messages between Case and Sir Mark Sedwill, Case wrote about Johnson's No 10, "I've never seen people less well-equipped to run a country". Case wrote to Sedwill: "At this rate I will struggle to last six months. These people are so mad. Not poisonous towards me (yet), but they are just madly self-defeating."

=== Head of the Civil Service and Cabinet Secretary ===
In August 2020 Case was chosen by Prime Minister Boris Johnson as Cabinet Secretary and Head of the Civil Service, succeeding Mark Sedwill on 9 September 2020, the youngest Cabinet Secretary to date.

In April 2021, in light of the Greensill scandal, Case ordered all civil servants to declare paid roles or outside interests that "might conflict" with Civil Service rules after it emerged that a senior official had joined a firm while still a civil servant.

On 15 June 2021, Case and Prime Minister Johnson jointly signed a Declaration on Government Reform intended to improve the way government operates in the UK.

In December 2021, the prime minister appointed Case to lead an inquiry into the Westminster Christmas parties controversy, where government departments had been alleged to have carried out social gatherings in late 2020 in contravention of COVID-19 regulations. Just over a week later, on 17 December 2021, it was announced that he was to recuse himself from the inquiry because of reports that a party had been held in his private office. The next day, on 18 December 2021, Case officially resigned from the inquiry position. His role in the inquiry was taken over by the civil servant Sue Gray.

In a letter to civil servants in May 2022, Case said that up to 91,000 civil servants would lose their jobs to return it to 2016 levels, which would be the biggest decrease in staff since the Second World War. Case said civil service staffing had grown "substantially" since 2016, partly because of the pandemic. "We must consider how we can streamline our workforce and equip ourselves with the skills we need to be an even more effective, lean and innovative service that continues to deliver for the people we serve," he wrote.

On 8 September 2022, Case informed then-Prime Minister Liz Truss that Queen Elizabeth II had died.

On 13 September 2022, Case was appointed a member of the Privy Council of King Charles III.

On 24 July 2024, it was reported Case was advised by his medical team to stand down in 2025 due to deteriorating health conditions; Case is suffering from a neurological condition which means he is unable to walk without a stick.

In September 2024 he was under pressure to bring forward his departure date, amid anger over a series of damaging leaks and briefings.

=== COVID-19 pandemic controversies ===
==== Gatherings ====
Case was the highest ranking public official to be implicated in the 'partygate' scandal; however, he stated he would not resign. Junior colleagues were reportedly furious that Case did not have to pay a penalty for the parties, despite having to recuse himself from investigating them.

In evidence from the Commons privileges committee, which found that the former prime minister deliberately misled MPs over lockdown gatherings, Case denied giving Boris Johnson any reassurances that Covid rules and guidance were followed at all times.

==== Lockdown Files ====
In early March 2023, The Daily Telegraph published a number of WhatsApp messages from the UK's COVID-19 lockdown period, named the Lockdown Files. Case, who was said to be in discussion with the then-Health Secretary Matt Hancock, reportedly mocked holidaymakers stuck in hotel rooms by the UK's quarantine policy, saying it was "hilarious" and how he wanted to "see some of the faces of people coming out of first class and into a Premier Inn shoe box". In some messages Case said how some opposition to COVID restrictions were "pure Conservative ideology".

Case described Johnson as a "nationally distrusted figure" and warned the public were unlikely to follow isolation rules laid down by him.

==== Covid Inquiry ====
In October 2023, Case was expected to appear before the UK Covid-19 Inquiry to give evidence, but his appearance was delayed by a "private medical matter" that required Case to take a leave of absence from his position. Later, in November 2023, given the ongoing postponement of his evidence session, "private medical information" relating to Case was shared to core members of the Covid Inquiry; this was accompanied by a Restriction Order forbidding the disclosure of the aforementioned medical notes by recipients.

=== Later career ===
In February 2025, Case became the chair of Team Barrow, a partnership between government, Westmorland and Furness Council, and BAE Systems to support the Barrow-in-Furness economy in an area heavily dependent on the BAE Systems Submarines shipyard. It is part of a government-funded £200 million project to develop the area.

Before the 2025 budget Case stated voters will look elsewhere if Rachel Reeves does not use the budget to show that "centre-ground" politicians can fix the UK's entrenched economic problems.

=== House of Lords ===
On 17 June 2025, it was announced that Case was to be awarded a life peerage, and will sit in the House of Lords as a crossbencher. He was created as Baron Case, of Fairford in the County of Gloucestershire on 17 July 2025. He was introduced to the House of Lords on 22 July 2025. On 1 May 2026, he made his maiden speech during a debate on the King's Speech during the State Opening of Parliament.

== Personal life ==
In 2007, Case married Elizabeth Kistruck, who later became chief finance officer for online used car marketplace Motorway. Case was a member of the Garrick Club until March 2024, when he resigned from it due to criticism of its men-only membership policy. He rejoined it six months later, after the club voted to accept women as members for the first time.

== Honours ==
On 13 September 2022, Case was appointed a member of the Privy Council of King Charles III, therefore receiving the honorific The Right Honourable. He was granted armorial bearings on 12 March 2026.

Country	Date	Appointment	Ribbon	Post-nominal letters	Notes
United Kingdom	23 June 2017	Commander of the Royal Victorian Order		CVO	
United Kingdom	6 February 2022	Queen Elizabeth II Platinum Jubilee Medal			
United Kingdom	6 May 2023	King Charles III Coronation Medal			

Government offices
Preceded by Chris Martin	Principal Private Secretary to the Prime Minister; 2016–2017	Succeeded by Peter Hill
Vacant Title last held by Jeremy Heywood	Downing Street Permanent Secretary; 2020	Vacant Title last held by Samantha Jones; Acting
Preceded by Sir Mark Sedwill	Head of the Home Civil Service; Cabinet Secretary; 2020–2024	Succeeded by Sir Chris Wormald
Incumbent
Court offices
Preceded by Miguel Head	Private Secretary to the Duke of Cambridge; 2018–2020	Succeeded by Christian Jones
