= Breadline Africa =

South African non-profit organisation

Breadline Africa is a non-profit organisation that supplies converted shipping containers and pre-fabricated units for poverty relief in Southern Africa. Breadline Africa provides initiatives and infrastructure to support childhood development in Southern Africa through early childhood education.

Breadline Africa was established in Cape Town, South Africa, in 1993 and registered as a non-profit organisation in South Africa and as a registered charity in the UK. Originally, they recognised that a great deal of grassroots development had to take place as a part of the nation-building process, and that government structures would not be in a position to provide all of the resources to facilitate this process. Over the years, their focus changed from being a grant giver to supporting under-resourced pre- and primary schools by providing infrastructure for children to grow and learn. Its renovated containers are used as early childhood development centres (pre-schools), primary school libraries, feeding kitchens and toilet blocks. Since its founding, it has donated more than 850 infrastructure units to poverty stricken communities.

Many of the pre-schools Breadline Africa aims to support currently have unsafe shack structures where children are cramped and age-group learning cannot take place. A new container or prefabricated classroom lets children have a safe space to grow and learn. Safe and hygienic toilet facilities in pre-schools, restore dignity for both the children and the staff. Kitchen units allow staff to provide nutritious meals to the children in a safe and hygienic environment.

Breadline Africa annually send hundreds of children under the age of seven to a day at the seaside. Although so many of these youngsters grow up within a couple of kilometers of the ocean, for many of them, this is the first time that they see waves breaking on the beach and have the opportunity to build sandcastles. This initiative is an opportunity for children to develop a love and joy for the ocean but also to learn about the environment around them and how to preserve it through play.

Since the announcement of lockdown, Breadline Africa immediately focused all efforts toward emergency feeding programmes in poor communities to alleviate hunger. Through pre-school meals, food parcel distribution and community kitchens, they have provided over 4 million meals.

== Staff ==
- Henk Kleizen is the Chair of Breadline Africa.
- Marion Wagner is the Director of Breadline Africa since 2016.
