= Bob Kerslake =

British civil servant (1955–2023)

The Right Honourable The Lord Kerslake FAcSS
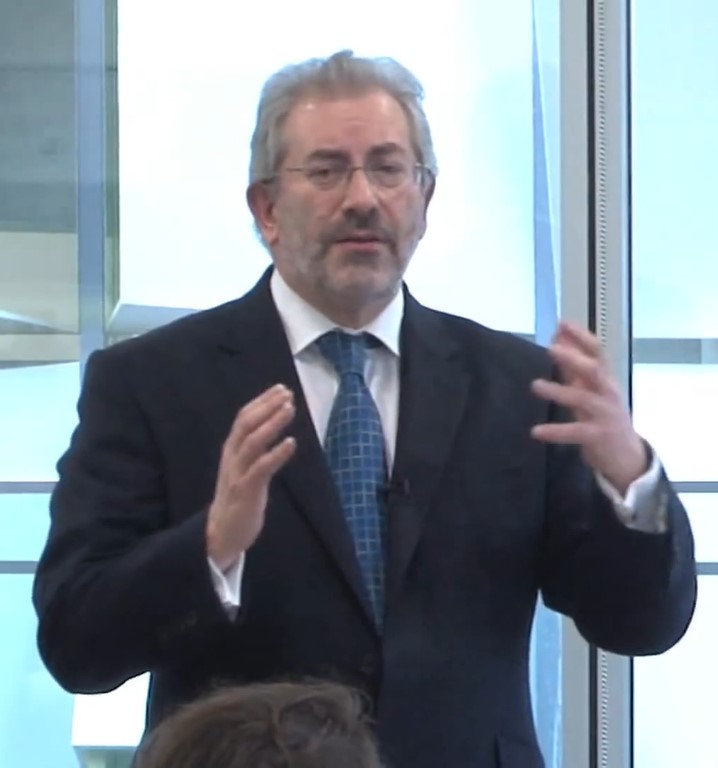
- Kerslake in 2012

Head of the Home Civil Service
- In office 1 January 2012 – September 2014
- Prime Minister: David Cameron
- Preceded by: Gus O'Donnell
- Succeeded by: Jeremy Heywood

Permanent Secretary Department for Communities and Local Government
- In office 2010–2015
- Preceded by: Peter Housden
- Succeeded by: Melanie Dawes

Member of the House of Lords
- Lord Temporal
- Life peerage 17 March 2015 – 1 July 2023

Personal details
- Born: Robert Walter Kerslake; 28 February 1955 Bath, Somerset, England
- Died: 1 July 2023 (aged 68)
- Party: None (crossbencher)

Robert Walter Kerslake, Baron Kerslake, FAcSS (28 February 1955 – 1 July 2023) was a British senior civil servant. He was the head of the Home Civil Service from 2011 to 2014, succeeding Sir Gus O'Donnell.

== Early life ==
Kerslake was born on 28 February 1955 in Bath, Somerset. He attended The Blue School, Wells. He graduated with a first class degree in Mathematics from the University of Warwick, where he was general secretary of the students' union.

== Career ==
Kerslake qualified as a member of the Chartered Institute of Public Finance and Accountancy and went on to hold a number of posts with councils in London before becoming chief executive of the London Borough of Hounslow. He then moved to Sheffield to take up the post of chief executive of Sheffield City Council in 1997. From 2008 to 2010 he was chief executive of the Homes and Communities Agency, and in September 2010 was appointed permanent secretary of the Department for Communities and Local Government. In December 2014 he was appointed the chair of King's College Hospital NHS Foundation Trust, to begin in June 2015. He was introduced as a crossbench life peer in the House of Lords on 17 March 2015, and in October 2016, he became chair of the board of governors at Sheffield Hallam University.

In July 2017, Kerslake was appointed chair of the independent investigation of the Manchester Arena bombing. The results of the investigation were published in a report, commonly referred to as the Kerslake Report, in March 2018.

In December 2017, Kerslake resigned as chair of King's College Hospital Trust saying he protested at the "dire NHS funding problems", and calling for "a fundamental rethink [of] ... the way that the NHS is funded and organised". Shortly afterward, reports surfaced that he had been asked to resign by the chair of NHS Improvement two days previously owing to the trust's "poor financial performance".

From July 2018, Kerslake chaired the UK2070 Commission focusing on city and regional inequalities in the UK. In 2019 he became chair of the New Economics Foundation. In 2022, he became chair of Stockport Mayoral Development (MDC). In 2023, it was reported that he had been working with the Labour Party in preparation for the 2024 general election.

== Death ==
Kerslake died from cancer on 1 July 2023, at the age of 68.

== Honours ==
In 2003, Kerslake was named in a Guardian list of the 100 most influential people in the public sector.

In 2004, he received an honorary doctorate from Sheffield Hallam University for his "distinctive contribution to public service".

In the 2005 New Year Honours, Kerslake was knighted "for services to Local Government".

In 2012, he became an honorary graduate (Doctor of Law) of the University of Warwick.

In 2015, Kerslake was made a life peer, taking the title Baron Kerslake, of Endcliffe in the City of Sheffield. He was also elected a fellow of the Academy of Social Sciences (FAcSS).

Government offices
| Preceded by Sir Peter Housden | Permanent Secretary of the Department for Communities and Local Government; 2010 to 2015 | Succeeded by Melanie Dawes |
| Preceded by Sir Gus O'Donnell | Head of the Home Civil Service; 2012 to 2015 | Succeeded by Sir Jeremy Heywood |
