= Jeremy Heywood =

British civil servant (1961–2018)

The Right Honourable The Lord Heywood of Whitehall GCB CVO
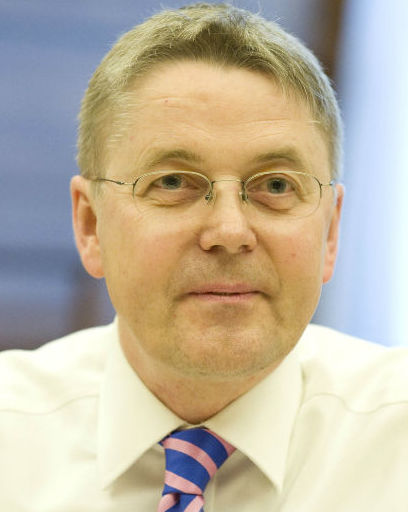
- Heywood in 2015

Cabinet Secretary
- In office 1 January 2012 – 24 October 2018
- Prime Minister: David Cameron; Theresa May
- Preceded by: Sir Gus O'Donnell
- Succeeded by: Sir Mark Sedwill

Head of the Home Civil Service
- In office September 2014 – 24 October 2018
- Prime Minister: David Cameron; Theresa May
- Preceded by: Bob Kerslake
- Succeeded by: Mark Sedwill

Downing Street Permanent Secretary
- In office 11 May 2010 – 1 January 2012
- Prime Minister: David Cameron
- Preceded by: Office established
- Succeeded by: Simon Case (2020)

Downing Street Chief of Staff
- De-facto; 10 October 2008 – 11 May 2010
- Prime Minister: Gordon Brown
- Preceded by: Stephen Carter
- Succeeded by: Edward Llewellyn

Principal Private Secretary to the Prime Minister of the United Kingdom
- In office 23 January 2008 – 11 May 2010
- Prime Minister: Gordon Brown
- Preceded by: Tom Scholar
- Succeeded by: James Bowler
- In office 4 June 1999 – 10 July 2003
- Prime Minister: Tony Blair
- Preceded by: Sir John Holmes
- Succeeded by: Ivan Rogers

Personal details
- Born: Jeremy John Heywood; 31 December 1961 Glossop, Derbyshire, England
- Died: 4 November 2018 (aged 56) London, England
- Spouse: Suzanne Cook (m. 1997)
- Children: 3
- Parents: Peter Heywood (father); Brenda Swinbank (mother)
- Education: Hertford College, Oxford (BA); London School of Economics (MSc)

Jeremy John Heywood, Baron Heywood of Whitehall, GCB, CVO (31 December 1961 – 4 November 2018) was a British civil servant who served as Cabinet Secretary to David Cameron and Theresa May from 2012 to 2018 and Head of the Home Civil Service from 2014 to 2018. He served as the Principal Private Secretary to Prime Ministers Tony Blair and Gordon Brown from 1999 to 2003 and 2008 to 2010. He also served as Downing Street Chief of Staff and the first Downing Street Permanent Secretary. After he was diagnosed with lung cancer, he took a leave of absence from June 2018, and retired on health grounds on 24 October 2018, receiving a life peerage; he died 11 days later on 4 November 2018.

== Early life and education ==
Heywood was born on 31 December 1961 in Glossop, Derbyshire, England. His parents were Peter Heywood and Brenda Swinbank, who met as teachers at Ackworth School in West Yorkshire, one of a few Quaker educational establishments in England.

Heywood was educated at the private Quaker Bootham School in York, where his father taught English. He studied history and economics at Hertford College, Oxford (where he was later made an Honorary Fellow), graduating with a Bachelor of Arts (BA) degree in 1983. He later studied economics at London School of Economics and received his Master of Science in 1986. He also attended the Program for Management Development at Harvard Business School in 1994.

== Career ==
From 1983 to 1984, Heywood worked as an economist at the Health and Safety Executive, before moving to the Treasury, and became the principal private secretary to the chancellor of the exchequer, then Norman Lamont, at the age of 30, having to help mitigate the fallout from Black Wednesday after less than a month in the job. He remained in this role throughout the 1990s under Chancellors Kenneth Clarke and Gordon Brown. He was economic and domestic policy secretary to Tony Blair from 1997 to 1998, before being promoted to be the Principal Private Secretary to Prime Minister Tony Blair in 1999. He stayed in this position until 2003.

He became a managing director of the UK Investment Banking Division at Morgan Stanley, where he was embroiled in the aftermath of the collapse of Southern Cross Healthcare.

Upon Gordon Brown becoming prime minister in 2007, Heywood returned to government as head of domestic policy and strategy at the Cabinet Office. In January 2008 he was once again appointed principal private secretary to the prime minister; (it has sometimes been claimed that he was subsequently and additionally appointed to the position of Downing Street Chief of Staff, after Stephen Carter's resignation as the Prime Minister's Chief of Strategy, but Heywood himself denied that this was ever the case).

In 2010, after David Cameron became prime minister, Heywood was replaced as principal private secretary by James Bowler. He returned to the civil service and was subsequently appointed the first Downing Street Permanent Secretary, a role created for the purpose of liaising between the Cabinet Secretary and the chief of staff within the Cabinet Office.

=== Cabinet Secretary ===
On 11 October 2011 it was announced that Heywood would replace Sir Gus O'Donnell as the Cabinet Secretary, the highest-ranked official in Her Majesty's Civil Service, upon the latter's retirement in January 2012. It was also announced that Heywood would not concurrently hold the roles of Head of the Home Civil Service and Permanent Secretary for the Cabinet Office, as would usually be the case. These positions instead went to Sir Bob Kerslake and Ian Watmore respectively. On 1 January, Heywood was knighted and officially made Cabinet Secretary. In July 2014 it was announced that Kerslake would step down and Heywood would take the title of Head of the Home Civil Service in the coming Autumn. In September, Heywood duly succeeded Kerslake. As of September 2015, Heywood was paid a salary of between £195,000 and £199,999, making him one of the 328 most highly paid people in the British public sector at that time.

In June 2013, he visited The Guardian's offices to warn its then editor, Alan Rusbridger, that The Guardian's involvement with Edward Snowden could make it a target for "our guys" in British intelligence and "Chinese agents on your staff".

=== Criticism ===
He was criticised when he vetoed the release to the Chilcot Inquiry of 150 letters and records of phone calls between Tony Blair and President George W. Bush before the 2003 Iraq War.

Heywood and former prime minister David Cameron were criticised in the 2021 investigation report into the Greensill lobbying scandal. Heywood was found to be primarily responsible for businessman Lex Greensill being given a role in government and "extraordinarily privileged" access into 10 Downing Street.

It has been claimed that Heywood lobbied Barclays to lower its estimates of the cost of borrowing dollars during what became known as the Libor scandal.

== Illness and death ==
After years of heavy smoking, despite having quit around twenty years earlier, Heywood was diagnosed with lung cancer in June 2017 and took a leave of absence from his position in June 2018 owing to his illness. He retired on health grounds on 24 October 2018, and died on 4 November at the age of 56.

== Personal life ==
Heywood was the son of archaeologist Brenda Swinbank.

In 1997, Heywood married Suzanne Cook. Together they had three children, including twins. Cook, who became a CBE in the King's Birthday Honours in 2024, is a former civil servant who moved into the private sector: she has been managing director of the Exor Group since 2016 and chair of CNH Industrial since 2018.

In 2021, Suzanne published a biography, What Does Jeremy Think?: Jeremy Heywood and the Making of Modern Britain.

== Honours ==
Heywood was appointed Companion of the Order of the Bath (CB) in the 2002 New Year Honours, and a Commander of the Royal Victorian Order (CVO) in 2003. He was promoted to Knight Commander of the Order of the Bath (KCB) in the 2012 New Year Honours, and was thereby granted the title Sir. The Parliamentary Public Administration Committee cited the example of Heywood's knighthood as an automatic honour granted due to his position. He was promoted to Knight Grand Cross of the Order of the Bath on 31 October 2018.

On Heywood's retirement as Cabinet Secretary on 24 October 2018, Prime Minister Theresa May nominated him for a life peerage in recognition of his distinguished service to public life. He was created Baron Heywood of Whitehall, of Glossop in the County of Derbyshire, on 26 October 2018, shortly before his death and before he was able to take his seat in the House of Lords.

Country	Date	Appointment	Ribbon	Post-nominal letters	Notes
United Kingdom	31 December 2001	Companion of the Order of the Bath		CB	Promoted to KCB in 2011
United Kingdom	24 December 2003	Commander of the Royal Victorian Order		CVO	
United Kingdom	31 December 2011	Knight Commander of the Order of the Bath		KCB	Promoted to GCB in 2018
United Kingdom	31 October 2018	Knight Grand Cross of the Order of the Bath		GCB	

Government offices
Preceded by Sir John Holmes	Principal Private Secretary to the Prime Minister; 1999–2003	Succeeded by Ivan Rogers
Preceded by Tom Scholar	Principal Private Secretary to the Prime Minister; 2008–2010	Succeeded by James Bowler
Preceded by Stephen Carter	Downing Street Chief of Staff; 2008–2010	Succeeded by Edward Llewellyn
New title	Downing Street Permanent Secretary; 2010–2012	Office abolished
Preceded by Sir Gus O'Donnell	Cabinet Secretary; 2012–2018	Succeeded by Sir Mark Sedwill
Preceded by Sir Bob Kerslake	Head of the Home Civil Service; 2014–2018	Succeeded by Sir Mark Sedwill
