= Cabinet Secretary (United Kingdom) =

Head of the British Civil Service

- Royal Arms as used by His Majesty's Government

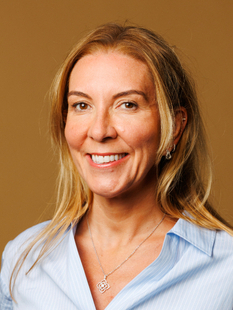
- Incumbent; Dame Antonia Romeo since 19 February 2026
- Cabinet Office
- Reports to: Prime Minister; Chancellor of the Duchy of Lancaster
- Appointer: Prime Minister
- Term length: At His Majesty's pleasure
- Inaugural holder: Sir Maurice Hankey
- Formation: 1916

The cabinet secretary is the most senior civil servant in the United Kingdom and is based in the Cabinet Office. The person in this role acts as the senior policy adviser to the prime minister and Cabinet, and as the secretary to the Cabinet is responsible to all ministers for the efficient running of government. The role is currently occupied by Dame Antonia Romeo.

== Origin ==
The position of cabinet secretary was created in 1916 for Sir Maurice Hankey, when the existing secretariat of the Committee of Imperial Defence, headed by Hankey, became secretariat to a newly organised War Cabinet.

== Responsibilities ==
=== Civil Service ===
Since 1981 (except for a period 2011–2014), the position of cabinet secretary has been combined with the role of Head of the Civil Service. The cabinet secretary used to also hold the position of the permanent secretary of the Cabinet Office, but this has been passed to the chief operating officer of the civil service. The first means that the cabinet secretary is responsible for all the civil servants of the various departments within government (except the Foreign Office), chairing the Permanent Secretaries Management Group (PSMG) which is the principal governing body of the civil service. The second means that the cabinet secretary is responsible for leading the government department that provides administrative support to the prime minister and Cabinet. The post is appointed by the prime minister with the advice of the out-going cabinet secretary and the First Civil Service Commissioner.

=== Cabinet ===
The responsibilities of the job vary from time to time and depend very much on the personal qualities of both the prime minister and cabinet secretary of the day. In most cases the true influence of the cabinet secretary extends far beyond administrative matters, and reaches to the very heart of the decision-making process. For instance, the cabinet secretary is responsible for administering the Ministerial Code which governs the conduct of ministers (also known as the Rule Book and formerly Questions of Procedure for Ministers). In this duty the cabinet secretary may be asked to investigate leaks within government, and enforce Cabinet discipline. Unusually in a democracy, this gives the unelected cabinet secretary some authority over elected ministers (a situation satirised in the BBC sitcom Yes, Prime Minister), although the constitutional authority of the code is somewhat ambiguous.

The cabinet secretary is, with the Private Secretary to the Sovereign and the Principal Private Secretary to the Prime Minister, part of the "golden triangle" of officials responsible for supporting the sovereign to appoint a prime minister in the event of a hung parliament, when it is not immediately clear who can command a majority in the House of Commons. This is important for ensuring that the sensitive process runs smoothly and that the sovereign is not implicated in political debate or manoeuvres.

=== Intelligence ===
The cabinet secretary is responsible for overseeing the intelligence services and their relationship to the government, though since 2002 this responsibility has been delegated to a full-time role (initially as Security and Intelligence Co-ordinator, now the National Security Adviser), with the cabinet secretary focussing on civil service reforms to help deliver the government's policy programme.

== Appointment ==
Previously the Cabinet Secretary was appointed on the advice of the outgoing incumbent. The 2024 appointment process consisted of shortlisted candidates took "leadership assessments" and an interview chaired by the First Civil Service Commissioner Gisela Stuart, Brian McBride (Lead Non Executive Director MoD, and Non-Executive member of the Civil Service Senior Leadership Committee), Gus O'Donnell (former Cabinet Secretary) and Dame Sharon White (former Second Permanent Secretary at HM Treasury). The appointment will be made by the Prime Minister.

== 2011 restructuring ==
It was announced on 11 October 2011 that Gus O'Donnell would retire at the end of 2011, and following this the three roles then performed by the cabinet secretary would be split: the cabinet secretary would provide policy advice to the prime minister and Cabinet; the Head of the Civil Service would provide leadership for the whole civil service; and the permanent secretary would oversee the Cabinet Office. It was announced later that the officeholders would be Jeremy Heywood as cabinet secretary, Bob Kerslake as Head of the Civil Service, and Ian Watmore as permanent secretary at the Cabinet Office.

In July 2014 it was announced that Kerslake would step down and Heywood would take the title of head of the Civil Service with a chief executive of the Civil Service reporting to Heywood and holding Watmore's post at the Cabinet Office. Heywood's retirement on health grounds was announced on 24 October 2018, and he was replaced by Mark Sedwill. As of January 2025, Sir Chris Wormald is Cabinet Secretary and Head of the Home Civil Service and Cat Little is Cabinet Office Permanent Secretary and COO of the Civil Service; as such, the 2011 restructuring has been partially undone and two of O'Donnell's roles are again held by the same person, while the third has remained separate.

== List of cabinet secretaries ==
#	Portrait	Name (birth–death)	Term of office		Concurrent office(s)	Peerage
1		Sir Maurice Hankey (1877–1963)	1916	1938	Clerk of the Privy Council	Baron Hankey in 1939
2		Sir Edward Bridges (1892–1969)	1938	1946	Head of the Home Civil Service; Permanent Secretary to the Treasury	Baron Bridges in 1957
3		Sir Norman Brook (1902–1967)	1947	1962	Head of the Home Civil Service; Permanent Secretary to the Treasury	Baron Normanbrook in 1962
4		Sir Burke Trend (1914–1987)	1963	1972		Baron Trend in 1974 for life
5		Sir John Hunt (1919–2008)	1973	1979		Baron Hunt of Tanworth in 1980 for life
6		Sir Robert Armstrong (1927–2020)	1979	1987	Head of the Home Civil Service	Baron Armstrong of Ilminster in 1988 for life
7		Sir Robin Butler (b. 1938)	1988	1998	Head of the Home Civil Service	Baron Butler of Brockwell in 1998 for life
8		Sir Richard Wilson (b. 1942)	1998	2002	Head of the Home Civil Service	Baron Wilson of Dinton in 2002 for life
9		Sir Andrew Turnbull (b. 1945)	1 September 2002	1 March 2005	Head of the Home Civil Service	Baron Turnbull in 2005 for life
10		Sir Gus O'Donnell (b. 1952)	1 March 2005	31 December 2011	Head of the Home Civil Service	Baron O'Donnell in 2012 for life
11		Sir Jeremy Heywood (1961–2018)	1 January 2012	24 October 2018	Head of the Home Civil Service	Baron Heywood of Whitehall in 2018 for life
12		Sir Mark Sedwill (b. 1964)	24 October 2018	9 September 2020	Head of the Home Civil Service	Baron Sedwill in 2020 for life
13		Simon Case (b. 1978)	9 September 2020	15 December 2024	Head of the Home Civil Service	Baron Case in 2025 for life
14		Sir Chris Wormald (b. 1968)	16 December 2024	12 February 2026	Head of the Civil Service	Baron Wormald in 2026 for life
15		Dame Antonia Romeo (b. 1974)	19 February 2026	Incumbent	Head of the Civil Service	

== See also ==
- Prime Minister's Office
- Private Secretary
- Principal Private Secretary
- Permanent secretary
- Permanent Secretary of the Welsh Government
- Head of the Northern Ireland Civil Service
- Permanent Secretary to the Scottish Government
- Cabinet of the United Kingdom
