= Cabinet Office =

Ministerial department of the UK Government

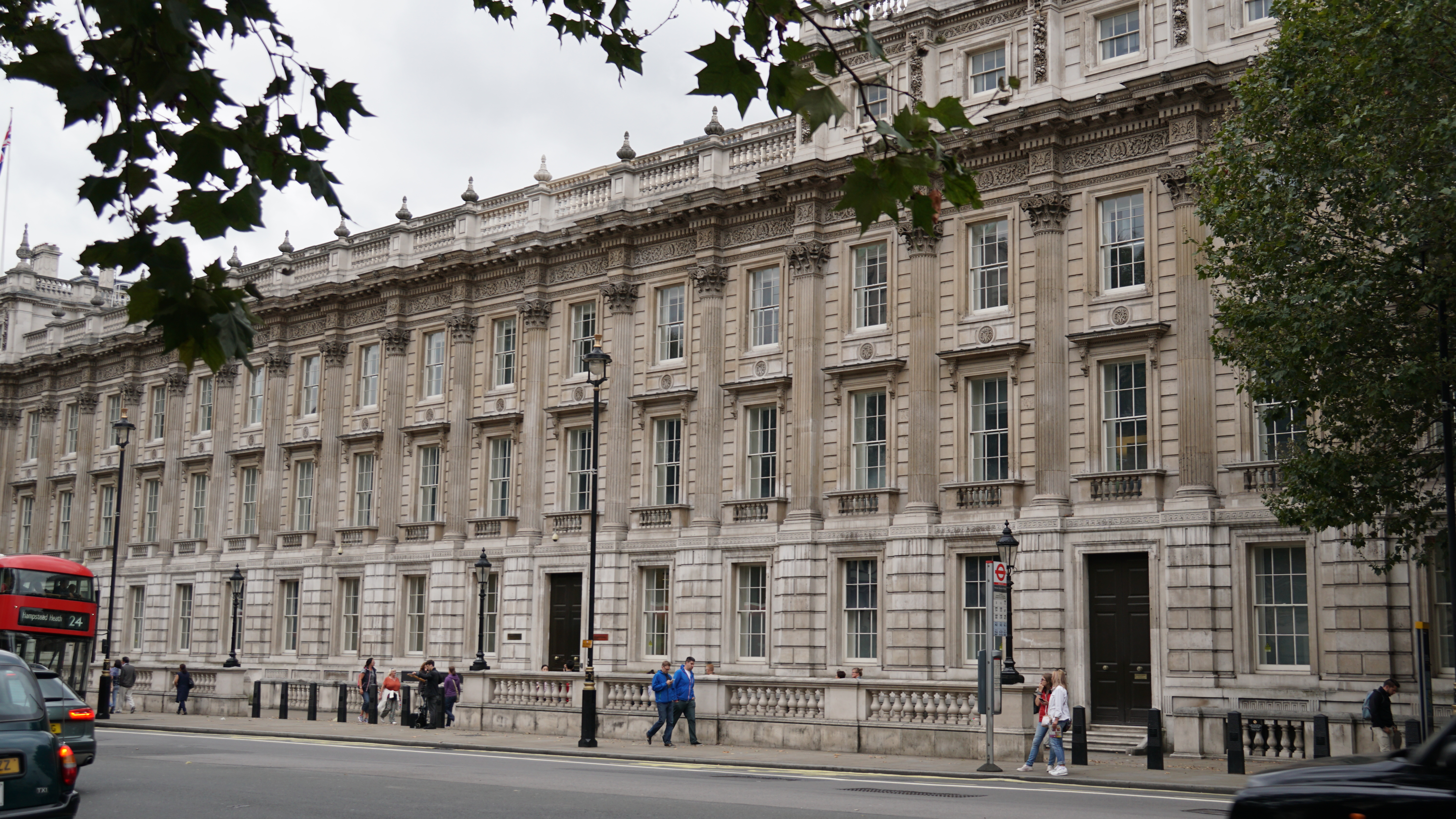
- 70 Whitehall, Westminster

Department overview
- Formed: December 1916; 109 years ago
- Preceding Department: Committee of Imperial Defence
- Jurisdiction: Government of the United Kingdom
- Headquarters: 70 Whitehall, London, United Kingdom; 51°30′13″N 0°7′36″W
- Employees: 5,385 (as of March 2026)
- Annual budget: £2.1 billion (current) & £400 million (capital) for 2011–12
- Ministers responsible: Andy Burnham, Prime Minister; Louise Haigh, First Secretary of State, Chancellor of the Duchy of Lancaster, and Minister for the Cabinet Office
- Department executives: Dame Antonia Romeo, Cabinet Secretary and Head of the Civil Service; Cat Little, Cabinet Office Permanent Secretary and Chief Operating Officer of the Civil Service; Harriet Aldridge, Chief Operating Officer for the Cabinet Office; Michael Ellam, Second Permanent Secretary in the Cabinet Office, European Union and International Economic Affairs; Ellen Atkinson, Director General, Propriety and Constitution Group
- Child agencies: OneGov Delivery Agency; Government Commercial Agency; Government Property Agency
- Website: gov.uk/cabinet-office

The Cabinet Office is a ministerial department and senior decision-making office of the Government of the United Kingdom, responsible for supporting the prime minister and Cabinet. The Cabinet Office is also the corporate headquarters of the British Civil Service and it is composed of various units that support Cabinet committees and coordinate the delivery of government objectives via other departments. As of March 2026, it had more than 5,385 staff, mostly civil servants, many of whom work in Whitehall and Canary Wharf. Staff working in the Prime Minister's Office, 10 Downing Street, are part of the Cabinet Office.

== Responsibilities ==
The Cabinet Office's core functions are:

- Supporting collective government, helping to ensure the effective development, coordination, and implementation of policy;
- Supporting the National Security Council and the Joint Intelligence Organisation, coordinating the government's response to crises, and managing the UK's cyber security;
- Promoting efficiency and reform across government through innovation, transparency, better procurement, and project management, transforming the delivery of services, and improving the capability of the Civil Service;
- Political and constitutional reform

The Cabinet Office has responsibility for the following at the UK national level:

- the Home Civil Service
- the Independent Parliamentary Standards Authority
- the Government Commercial Function and the Government Commercial Organisation.
- the government's digital, data, and technology (DDaT) function is through the Government Digital Service
- the What Works Network, a network of organisations building evidence in public policy spaces.

== History ==
The department was formed in December 1916 from the secretariat of the Committee of Imperial Defence under Sir Maurice Hankey, the first Cabinet Secretary.

Traditionally, the most important part of the Cabinet Office's role was facilitating collective decision-making by the Cabinet, through running and supporting Cabinet-level committees. This is still its principal role, but since the absorption of some of the functions of the Civil Service Department in 1981 the Cabinet Office has also helped to ensure that a wide range of Ministerial priorities are taken forward across Whitehall.

It also contains miscellaneous units that do not sit well in other departments. For example:

- The Historical Section was founded in 1906 as part of the Committee for Imperial Defence and is concerned with Official Histories.
- The Joint Intelligence Committee was founded in 1936 and transferred to the department in 1957. It deals with intelligence assessments and directing the national intelligence organisations of the UK.
- The Ceremonial Branch was founded in 1937 and transferred to the department in 1981. It was originally concerned with all ceremonial functions of state, but today it handles honours and appointments.

In modern times, the Cabinet Office often takes on responsibility for areas of policy which are the priority of the Government of the time. The units that administer these areas migrate in and out of the Cabinet Office as government priorities (and governments) change.

Since 2016 the size of the Cabinet Office and the UK Civil Service has grown due to new responsibilities after Brexit and also during the Covid pandemic. In 2025 the UK Government announced a reduction on numbers which will hope to save £110m a year by 2028.

=== 2026 Reorganisation ===
After becoming prime minister on 20 July 2026, Andy Burnham created an Office for the Prime Minister and Cabinet (OPMC) within the Cabinet Office as part of a reorganisation of the centre of government. The OPMC is led by the Cabinet Secretary, Dame Antonia Romeo, and comprises the Prime Minister's Office at 10 Downing Street, London, the Number 10 North unit at Heron House in central Manchester, and core Cabinet Office functions serving the Prime Minister and Cabinet. It will also contain a new AI Taskforce. Many of the Cabinet Office's remaining functions will be managed by a new "OneGov Delivery Agency" to be established in April 2027. The agency will manage operational services at arm’s length, including the Government Recruitment Service, Pensions, Shared Services, Government Car Service, and Security Vetting.

== Ministers and civil servants ==
Cabinet Office ministers are as follows, with cabinet members in bold:

Minister	Portrait	Office	Portfolio
**Andy Burnham** MP		Prime Minister; First Lord of the Treasury; Minister for the Civil Service; Minister for the Union	Head of government; appoints members of the government; oversees the operation of the Civil Service and government agencies; ensures the government acts in the interest of all constituent countries of the United Kingdom; principal government figure in the House of Commons.
**Louise Haigh** MP		First Secretary of State; Chancellor of the Duchy of Lancaster; Minister for the Cabinet Office	As Chancellor of the Duchy of Lancaster, responsible Oversight of all Cabinet Office policy; Coordination and delivery of cross-government priorities; Oversight of national security policy coordination; Oversight of state reform and Civil Service reform; Communications policy for Government; Propriety and ethics; Public appointments
**Hamish Falconer** MP		Minister of State for Intergovernmental Relations and European Relations	EU Policy and relations including the Windsor Framework; Inter-governmental relations; Constitution; Honours. Jointly with Foreign, Commonwealth and Development Office
**Kanishka Narayan** MP		Minister of State for Artificial Intelligence	AI Strategy; AI Taskforce; AI Security Institute; AI Economics Institute (with HM Treasury); public sector adoption. Jointly with Department for Business, Innovation, Science and Trade.
Dan Jarvis MP		Minister of State for Security	Responsible for counter terrorism and extremism; state threats; cyber security and crime; serious and organised crime; oversight of the National Crime Agency; international criminality; aviation and maritime security; economic crime (excluding fraud); extradition; exclusions and deprivations; MP security and VIP protection; online safety; anti-corruption. Jointly with Home Office.
Sally Jameson MP		Parliamentary Secretary for the Cabinet Office	No10 North Devolution strategy; OneGov sponsorship (including pensions). Jointly with Ministry of Housing, Communities and Local Government
Dan Tomlinson MP		Parliamentary Secretary for the Cabinet Office	UK Statistical Authority sponsorship; No10 North Local growth strategy. Jointly with HM Treasury.
Mark Ferguson MP		Parliamentary Secretary for the Cabinet Office	School for Government; Business planning and oversight of the Cabinet Office; Supporting on Civil Service Reform; Procurement; Property; Communications functional reform and policy for Government
Fiona Twycross, Baroness Twycross		Parliamentary Secretary for the Cabinet Office	Lords business; Standards and ethics; Duty of Candour; IBCA sponsorship; Inquiries policy; Freedom of Information; Public Appointments; Support on resilience; Correspondence. Jointly with Department for Digital, Culture, Media and Sport.

=== Leaders of the Commons and Lords ===
Leaders of the Houses of Commons and Lords, supported by the Cabinet Office, are as follows:

Minister	Portrait	Office	Portfolio
**Sir Alan Campbell** MP		Leader of the House of Commons; Lord President of the Council	The Government's Legislative Programme, chairing the Cabinet Committee; Managing and announcing the business of the House of Commons weekly and facilitating motions and debate in the Chamber, particularly on House business; Government's representative in the House (sitting on the House of Commons Commission, Public Accounts Commission, and the Speaker's Committees on the Independent Parliamentary Standards Authority); House of Commons representative in Government; Parliamentary reform and policy; Ministerial responsibility for the Privy Council Office.
**Angela Smith, Baroness Smith of Basildon**		Leader of the House of Lords; Lord Privy Seal	Management and delivery of the Government's legislative programme (through the House of Lords) and facilitating the passage of individual bills; Leading the House (in the Chamber and as a key member of domestic committees to do with procedure, conduct, and the internal governance of the House); Issues connected to the House of Lords and its governance; Speaking for the Government in the Chamber on a range of issues, including repeating in the House of Lords statements made to the Commons by the Prime Minister; Ceremonial and other duties as the Lord Keeper of the Privy Seal.
Ray Collins, Baron Collins of Highbury		Deputy Leader of the House of Lords	The Deputy Leader of the House of Lords supports the House of Lords in its job of questioning government ministers, improving legislation and debating topics of national significance.

=== Civil servants ===
The Cabinet Office's most senior civil servants are as follows:

Name	Portrait	Position	Term start
Dame Antonia Romeo		Cabinet Secretary; Head of the Civil Service	19 February 2026; 8 months ago
Cat Little		Cabinet Office Permanent Secretary; Chief Operating Officer of the Civil Service	1 April 2024; 2 years ago
Harriet Aldridge		Chief Operating Officer for the Cabinet Office	1 May 2026; 5 months ago
Simon Baugh		Chief Executive of Government Communications	October 2021; 5 years ago
Richard Hornby		Chief Financial Officer and Director of Assurance, Finance and Controls, Cabinet Office	February 2020; 6 years ago
Vincent Devine		Government Chief Security Officer	December 2021; 4 years ago
Kathryn Al-Shemmeri		Chief People Officer, Cabinet Office	September 2022; 4 years ago
Ellen Atkinson		Director General, Propriety and Constitution Group (interim)	August 2025; 1 year ago
Jonathan Powell		National Security Adviser	2 December 2024; 22 months ago
Dame Madeleine Alessandri		Chair of the Joint Intelligence Committee	1 July 2023; 3 years ago
Clara Swinson		Second Permanent Secretary in the Cabinet Office, Head of Mission Delivery Unit	September 2024; 2 years ago
Michael Ellam		Second Permanent Secretary in the Cabinet Office, European Union and International Economic Affairs	13 January 2025; 21 months ago

The Cabinet Office also supports the work of the Whips' Offices of the House of Lords and House of Commons.

The Parliamentary Private Secretary to the Cabinet Office supports the work of ministers.

== Committees ==
Cabinet committees have two key purposes:

- To relieve the burden on the Cabinet by dealing with business that does not need to be discussed at full Cabinet. Appeals to the Cabinet should be infrequent, and Ministers chairing Cabinet Committees should exercise discretion in advising the prime minister whether to allow them.
- To support the principle of collective responsibility by ensuring that, even though a question may never reach the Cabinet itself, it will be fully considered. In this way, the final judgement is sufficiently authoritative that Government as a whole can be expected to accept responsibility for it. In this sense, Cabinet Committee decisions have the same authority as Cabinet decisions.

== Buildings ==
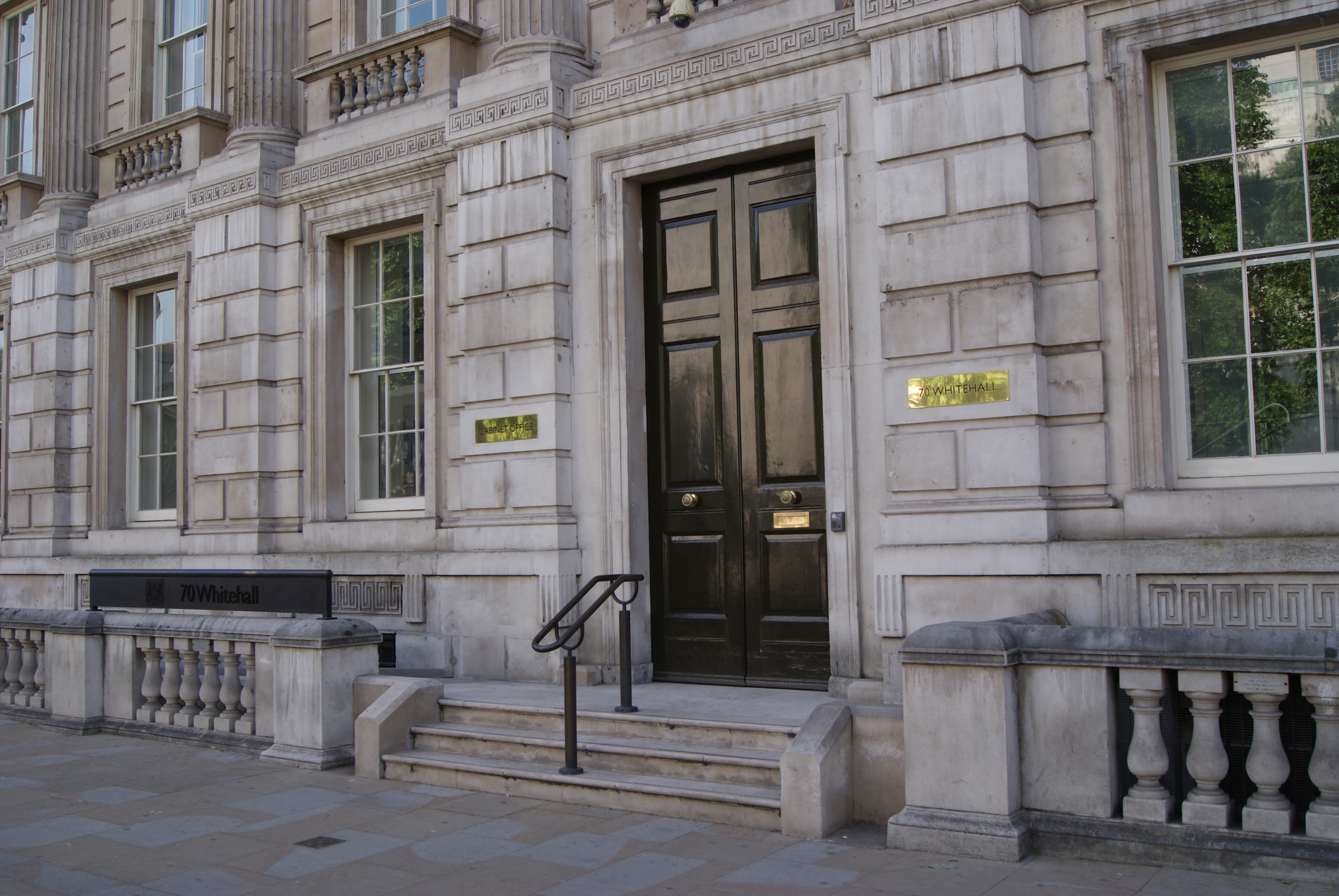
The entrance to the Cabinet Office

The main building of the Cabinet Office is at 70 Whitehall, adjacent to Downing Street. The building connects three historically distinct properties, as well as the remains of Henry VIII's 1530 tennis courts, part of the Palace of Whitehall, which can be seen within the building. The Whitehall frontage was designed by Sir John Soane and completed by Sir Charles Barry between 1845 and 1847 as the Treasury Buildings. Immediately to the west Dorset House (1700) connects the front of the building to William Kent's Treasury (1733–36), which faces out onto Horse Guards Parade. The latter is built over the site of the Cockpit, used for cock fighting in the Tudor period, and subsequently as a theatre. In the early 1960s, the buildings were restored and many of the Tudor remains were exposed and repaired. Significant renovations between 2010 and 2016 converted many of the floors to open plan and created new office space. The Cabinet Office Briefing Rooms are located on this site.

The department occupies other buildings in Whitehall and the surrounding area, including part of the Government Offices Great George Street at 1 Horse Guards, as well as sites in other parts of the country.

== See also ==
- British Civil Service
- Cabinet Office Briefing Rooms
- Prime Minister's Strategy Unit
- Social Exclusion Task Force
- Budget of the United Kingdom
