= Timothy Bligh =

British Royal Navy officer and business executive (1918–1969)

SIr Timothy Bligh KBE DSO DSC
- Bligh in 1966

Principal Private Secretary to the Prime Minister
- In office 1959–1964
- Prime Minister: Harold Macmillan; Alec Douglas-Home
- Preceded by: Frederick Bishop
- Succeeded by: Derek Mitchell

Personal details
- Born: Timothy James Bligh; 2 September 1918
- Died: 12 March 1969 (aged 50) Swanley, Kent
- Spouse: Ruth Pamela Robertson (m. 1945)
- Children: 3
- Education: Winchester School
- Alma mater: Balliol College, Oxford
- Civilian awards: OBE; KBE (1963)

Military service
- Allegiance: United Kingdom
- Branch/service: Royal Navy
- Years of service: 1940–1945
- Rank: Lieutenant commander
- Battles/wars: Second World War
- Military awards: DSC and bar DSO

Sir Timothy James Bligh, KBE, DSO, DSC* (2 September 1918 – 12 March 1969) was a British Royal Navy officer, civil servant and business executive, who served as Principal Private Secretary to two successive prime ministers; Harold Macmillan and Alec Douglas-Home.

== Early life ==
Bligh was born on 2 September 1918, the only surviving son of Sir Edward Clare Bligh (1887–1976), who was Chief Officer of Welfare Department, London County Council, 1932–1951. Bligh was educated at Winchester College and Balliol College, Oxford, graduating in 1940.

== Career ==
During the Second World War, Bligh served in the Royal Navy in the North Atlantic, the English Channel and the Mediterranean, and was twice wounded. He was awarded the DSC and bar and the DSO, and was appointed an OBE. Bligh joined the Civil Service in 1946 as an assistant principal in the Treasury, and was rapidly promoted, reaching the rank of under-secretary in 1959. That year he was appointed principal private secretary to the prime minister, Harold Macmillan, whom he served until the latter's resignation in October 1963. Bligh then served Macmillan's successor, Alec Douglas-Home in the same capacity, until Douglas-Home's defeat in the 1964 British general election.

In 1964 Bligh left the government's service to become a director of the media chain the Thomson Organisation, and became its assistant managing director in 1966. He was briefly active in Conservative politics, as an alderman on the Greater London Council from 1967.

== Profumo affair ==
As the prime minister's principal private secretary, Bligh was peripherally involved in the Profumo affair of 1963, a scandal which brought about the resignation of John Profumo as Secretary of State for War and destabilised the government. Before the affair broke, Bligh had been advised of the possibility that Profumo had compromised national security through a sexual affair with a 19-year-old showgirl, Christine Keeler, who was a known associate of the society osteopath Stephen Ward, a suspected Soviet sympathiser. Bligh interviewed Profumo, who denied any wrongdoing but asked if he should resign to avoid embarrassing the government. He was advised that he should not. Later, when the affair was unravelling, Bligh met Ward, who by then, at the Home Office's instigation, was under police investigation regarding possible vice charges. Ward asked Bligh if there was anything that could be done to halt the investigation, which was proving ruinous to his practice. Bligh took no action. In June 1963 when the scandal reached its climax, Macmillan being absent in Scotland it was to Bligh that Profumo first confessed his guilt, and it was Bligh who transmitted the contents of Profumo's resignation letter to the prime minister.

== Private life ==
Bligh married Ruth Pamela Robertson in 1945; there were two sons and one daughter from the marriage. In the 1963 Prime Minister's Resignation Honours he was appointed a Knight Commander of the Order of the British Empire. Bligh died at his home in Kent on 12 March 1969, after a long illness.

Government offices
Preceded by Frederick Bishop	Principal Private Secretary to the Prime Minister; 1959–1964	Succeeded by Derek Mitchell
