= Eric Seal =

British civil servant

Sir Eric Seal KBE CB
- Sir Eric Arthur Seal in 1955

Principal Private Secretary to the Prime Minister
- In office 1940–1941
- Prime Minister: Winston Churchill
- Preceded by: Arthur Rucker
- Succeeded by: John Martin

Personal details
- Born: Eric Arthur Seal; 16 September 1898 Ilford, London
- Died: 31 March 1972 (aged 73) West Itchenor, Sussex
- Spouse: Gladys Leadbitter (m. 1926)
- Children: 3
- Occupation: Civil servant
- Awards: CB (1941); KBE (1955)

Military service
- Allegiance: United Kingdom
- Branch/service: Royal Flying Corps; Royal Air Force
- Years of service: 1914–1918
- Rank: Second lieutenant
- Unit: No. 62 Squadron RAF
- Battles/wars: First World War

Sir Eric Arthur Seal KBE CB (16 September 1898 – 31 March 1972) was a British civil servant who served as Principal Private Secretary to the Prime Minister, Winston Churchill, during World War II; and as Principal Private Secretary to Winston Churchill in his role as First Lord of the Admiralty in 1939. These two positions are public, rather than private posts. He was chairman of the UK Civil Service for seventeen years.

== Early life ==
Eric Arthur Seal was born in Ilford, London Borough of Redbridge, the son of Arthur John Todd Seal and Wilhelmina Henrietta "Mina" Youll. His parents had married in Edmonton, London on 10 August 1895. He was the eldest of 6 children. During the First World War he served as a Second lieutenant in the Royal Flying Corps and later in the Royal Air Force in No. 62 Squadron RAF.

== Career ==
Seal initially entered the Patent Office in 1921, and continued to work his way through the UK Civil Service ranks within the Admiralty from 1925 onwards. He is referred to in Arthur Marder’s memoirs as a person of influence within the Admiralty. Seal had served as Principal Private Secretary to Duff Cooper and James Stanhope, 7th Earl Stanhope in their respective roles as First Lord of the Admiralty.

On the 3 September 1939 whilst in the First Sea Lord's office shortly after 11'o'clock when the ultimatum sent to the Germans was unanswered, Seal bowed to Ethel Goodenough and said "Miss Goodenough, I have the honour to tell you that we are at war".

Within the eight months that Churchill served as First Lord of the Admiralty, Seal proved himself to be invaluable, to the extent that just weeks into Churchill’s role of Prime minister, the 1st Earl Alexander of Hillsborough was instructed to release Seal from his daily duties, and transfer him for an extended period to Downing Street to serve as Principal Private Secretary to the Prime minister. In this role, he became Churchill’s trusted advisor on public affairs. Seal had the ability to get to the bottom of the subject matter and has been described as Churchill’s ferret.

As Churchill’s Principal Private Secretary, Seal was present at the most important strategic conferences of the early war period, and the making of key political decisions affecting the United Kingdom, such as the Attack on Mers-el-Kébir and the Battle of Britain. According to Seal:

“Churchill was convinced that the Americans were impressed by ruthlessness in dealing with a ruthless foe; and in his mind the American reaction to our attack on the French fleet in Oran was of the first importance".

On 4 July 1940, Franklin D. Roosevelt told the French ambassador that he would have done the same. Jean Lacouture, in a biography of Charles De Gaulle, blamed the tragedy mainly on miscommunication. Other aides during this period included Jock Colville, John Peck, Leslie Rowan, Patrick Kinna and Elizabeth Nel.

Seal, in a letter to Arthur Marder, as Principal Private Secretary to the Prime Minister, described himself as "a sole survivor" from Churchill’s previous incarnation, as First Lord of the Admiralty (1939–1940). John Gerald Lang, a very able and clear headed civil servant in charge of the Admiralty War Registry, described Seal during the Norwegian campaign as "an able man" and "a very assured person and apt to be certain of the rightness of his view".

The Churchill Archives Centre (CAC) holds a number boxes of his official work papers (from between 1939 and 1955) that cover a wide range of subject matter; from the questionable sympathies of Axel Wenner-Gren and Edward VIII, to the design of an air raid shelter at Chartwell House, Churchill’s weekend residence in Kent; to when he was released for "special duties in the Admiralty" during May 1941, and was replaced by John Martin. These new “special duties” were highly strategic and related to the future Lend-Lease agreement, which was by now crucial to the security of the United Kingdom. Churchill appointed him as Deputy Secretary of the Admiralty for North America to secure an agreement with the United States. Although his work papers are now part of the Churchill Archives, some of his records, including correspondence with Churchill’s prime scientific adviser Frederick Lindemann, 1st Viscount Cherwell during 1945, form part of the National Archives. Personal papers from the time he was a Private Secretary have been made readily available to historians by his family.

Seal continued to be a significant influence upon Churchill’s own writings; particularly in any references to Julius Caesar.

After 1945, Seal held a number of senior civil service roles, such as Chief of Trade and Industries, replacing Percy Mills, 1st Viscount Mills, where he headed various collaborative events with the United States, Russia and France; notable for being a career civil servant leading the British Delegation. In 1947 he was physically described by the United States Department of War as wearing glasses, being of medium build and a pipe smoker. During this period he was Vice President of the economic sub-commission on roads and railways Germany (British Element).

He later became Deputy Parliamentary Under Secretary for State for Germany in the Foreign Office. Thereafter he moved onto the Ministry of Works. He was knighted (KBE) for his services in the 1955 New Year Honours, and retired as a Deputy Director, Ministry of Works in 1959.

His publication on Sir Winston Churchill in 1970 is held within the National Archives.

He is listed in Who was Who. Various sources cite an unpublished autobiography of his life, which provided a personal perspective and a first hand "working level" overview of Churchills inner circle, as well as his experiences during a critical and decisive period of World War II.

== Personal ==
He married Gladys Leadbitter in Epsom, Surrey in 1926. They had three children. A year later he became the brother in law of his colleague, Noel Atherton, through the latter's marriage to Daisy Phyllis Leadbitter, his wife's younger sister.

Seal was active with the Additional Curates Society, an Anglican devotion society whilst living at his home “Seaforth”, located at Woodfield Lane, Ashtead on Surrey.

Seal died in West Itchenor, Chichester, Sussex on 31 March 1972 at the age of 73. His obituary was published in The Times. His wife died on 20 June 1978.

== Legacy ==
A keen yachtsman, in 1956, Seal facilitated the purchase of the first Civil Service Sailing Association sailing yacht. The "Melanie", a 42’ yacht was built in 1919 by the Abeking & Rasmussen shipyard. Seal and his colleagues restored the yacht. In the 1970s, Seal left his part share in the “Melanie” to Peter Townrow; his final wishes being to keep the vessel in a good state of repair, in order to continue the tradition of utilising the vessel to promote sailing to the underprivileged.

He was nominated as the Civil Service Sailing Association’s First Commodore, officially opening the club on 22 June 1958.

He was a sizeable monetary contributor to the Civil Service and Post Office Life Boat Fund in aid of the Royal National Lifeboat Institution. A Civil Service lifeboat #36 was named “The Eric Seal”, in his honour and stationed at Eyemouth in the Scottish Borders. The lifeboat was officially named by his wife, Lady Seal on 3 August 1973.

Government offices
Preceded by Arthur Rucker	Principal Private Secretary to the Prime Minister; 1940–1941	Succeeded by John Martin
