= Patrick Gower (disambiguation) =

Patrick Gower (born 1976/1977) is a New Zealand journalist and the former editor of Newshub.

Patrick Gower or Patrick Gowers may also refer to:

- Patrick Gower (civil servant) (1887–1964), who served as the Principal Private Secretary to the Prime Minister of the Kingdom
- Patrick Gowers (1936–2014), an English composer
