= Derek Mitchell =

Derek Mitchell may refer to:

- Derek J. Mitchell, American diplomat
- Derek Mitchell (cricketer)
- Derek Mitchell (civil servant)
