= 1945 Prime Minister's Resignation Honours =

British government recognitions

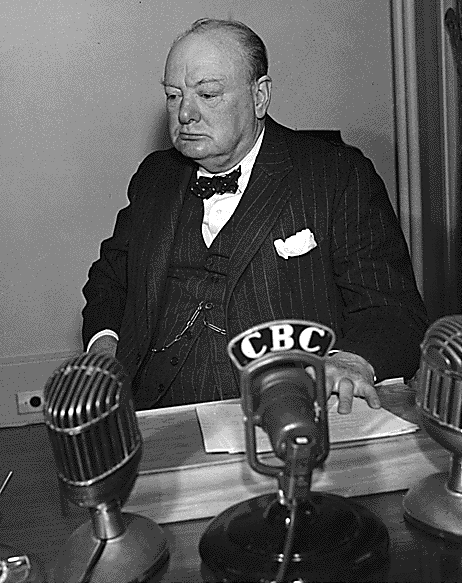
Winston Churchill in 1943

The 1945 Prime Minister's Resignation Honours were announced on 14 August 1945 to mark the resignation of the prime minister, Winston Churchill, following the success of the Labour Party in the 1945 General Election.

The list was particularly notable for four recommendations outside party politics which had the approval of the new prime minister, Clement Attlee. These were to the Chiefs of Staff of the armed services and the Ministry of Defence in World War II, honouring what The Times called "the most remarkable achievement of team work in British military history ... followed with conspicuous mastery to its consummation in the most absolute of all victories."

Other nominations followed the usual convention of Prime Minister's Resignation Honours, rewarding loyal service to the Conservative Party and political and personal service to the retiring prime minister. Amongst these honours, The Times noted in particular the knighthood for A. P. Herbert, "who has his individual niche in the parliamentary temple as the doughty vindicator of the private member's rights, including not least the right to legislate."

The list included the first awards of the newly inaugurated Defence Medal, intended to honour members of the Home Guard, Civil Defence, and troops serving in non-operational areas. However, these four awards were to people who went with Churchill into operational areas, and were noted as being in a special category.

The recipients are displayed below as they were styled before their new honour.

== Defence List ==
=== Baron ===
- Field Marshal Sir Alan Brooke, Chief of the Imperial General Staff since 1941
- Admiral of the Fleet Sir Andrew Cunningham, First Sea Lord and Chief of the Naval Staff since 1943
- Marshal of the Royal Air Force Sir Charles Portal, Chief of the Air Staff since 1940

=== Companion of Honour ===
- General Sir Hastings Ismay, Chief of Staff to the Minister of Defence since 1940

=== KBE ===
- Major General Millis Jefferis, for original work in connection with the development of special war weapons

=== CBE ===
- Colonel Kenneth Grant Post, for work in connection with defence against the V weapons

=== Knighthood ===
- Captain Richard Pim, RNVR, lately supervisor of the Defence Map Room and head of the Upper War Room, Admiralty

== Private Office List ==
=== Baronet ===
- George Watt, MP, Parliamentary Private Secretary to Winston Churchill

=== CB ===
- John Miller Martin, Principal Private Secretary to Winston Churchill

=== CMG ===
- Commander Charles Ralfe Thompson, RN, Personal Assistant to Winston Churchill

=== CBE ===
- George Donald Alastair MacDougall, Chief Assistant, Prime Minister's Statistical Branch

=== OBE ===
- Thomas Wilson, Assistant, Prime Minister's Statistical Branch

=== MBE ===
- Patrick Francis Kinna
- Sheila Allison Minto

=== Defence Medal ===
- Marian Lumley-Holmes; Elizabeth Shakespear Layton; Frank Sawyers; Nina Edith Sturdee

== Political and Public Services List ==
=== Viscount ===
- Gomer Kemsley, 1st Baron Kemsley, newspaper proprietor
- Frederick Penny, 1st Baron Marchwood, treasurer of the Conservative Party

=== Baron ===
- Sir George Broadbridge, MP
- Sir William Davison, MP
- John Llewellin, MP
- Sir Charles Lyle, Bt, MP

=== Privy Councillor ===
- Sir Cuthbert Headlam, Bt, MP
- Malcolm McCorquodale, MP

=== Baronet ===
- Ralph Cokayne Assheton, "For public services in Lancashire over a period of fifty years" [He was the father of Ralph Assheton MP, Chairman of the Conservative Party]
- Harold Paton Mitchell, MP, Vice-Chairman of the Conservative Party
- Walter Womersley, MP
- Arthur Stewart Leslie Young, MP

=== Knight ===
- Robert Cary, MP
- Alan Patrick Herbert, MP
- David Robertson, MP
- Brigadier-General Edward Pius Arthur Riddell CMG DSO
- Basil Neven-Spence, MP

=== Order of the Companions of Honour ===
- Rt Hon Leopold Stennett Amery, MP, Secretary of State for India and Burma
- Rt Hon Alfred Ernest Brown, MP
