= 1923 Prime Minister's Resignation Honours =

British government recognitions

The 1923 Prime Minister's Resignation Honours were a set of honours gazetted on 25 May 1923, five days after Bonar Law's resignation as Prime Minister of the United Kingdom. At the time Bonar Law was seriously ill with cancer of the throat, and his honours list included two physicians who were involved in his care: Sir Thomas Horder and Dr Gould May.

The honours list was comparatively short; in addition to the above two physicians there were just four recipients: his private secretary, his parliamentary private secretary and his two principal private secretaries.

== Baronet ==
- Sir Thomas Jeeves Horder FRCP

== Knight ==
- Chichester Gould May, Esq., MRCP

== Order of the Bath ==
=== Knight Commander of the Order of the Bath (KCB) ===
- Lieutenant-colonel Ronald Dockray Waterhouse CB CMG CVO

=== Companion of the Order of the Bath (CB) ===
- Geoffrey Storrs Fry, Esq.

== Order of the Companions of Honour ==
- John Colin Campbell Davidson, Esq., CB MP

== Royal Victorian Order ==
=== Commander of the Royal Victorian Order (CVO) ===
- Robert Patrick Malcolm Gower, Esq., CB
