= Osmund Somers Cleverly =

British civil servant and private secretary to Neville Chamberlain

Sir Osmond Cleverly CB CVO
- Sir Osmund Somers Cleverly in 1951

Principal Private Secretary to the Prime Minister
- In office 1935–1939 Serving with Sir Harold Vincent during 1935–1936
- Prime Minister: Stanley Baldwin; Neville Chamberlain
- Preceded by: Sir Harold Vincent
- Succeeded by: Arthur Rucker

Personal details
- Born: Osmond Somers Cleverly; 25 October 1891 London
- Died: 21 October 1966 (aged 74) Gomshall, Surrey
- Spouse: Priscilla Simpson (m. 1920)
- Relations: Charles St George Cleverly
- Children: 3
- Education: Rugby School
- Alma mater: Magdalen College, Oxford
- Occupation: Civil servant
- Awards: CVO (1937); CB (1939); Knight Bachelor (1951)

Military service
- Allegiance: United Kingdom
- Branch/service: British Army
- Years of service: 1914–1919
- Rank: Captain
- Unit: Queen's Regiment (TF)
- Battles/wars: First World War

Sir Osmund Somers Cleverly CB CVO (25 October 1891 – 21 October 1966) was a British civil servant who, between 1935 and 1939, served as Principal Private Secretary to the Prime Minister.

== Early life ==
Osmund Cleverly was born in 1891 at London to artist, Charles Frederick Moore Cleverly and Mary Isabel Cleverly. His baptism is recorded as having taken place on 10 December 1891 in the parish of St. Mary the Virgin. For his schooling he was educated at Rugby School and Magdalen College, Oxford. Following the outbreak of the First World War he saw active service in India and Mesopotamia between 1914 and 1919.

== Career ==
=== War Office ===
After the war he entered the British Civil Service, where he worked at the War Office between 1919 and 1935.

=== Principal Private Secretary ===
In 1935 he was appointed Private Secretary and then Principal Private Secretary to the Prime Minister. In this capacity he served the British Prime Ministers Stanley Baldwin and Neville Chamberlain between 1935 and 1939.

=== Ministry of Supply ===
He served as Deputy Secretary in the Ministry of Supply in the early years of the Second World War between 1939 and 1941.

=== Commissioner of Crown Lands ===
From 1941 to 1952 he was Commissioner of Crown Lands and was called out of retirement to fill the role between 1954 and 1955 after the Crichel Down Affair.

== Personal life ==
Cleverly married Priscilla Simpson, daughter of Prof. Frederick Moore Simpson FRIBA, in 1920 with whom he had two sons and a daughter. He was appointed Commander of the Royal Victorian Order (CVO) in the 1937 Coronation Honours, Companion of the Order of the Bath (CB) in the King's Birthday Honours 1939, and Knighted in The King's Birthday Honours 1951.

He died on 21 October 1966 with his funeral held at St. James's Church in Shere, Surrey.

== In fiction ==
Cleverly appears as Prime Minister Chamberlain's PPS throughout the 2017 novel Munich by Robert Harris.

Government offices
Preceded by Sir Harold Vincent	Principal Private Secretary to the Prime Minister; 1935–1939 alongside Sir Harold Vincent in 1935–1936	Succeeded by Arthur Rucker
