= Ronald Waterhouse =

Ronald Waterhouse may refer to:

- Ronald Waterhouse (judge) (1926–2011), judge of the High Court of England and Wales
- Ronald Waterhouse (civil servant) (1878–1942), British Army and Air Force officer and private secretary
