= Anthony Montague Browne =

British diplomat (1923–2013)

Sir Anthony Montague Browne KCMG CBE DFC
- Born: Anthony Arthur Duncan Montague Browne; 8 May 1923; England
- Died: 1 April 2013 (aged 89); Bucklebury, Berkshire, England
- Education: Stowe School
- Alma mater: Magdalen College, Oxford
- Occupation: Diplomat
- Known for: Private secretary to Sir Winston Churchill
- Children: 2, including Justin Welby

Sir Anthony Arthur Duncan Montague Browne KCMG CBE DFC (8 May 1923 – 1 April 2013) was a British diplomat who was private secretary to Sir Winston Churchill during the last ten years of the latter's life.

Montague Browne was the biological father of Justin Welby, the 105th Archbishop of Canterbury, but Welby learned that only after paternity testing had been taken after Montague Browne's death.

== Early life ==
Montague Browne was the son of Andrew Duncan Montague Browne (1878–1969), a British army colonel, by his marriage to Violet Evelyn Downes (1883–1969). He was educated in Switzerland and then at Stowe School, where he refused to join the Officers' Training Corps until World War II had broken out in September 1939.

== Second World War RAF service ==
In September 1941, Montague Browne went up to Magdalen College, Oxford, but left in spring 1942 to join the Royal Air Force. After learning to fly in a de Havilland Tiger Moth with No. 9 Elementary Flying Training School at RAF Ansty near Coventry, he was sent to train in the United States via Canada. He graduated as a fighter pilot with the US Navy pilots school and returned to the UK to train to fly the Bristol Beaufighter with the RAF. After assignment to squadrons flying in Egypt, Palestine and Cyprus, he was assigned to 211 Squadron RAF at Chiringa in Arakan, on the Burma-Bengal border. In 1945 he was awarded the Distinguished Flying Cross for his skill and valour attacking Imperial Japanese Army lines of communication within occupied Burma. In May 1945, he was promoted a flight lieutenant.

== Foreign Office ==
After returning to Magdalen College, Oxford, for a year, Montague Browne entered the Foreign Office in 1946. His first post was as private secretary to the then Permanent Under-Secretary of State for Foreign Affairs, Sir Orme "Moley" Sargent. After a period as the Foreign Office resident clerk (the political night duty officer), he was assigned to the Western Union Secretariat, which led the UK drafting of the North Atlantic Treaty.

In November 1949 he was posted to the British Embassy in Paris, France, partly because of his knowledge of French, which was developed during his schooling in Switzerland. Montague Browne was second secretary in the Chancery (political section), responsible for monitoring North Africa, covering Egypt to Tangier. With the French sceptical of Anglo-American intentions in North Africa and French internal politics then dominated with the rise in electoral power of the French Communist Party, Montague Browne was chosen by the British Ambassador to France, Sir Oliver Harvey, to do the internal political reporting of French concerns.

== Churchill's private secretary ==
In September 1952, Montague Browne was chosen to be Private Secretary for Foreign Affairs to the Prime Minister, Winston Churchill. Until 1955, the role was undertaken jointly with Jock Colville. When Churchill retired in 1955, Montague Browne briefly returned to the Foreign Office but in the same year was seconded to continue as Churchill's private secretary. He stayed with Churchill for the rest of Churchill's life. At first, Churchill was doubtful of him and observed, "I dare say we will get on very well together". As well as his duties as a chief of staff, Montague Browne lunched and dined with Churchill and provided an opponent for his favourite card game, rubicon (six pack bezique). He also accompanied Churchill on his trips abroad. After Churchill's fall in Monaco in June 1962 when he broke his hip, Montague Browne arranged and accompanied him on the RAF flight back to London to assure, as Churchill wished, that if he died, he would die in England. In 1965, on Churchill's death on 24 January, Montague Brown witnessed Churchill's death certificate and liaised between his family and the government regarding Churchill's funeral arrangements.

== Post-Churchill ==
After Churchill's death, Montague Browne was seconded to the Royal Household (1965–67). He then worked for companies in the City of London, including International Life Insurance and Gerrard and National. He also served as a trustee of the Winston Churchill Memorial Trust in the UK.

In 1988 he made an extended appearance on the television discussion programme After Dark alongside among others David Irving, Lord Hailsham and Jack Jones. The topic under discussion was "Winston Churchill: Hero or Madman". It was stated in the programme introduction that it was the first time that Montague Browne had "spoken at length about Winston Churchill" in public.

Montague Browne's memoir of his time with Churchill, published originally in 1995, offered further affectionate, if carefully discreet, insights into the statesman's final years.

== Personal life ==
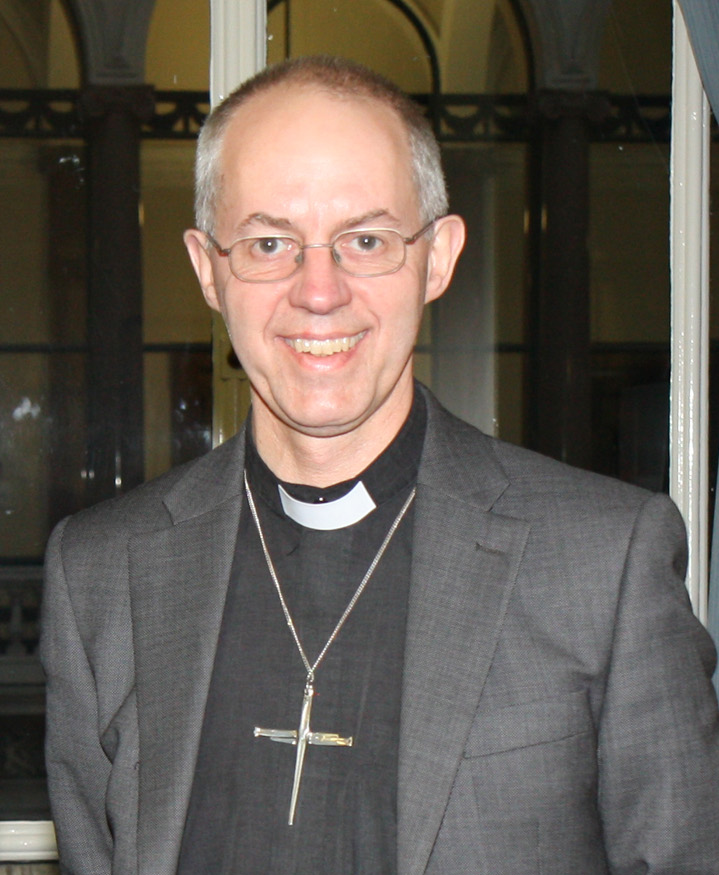
Justin Welby, Former Archbishop of Canterbury and biological son of Anthony Montague Browne

Montague Browne married twice. His first marriage, in 1950 (dissolved 1970), took place in Cheltenham and was to Noel "Nonie" Arnold-Wallinger. He had one daughter from his first marriage. He married secondly, towards the end of 1970 in Wandsworth, Shelagh Macklin (née Mulligan), the former wife of racing driver Lance Macklin.

While working for Churchill, Montague Browne had an affair with Jane Gillian Portal (1929−2023), one of Churchill's personal secretaries, from 1949 until her marriage to Gavin Welby on 4 April 1955 (Jane Portal later married Charles Williams). In 2016, DNA tests showed he was the biological father of her son, Justin Welby, the former Archbishop of Canterbury, who was born on 6 January 1956.

Montague Browne died at his home in Bucklebury, West Berkshire, on 1 April 2013. A memorial service was held on 25 June 2013 at St Clement Danes Church on the Strand, London.

== Ancestry ==
Montague Browne and Portal were 9th cousins once removed, both descending from John Erskine, Earl of Mar (1558–1634): Sir Anthony, by his second wife, Lady Mary Stewart (daughter of Esmé Stewart, 1st Duke of Lennox), and Jane, by his first wife, Anne Drummond.

They were also 11th cousins twice removed, by their shared descent from James V of Scotland: Sir Anthony by the king's mistress, Euphemia Elphinstone, and Jane by his second wife, Mary of Guise.

In a personal statement released by Justin Welby in 2024 it was revealed that Montague Browne's great-great-grandfather, Sir James Fergusson, 4th Baronet (1765−1838), owned slaves on his plantation in Jamaica and received compensation from the British Government in 1837 following the abolition of slavery.

James V of Scotland	Euphemia Elphinstone
Robert Stewart, 1st Earl of Orkney	Lady Janet Kennedy daughter of Gilbert Kennedy, 3rd Earl of Cassilis
Lady Mary Stewart	Patrick Gray, 6th Lord Gray
Jane Gray (d. 1640)	John Wemyss, 1st Earl of Wemyss
David Wemyss, 2nd Earl of Wemyss	Anna Balfour (d. 1649) daughter of Robert Balfour, 2nd Lord Balfour of Burleigh
Lady Jean Wemyss (1629–1715)	George Gordon, 15th Earl of Sutherland
John Gordon, 16th Earl of Sutherland	Helen Cochrane granddaughter of William Cochrane, 1st Earl of Dundonald
Lady Jean Gordon (d. 1747)	James Maitland, Viscount Maitland (d. 1709) son of John Maitland, 5th Earl of Lauderdale
Jane Maitland (1703–1766)	Sir James Fergusson, 2nd Bt. (d.1759)
Charles Fergusson (1740–1804)	Anne Fordyce (d. 1782)
Sir James Fergusson, 4th Bt. (1765–1838)	Henrietta Duncan (1782–1850) daughter of Adam Duncan, 1st Viscount Duncan
Lt.-Col. James Duncan Alexander Fergusson (1812–1864)	Margaret Hope (d. 1896)
Alice Jane Fergusson (d. 1928)	Maj.-Gen. Andrew Smythe Montague Browne (1836–1916)
Andrew Duncan Montague Browne (1878–1969)	Violet Evelyn Downes (1883–1969)
Sir Anthony Montague Browne (1923–2013)

== Honours ==
Montague Browne was appointed OBE in the Queen's Birthday Honours of 1955 after Churchill's retirement, CBE in 1965 after Churchill's death, and knighted KCMG in 2000 "for long and distinguished public service".

== Publications ==
- Montague Browne, Anthony (1995). Long Sunset: Memoirs of Winston Churchill's Last Private Secretary. London: Cassell & Co. Ltd. ISBN 978-0-304-34478-9. OCLC 32547047.

== References and sources ==
Sources

- MONTAGUE BROWNE, Sir Anthony (Arthur Duncan), Who Was Who, A & C Black, 1920–2007; online edn, Oxford University Press, Dec 2013

Diplomatic posts
Preceded by Sir David Hunt	Private Secretary for Foreign Affairs to the Prime Minister; 1952–1955	Succeeded by Guy Millard and Sir Philip de Zulueta
