= Assistant Secretary to the Treasury =

Assistant Secretary to the Treasury may refer to:

- A position in British civil service that was renamed Permanent Secretary to the Treasury in 1867
- A position created by the First Congress of the United States whose duties are now overseen by the Deputy Secretary of the Treasury
