= 1951 Prime Minister's Resignation Honours =

British government recognitions

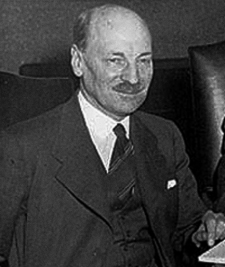
Clement Attlee in 1945

The 1951 Prime Minister's Resignation Honours were officially announced in a supplement to The London Gazette of 27 November 1951, published on 30 November 1951, to mark the resignation of the Prime Minister, Clement Attlee.

== Earl ==
- William Jowitt, 1st Viscount Jowitt, Lord Chancellor

== Baron ==
- David Kirkwood, MP
- George Mathers, PC, MP
- James Milner, MP
- Frederick Wise, MP

== Privy Councillor ==
- Arthur Bottomley, MP
- Douglas Jay, MP
- Lord Shepherd, Chief Whip
- Robert Taylor, MP

== Companion of Honour ==
- Herbert Morrison, Secretary of State for Foreign Affairs

== Knight Bachelor ==
- Walter Hannay, physician

== Companion of the Order of the Bath ==
- Denis Rickett, PPS

== Commander of the Order of the British Empire ==
- Carol Alfred Johnson, Secretary of the PLP
- Arthur Moyle, MP
- Ernest Popplewell, MP

== Officer of the Order of the British Empire ==
- Edward Cass, Private Secretary to the Prime Minister since 1949
