= Christopher Eastwood =

British civil servant (1905–1983)

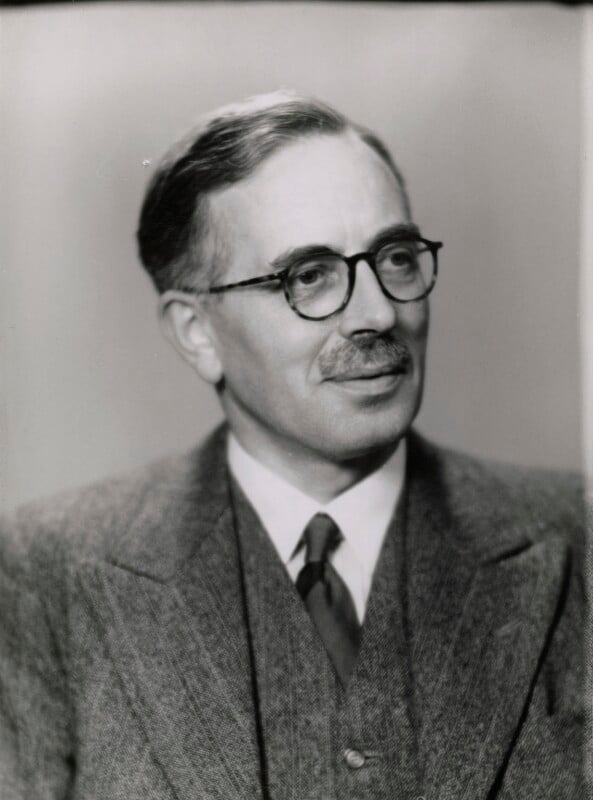
Eastwood in 1946

Christopher Gilbert Eastwood CMG (21 April 1905 – 14 October 1983) was a member of the British civil service.

He was educated at Eton College, then studied at Trinity College, Oxford before joining the civil service in 1927, in the Colonial Office. He served as Private Secretary to the High Commissioner for Palestine between 1932 and 1934, and was then the Secretary of the International Rubber Regulation Committee. He was Private Secretary to George Lloyd, 1st Baron Lloyd and Walter Guinness, 1st Baron Moyne, who were successively Secretary of State for the Colonies (1940–41). He was Principal Assistant Secretary at the Cabinet Office from 1945 and 1947.

Eastwood was appointed a Companion of the Order of St Michael and St George (CMG) in 1947.

Between 1947 and 1952, and again between 1954 and 1966, he was Assistant Under-Secretary of State at the Colonial Office; between 1952 and 1954, he was the Commissioner of Crown Lands. He was a member of the Council of Keble College, Oxford between 1937 and 1952, when the Council was dissolved.
