= Private Secretary for Foreign Affairs to the Prime Minister =

The private secretary to the prime minister for foreign affairs is a senior official in the British Civil Service who acts as the private secretary for all matters concerning foreign policy and international affairs to the prime minister of the United Kingdom. The holder of this post has traditionally been a member of His Majesty's Diplomatic Service on secondment to the Cabinet Office, and reports directly to the principal private secretary to the prime minister.

== List of private secretaries to the prime minister for foreign affairs ==
- 1950–1952: David Hunt
- 1952–1955: Anthony Montague Browne
- 1955–1957: Guy Millard
- 1957–1963: Sir Philip de Zulueta
- 1963–1966: Oliver Wright
- 1966–1969: Michael Palliser
- 1969–1970: Edward Youde
- 1970–1972: Peter Moon
- 1972–1974: Thomas Bridges, 2nd Baron Bridges
- 1974–1977: Patrick Wright
- 1977–1979: Bryan Cartledge
- 1979–1981: Michael Alexander
- 1981–1984: John Coles
- 1984–1991: Sir Charles Powell
- 1991–1993: Stephen Wall
- 1993–1996: Roderic Lyne
- 1996–1999: Sir John Holmes
- 1999–2001: John Sawers
- 2001–2003: Francis Campbell
- 2002–2004: Matthew Rycroft
- 2004–2007: Antony Phillipson
- 2007-2007: Matthew Gould
- 2007–2011: Thomas Fletcher
- 2011–2014: John Casson
- 2014–2016: Nigel Casey
- 2016–2019: Jonny Hall
- 2024–present: Ailsa Terry

== See also ==
- Prime Minister's Office
- Principal Private Secretary to the Secretary of State for Foreign and Commonwealth Affairs
