= Arthur Rucker (civil servant) =

British civil servant (born 1895)

Sir Arthur Rucker KCMG CB CBE
- Sir Arthur Nevil Rucker in 1944

Principal Private Secretary to the Prime Minister
- In office 1939–1940
- Prime Minister: Neville Chamberlain
- Preceded by: Osmund Somers Cleverly
- Succeeded by: Eric Seal

Personal details
- Born: Arthur Nevil Rucker; 20 June 1895
- Died: 12 July 1991 (aged 96)
- Spouse: Elsie Marion Broadbent (m. 1922–1991)
- Relations: Sir Arthur Rucker FRS (father)
- Children: 4
- Education: Marlborough College
- Alma mater: Trinity College, Cambridge
- Awards: CBE (1937); CB (1941); KCMG (1942)

Military service
- Allegiance: United Kingdom
- Branch/service: British Army
- Years of service: 1914–1918
- Rank: Second lieutenant
- Unit: 12th battalion, Suffolk Regiment
- Battles/wars: First World War

Arthur Nevil Rucker, KCMG CB CBE (20 June 1895 – 12 July 1991), was a former British civil servant who served as Neville Chamberlain's Principal Private Secretary (PPS) from the period 1939 to 1940.

== Early life ==
Arthur Nevil Rucker was born on 20 June 1895. The son of Sir Arthur Rucker FRS, a leading physicist and Principal of London University, he was always referred to as Nevil by his family to avoid confusion. After studying at Marlborough College he matriculated to Trinity College, Cambridge, where his studies were interrupted by the outbreak of the First World War. Subsequently commissioned into the 12th battalion of the Suffolk Regiment, he gained the rank of second lieutenant during his time in service. In 1915 he was posted to France where he was injured in battle. After the war he returned to Cambridge to complete his degree and joined the civil service in 1920.

== Career ==
Sir Arthur Rucker's career began at the Ministry of Health in 1920 as an assistant principal. He rose to become Neville Chamberlain's Principal Private Secretary at the outbreak of the Second World War (1939–1940). After a period working for Nye Bevin, in 1948, he left the both civil service and Britain to take up the post of deputy director-general of the International Refugee Organisation in Geneva.

Rucker was appointed Commander of the Order of the British Empire (CBE) in the 1937 New Year Honours list, Companion of the Order of the Bath (CB) in the 1941 New Year Honours list and knighted (KCMG) in The King's Birthday Honours of 1942.

== Personal life ==
In 1922 Sir Arthur married Elsie Marion Broadbent and they remained wedded until she died just one month before him. The union produced two sons and two daughters.

Government offices
Preceded by Osmund Somers Cleverly	Principal Private Secretary to the Prime Minister; 1939–1940	Succeeded by Eric Seal
