= Denis Rickett =

British civil servant

Sir Denis Rickett KCMG CB
- Sir Denis Rickett in 1960

Principal Private Secretary to the Prime Minister
- In office 1950–1951
- Prime Minister: Clement Attleee
- Preceded by: Laurence Helsby
- Succeeded by: David Pitblado

Personal details
- Born: Denis Hubert Fletcher Rickett; 27 July 1907
- Died: 26 February 1997 (aged 89)
- Spouse: Ruth Armstrong (m. 1946)
- Children: 3
- Education: Rugby School
- Alma mater: Balliol College, Oxford
- Occupation: International Finance
- Awards: CMG (1947); CB (1951); KCMG (1956)

Sir Denis Hubert Fletcher Rickett, KCMG CB (27 July 1907 – 26 February 1997), was a British civil servant who served as Clement Attlee's Principal Private Secretary (PPS) from 1950 to 1951 and as vice-president of the World Bank from 1968 until 1974.

== Early life ==
Denis Hubert Fletcher Rickett was born on 27 July 1907, to the family of the owners of the coal merchants firm of Rickett & Cockerell, which through mergers and acquisitions became the eventual owners of the Falkland Islands Company. After studying at Rugby School he matriculated to Balliol College, Oxford graduating in 1929. Although he went on to win a prize fellowship to All Souls College, Oxford he chose to leave academia and instead join the civil service.

== Career ==
Sir Denis Rickett's career began at the Economic Advisory Council in 1931. He rose through the ranks to become Clement Attlee's Principal Private Secretary during 1950–1951. After various roles in the Treasury and Whitehall, he left to become vice-president of the International Bank for Reconstruction and Development in Washington, then under the leadership of Robert McNamara, a position he enjoyed from 1968 to 1974.

Rickett was appointed Companion of the Order of St Michael and St George (CMG) in the 1947 King's Birthday Honours, Companion of the Order of the Bath (CB) in the 1951 Prime Minister's Resignation Honours and knighted (KCMG) in the Queen's Birthday Honours 1956.

== Personal life ==
Denis Rickett was personally wealthy owning his own Rolls-Royce. He was also a talented amateur pianist. In 1946 Sir Denis married Ruth Armstrong, a doctor. He had three children, two sons and a daughter.

Government offices
Preceded by Laurence Helsby	Principal Private Secretary to the Prime Minister; 1950–1951	Succeeded by David Pitblado
