= Guy Millard =

British diplomat

Sir Guy Elwin Millard KCMG CVO (22 January 1917 – 26 April 2013) was a British diplomat who was closely involved in the Suez crisis, and afterwards ambassador to Hungary, Sweden and Italy.

== Career ==
Guy Elwin Millard was educated at Wixenford, Charterhouse, and Pembroke College, Cambridge. He entered the Diplomatic Service in 1939, but served in the Royal Navy during the Second World War.

Millard was a junior secretary to Anthony Eden during the war, and when Eden became Prime Minister in 1955 he arranged for Millard to be seconded from the Foreign Office to be his Private Secretary for Foreign Affairs. He was thus closely involved with the Suez Crisis in 1956. Afterwards he wrote a detailed history of the episode, an edited version of which remains in the National Archives.

Millard was Ambassador to Hungary 1967–69, Minister in Washington, D.C., 1970–71, Ambassador to Sweden 1971–74 and Ambassador to Italy 1974–76. After retiring from the Diplomatic Service, he served as chairman of the British-Italian Society 1977–83.

Millard was appointed a Companion of the Order of St Michael and St George (CMG) in the 1957 New Year Honours and a Companion of the Royal Victorian Order (CVO) in 1961 on the occasion of a state visit by Queen Elizabeth II to Iran, where Millard was stationed at the time. He was promoted to Knight Commander of the Order of St Michael and St George (KCMG)) in the 1972 New Year Honours. The Italian government made him a Grand Officer of the Order of Merit in 1981.

Diplomatic posts
Preceded by Anthony Montague Browne	Private Secretary for Foreign Affairs to the Prime Minister; 1955–1957	Succeeded by Sir Philip de Zulueta
Preceded by Sir Alexander Morley	Ambassador Extraordinary and Plenipotentiary at Budapest; 1967–1969	Succeeded by Derek Dodson
Preceded by Sir Moore Crosthwaite	Ambassador Extraordinary and Plenipotentiary at Stockholm; 1971–1974	Succeeded by Sir Samuel Falle
Preceded by Sir Patrick Hancock	Ambassador Extraordinary and Plenipotentiary at Rome; 1974–1976	Succeeded by Sir Alan Campbell
