= David Pitblado =

Sir David Pitblado KCB CVO

Principal Private Secretary to the Prime Minister
- In office 1951–1956 Serving with Jock Colville (1951–1955)
- Prime Minister: Clement Attlee; Winston Churchill; Anthony Eden
- Preceded by: Denis Rickett
- Succeeded by: Frederick Bishop

Personal details
- Born: David Bruce Pitblado; 18 August 1912
- Died: 9 July 1997 (aged 84)
- Spouse: Edith Evans (m. 1941)
- Children: 2
- Education: Strand School
- Alma mater: Emmanuel College, Cambridge
- Occupation: Civil servant
- Awards: CVO (1953); CB (1955); KCB (1967)

Sir David Bruce Pitblado KCB CVO (18 August 1912 – 9 July 1997) was a principal private secretary to the office of the prime minister of the United Kingdom. Serving from 1951 to 1956, he was associated with prime ministers Clement Attlee, Winston Churchill, and Anthony Eden. With his colleague Jock Colville, he was one of Churchill's last two principal private secretaries at 10 Downing Street.

== Biography ==
David Pitblado, born in London in August 1912, attended Strand School and then matriculated at Emmanuel College, Cambridge. He chose the civil service as a career, and was named assistant private secretary to the Secretary of State for Dominion Affairs in 1937. He joined the War Cabinet Office in 1942, and became an undersecretary for economic planning in the Treasury in 1949. His career trajectory continued and he became the Principal Private Secretary to the Prime Minister, Clement Attlee, in 1951. His service for Attlee was brief, as the Labour prime minister did not retain his majority in the 1951 General Election. Pitblado continued his service to Attlee's replacement, Winston Churchill.

During Churchill's second term, 1951–1955, the Prime Minister (age 77-81) was not always in good health, and the office of Principal Private Secretary became more important than usual, causing a second principal private secretary to be appointed: Pitblado specialised in home and internal affairs, his colleague Jock Colville in defence and external affairs.

Following Churchill's stroke in June 1953, prime-ministerial duties were performed by senior staff for some weeks. Churchill biographer Martin Gilbert credits Pitblado, Colville, and Churchill's son-in-law Christopher Soames with supervising the operation of the office while the incapacitated Prime Minister fought toward partial recovery.

After Churchill's retirement in 1955, Pitblado rounded out his service at No 10 with brief service to his successor, Anthony Eden (later Earl of Avon) in 1955–1956. He then returned to the ministerial civil service and served in a variety of posts. He became Permanent Secretary at the Ministry of Power in 1966–1969, and Permanent Secretary at the Ministry of Technology in 1969–1970. He then served for 5 years as Comptroller and Auditor General in 1971–1976

=== Later life and honours ===
David Pitblado was listed in the 1953 Coronation Honours, receiving the rank of Commander of the Royal Victorian Order. Two years later he was appointed CB (Order of the Bath) in the 1955 Birthday Honours. In his capacity as ministerial Permanent Secretary at the Ministry of Power, he was again honoured in the 1967 New Year Honours with the designation of Knight Commander of the Order of the Bath (KCB).

== Personal life ==
He was married in 1941 to Edith Evans until her death in 1978. The union bore one son and one daughter.

Government offices
Preceded by Denis Rickett	Principal Private Secretary to the Prime Minister; 1951–1956 alongside Jock Colville (1951–1955)	Succeeded by Frederick Bishop
Preceded by Sir Matthew Stevenson	Permanent Secretary, Ministry of Power; 1966–69	Succeeded by Himself (as Permanent Secretary (Industry), Ministry of Technology)
Preceded by Himself (as Permanent Secretary, Ministry of Power)	Permanent Secretary (Industry), Ministry of Technology; 1969–70; With: Sir Richard Clarke (who was overall Permanent Secretary)	Succeeded by Sir Antony Part (as Permanent Secretary, Department of Trade and Industry)
Preceded by none	Second Permanent Secretary of the Civil Service Department; 1970–1971	Succeeded by none Sir Ian Bancroft from 1973
