= Nick Macpherson =

British civil servant

The Right Honourable The Lord Macpherson of Earl's Court GCB
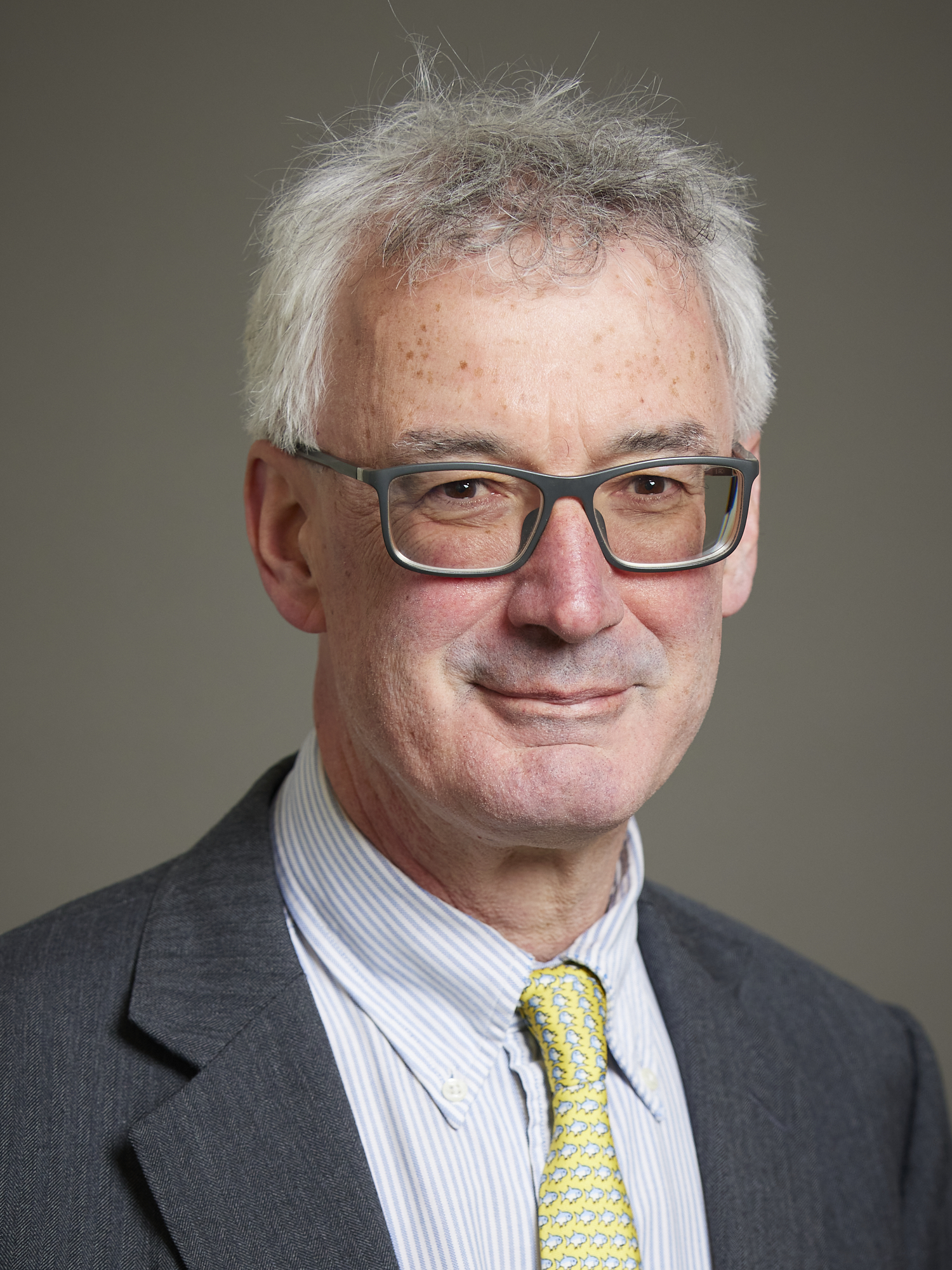
- Official portrait, 2023

Permanent Secretary to the Treasury
- In office 2005–2016
- Chancellor: Gordon Brown; Alistair Darling; George Osborne
- Preceded by: Sir Gus O'Donnell
- Succeeded by: Sir Tom Scholar

Member of the House of Lords
- Lord Temporal
- Life peerage 4 October 2016

Personal details
- Born: 14 July 1959 (age 67)
- Education: Balliol College, Oxford (BA); University College, London (MSc)

Nicholas Ian Macpherson, Baron Macpherson of Earl's Court, GCB (born 14 July 1959) is a former senior British civil servant. He served as the Permanent Secretary to the Treasury from 2005 to 2016.

Macpherson was Permanent Secretary to three Chancellors. He managed the department through the financial and wider economic crisis which began in 2007.

Macpherson was nominated for a crossbench peerage in David Cameron's 2016 resignation Honours, and joined the House of Lords on 4 October 2016.

== Early life ==
Macpherson was educated at Ashdown House and Eton College. He later attended Balliol College, Oxford (where he read Politics and Economics) and University College London.

== Career ==
Macpherson first worked as an economist at the CBI and Peat Marwick Consulting.

=== Treasury ===
Macpherson entered HM Treasury in 1985. From 1993 to 1997, he was Principal Private Secretary to the Chancellor of the Exchequer; he oversaw the transition from Kenneth Clarke to Gordon Brown as Chancellor. From 1998 to 2001, he was Director of Welfare Reform. From 2001 to 2004, he was head of the Public Services Directorate, where he managed the 2000 and 2002 spending reviews. From 2004 to 2005 Macpherson managed the Budget and Public Finance Directorate, where he was responsible for tax policy and the budget process.

Macpherson succeeded Sir Gus O'Donnell as Permanent Secretary of the Treasury, when the latter moved to be the Cabinet Secretary and Head of the Civil Service in 2005. Macpherson came to prominence during the 2014 Scottish independence referendum when he advised George Osborne against entering into a currency union with any Scottish independent state, which was contrary to initial Scottish National Party plans. He stepped down from the Treasury on 31 March 2016.

=== Other positions ===
Macpherson was a visiting fellow at Nuffield College, Oxford, and is a visiting professor at King's College London.

Macpherson is Chairman of C. Hoare & Co and the Scottish American Investment Trust.

== Personal life ==
He is the father of Fred Macpherson, frontman and vocalist of indie rock band Spector.

== Honours ==
Macpherson was appointed Knight Commander of the Order of the Bath (KCB) in the 2009 New Year Honours, and promoted to Knight Grand Cross of the same Order (GCB) in the 2015 Birthday Honours.

Macpherson was nominated for a life peerage in the 2016 Prime Minister's Resignation Honours and was created Baron Macpherson of Earl's Court, of Earl's Court in the Royal Borough of Kensington and Chelsea, on 4 October.

Government offices
Preceded by Sir John Gieve	Managing Director, Public Services; HM Treasury; 2001–2004	Succeeded by Jonathan Stephens
Preceded by Sir Robert Culpin	Managing Director, Budget and Public Finances; HM Treasury; 2004–2005	Succeeded by Mark Neale as Managing Director, Budget, Tax and Welfare
Preceded by Sir Gus O'Donnell	Permanent Secretary of HM Treasury; 2005–2016	Succeeded by Tom Scholar
Orders of precedence in the United Kingdom
Preceded by The Lord Caine	Gentlemen; Baron Macpherson of Earl's Court	Followed by The Lord Ricketts
