= 1963 Prime Minister's Resignation Honours =

British government recognitions

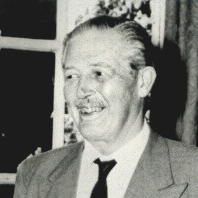
Harold Macmillan in 1957

The 1963 Prime Minister's Resignation Honours were officially announced in the London Gazette of 22 October 1963 and marked the resignation of the Prime Minister, Harold Macmillan.

== Hereditary titles ==
=== Barons ===
- The Honourable John Edward Reginald Wyndham, MBE

=== Baronetcies ===
- Samuel Knox Cunningham, Esq., Q.C., M.P.
- Sidney Harold Evans, Esq., C.M.G., O.B.E.
- Sir John Samuel Richardson, M.V.O., M.D., F.R.C.P.

== Knights Bachelor ==
- Philip Francis de Zulueta, Esq.

== Order of the British Empire ==
=== Knights Commander (KBE) ===
- Timothy James Bligh, Esq., D.S.O., O.B.E., D.S.C.

=== Commanders (CBE) ===
- Philip John Woodfield, Esq.

=== Officers (OBE) ===
- Mrs Ethele Harding.
- Mrs Mabel Maltby.
- Miss Joan Summers.

=== Members (MBE) ===
- Sidney Alfred May, Esq.

== British Empire Medal (BEM) ==
- Miss Edith Baker.
- Mrs Sarah Bell.
- Inspector William Harwood, Metropolitan Police.
- William Housden
