= James Bowler (civil servant) =

Senior British civil servant

James Bowler CB
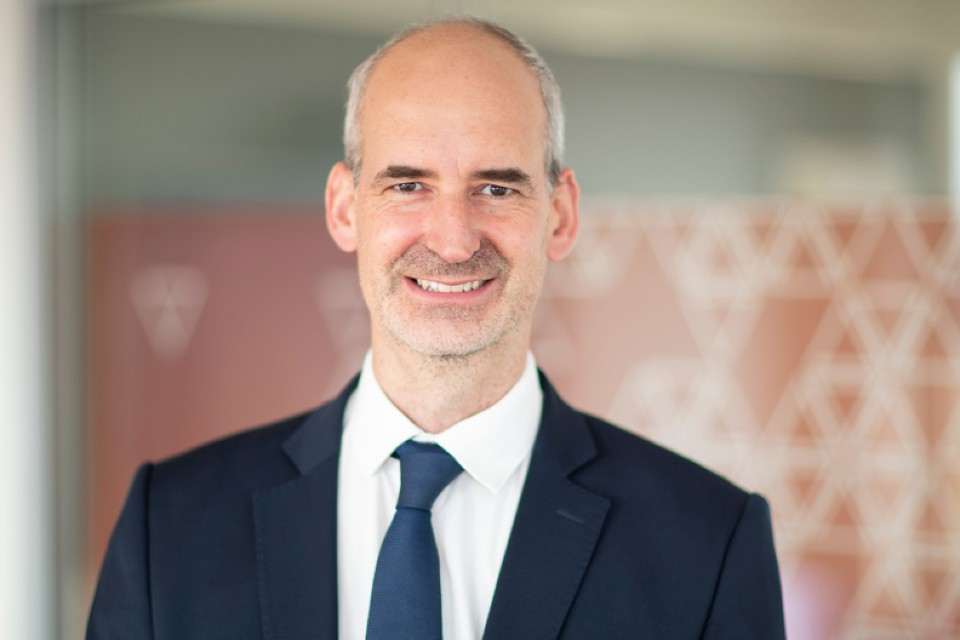

Permanent Secretary to the Treasury
- Incumbent
- Assumed office 10 October 2022
- Chancellor: Kwasi Kwarteng; Jeremy Hunt; Rachel Reeves; John Healey
- Preceded by: Sir Tom Scholar

Department for International Trade Second Permanent Secretary
- In office August 2021 – October 2022
- Prime Minister: Boris Johnson; Liz Truss

Second Permanent Secretary to the Cabinet Office
- In office 9 October 2020 – 24 May 2021
- Prime Minister: Boris Johnson
- Preceded by: Office established
- Succeeded by: Sue Gray

Principal Private Secretary to the Prime Minister
- In office 11 May 2010 – 5 December 2011
- Prime Minister: David Cameron
- Preceded by: Jeremy Heywood
- Succeeded by: Chris Martin

Principal Private Secretary to the Chancellor of the Exchequer
- In office 2005–2007
- Chancellor: Gordon Brown
- Preceded by: Mark Bowman
- Succeeded by: Dan Rosenfield

Personal details
- Born: July 1973 (age 53)
- Education: Cardiff University

James Edward Bowler CB (born July 1973) is a senior British civil servant currently serving as the Permanent Secretary to the Treasury since October 2022 having previously served as permanent secretary to the Department for International Trade since 2021. Before assuming this role, Bowler was the second permanent secretary to the Cabinet Office from 2020 to 2021 where he led the COVID Taskforce for the British Government. He was the Director General for Policy, Communication and Analysis at the Ministry of Justice from March to October 2020. Bowler is currently Trustee of the charity Police Now.

== Education ==
From 1986 until 1991, Bowler was educated at Abingdon School, an all-boys independent school in Abingdon-on-Thames, Oxfordshire. He then attended Cardiff University where he studied Economics.

== Career ==
Prior to March 2020 Bowler worked at Her Majesty's Treasury for eight years, serving the positions of Director General for Public Spending between May 2017 and March 2020, Director General for Tax and Welfare between April 2015 and May 2017 and Director for Strategy, Planning and Budget between January 2012 to April 2015. Bowler was promoted to Director General in April 2015.

In May 2010 when David Cameron became Prime Minister, Bowler was appointed to the post of Principal Private Secretary to the Prime Minister serving until December 2011.

Bowler has also served under Gordon Brown when he was Chancellor of the Exchequer having been appointed as his Principal Private Secretary between 2005 and 2007. Bowler continued to work closely with Brown during his premiership as Prime Minister.

He was appointed Companion of the Order of the Bath (CB) in the 2012 New Year Honours.

In May 2021, it was announced that Bowler would become the new Permanent Secretary to the Department for International Trade.

In October 2022, Bowler was appointed as the new Permanent Secretary to the Treasury.

Following Rishi Sunak's claim during the 2024 general election that Labour's plans would mean £2,000 of tax rises per household. Bowler said the Conservatives' assessment of Labour's tax plans "should not be presented as having been produced by the civil service". Bowler said the calculation of £38bn of uncosted spending used by the Tories "includes costs beyond those provided by the civil service".

In January 2025, the creation of the National Infrastructure and Service Transformation Authority (NISTA) in April 2025 was confirmed, with Bowler named as the body's principal accounting officer.

== See also ==
- List of Old Abingdonians

== Positions held ==
Government offices
New title	Principal Private Secretary to the Chancellor of the Exchequer; 2005–2007	Succeeded by Dan Rosenfield
Preceded by Jeremy Heywood	Principal Private Secretary to the Prime Minister; 2010–2011	Succeeded by Chris Martin
Preceded by Mark Bowman	HM Treasury Director for Strategy, Planning and Budget; 2012–2015	Succeeded by Clare Lombardelli
Preceded by Jeremy Heywood	HM Treasury Director General for Tax and Welfare; 2015–2017	Succeeded by Beth Russell
Preceded by Mark Bowman	HM Treasury Director General for Public Spending; 2017–2020	Succeeded by Cat Little
Preceded by Julian Kelly	Ministry of Justice Director General for Policy, Communication and Analysis; 2020	Succeeded by TBC
Preceded by Mark Sweeney	Cabinet Office Second Permanent Secretary; 2020–2021	Succeeded by Sue Gray
Preceded by Sir Tom Scholar	Permanent Secretary to the Treasury; 2022–	Incumbent
