= John T. Davies (businessman) =

20th-century Welsh businesspeople (1881–1938)

Sir John T. Davies KCB CVO
- Sir John Thomas Davies in 1917

Principal Private Secretary to the Prime Minister
- In office 1916–1922
- Prime Minister: David Lloyd George
- Preceded by: Maurice Bonham-Carter
- Succeeded by: Sir Edward Grigg

Personal details
- Born: John Thomas Davies; 9 May 1881 Carmarthen, Wales
- Died: 31 March 1938 (aged 56) Little Baddow, Essex
- Spouse: Bessie Edwards (m. 1913)
- Relations: Towyn Jones
- Children: Mary Gwenda
- Education: Bangor Normal College, Wales
- Alma mater: University of London
- Occupation: Senior Civil Servant and Company Director
- Awards: CVO; KCB (1922)

Sir John T. Davies KCB CVO (1881–1938), known as J. T. Davies until 1923, served as Lloyd George's Principal Private Secretary (PPS) from 1912 to 1922 and was subsequently a director of both the Suez Canal Company and the Ford Motor Company Limited.

== Early life ==
John Thomas Davies was born in Wales on 9 May 1881. He was one of the five children of John Davies, a farmer from Newcastle Emlyn, Carmarthenshire, and he was a cousin of the Welsh Liberal MP Towyn Jones. As a boy John Thomas wrote poetry in Welsh and won prizes at eisteddfodau. He considered becoming a preacher, but decided on a career in teaching. After studying at Normal College, Bangor he moved to London where he taught for ten years while studying part time for a Bachelor of Science degree at London University. In July 1911 he was on the organising committee for the investiture of the Prince of Wales at Caernarvon, and it was there that he met Lloyd George, then Chancellor of the Exchequer, who offered him a job as one of his secretaries, which was accepted.

== Service with Lloyd George ==
When Lloyd George was appointed to the newly created post of Minister of Munitions 'JT', as he would become known in the political world, moved with him from The Treasury to the new Ministry in May 1915. JT accompanied Lloyd George on a visit to striking munitions workers in Glasgow in December 1915, noting that they were lucky to escape with their lives due to the anger of the shop stewards.

In June 1916 JT moved to the War Ministry with Lloyd George when the latter was appointed Secretary of State for War, and in September of that year he accompanied Lloyd George on a tour of the Western Front, visiting Verdun, the Somme, and Ypres. When Lloyd George became Prime Minister and head of the coalition government in December 1916 JT moved with him to Number 10 Downing Street and served under him until his resignation in October 1922.

During his time at Number 10 JT made several trips abroad with Lloyd George. In November 1917 he attended the Rapallo Conference which had been convened to discuss how Britain and France could help the Italian forces. In May 1918 he became involved in the furore surrounding the Maurice Affair in which Lloyd George was accused of lying to the House of Commons about the number of troops on the Western Front. Lloyd George was exonerated when he was able to prove that the figures he provided had been given to him by General Maurice when the latter was Director of Military Operations. According to Frances Stevenson, who was Lloyd George's mistress and one of his secretaries, she and JT later came across an amendment to the figures and JT put the amendment on the fire, saying that no-one but he and Frances would ever know about it.

When Lloyd George was away from London without JT they kept in touch by telephone, often speaking in Welsh so that any eavesdroppers would not be able to understand. From January to June 1919 JT was a member of Lloyd George's delegation at the Paris Peace Conference, and he also attended the follow-up San Remo Conference which took place in Italy in April 1920. In the late summer of 1921 JT was one of the party who accompanied Lloyd George to Gairloch in Scotland for meetings with representatives of Éamon de Valera concerning Irish Home Rule.

When Lloyd George resigned as Prime Minister in October 1922 JT was made a Knight Commander of the Bath (KCB) and given a seat on the board of the Suez Canal Company. Several publishers invited him to write his memoirs of his time with Lloyd George, but he said that he didn't think that it was right to profit from his position.

== Company Directorships ==
Sir John, as he then became known, served as a director of the Suez Canal Company until his death in 1938. In June 1925 his suitability to be a director of the company was questioned in the House of Commons, as he had no business experience. Winston Churchill, then Chancellor of the Exchequer, explained that the three directors appointed by the British Government, of whom Sir John was one, were chosen for their parliamentary and official knowledge, and that Britain's commercial interests were looked after by the non-official members of the board who were known as the London Committee. In 1937 Sir John and the author Harry Greenwall were commissioned to write the official history of the Suez Canal, though the book remained unpublished at the time of Sir John's death as the Foreign Office did not want certain things which he had written to be made public.

In December 1928 Sir John became one of the four British Directors of the newly formed Ford Motor Company Limited. He was later also involved in Henry Ford's experiments with growing soya beans at the Fordson Estate in Essex. Sir John and Lady Davies purchased a house in East Haddow, Essex to be near Sir John's work at the Fordson Estate.

Sir John was also a director of British Monomarks Limited, a company which provided identification marks for luggage and other items in case they were lost or stolen, and a director of West Coast Residential Estates Limited, a property company developing land in the Porthcawl area of Wales.

== Political Activity ==
After leaving the Civil Service Sir John joined Lloyd George's Liberal Party. He became the senior trustee of Lloyd George's Political Fund, for which he also acted as both secretary and treasurer at different times. The Fund had been set up by Lloyd George using money given by wealthy Liberal donors, often in exchange for honours. After the 1923 General Election Sir John represented Lloyd George in negotiations with Asquith's Liberals concerning the reimbursement of election expenses out of the Fund. In November 1927 he was appointed secretary of the Fund, and as treasurer of the Fund in 1931 he was involved in organising the accommodation when Lloyd George's Liberals moved to new offices at Thames House.

Sir John was an active member of his local branch of the Liberal Party, the Hendon & Finchley Liberal Association, and hosted their summer garden parties in the grounds of his house. He was also a member of the local branch of the League of Nations Union, which had been set up to promote international peace and influenced the foreign policy of the Liberal Party.

== Charity Work ==
Sir John and Lady Davies did much charity work with Dame Henrietta Barnett and the Hampstead Garden Suburb Institute, which was at that time an Adult Education Centre. They held events for the Institute in the grounds of their home, and Sir John was an active member of the institute's Council. Lady Davies was involved with Dame Henrietta's work with the Children's Country Holiday Fund, which organised visits to the countryside for deprived children.

== Death ==
Sir John died at his home The Meadow, Little Baddow, Essex on 31 March 1938. On hearing of his death Lloyd George said 'Sir John Davies was not only my private secretary through the most difficult years of my official life but he was always one of my closest friends. Of his work in Downing Street in the dark days of the War I cannot hope to use adequate terms. He was efficient, steadfast, and loyal in all things. I never found him wanting on a single occasion'.

== Personal life ==
In March 1913 Sir John married Bessie Edwards from Handcross in Sussex. They had one daughter, Mary Gwenda.

Government offices
Preceded by Maurice Bonham-Carter	Principal Private Secretary to the Prime Minister; 1916–1922	Succeeded by Sir Edward Grigg
