= Commissioners of Crown Lands (United Kingdom) =

The Commissioners of Crown Lands were charged with the management of United Kingdom Crown lands. From 1924 to 1954, they discharged the functions previously carried out by the Commissioners of Woods, Forests and Land Revenues. There were three commissioners at any one time: the Minister of Agriculture, the Secretary of State for Scotland and one permanent commissioner.

A cause célèbre in the 1950s caused the management of Crown lands to be scrutinised. Land at Crichel Down in Dorset requisitioned for military purposes was transferred to the Commissioners of Crown Lands when it was no longer required by the army. The previous owners wanted their land back, but the Minister of Agriculture, Thomas Dugdale, was adamant that it should not be returned. A series of reports led to the reconstitution of the management of Crown lands under the Crown Estate Acts of 1956 and 1961, removing the involvement of politicians in their management.

== Permanent commissioners of Crown Lands ==
- 1924 Arthur S. Gaye
- 1934 Charles Launcelot Stocks
- 1941 Osmund Somers Cleverly (later Sir Osmund Cleverly)
- 1952 Christopher Eastwood
- 1954 Sir Osmund Cleverly
