= Michael Halls =

British civil servant (1915–1970)

Arthur Norman Michael Halls MBE TD (6 October 1915 – 3 April 1970), also known as Michael Halls, was a British civil servant who served as Principal Private Secretary to the Prime Minister of the United Kingdom, Harold Wilson, 1966–70.

Former Downing Street Press Secretary Joe Haines described Halls in The Spectator: "He was devious but not too clever by half, as some of his intellectual superiors were. Halls, like most men in power, was fascinated by the press. He wanted to know everything that I was doing."
