= Thomas Wilson (economist) =

British economist

Thomas Wilson OBE FRSE FBA FRSA (23 June 1916 – 27 July 2001) was a 20th-century British economist, who spoke out strongly against the introduction of the poll tax in Britain.

== Life ==
He was born in Belfast on 23 June 1916, the son of John Bright Wilson, an Ulster Protestant, and was educated at the Methodist College in the city. He studied history at Queen's College, Belfast, before switching to economics, then obtained a doctorate (PhD) at the London School of Economics under Evan Durbin and Nicholas Kaldor. Although a socialist and communist-sympathiser, his observations on the Russian delegates at the 1938 World Youth Congress in Poughkeepsie, New York led him to conclude the system as a tyranny.

In the Second World War he worked first for the Ministry of Economic Warfare and Aircraft Production in Whitehall, then became an advisor to Winston Churchill's statistics branch under Lord Cherwell. Desiring more active duties in 1944 he was given leave to join the Merchant Navy and escorted the Mulberry Harbour to Arromanches. He was appointed an OBE in the 1945 Prime Minister's Resignation Honours.

From 1946 to 1958 he was a Fellow of Economics at University College, Oxford, in succession to Harold Wilson.

From 1958 to 1982 he held the Adam Smith Chair in Economy at Glasgow University. From 1963 to 1964 and from 1970 to 1983 he was economic advisor to the Secretary of State for Scotland (ironically to both Tory and Labour). In 1964/65 he was economic advisor to the Northern Ireland government creating the "Wilson Plan".

In 1980 he was elected a Fellow of the Royal Society of Edinburgh. His proposers were Fraser Noble, Thomas Brumby Johnston, Anthony Elliot Ritchie, Neil Campbell and Douglas Grant.

In 1984 he was invited to be an official assessor on the poll tax proposals by Margaret Thatcher. Much to the government's dismay, he was strongly opposed to the concept, but rather than follow his educated opinion he was instead replaced by more sympathetic "experts".

He died at his cottage in Kilmahog near Callander on 27 July 2001. He is buried in the old churchyard at Balquhidder.

== Family ==
In 1943 he married Dorothy Joan Parry (d.1998). She developed multiple sclerosis.

They had a son and two daughters.

== Publications ==
- Fluctuations in Income and Employment (1941)
- Modern Capitalism and Economic Progress. London: Macmillan & Co. Ltd. 1950 – via Internet Archive.
- Skinner, Andrew; Wilson, Thomas, eds. (1975). Essays on Adam Smith. Oxford: Oxford University Press – via Internet Archive.
- Wilson, Thomas; Skinner, Andrew S., eds. (1976). The Market and the State: Essays in Honour of Adam Smith. Oxford: Clarendon Press – via Internet Archive.
- Ulster: Conflict and Consent (1989)
- Churchill and the Prof (1995)
