= John Martin (civil servant) =

British civil servant (1904–1991)

Sir John Martin KCMG CB CVO
- Sir John Miller Martin in 1946

Principal Private Secretary to the Prime Minister
- In office 1941–1945
- Prime Minister: Winston Churchill
- Preceded by: Eric Seal
- Succeeded by: Leslie Rowan

Personal details
- Born: John Miller Martin; 15 October 1904
- Died: 31 March 1991 (aged 86)
- Spouse: Rosalind Ross (m. 1943)
- Children: 1
- Education: Edinburgh Academy
- Alma mater: Corpus Christi College, Oxford
- Occupation: Civil servant
- Awards: CVO (1943); CB (1945); KCMG (1952)

Sir John Miller Martin KCMG CB CVO (15 October 1904 – 31 March 1991) was a British civil servant who served as Principal Private Secretary to the Prime Minister, Winston Churchill, during World War II. The position is a public, rather than private post. He was present at the most important strategic conferences and was knighted in 1952.

== Early life ==
John Miller Martin, born on 15 October 1904, was the son of the reverend John Martin (Church of Scotland). He was educated at the Edinburgh Academy and won a scholarship to Corpus Christi College, Oxford.

== Career ==
Having passed the civil service examination in 1927 he joined the Colonial and Dominion offices. After four years in Malaya he was appointed in 1936 as secretary of the Palestine Royal Commission.

In 1940 he transferred from the Colonial Office and was appointed to Churchill's staff at No. 10 as assistant private secretary. He wrote "admirable English" which Churchill considered essentail, had beautiful manners, was seen to be highly intelligent and was immensely conscientious. In his memoirs Churchill referred to Martin's "ascetic, clear-cut face". In 1941 he replaced Sir Eric Seal as Principal Private Secretary accompanying Churchill on his diplomatic missions.

His career was affected by contracting polio in Nigeria.

After a long and distinguished career his final posting was British High Commissioner for Malta in 1965 before retirement in 1967.

He was awarded a Royal Victorian Order (CVO) in the King's Birthday Honours 1943, an Order of the Bath (CB) in the 1945 Prime Minister's Resignation Honours and was knighted (KCMG) in the 1952 New Year Honours.

== Personal life ==
He married Rosalind Ross, daughter of Sir David Ross, in 1943. The union bore one son. Sir John Martin died on 31 March 1991 at the age of 86.

Government offices
Preceded by Eric Seal	Principal Private Secretary to the Prime Minister; 1941–1945	Succeeded by Leslie Rowan
