= Leslie Rowan =

British civil servant and industrialist

Sir Leslie Rowan KCB CVO
- Sir Thomas Leslie Rowan in 1949

Principal Private Secretary to the Prime Minister
- In office 1945–1947
- Prime Minister: Winston Churchill; Clement Attlee
- Preceded by: John Martin
- Succeeded by: Laurence Helsby

Personal details
- Born: Thomas Leslie Rowan; 22 February 1908 Dunlavin, Ireland
- Died: 29 April 1972 (aged 64) London
- Spouse: Catherine Patricia Love (m. 1944)
- Children: 4
- Education: Tonbridge School
- Alma mater: Queens' College, Cambridge
- Awards: CB (1946); CVO (1947); KCB (1949)

Sir Thomas Leslie Rowan KCB CVO (22 February 1908 – 29 April 1972) was a British civil servant and industrialist.

He served in the Colonial Office and HM Treasury, and was Principal Private Secretary to Winston Churchill and Clement Attlee, before joining the British Embassy in Washington, D.C., as economic minister. After some years heading the Overseas Finance Section of the Treasury, in 1966 he moved into the private sector as head of Vickers, and from 1971 until his sudden death was chairman of the British Council.

== Early life ==
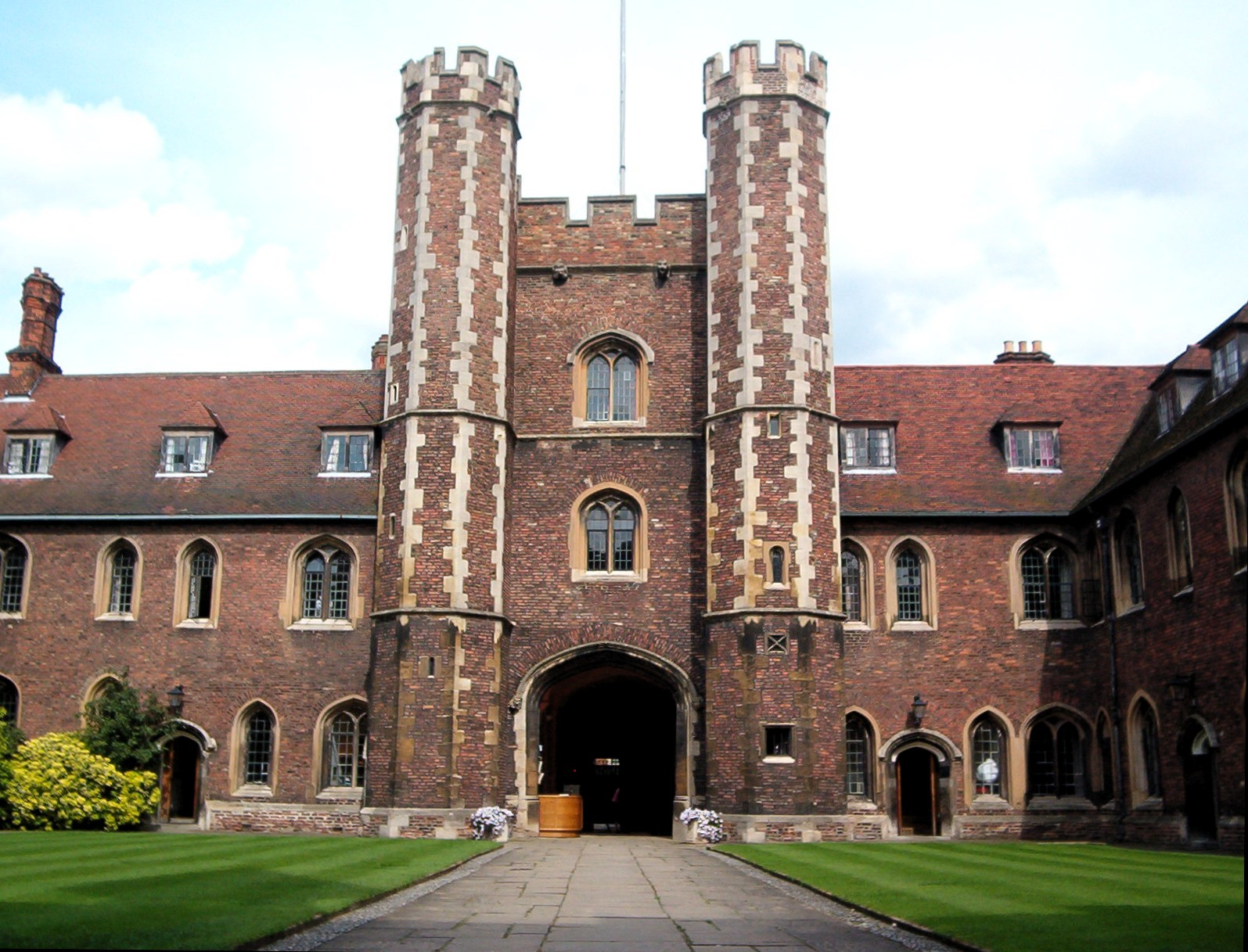
Queens' College, Cambridge

Rowan was born at Dunlavin, in County Wicklow, Ireland, then part of the United Kingdom of Great Britain and Ireland. He was a younger son of Thomas Rowan of Dromore West, County Sligo, a Church of Ireland clergyman and headmaster who became a missionary in British India, where Rowan spent most of his early childhood.

From 1920 to 1926, Rowan was educated as a day boy at Tonbridge School, serving as School Captain in his final year. He was in the school's First XI (cricket), First XI (hockey), and First XV (rugby). He was then an Exhibitioner at Queens' College, Cambridge, and also went on to captain the England men's national field hockey team. Hugh Dalton later described Rowan as "A bit too pi for me. School prefect type."

== Career ==
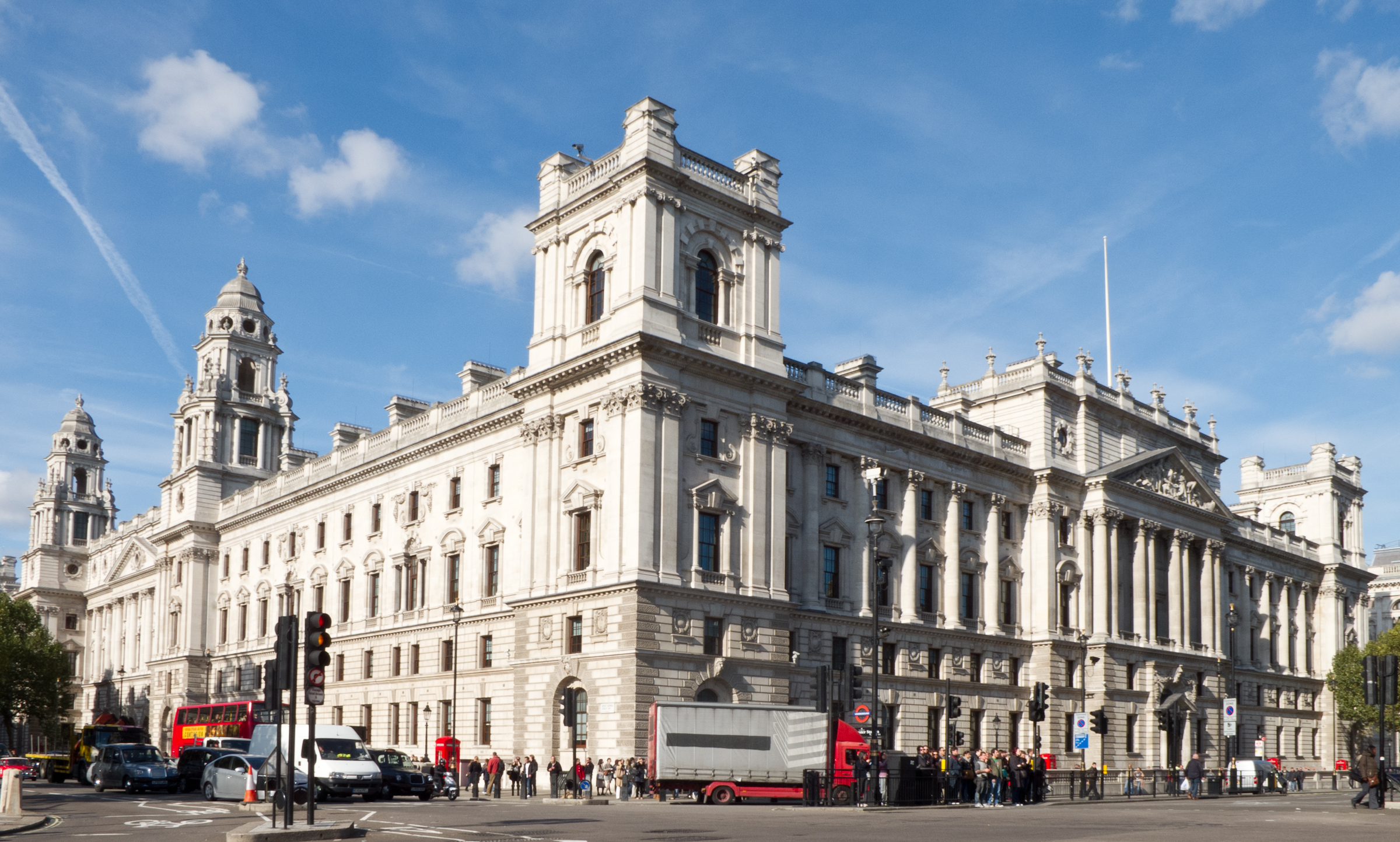
HM Treasury

Rowan served in the Colonial Office from 1930 to 1933, then was a civil servant in HM Treasury until 1947, but with responsibilities outside of it.

In 1941, Rowan became Assistant Private Secretary to Winston Churchill while he was British prime minister during the Second World War, and then was promoted to be Churchill's Principal Private Secretary; he remained at 10 Downing Street in this post when Clement Attlee took over as prime minister in 1945.

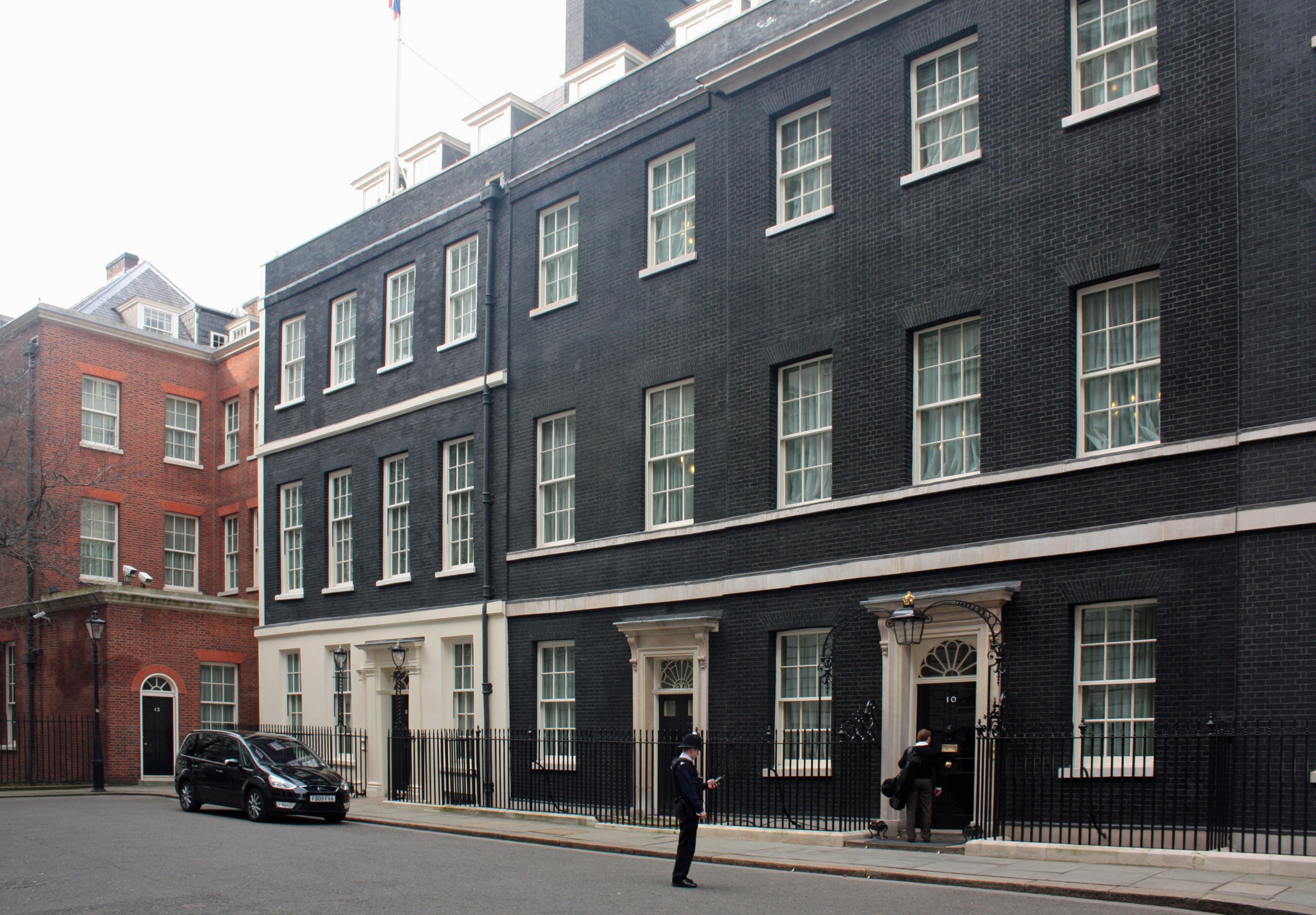
10, Downing Street

In 1947, Rowan was briefly Permanent Secretary in the Office of the Minister for Economic Affairs, then from 1947 to 1949 returned to HM Treasury as Second Secretary, gaining a knighthood in the 1949 Birthday Honours. From 1949 to 1951, Rowan was economic minister at the British Embassy in Washington, D.C., and returned from there to head the Overseas Finance Section of HM Treasury. In 1966, he succeeded Sir Charles Dunphie as head of the Vickers Group, with shipbuilding and armaments divisions. In 1971, he became chairman of the British Council.

== Private life ==
In 1939, Rowan was unmarried and living at Sloane House, Chelsea.

In 1944, in Kensington, Rowan married Catherine Patricia Love, an officer in the Women's Royal Naval Service and a daughter of Brigadier Raymond Love, of Mayford, and they had four children, Sarah Josephine Rowan, Susannah V. Rowan, Charles Rowan and Mark D. R. Rowan. Their daughter Susannah married Johnson Tamlyn, and their granddaughter Joanna Tamlyn married Sir Henry de la Poer Beresford-Peirse, 7th Baronet. Their son Mark married Katharine Julia Fraser, a great-granddaughter of Simon Fraser, 13th Lord Lovat, and they have four children.

On 13 October 1964, Rowan and his wife were the last dinner guests Winston Churchill entertained at Chartwell before his death. Lady Rowan later said of the occasion "It was sad to see such a great man become so frail".

At the time of his death on 29 April 1972, Rowan was living in Brompton, London SW3. He left an estate valued for probate at £56,422, equivalent to £668,249 in 2025.

== Honours ==
- Companion of the Order of the Bath (CB), 1946 New Year Honours
- Commander of the Royal Victorian Order (CVO), 1947
- Knight Commander of the Order of the Bath (KCB), The 1949 King's Birthday Honours

== Major publications ==
- Arms and Economics: The Changing Challenge (Cambridge University Press, 1960)
- Investment and Development: The Role of Private Investment in Developing Countries (Overseas Development Institute, 1965)

== Notes ==
Government offices
Preceded by John Martin	Principal Private Secretary to the Prime Minister; 1945–1947	Succeeded by Laurence Helsby
