= Tommy Thompson (Royal Navy officer) =

Commander Charles Ralfe "Tommy" Thompson, CMG, OBE (22 November 1894 – 11 August 1966) was a British naval officer and Prime Ministerial aide-de-camp.

Thompson was born at Penshaw, County Durham. A sailor from a young age, he worked in the submarine service of the Royal Navy during the first world war. Following armistice, he was assigned as Flag Lieutenant to Admiral Sir Arthur Waistell. When Waistell retired several years later, Thompson served as personal assistant for several successive Admirals, until finally being positioned as the first permanent Flag Lieutenant to the First Lord of the Admiralty by Sir Samuel Hoare. Thompson continued as Flag Lieutenant between the wars, and was Winston Churchill's first when he returned to the Admiralty in 1939.

Tommy Thompson's quarters in the war rooms.

Throughout Churchill's tenure as prime minister, Thompson remained at the Admiralty, but it is in his function as Prime Minister's Aide-de-camp that he is best remembered. During World War II, Thompson was rarely absent from Churchill's side and was present during major conferences and events in London and abroad.

In 1939 he became a member of the Order of the British Empire.

Thompson retired in 1945 alongside Churchill, ending his naval career with the rank of Commander. Churchill noted Thompson on his honours list.

A lifelong bachelor, Thompson died at the age of 71 in London.

== See also ==
- Winston Churchill
