= Chris Martin (civil servant) =

British civil servant (1973–2015)

Chris Martin CB CVO
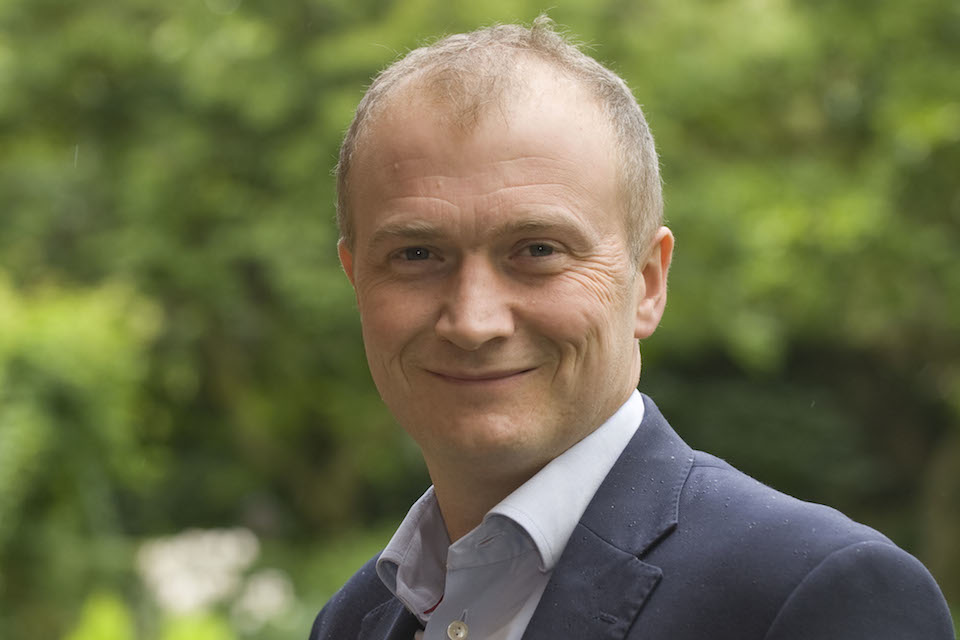

Principal Private Secretary to the Prime Minister
- In office 5 December 2011 – 25 November 2015
- Prime Minister: David Cameron
- Preceded by: James Bowler
- Succeeded by: Simon Case

Personal details
- Born: Christopher Jon Martin; 15 May 1973
- Died: 25 November 2015 (aged 42)
- Resting place: Highgate Cemetery
- Education: University of Bristol
- Awards: CB (2014); CVO (2015)

Christopher Jon Martin, CB, CVO (15 May 1973 – 25 November 2015) was a British civil servant. He was Principal Private Secretary to the Prime Minister from 2012 to 2015.

== Early life ==
Martin was born on 15 May 1973 in West Bromwich, Black Country, England. He was brought up in Hampshire, on the edge of the New Forest, and educated at Noadswood School, Dibden Purlieu (his local comprehensive school) and at Totton College, his local sixth form college. He studied physics at the University of Bristol before switching to a degree in politics, and graduated in 1996.

== Career ==
After graduating from university, Martin took the Civil Service fast-stream entrance exam. He came top and chose to join HM Treasury for what would be the last months of Kenneth Clarke's tenure. Under Brown, Martin took a number of roles, including being seconded to the Security Service ("MI5"). He eventually served as Brown's Press Secretary, remaining in post serving Alistair Darling when he replaced him as the Chancellor of the Exchequer. He held board level jobs at the Treasury and a Cabinet Office agency.

In January 2010, Martin moved to the Cabinet Office and was appointed deputy to the Cabinet Secretary (then Sir Gus O'Donnell). In December 2011, he was appointed the Principal Private Secretary to the Prime Minister and Director General of the Prime Minister's Office.

In the 2014 Queen's Birthday Honours, Martin was appointed a Companion of the Order of the Bath (CB) "for public service". In 2015, he was also appointed a Commander of the Royal Victorian Order (CVO); he was presented with the insignia for his CVO during a special ceremony in hospital (UCLH) on 21 November 2015, four days before his death.

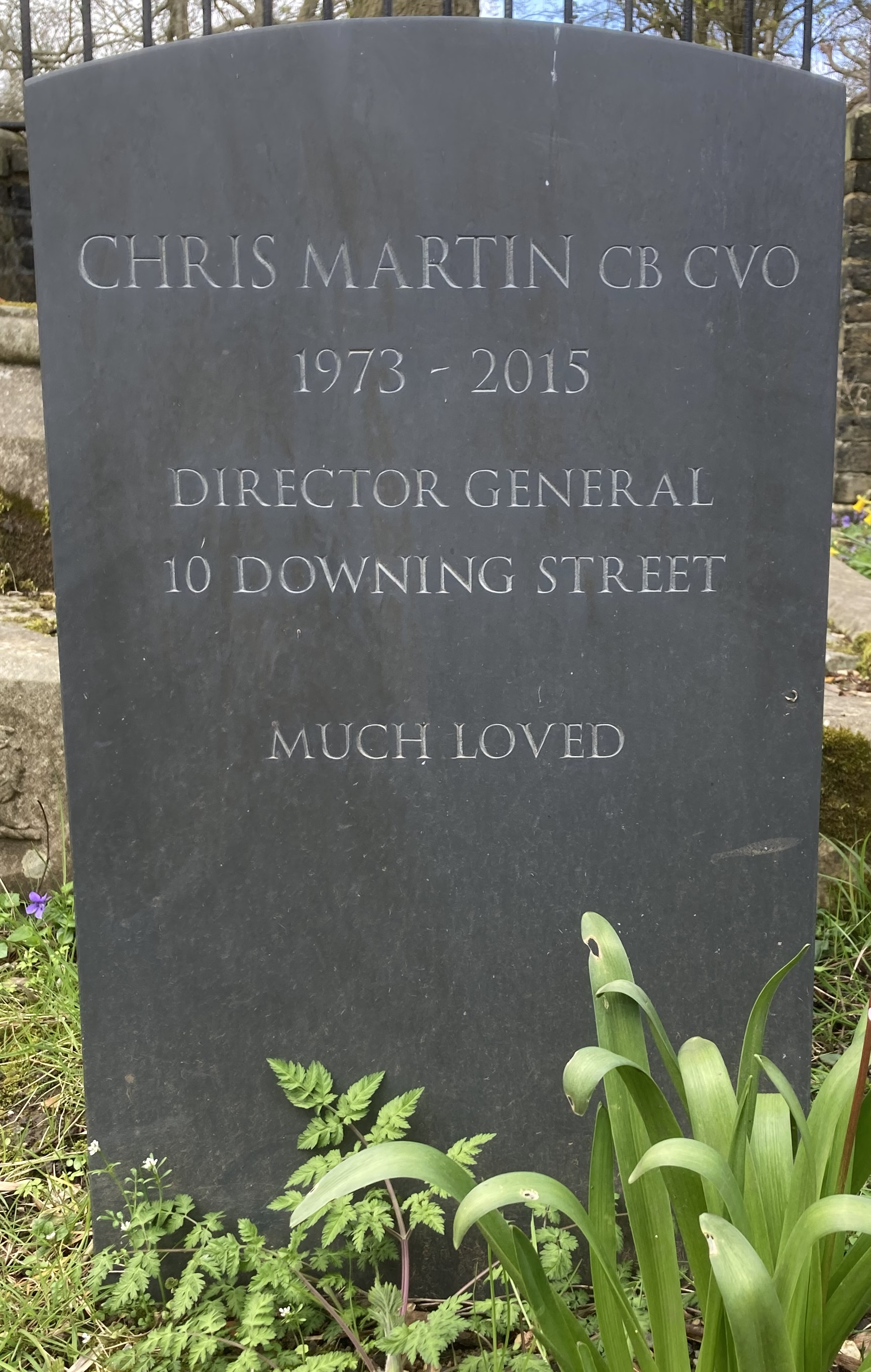
Grave of Chris Martin in Highgate Cemetery

He was described by former Head of the Civil Service Jeremy Heywood as "quite simply, one of the finest civil servants of his generation".

== Personal life ==
In 2005, Martin married Christina Scott. They separated in 2011 and later divorced. Shortly before his death he married Zoe Conway, a BBC journalist. Martin was a fan of Arsenal F.C. and held a season ticket.

== Death ==
Martin died from sarcoma on 25 November 2015. Tributes were paid to him during Prime Minister's Questions, and the Officials' Box was left empty on the request of the Prime Minister. A memorial service was held at St Margaret's, Westminster on 18 October 2016. He is buried on the eastern side of Highgate Cemetery. The Chris Martin Fellowship was established by SarcomaUK in his memory.

Government offices
Preceded by James Bowler	Principal Private Secretary to the Prime Minister; 2012 – 2015	Succeeded by Simon Case
