= Tom Scholar =

British civil servant (born 1968)

Sir Tom Scholar GCB
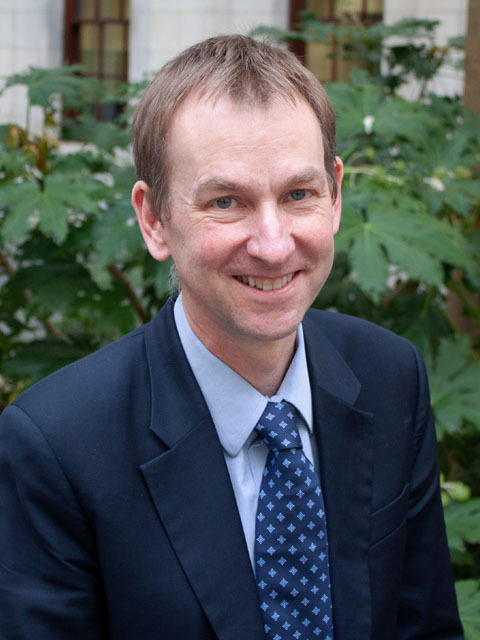

Permanent Secretary to the Treasury
- In office 13 July 2016 – 8 September 2022
- Chancellor: Philip Hammond; Sajid Javid; Rishi Sunak; Nadhim Zahawi; Kwasi Kwarteng
- Preceded by: Nick Macpherson
- Succeeded by: James Bowler

Prime Minister's Adviser for Europe and Global Issues
- In office 2013–2016
- Prime Minister: David Cameron
- Preceded by: Jon Cunliffe
- Succeeded by: Olly Robbins

Second Permanent Secretary to the Treasury
- In office 2009–2013
- Prime Minister: Gordon Brown; David Cameron
- Preceded by: John Kingman
- Succeeded by: Sharon White

Principal Private Secretary to the Prime Minister
- In office 27 June 2007 – 23 January 2008
- Prime Minister: Gordon Brown
- Preceded by: Olly Robbins
- Succeeded by: Jeremy Heywood

Downing Street Chief of Staff
- In office 27 June 2007 – 23 January 2008
- Prime Minister: Gordon Brown
- Preceded by: Jonathan Powell
- Succeeded by: Stephen Carter

Personal details
- Born: Thomas Whinfield Scholar; 17 December 1968 (age 57)
- Parent: Michael Scholar (father)
- Education: Dulwich College
- Alma mater: Trinity Hall, Cambridge (BA); London School of Economics (MSc)

Sir Thomas Whinfield Scholar GCB (born 17 December 1968) is a former British civil servant, who served as Permanent Secretary to the Treasury from 2016 to 2022. Following his exit from the UK Civil Service in September 2022, Scholar began to take up non-executive directorships in the private sector, including as chair of Santander UK from August 2025. As a civil servant, Scholar held multiple roles across various governments, including as an adviser on European and global issues in the Cabinet Office from 2013 to 2016, a director of Northern Rock post its nationalisation in 2008 and as chief of staff for Gordon Brown from mid 2007 to January 2008.

== Early life and education ==
Scholar was educated at Dulwich College (1979–1986), Trinity Hall, Cambridge (where he read History), and the London School of Economics.

He is the son of Sir Michael Scholar, who was Permanent Secretary of the Department of Trade and Industry between 1996 and 2001. He has two younger brothers, Richard and John (who is a lecturer in English literature at the University of Reading and worked at the Treasury).

== Career ==
Scholar joined HM Treasury in 1992, rising to Principal Private Secretary to the Chancellor of the Exchequer in 1997, serving Gordon Brown until 2001. Following that posting, Scholar served as the British representative on the boards of the International Monetary Fund and the World Bank, attached to the British Embassy in Washington as Minister for Economic Affairs for six years.

In 2007, following Brown's taking over the leadership of the Labour Party and thus the office of Prime Minister, Scholar returned to the UK, taking over the two roles of Downing Street Chief of Staff from Jonathan Powell and Principal Private Secretary to the Prime Minister from Oliver Robbins. After six months, Scholar left Number 10 to return to the Treasury as the Managing Director of its International and Finance Directorate in January 2008. The next year, Scholar was promoted to be the Second Permanent Secretary at the Treasury, taking over from John Kingman. In this role, Scholar was a director of the nationalised bank, Northern Rock.

In 2013, Scholar returned to Downing Street, now under David Cameron, to run the European and Global Issues Secretariat in the Cabinet Office and was the Prime Minister's most senior adviser on international affairs. As of September 2015, Scholar was paid a salary of between £150,000 and £154,999, making him one of the 328 most highly paid people in the British public sector at that time.

In March 2016, the government announced that Scholar would succeed Sir Nick Macpherson as Permanent Secretary to the Treasury in April 2016. Scholar was replaced at the Cabinet Office by Oliver Robbins, who took over the role as a "post-Brexit" unit in June 2016, which the next month became the Department for Exiting the European Union when Theresa May created her first Cabinet.

He was appointed Knight Commander of the Order of the Bath (KCB) by Queen Elizabeth II in the 2017 Birthday Honours and promoted to Knight Grand Cross of the same Order (GCB) by King Charles III in the 2023 New Year Honours.

Scholar was removed from his position as permanent secretary to the Treasury by Liz Truss and Kwasi Kwarteng on 8 September 2022, a move criticised by former senior civil servants including Gus O'Donnell and Robin Butler. Following the sacking, Dave Penman, General Secretary of the FDA, accused Truss of conducting an "ideological purge" of top officials.

In December 2023, he was appointed as non-executive chair of Nomura Europe Holdings plc, Nomura International plc and Nomura Bank International plc, subsidiaries of Nomura Holdings.

In May 2025, Scholar was appointed as non-executive director of Santander UK and later assumed the role of chair in August 2025, replacing William Vereker.

Government offices
Preceded by Jonathan Powell	Downing Street Chief of Staff; 2007–2008	Succeeded by Stephen Carter
Preceded by Olly Robbins	Principal Private Secretary to the Prime Minister; 2007–2008	Succeeded by Jeremy Heywood
Preceded by John Kingman	Second Permanent Secretary, HM Treasury; 2009–2013	Succeeded by Sharon White
Preceded by Jon Cunliffe	Prime Minister's Adviser, European and Global Issues; 2013–2016	Succeeded by Olly Robbins
Preceded by Nicholas Macpherson	Permanent Secretary to the Treasury; 2016–2022	Succeeded by James Bowler
