= Ronald Waterhouse (civil servant) =

British military officer (1878–1942)

Sir Ronald Waterhouse KCB CMG CVO

Principal Private Secretary to the Prime Minister
- In office 1922–1928 Serving with Sir Patrick Gower
- Prime Minister: Bonar Law; Stanley Baldwin; Ramsay MacDonald
- Preceded by: Sir Edward Grigg
- Succeeded by: Robert Vansittart

Personal details
- Born: Ronald Dockray Waterhouse; 28 December 1878
- Died: 28 November 1942 (aged 63) Devonshire
- Spouse(s): Violet Goldingham (m. 1904; died 1928) Nourah Chard (m. 1928)
- Education: Marlborough College, (Preshute)
- Alma mater: University of Oxford
- Civilian awards: CMG (1919); CB (1921); CVO (1922); KCB (1923)

Military service
- Allegiance: United Kingdom
- Branch/service: British Army, R.A.F.V.R
- Years of service: 1896–1910; 1914–1918; 1939–1942
- Rank: Lieutenant colonel Wing Commander
- Unit: Lincolnshire Regiment; 6th Dragoon Guards, Courier Service
- Battles/wars: Mashonaland; Second Boer War; First World War
- Military awards: Matabele Medal; Queen's Medal with four clasps King's Medal with two clasps Mons Star; British War Medal; Victory Medal

Lieutenant-Colonel Sir Ronald Dockray Waterhouse KCB CMG CVO (28 December 1878 – 28 November 1942) was a British Army, Royal Air Force officer and civil servant. During his career, he was private secretary to the Duke of York (later George VI), and to three prime ministers: Bonar Law, Stanley Baldwin, and Ramsay MacDonald.

== Early life and military service ==
Ronald Waterhouse, the son of J.D. Waterhouse of Aigburth, Lancashire was educated at Marlborough College (Preshute house). His school career came to an abrupt end in 1895 after he was 'sent home in disgrace with a shocking report', whereupon his father gave him a single gold sovereign and put him on a boat bound for Cape Town, South Africa. Not long after arriving, his gold sovereign was stolen by a trooper of the Matabele Mounted Police; in seeking to retrieve it he joined the same corps, and became embroiled in the Jameson Raid. Grazed by gunfire, he was assisted by a fellow trooper who turned out to be the man who had stolen his money; the two of them travelled steerage back to England soon afterwards.

The outbreak of the Second Matabele War prompted Waterhouse to return to South Africa, where he served as a scout with Gifford's Horse. In 1897 he took part in the Queen's Diamond Jubilee celebrations in London, as a member of the South Africa contingent; following the death of his father, he was compelled to go to Oxford 'to complete his formal education'. He afterwards applied for a commission in the 3rd (Militia) battalion of the Lincolnshire Regiment; in December 1899 he was granted a regular commission in the 2nd battalion, and again returned to South Africa to fight in the Second Boer War. He was severely injured at Paardeberg and invalided home, but subsequently returned to combat in South Africa, this time with the 6th Dragoon Guards. Afterwards stationed in India with the same regiment, he was placed on temporary half pay due to ill health in 1905, before being granted a wound pension and retiring from the Army in 1910.

At the outbreak of the First World War he again sought to join up, but was rejected because of his old wounds; instead he was appointed in 1914 to lead a searcher unit of the BRCS and OSJJ, and went on to be awarded the Mons Star and the Cross of an Esquire of the Order of St John, for discovering and identifying casualties during and after the retreat from Mons. The following year, however, saw him back in the Army as a General Staff officer with the temporary rank of Captain, having oversight of the Military Permit Offices on the south coast of England. Promoted to the rank of Major in April 1918, he went on to serve in the RAF as an intelligence officer (and was promoted to the temporary rank of Lieutenant-Colonel in December of that year). He attended the Paris Peace Conference in 1919, and was afterwards awarded a CMG; he then went on to serve as Private Secretary to Sir Frederick Sykes (Controller General of Civil Aviation) until August 1920.

== Subsequent career ==
After leaving the RAF, Lt-Col. Waterhouse was appointed to serve as Private Secretary to Bonar Law, M.P., who was at that time Lord Privy Seal and Leader of the House of Commons. The following year he was made Private Secretary to the Duke of York (the future King George VI). Towards the end of 1922 he resigned this post in order to take up the role of Principal Private Secretary to Bonar Law, who was now Prime Minister. (Waterhouse's service with the Duke of York was recognised by the award of a CVO that same year). He served as Principal Private Secretary to three successive Prime Ministers, before stepping down in February 1928 as a result of an 'extra-marital entanglement'.

After leaving 10 Downing Street he took up a directorship with the Canadian General Investment Trust Ltd. He was a Fellow of the Royal Geographical Society.

In 1927 he had been appointed as one of HM Lieutenants within the City of London, and continued to serve until the early 1940s.

=== World War II ===
Although aged 60, Waterhouse joined the Royal Air Force Volunteer Reserve to serve in the Second World War. Although he had previously left the RAF with the equivalent rank of Wing Commander, he rejoined as a Pilot Officer (and was later promoted to Flying Officer). He remained in service, on staff duties, up until his death in November 1942.

== Personal life ==
His first wife Violet Goldingham died in June 1928 and he wasted no time, remarrying in secret at the Savoy Chapel in the Strand to Miss Nourah Chard, private secretary to Mrs Baldwin on 3 August 1928. She published a biography of her husband entitled Private and Official in 1942.

=== Honours ===
Having been appointed a Companion of the Order of Saint Michael and Saint George in October 1919, Waterhouse was made a Companion of the Order of the Bath (CB) in the 1921 Birthday Honours list. He was then appointed Commander of the Royal Victorian Order (CVO) in the 1923 New Year Honours list (backdated to December 1922), before being made a Knight Commander of the Order of the Bath in May 1923 (Bonar Law's resignation honours list).

=== Death ===
Waterhouse died on 28 November 1942 due to illness caused by war service and was cremated at Plymouth City Crematorium, Devon.

Government offices
Preceded by Sir Edward Grigg	Principal Private Secretary to the Prime Minister; 1922–1928 alongside Sir Patrick Gower	Succeeded by Robert Vansittart
