= Philip de Zulueta =

British diplomat (1925–1989)

Sir Philip de Zulueta

Private Secretary for Foreign Affairs to the Prime Minister
- In office 1955–1964
- Preceded by: Guy Millard
- Succeeded by: Oliver Wright

Personal details
- Born: Philip Francis de Zulueta; 2 January 1925
- Died: 15 April 1989 (aged 64)
- Spouse: Hon. Marie Louise Hennessy (m. 1955; died 1989)
- Children: 2
- Parent: Francis de Zulueta
- Education: New College, Oxford; Beaumont College

Sir Philip Francis de Zulueta (2 January 1925 – 15 April 1989) was a British diplomat and businessman who served as private secretary for foreign affairs to three successive prime ministers of the United Kingdom.

== Early life ==
Philip de Zulueta was born on 2 January 1925. He was the son of Francis de Zulueta, the Regius Professor of Civil Law at the University of Oxford from 1919 until 1948.

He was educated at Beaumont College and New College, Oxford, where his studies were interrupted by World War II in which he served in the Welsh Guards.

== Career ==
He entered the Diplomatic Service in 1949 and served in Moscow from 1950 to 1952 as private secretary to the Ambassador, Sir David Kelly. In 1955 de Zulueta was appointed to be a private secretary to the prime minister, Anthony Eden (normally one private secretary is seconded from the Foreign Office; this time there were two, de Zulueta and Guy Millard). He continued in this role under Harold Macmillan and Sir Alec Douglas-Home. He was knighted in 1963 in Macmillan's resignation honours.

De Zulueta resigned from the Foreign Service in 1964 and became a merchant banker. He was a director of Hill Samuel from 1965 to 1972 and its chief executive from 1973 until 1976. He was chairman of Antony Gibbs Holdings from 1976 to 1981.

De Zulueta was a member of the Franco-British Council from 1972 and chairman of its British section from 1981.

== Personal life ==
On 14 September 1955, de Zulueta married the Hon. Marie Louise Hennessy, daughter of Angela Duggan and James Hennessy, 2nd Baron Windlesham. They had two children:

- Louise Angela Mary de Zulueta (b. 1956), who married Mark Donald Seligman, son of Spencer Walter Oscar Seligman, in 1982.
- Francis Philip Harold de Zulueta (b. 1959), who married Miranda Jane Howden, daughter of Philip Alexander Howden, in 1981. After they divorced, he married Pandora (née Jeffreys) Wodehouse, former wife of Hon. Edward Abdy Wodehouse (a son of the 4th Earl of Kimberley), in 1987.

De Zulueta died on 15 April 1989. After his death the French Ambassador wrote to The Times about de Zulueta:

"He was a clear thinking, determined, optimistic and committed friend to whose memory I should like to pay tribute and express my deep gratitude, both in my own name and even more in that of my country."

Diplomatic posts
Preceded by Guy Millard	Private Secretary for Foreign Affairs to the Prime Minister; 1955–1964	Succeeded by Oliver Wright
