= Permanent Secretary to the Treasury =

British civil service position

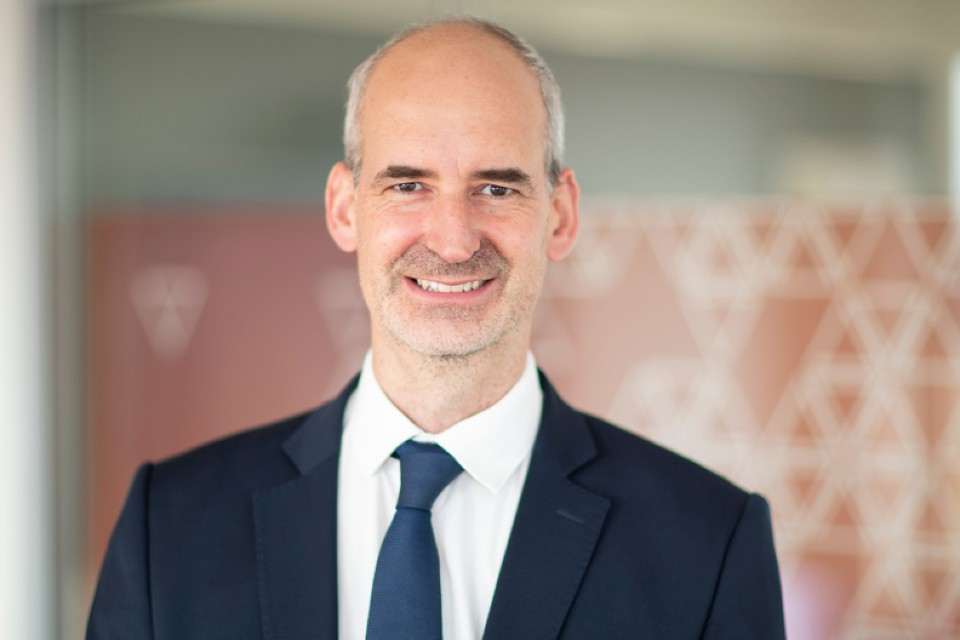
James Bowler, current Permanent Secretary to the Treasury

The UK Permanent Secretary to the Treasury is the most senior civil servant at HM Treasury. The post originated as that of Assistant Secretary to the Treasury in 1805; that office was given new duties and renamed in 1867 as a Permanent Secretaryship.

The position is generally regarded as the second most influential in His Majesty's Civil Service; Andrew Turnbull (Permanent Secretary from 1998 to 2002) and Gus O'Donnell (2002–2005) were Permanent Secretaries to the Treasury who then became Cabinet Secretary, the most influential post.

Previous incumbents have not always maintained the political neutrality expected of civil servants; in 1909 Sir George Murray was involved in lobbying various Crossbench peers in the House of Lords to reject the Chancellor of the Exchequer's proposed budget. In 2014, during the Scottish Independence referendum campaign, Sir Nicholas Macpherson broke with convention by publishing private advice to Chancellor of the Exchequer George Osborne. The decision to publish was later criticised for compromising the impartiality of the Civil Service.

== Assistant Secretaries to the Treasury ==
- George Harrison (1805–1826)
- William Hill (1826–1828)
- James Henry Keith Stewart (1828–1836)
- Alexander Spearman (1836–1840)
- Sir Charles Trevelyan (1840–1859)
- George Alexander Hamilton (1859–1867)

== Permanent Secretaries to the Treasury ==
- George Alexander Hamilton (1867–1870)
- Sir Ralph Lingen (1870–1885)
- Sir Reginald Welby (1885–1894)
- Sir Francis Mowatt (1894–1903) (jointly from 1902)
- Sir Edward Hamilton (1902–1908) (joint)
- Sir George Murray (1903–1911) (jointly until 1908)
- Sir Robert Chalmers (1911–1913) (joint)
- Sir Thomas Heath (1911–1916) (joint)
- Sir John Bradbury (1913–1919) (joint)
- Sir Robert Chalmers (1916–1919) (joint)
- Sir Warren Fisher (1919–1939)
- Sir Horace Wilson (1939–1942)
- Sir Richard Hopkins (1942–1945)
- Sir Edward Bridges (1945–1956)
- Sir Norman Brook (1956–1962) (jointly until 1959 and from 1960)
- Sir Roger Makins (1956–1959) (joint)
- Sir Frank Lee (1960–1962) (joint)
- Sir William Armstrong (1962–1968) (jointly until 1963 and from 1968)
- Sir Laurence Helsby (1962–1968) (joint)
- Sir Douglas Allen (1968–1974) (jointly until 1968)
- Sir Douglas Wass (1974–1983)
- Sir Peter Middleton (1983–1991)
- Sir Terence Burns (1991–1998)
- Sir Andrew Turnbull (1998–2002)
- Sir Gus O'Donnell (2002–2005)
- Sir Nicholas Macpherson (2005–2016)
- Sir Tom Scholar (2016–2022)
- James Bowler (2022–present)

Although no joint secretaries have served since 1968, since Cabinet Secretaries ceased serving simultaneously as Permanent Secretary of the Treasury, it is common for there to be one or more second permanent secretaries in addition to the (first) permanent secretary, and often, uniquely to the Treasury, multiple second permanent secretaries serving a long-term basis. For instance, in 2025, following the appointment of Jim O'Neil, there were three second permanent secretaries in the Treasury.
