= Raymond Love =

English cricketer

Personal information
- Full name: Raymond Henry Arnold Davison Love
- Born: 11 May 1888; Chatham, Kent, England
- Died: 12 October 1962 (aged 74); Pyrford, Surrey, England
- Batting: Right-handed
- Bowling: Right-arm medium

Domestic team information
- Years: Team
- 1923: Hampshire

Career statistics
Competition	First-class
Matches	2
Runs scored	15
Batting average	7.50
100s/50s	0/0
Top score	13*
Balls bowled	12
Wickets	0
Bowling average	–
5 wickets in innings	–
10 wickets in match	–
Best bowling	–
Catches/stumpings	2/–
- Source: Cricinfo, 26 December 2009

Raymond Henry Arnold Davison Love (11 May 1888 — 12 October 1962) was an English first-class cricketer and British Army officer.

The son of the British Indian Army soldier Henry Davison Love, he was born at Chatham in May 1885. He was educated at Marlborough College, before proceeding to the Royal Military Academy, Woolwich. From there, he graduated into the Royal Artillery as a second lieutenant in December 1908, with promotion to lieutenant following in December 1911. In the first month of the First World War, Love was seconded to command a company of gentlemen cadets at Woolwich. In December 1914, he was promoted to captain and remained seconded into September 1915. He was made an acting major in November 1916, with promotion to the full rank following in June 1918.

Following the war he served in Mesopotamia in 1919 and 1920. Love later made two appearances in first-class cricket for Hampshire in 1923, against Sussex at Hove and Nottinghamshire at County Ground, Southampton. He scored 15 runs in these two matches, with a highest score of 13 not out. From 1932 to 1935, he served as a commandant in British Malaya with the Federated Malay States Volunteer Force. There, he played polo for the Royal Selangor Club. He was promoted to lieutenant colonel in April 1936, after which he was commander of the Royal Artillery at Gibraltar from July 1938 to 1940; during his command, Love was promoted to colonel in October 1938. He served during the Second World War, during which he commanded the Royal Artillery in British Mauritius from 1942 to 1944. Love retired from active service during the conflict, and was granted the honorary rank of brigadier. Love died in October 1962 at Pyrford, Surrey.
