= Principal Private Secretary to the Prime Minister of the United Kingdom =

Senior official in the British Civil Service

Principal Private Secretary to the Prime Minister
- Royal Arms as used by His Majesty's Government
- Incumbent; Dan York-Smith since 1 September 2025
- Prime Minister's Office
- Reports to: Prime Minister
- Nominator: Prime Minister
- Appointer: Prime Minister
- Formation: 1757
- Website: 10 Downing Street

The principal private secretary to the prime minister of the United Kingdom is a senior official in the civil service of the United Kingdom. As a principal private secretary, they are traditionally responsible for running the prime minister's private office in 10 Downing Street. In the Civil Service, the role is currently graded as director general.

The current principal private secretary is Dan York-Smith.

== History ==
As the role of prime minister has evolved over time, so has the role of principal private secretary. Thomas Pelham-Holles, 1st Duke of Newcastle appointed a private secretary during his second term of office as First Lord of the Treasury (1757–62), and his 18th-century successors for the most part did likewise. The Private Secretary at this time was not on the establishment of HM Treasury and he was not paid an official salary. This changed in 1806, when money was made available from public funds. In 1813 the funding available was doubled to enable a second private secretary to be employed, alongside the first (or 'principal') holder of the office.

At this time it became customary for one of the private secretaries to be appointed from within the Civil Service (more often than not from the Treasury) to provide administrative support, and the other to be recruited from outside the Civil Service (including on occasion from the House of Commons) to provide political support. (In today's terms the latter were more akin to special advisers or a Parliamentary Private Secretary.) A third Private Secretary was added in the 1870s.

Under Lloyd George (prime minister from 1916 to 1922), the duties of the Principal Private Secretary changed, as some responsibilities were transferred to a new Secretariat (the so-called 'Garden Suburb'), while others (particularly those relating to meetings of the Cabinet and the implementation of its decisions) were taken up by the newly established Cabinet Office and Cabinet Secretary. At the same time the number of clerical staff working in the office was substantially increased, which eased the administrative burden. The Principal Private Secretary was left to focus on arranging the prime minister's diary, offering advice and personal support, and overseeing certain particular areas (such as honours and appointments).

Up until the 1920s the private office of the prime minister was usually staffed by personal and/or political appointees; a new prime minister would often bring in his own people (either from the civil service or from outside), and there was invariably a change of staff with a change of government. Ronald Waterhouse and Patrick Gower, however, who were appointed to the office by the Conservative Bonar Law in 1922, remained in post not only under his Conservative successor Stanley Baldwin but also under the first Labour prime minister Ramsay MacDonald. Since then the Principal Private Secretary has been considered a member of the permanent Civil Service, rather than a political or personal appointee, and as such may remain in office in spite of any change of administration.

For many years, although there was a hierarchy of officials within the private office, it was not generally made public (instead the 'private secretaries' were simply listed in alphabetical order); but this changed in 1929 when Robert Vansittart was listed as 'principal' private secretary for the first time in the Imperial Calendar.

=== Recent history ===
During Tony Blair's administration, the prime minister (as Minister for the Civil Service) modified the law under which the Civil Service operated (through an Order in Council) which gave power to the newly created role of Downing Street Chief of Staff (a politically appointed special adviser) to give instructions to civil servants and outranked the principal private secretary in the Downing Street power structure. When Gordon Brown entered 10 Downing Street, he reversed the change to the Civil Service law.

When David Cameron became prime minister, he promoted his then principal private secretary to a new post of "Downing Street Permanent Secretary"; a position which took over as the top civil servant in the Prime Minister's Office and for the first time the head of the office held the highest rank in the UK's civil service. In 2012, when the post-holder, Jeremy Heywood, was appointed Cabinet Secretary; this new post ceased to exist, and the chief Civil Service official in 10 Downing Street reverted to being the Principal Private Secretary, which remains to this day.

The principal secretary runs the private office of the prime minister, which includes the Private Secretary for Foreign Affairs to the Prime Minister.

The principal private secretary is, with the Private Secretary to the Sovereign and the Cabinet Secretary, part of the "golden triangle" of officials responsible for supporting the sovereign to appoint a prime minister in the event of a hung parliament, when it is not immediately clear who can command a majority in the House of Commons. This is important for ensuring that the sensitive process runs smoothly and that the sovereign is not implicated in political debate or manoeuvres.

== List of principal private secretaries to the prime minister (from 1757, incomplete) ==
Principal Private Secretary	Years	Prime Minister
Montagu Corry	1868	Benjamin Disraeli
Algernon West	1868–1872	William Gladstone
Montagu Corry	1874–1880	Benjamin Disraeli
Arthur Godley	1880–1882	William Gladstone
Edward Walter Hamilton	1882–1885	William Gladstone
Henry Manners, Marquess of Granby	1885–1886	Robert Gascoyne-Cecil
post vacant	1886	William Gladstone
Henry Manners, Marquess of Granby	1886–1888	Robert Gascoyne-Cecil
Schomberg Kerr McDonnell	1888–1892	Robert Gascoyne-Cecil
Sir Algernon West	1892–1894	William Gladstone
George Herbert Murray	1894–1895	Archibald Primrose
Schomberg Kerr McDonnell	1895–1902	Robert Gascoyne-Cecil
John Satterfield Sandars	1902–1905	Arthur Balfour
Arthur Ponsonby	1905–1908	Sir Henry Campbell-Bannerman
Vaughan Nash	1908–1911	H. H. Asquith
Maurice Bonham-Carter	1911–1916	H. H. Asquith
Sir John T Davies	1916–1922	David Lloyd George
Edward Grigg	1921–1922	David Lloyd George
Sir Patrick Gower; Lt Col Sir Ronald Waterhouse	1922–1923	Bonar Law
Sir Patrick Gower; Lt Col Sir Ronald Waterhouse	1923–1924	Stanley Baldwin
Sir Patrick Gower; Lt Col Sir Ronald Waterhouse	1924	Ramsay MacDonald
Sir Patrick Gower; Lt Col Sir Ronald Waterhouse	1924–1928	Stanley Baldwin
Sir Robert Vansittart	1928–1929	Stanley Baldwin
Sir Robert Vansittart	1929–1930	Ramsay MacDonald
Sir Patrick Duff	1930–1933	Ramsay MacDonald
Alan Barlow	1933–1934	Ramsay MacDonald
Harold Vincent	1934–1935	Ramsay MacDonald
Harold Vincent	1935–1936	Stanley Baldwin
Osmund Cleverly	1935–1937	Stanley Baldwin
Osmund Cleverly	1937–1939	Neville Chamberlain
Arthur Rucker	1939–1940	Neville Chamberlain
Eric Seal	1940–1941	Winston Churchill
John Martin	1941–1945	Winston Churchill
Leslie Rowan	1945	Winston Churchill
Leslie Rowan	1945–1947	Clement Attlee
Laurence Helsby	1947–1950	Clement Attlee
Denis Rickett	1950–1951	Clement Attlee
David Pitblado	1951	Clement Attlee
Jock Colville ^{(PPS: defence and external affairs)} David Pitblado ^{(PPS: home and internal affairs)}	1951–1955	Winston Churchill
David Pitblado	1955–1956	Anthony Eden
Frederick Bishop	1956–1957	Anthony Eden
Frederick Bishop	1957–1959	Harold Macmillan
Timothy Bligh	1959–1963	Harold Macmillan
Timothy Bligh	1963–1964	Alec Douglas-Home
Derek Mitchell	1964–1966	Harold Wilson
Lt Col Arthur Norman Halls	1966–1970	Harold Wilson
Alexander Isserlis	1970	Harold Wilson
Alexander Isserlis	1970	Edward Heath
Robert Armstrong	1970–1974	Edward Heath
Robert Armstrong	1974–1975	Harold Wilson
Kenneth Stowe	1975–1976	Harold Wilson
Kenneth Stowe	1976–1979	James Callaghan
Kenneth Stowe	1979	Margaret Thatcher
Clive Whitmore	1979–1982	Margaret Thatcher
Robin Butler	1982–1985	Margaret Thatcher
Nigel Wicks	1985–1988	Margaret Thatcher
Andrew Turnbull	1988–1990	Margaret Thatcher
Andrew Turnbull	1990–1992	John Major
Alex Allan	1992–1997	John Major
Alex Allan	1997	Tony Blair
Sir John Holmes	1997–1999	Tony Blair
Jeremy Heywood	1999–2003	Tony Blair
Ivan Rogers	2003–2006	Tony Blair
Oliver Robbins	2006–2007	Tony Blair
Oliver Robbins	2007	Gordon Brown
Tom Scholar	2007–2008	Gordon Brown
Jeremy Heywood	2008–2010	Gordon Brown
James Bowler	2010–2011	David Cameron
Chris Martin	2011–2015	David Cameron
Simon Case	2016	David Cameron
Simon Case	2016–2017	Theresa May
Peter Hill	2017–2019	Theresa May
Peter Hill	2019	Boris Johnson
Martin Reynolds	2019–2022	Boris Johnson
Peter Wilson	2022	Boris Johnson
Nick Catsaras	2022	Liz Truss
Elizabeth Perelman	2022–2024	Rishi Sunak
Elizabeth Perelman	2024	Keir Starmer
Nin Pandit	2024–2025	Keir Starmer
Dan York-Smith	2025–present	Keir Starmer

== See also ==
- Prime Minister's Office
- Principal Private Secretary to the Secretary of State for Foreign and Commonwealth Affairs
