= Frederick Bishop =

British civil servant (1915–2005)

Sir Frederick Arthur Bishop CB CVO (4 December 1915 – 2 March 2005), sometimes called Freddie Bishop, was a British civil servant who served as Principal Private Secretary to the Prime Minister of the United Kingdom, 1956–59.
