= Patrick Gower (civil servant) =

British civil servant (1887–1964)

Sir Patrick Gower KBE CB CVO
- Gower in 1927

Principal Private Secretary to the Prime Minister
- In office 1922–1928 Serving with Ronald Waterhouse
- Prime Minister: Bonar Law; Stanley Baldwin; Ramsay MacDonald
- Preceded by: Sir Edward Grigg
- Succeeded by: Robert Vansittart

Personal details
- Born: Robert Patrick Malcolm Gower; 18 August 1887 Cardigan, Pembrokeshire, Wales
- Died: 31 August 1964 (aged 77) Henley, Oxfordshire, England
- Spouses: Nancy Barkley (m. 1913; died 1940); H. Margaret Hawdon (m. 1941)
- Relations: Sir Robert Gower
- Children: 2
- Education: Marlborough College
- Alma mater: Emmanuel College, Cambridge
- Awards: Order of the Bath (1922); Royal Victorian Order (1923); Order of the British Empire (1924)

Sir Robert Patrick Malcolm Gower KBE CB CVO (18 August 1887 – 31 August 1964) was a British civil servant who served as the Principal Private Secretary to the Prime Minister between 1922 and 1928.

== Early life ==
Patrick Gower was born in Cardigan, Pembrokeshire, the younger son of Captain Erasmus Gower of Pembrokeshire. He was educated at Marlborough College and gained a scholarship to Emmanuel College, Cambridge.

== Career ==
Gower served as Private Secretary to Austen Chamberlain as Chancellor of the Exchequer and as Lord Privy Seal, from 1919 to 1922. He served as Principal Private Secretary to the Prime Minister of the United Kingdom, during which time he served three different prime ministers; Bonar Law; Stanley Baldwin; and Ramsay MacDonald, from 1922 to 1928. After leaving 10 Downing Street, Gower served as Chief Press Officer to the Conservative Party from 1929 to 1939. In 1939 he left Whitehall to become chairman of advertising firm Charles F. Higham, where he remained until retirement.

He was awarded an Order of the Bath (CB) in the 1922 New Years Honours list; a Royal Victorian Order (CVO) in the 1923 Prime Minister's Resignation Honours; and was knighted (KBE) for services to the Prime Minister. in the 1924 Prime Minister's Resignation Honours.

== Personal life ==
He married Nancy Barkley in 1913, with whom he had one son and one daughter. Upon her death in 1940 he remarried in March 1941 to H. Margaret Hawdon. He died at home in Henley, Oxfordshire, on 31 August 1964.

Government offices
| Preceded by Sir Edward Grigg | Principal Private Secretary to the Prime Minister; 1922–1928 alongside Ronald Waterhouse | Succeeded by Robert Vansittart |
