= Sir Harold Vincent =

English cricketer and civil servant

Personal information
- Full name: Harold Graham Vincent
- Born: 13 November 1891; Harlesden, Middlesex, England
- Died: 5 November 1981 (aged 89); Tonbridge, Kent, England
- Batting: Right-handed

Domestic team information
- Years: Team
- 1914: Cambridge University

Career statistics
Competition	First-class
Matches	4
Runs scored	106
Batting average	13.25
100s/50s	–/–
Top score	41
Balls bowled	19
Wickets	0
Bowling average	–
5 wickets in innings	–
10 wickets in match	–
Best bowling	–
Catches/stumpings	11/–
- Source: Cricinfo, 25 January 2022

Sir Harold Graham Vincent KCMG CB CVO (13 November 1891 — 5 November 1981) was an English first-class cricketer and civil servant.

Vincent was born at Harlesden in November 1891. He was educated at Haileybury, where he played for the college cricket team from 1909 to 1911. Against Cheltenham College at Lord's in 1910, Vincent made scores of 52 and 118 not out; despite this Haileybury lost by an innings. From Haileybury he matriculated to Jesus College, Cambridge. While studying at Cambridge, he played first-class cricket for Cambridge University Cricket Club in 1914, making four appearances. He scored 106 runs in his four matches, with a highest score of 41. His appearance in The University Match gained him a blue.

After graduating from Cambridge, Vincent fought in the First World War. He was commissioned as a second lieutenant into the London Rifle Brigade in September 1914, and travelled to the Western Front in November 1914. He was made a temporary lieutenant in March 1915, and was wounded in action in May 1915, temporarily being invalided from service. Upon his recovery he was transferred to the East Lancashire Royal Engineers in September 1915, spending time as an instructor at Signalling Schools when he was seconded with the Royal Corps of Signals. He had returned to the London Rifle Brigade by March 1917, having been promoted to captain in June 1916.

Following the war, Vincent successfully applied to enter the Civil Service as a clerk in the Treasury in September 1919. He was private secretary to successive Prime Ministers from 1928 to 1934 and served as Principal Private Secretary from 1934 to 1936. He was made a Commander of the Royal Victorian Order in the 1932 New Year Honours and made a Companion to the Order of the Bath in the 1935 Birthday Honours. Vincent moved to the Committee of Imperial Defence, where he was Principal Assistant Secretary from 1936 to 1939, before holding the same position at the Ministry of Food (1939–41), Works and Buildings and Town and Country Planning (1941–44), Ministry of Production (1944–46), and the Ministry of Civil Aviation (1946–49). He was made a Knight Commander of the Order of St Michael and St George in the 1953 Coronation Honours. In 1975, the Brotherton Library at the University of Leeds released a lengthy memo written by Vincent in 1938 to Edward Bridges criticising the "hopeless state" of administrative organisation for defence. Vincent died at Tonbridge in November 1981; he was the last survivor of the 1914 University Match.
