= Derek Mitchell (civil servant) =

British civil servant

Sir Derek Jack Mitchell KCB CVO (5 March 1922 - 16 August 2009) was a British civil servant who served as Principal Private Secretary to the Prime Minister between 1964 and 1966, and Second Permanent Secretary at Her Majesty's Treasury between 1973 and 1977.
