= Patrick Kinna =

Winston Churchill's stenographer (1913–2009)

Patrick Kinna MBE
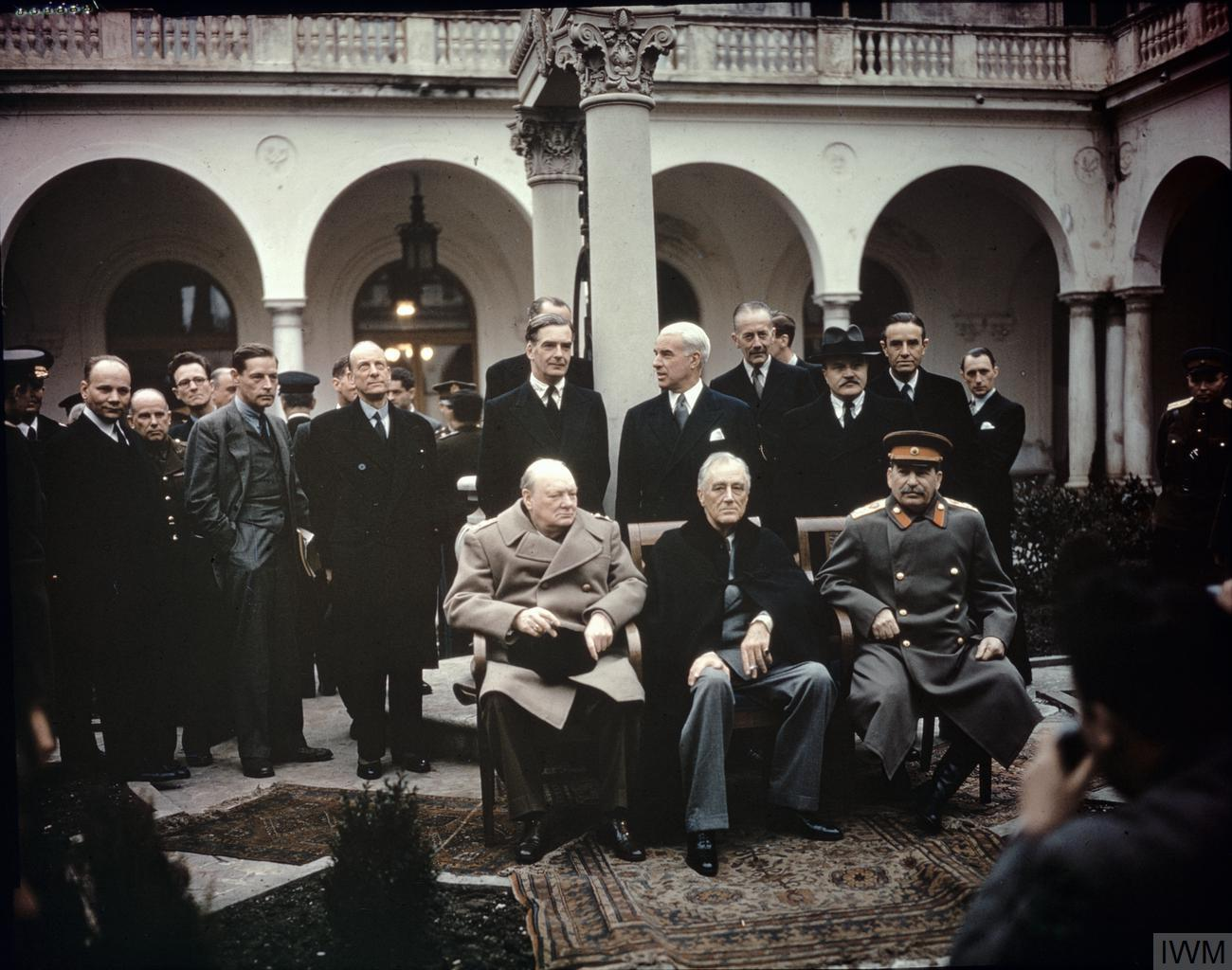
- The Yalta Conference, Crimea, February 1945 - Kinna is fifth from left
- Born: 5 September 1913; Kent
- Died: 14 March 2009 (aged 95); Westerham, Kent
- Occupation: Civil servant
- Known for: Secretary and stenographer to Winston Churchill
- Children: None

Patrick Francis Kinna MBE (September 5, 1913 – March 14, 2009) was Winston Churchill's stenographer during World War II.

Kinna was born in 1913, the eighth child of Captain Thomas Kinna, who as a boy had met Napoleon III when serving as an acolyte in the Catholic Church at Eltham. Thomas Kinna was subsequently decorated for his part in the relief of Ladysmith.

Patrick Kinna was the Duke of Windsor's confidential clerk during the Duke's service to the British military mission to France, and was recommended by the Duke's staff to Churchill. He met most of the key Allied figures, from Franklin D. Roosevelt to Joseph Stalin. In addition to his Pitman shorthand speed of 150 words per minute, Kinna could take dictation straight on to a manual typewriter at 50 words per minute. In the rather cramped bathroom at Chartwell, Churchill would dictate to him from his bath, while Kinna typed in the only other place there was to sit, on top of the lavatory seat, with the typewriter on his knee. The typescript would be ready for the Prime Minister by the time his valet had towelled him dry.

At a Washington, D.C. meeting, Kinna told the BBC, "Churchill was in the bath and began dictating. He would submerge himself under the water every now and again and come up and carry on with the dictation. He was very absorbed in his work that morning and would not keep still for the valet to help dress him; he kept walking around the room speaking aloud. There was a rat-a-tat-tat on the door, and Churchill swung the door open to President Roosevelt! Churchill simply said that he had nothing to hide from Mr. President!"

Kinna turned down the opportunity to stay with Churchill after the war. He remained in government service, working for Foreign Secretary Ernest Bevin. Kinna died, aged 95, in 2009.

== Sources ==
- Stelzer, Cita (2019). Working With Winston: The Unsung Women Behind Britain's Greatest Statesman. London: Head of Zeus. ISBN 978-1-786-69587-1.
