= 1941 Birthday Honours =

British government recognitions

The King's Birthday Honours 1941 were appointments in the British Empire of King George VI to various orders and honours to reward and highlight good works by citizens of various countries. The appointments were made to celebrate the official birthday of The King, and were published on 6 June 1941.

The recipients of honours are displayed here as they were styled before their new honour, and arranged by honour, with classes (Knight, Knight Grand Cross, etc.) and then divisions (Military, Civil, etc.) as appropriate.

== British Empire ==
=== Viscount ===
- The Right Honourable Richard Bedford Bennett, DCL JP.

=== Baron ===
- The Right Honourable Sir Wilfrid Arthur Greene, OBE MC DCL , Master of the Rolls.
- Professor Frederick Alexander Lindemann, FRS, Personal Assistant to the Prime Minister. Professor of Experimental Philosophy, Oxford.
- The Right Honourable Sir Robert Gilbert Vansittart, GCB GCMG MVO, lately Chief Diplomatic Adviser, Foreign Office.

=== Privy Councillor ===
- Sir Miles Wedderburn Lampson, GCMG CB MVO, HM Ambassador Extraordinary and Plenipotentiary at Cairo and High Commissioner for the Sudan.
- The Honourable Vincent Massey, High Commissioner for the Dominion of Canada in the United Kingdom.

=== Baronet ===
- Francis D'Arcy Cooper, Chairman of Lever Bros., and Unilever Ltd. Chairman of the Executive Committee of the Export Council, Board of Trade.
- The Right Honourable Ronald Hibbert Cross, MP, High Commissioner Designate in the Commonwealth of Australia for His Majesty's Government in the United Kingdom.

=== Knight Bachelor ===
- Colonel Arthur Stanley Angwin, DSO MC TD, Engineer-in-Chief, General Post Office.
- Frederick George Binney, Export Manager of the United Steel Co. Ltd. Seconded for service with the Iron and Steel Control, Ministry of Supply. For special services in the supply of valuable war material.
- William Norman Birkett, KC, Chairman of the Advisory Committee appointed for the purposes of Defence Regulation 18B.
- Archibald Vyvyan Board, DSO MC, Director of Economy, Ministry of Supply; lately Controller of Molasses and Industrial Alcohol and of Plastics.
- John Francis Bodinnar, JP, Commercial Secretary, Ministry of Food.
- James Callander, Director, Vickers-Armstrongs Ltd., General Manager of the Works at Barrow-in-Furness and of the shipyard at Walker-on-Tyne.
- Dennis Leo Daley, Lord Mayor of Portsmouth. For services to Civil Defence.
- William Ewart Diggines, Chief Inspector of Taxes, Board of Inland Revenue.
- Ernest Basil Gibson, Town Clerk of Sheffield.
- Patrick Hennessy, a Member of the Advisory Council to the Minister of Aircraft Production.
- Edward Highton Hodgson, CB OBE, Second Secretary, Board of Trade.
- Colonel Edward Philip Le Breton, DL. For public services in Dorset. Chairman of the Dorset Education Committee.
- Percy Macdonald, Vice-Chairman of the Lancashire County Council.
- Alexander Stuart Murray Macgregor, OBE MD DPH LLD FRFPS(G) JP, Medical Officer of Health, Glasgow.
- Arthur Matthews, OBE, Chairman, Alloy & Special Steels Committee, Ministry of Aircraft Production.
- George Parker Morris, Air Raid Precautions Controller and Town Clerk, City of Westminster.
- Thomas David King Murray, KC, lately Chairman of the Scottish Land Court.
- John Phin, JP DL, lately Lord Provost of Dundee. District Commissioner for the Eastern District, Scotland.
- His Honour Judge William Procter, Judge of the County Courts.
- Frederick Ernest Rebbeck, JP DL, Chairman and Managing Director, Harland & Wolff Ltd.
- John Douglas Ritchie, MC, General Manager, Port of London Authority.
- Professor John Sebastian Bach Stopford, MBE MD ScD DSc FRS, Vice Chancellor of the University of Manchester.
- Reginald March Kesterson Turnbull, Adviser on Foreign Shipping, Ministry of War Transport.
- Colonel John Fisher Turner, CB DSO, lately Director of Works, Air Ministry.
- William Tweedley Wilson, Chief Officer of Supplies, London County Council; seconded to the Ministry of Supply as Director General of Equipment & Stores.

Dominions

- The Honourable Albert Louis Bussau, Agent-General in London for the State of Victoria.
- The Honourable Frederic William Eggleston, Chairman of the Grants Commission, Commonwealth of Australia.
- Arthur Stretton Gaye, CB OBE, United Kingdom Representative on the British Phosphate Commission.
- Robert Winton Gillespie, one of the founders of the Fairbridge Farm Schools in the Commonwealth of Australia. For public services.
- Claude Ernest Weymouth James, Agent-General in London for the State of Tasmania.
- Professor John Percival Vissing Madsen, DSc, Professor of Electrical Engineering, University of Sydney, and Chairman of the Radio Research Board, Commonwealth of Australia.

India

- Iqbal Ahmad, Chief Justice of the High Court of Judicature at Allahabad, United Provinces.
- Leonard Wilson, Chief Commissioner of Railways.
- Torick Ameer Ali, Puisne Judge of the High Court of Judicature at Fort William in Bengal.
- Mahamahopadhyaya Ganganath Jha, DLitt LLD, Indian Educational Service (Ret'd), lately Vice-Chancellor, Allahabad University.
- Basil John Gould, CMG CIE, Indian Political Service, Political Officer in Sikkim.
- Frederick Tymms, CIE MC, Director of Civil Aviation in India.
- Kenneth Grant Mitchell, CIE, Indian Service of Engineers, Consulting Engineer (Roads) to the Government of India.
- Frederick Stones, OBE, Member of the Legislative Council, Director, Messrs. E. D. Sassoon & Co. Ltd., Bombay.
- George Adolph Bambridge, Director, Messrs. Binny & Co. (Madras), Ltd., Madras.
- Vithal Narayan Chandavarkar, Barrister-at-Law, Managing Director, Messrs. N. Sirur & Co., Mill Agents, Bombay.
- Henry Guy Cooper, MC DCM, General Manager, Burmah-Shell Oil Storage & Distributing Co. of India, Ltd.
- Rai Bahadur Lala Gujjar Mal, Banker, Amritsar, Punjab.
- Khan Bahadur Haji Abdul Latif Haji Hajrat Khan, Sholapur City, Bombay.
- Kumararaja Muthiah Annamalai Muthiah Chettiar, of Chettinad, Madras.
- Manilal Balabhai Nanavati, Deputy Governor, Reserve Bank of India.
- Maharaja Pateshri Prasad Singh, of Balrampur, Taluqdar, Gonda District, United Provinces.
- Edward Bernard Pratt, Managing Director, Imperial Chemical Industries (India) Ltd.
- John Henry Swain Richardson, Director, Messrs. Andrew Yule & Co., Calcutta, Bengal.

Burma

- Archie Gerard Mosely, Indian Civil Service, Puisne Judge of the High Court of Judicature at Rangoon.
- John Edward Maurice Rowland, lately Chief Railway Commissioner, Burma.

Colonies, Protectorates, Etc.

- William Tait Bowie, OBE. For public services in the Nyasaland Protectorate.
- Maurice Vivian Camacho, Colonial Legal Service, Chief Justice, British Guiana.
- Philip Henry Manson-Bahr, CMG DSO FRCP. For services to tropical medicine and as Consulting Physician to the Colonial Office.
- Major Kenneth Elliston Poyser, DSO, Colonial Legal Service, Chief Justice, Federated Malay States.
- Major Hubert Craddock Stevenson, CMG OBE, Colonial Administrative Service, Chief Commissioner, Ashanti, Gold Coast.

=== Knights of the Thistle ===
- The Right Honourable Sir Archibald Henry Macdonald Sinclair, Bt CMG MP, Secretary of State for Air.

=== Order of the Bath ===
==== Knight Commander of the Order of the Bath (KCB) ====
Civil Division

- Lieutenant-Colonel (Honorary Colonel) Francis Henry Douglas Charlton Whitmore, CB CMG DSO TD, President, Territorial Army and Air Force Association of the County of Essex.
- Sir George Henry Gater, CMG DSO, Secretary, Ministry of Home Security.
- Henry Vaughan Markham, MC, Permanent Secretary, Admiralty.
- Sir (Evelyn) John Maude, KBE CB, Secretary, Ministry of Health.

==== Companion of the Order of the Bath (CB) ====
Civil Division

- Herbert Brittain, Principal Assistant Secretary, HM Treasury.
- James Temple Cotton, OBE, Director of Contracts, Ministry of Aircraft Production.
- Alan Edward Ellis, Parliamentary Counsel.
- Henry Stanley Gregory, Director of Establishments, Ministry of Supply.
- Lancelot Vernon Meadowcroft, Director of Contracts, Air Ministry.
- Major Desmond John Falkiner Morton, CMG MC, Personal Assistant to the Prime Minister.
- Eric Arthur Seal, lately Principal Private Secretary to the Prime Minister.
- Charles Allison Taylor, MC, Regional Director, London Telecommunications Region, General Post Office.
- John Mackay Thomson, Secretary, Scottish Education Department.
- Orlando Cyprian Williams, MC, Principal Clerk in the Committee and Private Bill Office, House of Commons.
- Frederick Arthur Whitaker, MEng MInstCE, Civil Engineer in Chief, Admiralty.
- Lieutenant-Colonel Clervaux Alexander Chaytor, DSO DL, Chairman, Territorial Army and Air Force Association of the North Riding of the County of York.
- Lieutenant-Colonel John Robert Sloan Leslie, TD DL, Chairman, Territorial Army and Air Force Association of the City of Glasgow.
- Lieutenant-Colonel (Honorary Colonel) Thomas William Pearson, DSO TD DL, Chairman, Territorial Army Association of the County of Monmouth.

=== Order of the Star of India ===
==== Knight Commander (KCSI) ====
- His Highness Maharaja Vikramsinha Rao Puar, Maharaja of Dewas, Senior Branch, Central India.
- Sir Andrew Gourlay Clow, CSI CIE, Indian Civil Service, Member of the Governor General's Executive Council.
- Sir Abraham Jeremy Raisman, CSI CIE, Indian Civil Service, Member of the Governor General's Executive Council.

==== Companion (CSI) ====
- Muhammad Saleh Akbar Hydari, CIE, Indian Civil Service, Representative of the Government of India on the Eastern Group Supply Council and lately Secretary to the Government of India in the Department of Labour.
- Lieutenant-Colonel John de la Hay Gordon, CIE OBE MC, Indian Political Service, resident in Mysore.
- Henry Foley Knight, CIE, Indian Civil Service, Adviser to the Governor of Bombay.
- Cyril Edgar Jones, CIE, Indian Civil Service, Secretary to the Government of India in the Finance Department.
- Eric Thomas Coates, CIE, Indian Civil Service, Financial Adviser, Military Finance, Government of India.
- Frederick Wynne Robertson, CIE, Indian Civil Service (Ret'd), Chairman, Public Service Commission, Bengal.
- Chandulal Madhavlal Trivedi, CIE OBE, Indian Civil Service, Officiating Chief Secretary to the Government of the Central Provinces and Berar.
- Thomas McElderby Lyle, CIE, Indian Service of Engineers, Chief Engineer, Eastern Canals, United Provinces.

=== Order of Saint Michael and Saint George ===
==== Knight Grand Cross of the Order of St Michael and St George (GCMG) ====
- Sir Andrew Caldecott, KCMG CBE, Governor and Commander-in-Chief of the Island of Ceylon.
- Sir Esmond Ovey, KCMG MVO, His Majesty's Ambassador Extraordinary and Plenipotentiary at Buenos Aires.

==== Knight Commander of the Order of St Michael and St George (KCMG) ====
- Frank Gill, OBE. For services rendered in the development of the telephone industry and of international telephony.
- Honorary Colonel George John Bell, CMG DSO VD, formerly Speaker of the House of Representatives, Commonwealth of Australia.
- Rear-Admiral Arthur Bromley, CMG CVO, Ceremonial and Reception Secretary, Dominions and Colonial Offices.
- Major Ralph Dolignon Furse, CMG DSO, Director of Recruitment (Colonial Service), Colonial Office.
- Henry Guy Pilling, CMG, Governor and Commander-in-Chief of the Island of Saint Helena.
- Henry Harold Scott, CMG MD FRCP, Director of the Bureau of Hygiene & Tropical Diseases, London.
- Ronald Ian Campbell, CB CMG, until recently His Majesty's Envoy Extraordinary and Minister Plenipotentiary at Belgrade.
- Godfrey Thomas Havard, CMG, until recently His Majesty's Consul-General at Beirut.

==== Companion of the Order of St Michael and St George (CMG) ====
- Commander Alexander Guthrie Denniston, CBE, Royal Naval Volunteer Reserve (Ret'd). Head of a Department of the Foreign Office.
- Sheffield Airey Neave, OBE , Assistant Director, Imperial Institute of Entomology.
- Geoffrey Frank Braddock, OBE, United Kingdom Trade Commissioner (Grade I) in Eire.
- Walter Crossfield Hankinson, OBE MC, Principal Secretary in the Office of the High Commissioner in Canada for His Majesty's Government in the United Kingdom.
- Captain the Honourable Frank Ernest Harris, DSO, Minister of Agriculture & Lands, Minister of Supply, Industry and Post-War Development, Southern Rhodesia.
- Frank Sandland Hone, MB BS. For public services in the State of South Australia.
- The Honourable James Hume Cook. For public services in the Commonwealth of Australia.
- The Honourable David John O'Keefe, Speaker, House of Assembly, State of Tasmania.
- Harold Beckett, Assistant Secretary, Colonial Office.
- Charles Henry Collins, Colonial Administrative Service, Deputy Chief Secretary, Ceylon.
- James Stevenson Fenton, OBE, Colonial Administrative Service, Secretary for Protectorate Affairs, Sierra Leone.
- John Fearby Campbell Haslam, MD FRCP DPH, Colonial Medical Service, Director of Medical services, Northern Rhodesia.
- George Brentnall Hebden, AMIEE, Postmaster-General, Kenya, Uganda and Tanganyika Territory.
- James Balfour Kirk, MB ChB DPH, Colonial Medical Service, Director, Medical and Health Department, Mauritius.
- John Stuart Macpherson, Colonial Administrative Service, Chief Secretary, Palestine.
- Gerald Power, Colonial Education Service, Director of Education, Gold Coast.
- Gilbert McCall Rennie, Colonial Administrative Service, Chief Secretary, Kenya.
- William Eric Halstead Scupham, MC, Colonial Administrative Service, Administrative Secretary, Tanganyika Territory.
- Harold Augustin Tempany, CBE DSc FIC, Agricultural Adviser to the Secretary of State for the Colonies.
- Andrew Barkworth Wright, CBE MC, Colonial Administrative Service, Colonial Secretary, Cyprus.
- Judge Hugh Oliver Holmes, KC MC, Procurator-General of the Mixed Court of Appeal, Alexandria.
- John Hall Magowan, OBE, of His Majesty's Commercial Diplomatic Service, seconded to the Export Credits Guarantee Department.
- Robert Cecil Mayall, DSO MC, Governor of the Blue Nile Province, Sudan.
- Philip Bouverie Bowyer Nichols, MC, an Acting Counsellor in the Foreign Office.
- Montague Bentley Talbot Paske Smith, CBE, until recently His Majesty's Envoy Extraordinary and Minister Plenipotentiary at Bogotá.
- William Stark Toller, OBE, His Majesty's Consul-General at Canton.
- Arthur Ferdinand Yencken, MC, Minister Plenipotentiary at His Majesty's Embassy in Madrid.

Honorary Companion

- Abubakr, Sultan of Sokoto, Nigeria.

=== Order of the Indian Empire ===
==== Knight Commander (KCIE) ====
- Sir Alexander Forbes Proctor Roger, lately Leader, Ministry of Supply Mission to India.
- Arthur Cunningham Lothian, CSI CIE, Indian Political Service, Resident for Rajputana and Chief Commissioner, Ajmer-Merwara.
- Edmund Currey Gibson, CIE, Indian Political Service, Resident for the States of Western India.
- Lieutenant-General Gordon Gray Jolly, CIE KHP, Indian Medical Service, Director General, Indian Medical Service.
- Colin Campbell Garbett, CSI CMG CIE FRGS, Indian Civil Service, Financial Commissioner, Revenue, Punjab.

==== Companion (CIE) ====
- Thomas Austin, Indian Civil Service, Chief Secretary to the Government of Madras, and acting Adviser to the Governor of Madras.
- Khan Bahadur Muzaffar Hussain, Member, Staff, Railway Board (Railway Department), Government of India.
- Frederick George Stephen Martin, MC MIME, Deputy Director-General, Engineering and Civil Production, Government of India in the Department of Supply.
- Ghulam Muhammad, Additional Secretary to the Government of India in the Department of Supply.
- Alfred Charles Turner, MBE, Indian Civil Service, Joint Secretary to the Government of India in the Finance Department.
- Rao Bahadur Vapal Pangunni Menon, Joint Secretary to the Governor-General (Reforms).
- Major-General Hugh Stott, OBE KHS, Indian Medical Service, Surgeon General with the Government of Madras and lately Inspector-General of Civil Hospitals, Bihar.
- Alexander Duncan, Agent and General Manager, Bengal Nagpur Railway Co., Calcutta.
- Lieutenant-Colonel Leslie Eric Barton, Indian Political Service, Resident for the Eastern States.
- Duncan MacLachlan, Indian Civil Service, Commissioner, Central Division, Poona, Bombay.
- William Douglas Tomkins, OBE, lately Secretary, Ministry of Supply Mission to India.
- John Philip Sargent, Educational Commissioner with the Government of India.
- Giles Frederick Squire, Indian Political Service, His Britannic Majesty's Consul General for Khorasan.
- Yeshwant Narayan Sukthankar, Indian Civil Service, Tea Controller for India.
- Cecil Edward Aitken, Indian Service of Engineers, Chief Engineer and Secretary to the Government of Bombay in the Public Works Department.
- Sri Diwan Bahadur Rasipur Varada Krishna Ayyar, Additional Secretary to the Government of Madras in the Public Department, and Secretary to the Madras Legislature.
- Kunwar Jasbir Singh, Barrister-at-Law, Secretary to the Government of the United Provinces in the Information Department.
- Lieutenant-Colonel Desmond Fitz-John Fitzmaurice, Royal Engineers (Ret'd), Master, Security Printing and Controller of Stamps.
- Lieutenant-Colonel Codanda Madiah Ganapathy, MC, Indian Medical Service, Director of Public Health, Madras.
- Lieutenant-Colonel George Verghese, Indian Medical Service, Director of Health and Inspector-General of Prisons, Orissa.
- Lieutenant-Colonel Cameron Macdonald Nicol, MD(Aberd.) DPH(Lond.), Indian Medical Service, lately Director of Public Health, Punjab.
- Hardit Singh Malik, OBE, Indian Civil Service, Indian Trade Commissioner in New York.
- John Cadwagan Powell-Price, Indian Educational Service, Director of Public Instruction, United Provinces.
- William Kirkpatrick, Indian Service of Engineers, Officiating Chief Engineer, Sind.
- Frank Herbert Graham Taylor, Indian Police, Deputy Inspector-General of Police, Central Provinces and Berar.
- Ernest William Cornish Wace, Indian Police, Deputy Inspector-General of Police, Punjab.
- Lieutenant-Colonel Mark Alleyne Nicholson, MB BS DPH(Lond.) MRCS LRCP, Indian Medical Service, Chief Medical Officer in Central India and Residency Surgeon, Indore.
- Rai Bahadur Mehr Chand Khanna, Member of the Legislative Assembly, North-West Frontier Province.
- William Meiklejohn, Indian Forest Service, Senior Conservator of Forests, Bengal.
- Arthur William Henry Dean, MC, Indian Service of Engineers, Superintending Engineer, Delhi.
- Cyril Frederick Chanington Beeson, Indian Forest Service, Forest Entomologist and Conservator of Forests, Government of India.
- Stanley Webb Johnson, OBE, Second Solicitor to the Government of India.
- Jehangir Jivaji Ghandy, General Manager of the Tata Iron & Steel Co. Ltd., Jamshedpur, Bihar.
- Bertie Aylmer Crampton Neville, Secretary and Treasurer, Imperial Bank of India, Calcutta, Bengal.
- Geoffrey William Tyson, Editor, Capital, Secretary of the Public Relations Sub-Committee and the Calcutta War Committee, Bengal.

=== Order of the British Empire ===
==== Knight Grand Cross of the Order of the British Empire (GBE) ====
Civil Division

- William Richard, Viscount Nuffield, OBE DCL . For public services.
- The Right Honourable Henry Bucknall, Baron Rushcliffe, CBE, Chairman of the Assistance Board.

==== Dame Commander of the Order of the British Empire (DBE) ====
Civil Division

- Myra Hess, CBE. For services to music.

==== Knight Commander of the Order of the British Empire (KBE) ====
Civil Division

- William Scott Douglas, CB, Under-Secretary, HM Treasury.
- Charles Jocelyn Hambro, DL, Director, Hambro's Bank Ltd. For special services in the supply of valuable war material.
- Robert John Sinclair, MBE, Director General of Army Requirements.
- Frank Newton Tribe, CB CBE, Deputy Secretary, Ministry of Labour & National Service.
- Robert Stanford Wood, CB, Deputy Secretary, Board of Education.
- Major William Alexander McCallum, CBE, a British subject resident in Buenos Aires.
- Sir Edward St. John Jackson, OBE, Lieutenant Governor of Malta.

Honorary Knight Commander

- His Highness Tunku Badlishah ibni Sultan Abdul Hamid Halimshah, CMG, Regent of Kedah.

==== Commander of the Order of the British Empire (CBE) ====
Civil Division

- Robert Henry Adcock, Town Clerk and Air Raid Precautions Controller, Manchester.
- Ralph Alsop, General Manager of Consett Iron Co. Ltd. Lately Deputy Controller of Iron and Steel.
- Professor Frederic Charles Bartlett, FRS, Member of the Flying Personnel Research Committee.
- Major Jack Becke, OBE, Chief Constable of Cheshire.
- Major George Purvis Bulman, OBE FRAeS, Director of Engine Development & Production, Ministry of Aircraft Production.
- Herbert Davis, Director of Oils & Fats, Ministry of Food.
- Alderman Walter Deacon, JP, President of the Pharmaceutical Society of Great Britain.
- Reginald Hector Franklin, Assistant Secretary, Ministry of Agriculture & Fisheries.
- James Alison Glover, OBE MD FRCP, lately Senior Medical Officer, Board of Education.
- Percy Good, Deputy Director, British Standards Institution. For services to Civil Defence.
- Charles Brazier Hains, MBE, Director of Supply, Air Raid Precautions Department, Ministry of Home Security.
- George Colvile Hayter Hames, Chairman, Devon War Agricultural Executive Committee.
- Alexander James Hendin, Special Director of Vickers-Armstrongs Ltd. Resident Manager of the company's shipyard at Walker-on-Tyne.
- Lindsey Kathleen Huxley, OBE, Chief Regional Administrator, Women's Voluntary Services for Civil Defence.
- Joseph Jones, Chief Constable of the County of Glamorgan. For services to Civil Defence.
- William Jones, Clerk of the Denbighshire County Council.
- Colonel William Martin Kay, CMG TD DL, Vice-Chairman of the Council of the British Legion (Scotland).
- John Crawford Knox, MB DPH, Honorary Consultant Adviser to the Secretary of State for Scotland in connection with the Emergency Hospitals Organisation.
- James Leek, Director and General Manager, BSA Guns Ltd.
- John Carruthers Little, lately President of the Amalgamated Engineering Union. For services to the Engineering Industry.
- Major Philip Elton Longmore, Clerk of the Hertfordshire County Council and Air Raid Precautions Controller.
- Alfred Jonathan Lyddon, OBE MInstCE, Deputy Chief Engineer, Ministry of War Transport.
- Arthur Massey, MD, Medical Officer of Health for Coventry.
- George Gibson Mercer, MC, Chairman of the Midlothian Agricultural Executive Committee.
- Samuel Ellison Minnis, Assistant Secretary, Board of Inland Revenue.
- Frederick Snyder Mitman, Controller, Sheet & Strip Light Alloy and Magnesium Control.
- Philip Robert Morris, MA, Director of Education for the County of Kent.
- Arthur Nicholls, Manager of the Constructive Department at HM Dockyard, Devonport.
- Councillor Frederick Arthur Parish, Chairman of the Emergency Committee, Bristol.
- Arthur Hampden Ronald Wastell Poyser, Assistant, Master in Lunacy, Supreme Court of Judicature.
- Augustus George Ralph, Deputy Assistant Commissioner, Metropolitan Police.
- Professor William Rennie, MA LittD LLD, Professor of Greek in the University of Glasgow.
- Horace Wilfrid Skinner, Air Raid Precautions Controller and County Clerk, Derbyshire.
- Theodore Easterway Thomas, General Manager (Operation), London Passenger Transport Board.
- Robert Cyril Thompson, Managing Director, Joseph L. Thompson & Sons Ltd., Shipbuilding Yard.
- Marmaduke Tudsbery Tudsbery, MInstCE, Civil Engineer, British Broadcasting Corporation.
- Alexander Williamson, MICE, Managing Director, William Beardmore & Co. Ltd. Chairman of the Ministry of Supply Gun Forging Committee.
- Charles Merllyn Woodford, OBE, Inspector-General of Waterguard, Board of Customs & Excise.
- Major Kenneth Morrison Bourne, MC, Commissioner of Police, Shanghai.
- Henry Augustus Chapman, a British subject resident in Tokyo.
- John Prichard, President of the Court of Appeal, Iraq.
- Ralph William Gordon Reed, OBE, Headmaster of the Victoria College, Alexandria.
- Noel Kenric Stevens Brodribb, OBE FIC, Inspector-General of Defence Works & Supplies, Commonwealth of Australia.
- William Alexander Elder, OBE FRCVS, Principal Veterinary and Agricultural Officer, Swaziland.
- Albert Charles Joyce, Assistant Secretary, Treasury, Commonwealth of Australia.
- Harris Munden Mosdell, MD, Secretary for Public Health & Welfare, Newfoundland.
- Albert William Shugg, MB BS. For professional and philanthropic services in the State of Tasmania.
- Aubrey Denzil Forsyth Thompson, Assistant Resident Commissioner and Government Secretary, Bechuanaland Protectorate.
- Roland Wilson, PhD, Commonwealth Statistician and Economic Adviser to the Treasury, Commonwealth of Australia.
- Henry Ward Lionel Kearns, lately Member, Ministry of Supply Mission to India.
- Cecil Ralph Townshend Congreve, Planter, Madras.
- Lieutenant-Colonel William Loftus Crawford, DSO, Planter, Mysore State.
- Rai Bahadur Norbhu Dhondup, OBE, British Trade Agent, Yatung, and Assistant to the Political Officer in Sikkim.
- William Robert Watt, Director, British India Corporation, Cawnpore.
- Colonel (Temporary Brigadier) Francis Arthur Guy Roughton, Indian Army (Ret'd), Inspector-General, Frontier Force, Burma.
- Charles Frederick Byrde Pearce, Indian Civil Service, Secretary to the Governor of Burma.
- Ronald Nesbitt-Hawes, Director-General, Burma Posts & Telegraphs.
- Professor Albert Victor Bernard, OBE MD DPH, Chief Government Medical Officer, Malta.
- Gwladys Helen, Baroness Delamere. For public services in Kenya.
- Commander Alfred Victor Pearce Ivey, RD, Royal Naval Reserve, Director of Marine, Nigeria.
- Lim Han Hoe, MB ChB. For public services in the Straits Settlements.
- Lo Man Kam. For public services in Hong Kong.
- Frederick Albert Mathias, OBE. For public services.
- Edward Vernon Wharton. For public services in Trinidad.
- Owen Franklin Wright, Colonial Police Service, Commissioner of Police, Jamaica.

==== Officer of the Order of the British Empire (OBE) ====
Civil Division

- Captain George Lugsdin Alexander, Master, Merchant Navy.
- Alexander Wilson Anderson, Chief Slaughter-house Supervisor, Ministry of Food.
- Theodore Ashley, HM Divisional Inspector of Mines for Scotland.
- Professor John Fleetwood Baker, MA ScD DSc, Scientific Adviser, Research & Experiments Branch, Ministry of Home Security.
- William Ebsworth Baker, General Manager and Air Raid Precautions Controller of the Metropolitan Borough of Bermondsey.
- Evan Baldwin, Principal of the Stockton-on-Tees Technical School.
- Harry Joshua Barker, Manager of the Admiralty Section of the Coventry Gauge & Tool Co.
- Major Edwin George Goodson Bax, Co-ordinating Officer Rescue Service, London Civil Defence Region.
- Thomas Beacall, an Assistant Comptroller in the Patent Office, Board of Trade.
- Harold Bedale, Town Clerk and Air Raid Precautions Controller, Borough of Hornsey, Middlesex.
- Charles Walter Bloor, Deputy Air Raid Precautions Controller, Birmingham.
- Alderman Arthur George Bottomley, Air Raid Precautions Controller, Borough of Walthamstow.
- Richard Charles Bowden, PhD MSc MIChemE FIC FCS, Assistant Director of Ordnance Factories, Ministry of Supply.
- Councillor Edward Errol Gaunt Bradbury, Commandant, Sheffield Auxiliary Fire Service.
- Janet Beatrice Breese, Chairman of the North Wales Federation of Nursing Associations.
- Captain Arthur Tilletson Brown, RD, Royal Naval Reserve (Retd.), Master, Merchant Navy.
- Captain David Webster Brown, Master, Merchant Navy.
- Herbert Bruckshaw, Chief Accountant, Ministry of Aircraft Production.
- Aubrey Francis Burke, Ministry of Aircraft Production representative in a Civilian Repair Organisation.
- Colin Campbell, Town Clerk, Air Raid Precautions Controller and Public Assistance Officer of Plymouth.
- Ethel Cassie, MD DPH, Senior Assistant Medical Officer of Health for Maternity and Child Welfare, Birmingham.
- Sir Albert Clavering, Director of Cinema Van Propaganda, National Savings Committee.
- Percy Walter Cox, MBE, Executive Officer, Kent War Agricultural Executive Committee.
- George Francis Darlow, Air Raid Precautions Controller and Town Clerk, West Bromwich.
- Vera Dart, Regional Administrator, Manchester, Women's Voluntary Services for Civil Defence.
- George Graham Davison, Chief Engineer, Merchant Navy.
- Sidney William Drinkwater, MBE, Principal, Home Office.
- Andrew Leslie Dykes, MD, Hospital Officer, Southern Region, Emergency Medical Service.
- Captain Arthur Reginald Emmott, Master, Merchant Navy.
- Captain William James Escudier, Master, Merchant Navy.
- David Graham Evans, Commandant, Liverpool Auxiliary Fire Service.
- George William Ferguson, JP, Commandant, Foot Unit, Special Constabulary, Edinburgh. For services to Civil Defence.
- Alexandra Fisher, MA DLitt, lately Headmistress, Bishop Auckland County School for Girls.
- Captain Ernest Fisher, Master, Merchant Navy.
- Charles Harington Gordon Forbes, Principal Clerk and Establishment Officer, Principal Probate Registry.
- Arthur Gordon Francis, DSc FIC, Deputy Government Chemist.
- Major Ian Fraser, MD MCh FRCS, Commissioner, St. John Ambulance Brigade, Northern Ireland District.
- Harry Percy Gee, JP, Chairman, Leicester War Savings Campaign Committee.
- James Charles Gilbert, Clerk to the London Insurance Committee.
- Councillor Douglas Gosling, JP, Chief Air Raid Warden, Manchester.
- Frederick Gould, National Organiser, National Union of Boot and Shoe Operatives.
- Member of the War Service Grants Advisory Committee, Ministry of Pensions.
- Captain Edward Martin Grainger, Master, Trinity House Pilotage Service.
- John Walton Greener, Chief Engineer, Merchant Navy.
- John Richard Gregson, JP, Mayor of Gosport. For services to Civil Defence.
- Herbert John Grinyer, Chief Engineer, Merchant Navy.
- Oscar Augustus Hall, Assistant Director, Requisitioning Branch, Ministry of War Transport.
- Kathleen Mary Halpin, Regional Administrator of Women's Voluntary Services in the London Civil Defence Region.
- Robert Charles Hannaford, Chief Constable, Metropolitan Police.
- William Henry Harper, House Governor, Royal Hospital, Wolverhampton. Group Officer for the Wolverhampton District in the Emergency Medical Scheme.
- Percy Harris, Chief Engineer, Maintenance Command, Royal Air Force.
- Major Joseph Hawksley, MInstCE MIMechE MInstWE, Water Works Engineer and Manager, Southampton Corporation Waterworks Undertaking. For services to Civil Defence.
- Captain Andrew Henry, Master, Merchant Navy.
- Wilfrid John Hewkley, MBE FAI, Deputy Director of Lands & Accommodation, Ministry of Works & Buildings.
- William David Hogarth, Secretary to the London Council of Social Service. For services to Civil Defence.
- Rex Hope West Hope, MC, Headquarters Liaison Officer and Director of the Overseas Section of the War Organisation of the British Red Cross Society and Order of St. John of Jerusalem.
- Martin Langston Howman, Procurator Fiscal, Perth.
- Charles Cecil Hughes, Senior Examiner, Board of Inland Revenue.
- Josiah Stanley Jackson, Superintending Inspector, Board of Customs & Excise.
- Captain John Alexander Glen Johnston, Master, Merchant Navy.
- Captain William Jones, Master, Merchant Navy.
- Cyril Jowsey, Superintendent of the Admiralty Chart Establishment.
- Samuel Wallace Kennedy, City Commandant, Special Constabulary, Londonderry.
- Joseph Kennell, MBE, Superintendent of Printing & Supplies, Foreign Office.
- Ernest Charles Ashley Larkins, Financial Adviser, Eastern Command, War Office.
- Charles Hector Lefebure, Deputy Accountant General, Ministry of Labour & National Service.
- Captain Thomas Lockett, Deputy Air Raid Precautions Controller, Stoke-on-Trent.
- Archibald Grassam Logan, Treasurer of the Burgh of Falkirk; Organising Secretary of the Ironfounding Workers' Association.
- Charles John Macdonald, Principal, Ministry of War Transport.
- James Macdonald, MBE, Chief Constable and Air Raid Precautions Controller, Arbroath.
- Gregor MacGregor, MA FEIS, Director of Education, Fife County Council.
- Arthur Johnstone McIntosh, Chief Constable, Dunbarton County Police Force.
- George Woodfin Marks, Air Raid Precautions Controller and Town Clerk of Canterbury.
- Captain William Allan Martin, Master, Merchant Navy.
- James Mason, Regional Officer, Assistance Board.
- James Robinson Stirling Middlewood, JP, Vice-Chairman of the Durham County Emergency Committee.
- Captain Ernest Edward Moore, Master, Merchant Navy.
- Captain James Tourie Muir, Master, Merchant Navy.
- George Henry Murray, Sub-District Manager, Greenock District, Ministry of War Transport Regional Organisation.
- Wilfred Mylrea, Chief Engineer, Merchant Navy.
- John Basil Nevitt, General Manager, Ammunition Department, Imperial Chemical Industry Metals Ltd.
- John Walter Nicholls, Head of a section, Ministry of Economic Warfare.
- Captain John Nicolson, Master, Merchant Navy.
- Charles Archibald Kensit Norman, Assistant Solicitor, India Office.
- Ernest Frederick Nunns, Surveyor, General Post Office.
- Helen Georgiana Nussey, lately Principal Organiser, Children's Care Department, London County Council.
- Horace William Oclee, DL, Secretary, Territorial Army and Air Force Association, East Lancashire.
- John Ormerod, Air Raid Precautions Controller and Chief Constable of Wallasey.
- James Leonard Palmer, Regional Information Officer, South West Region, Ministry of Information.
- William Palmer, Chief Constable of Margate.
- Captain Vincent Power, Master, Merchant Navy.
- Captain David Prowse, Captain, British Overseas Airways Corporation.
- Robert Paton Ramsay, JP, Director of Welfare, Glasgow. For services to Civil Defence.
- Captain Robert Smith Riley, Master, Merchant Navy.
- Thomas Ritchie Rodger, MD ChB FRCS(Ed) JP, Chairman of the Hull and District Juvenile Advisory Committee.
- Kathleen Ryder Runton, Chief Billeting Officer for the Ilkley Urban District Council, Women's Voluntary Services Evacuation Organiser for the County of the West Riding of Yorkshire.
- Captain Frederick William Charles Russell, Master, Merchant Navy.
- Mysie Sargent, County Director of the British Red Cross Society, Norfolk Branch, Chief Executive Officer of the Joint War Organisation of the British Red Cross Society and Order of St. John of Jerusalem, Norfolk.
- John Alexander Scott, MD DPH, Medical Officer of Health, Metropolitan Borough of Fulham. For services to Civil Defence.
- Councillor Thomas John Sillitoe, JP, Mayor and Chairman of the Emergency Committee, Metropolitan Borough of Shoreditch.
- Councillor Einar Skjold, JP, Chairman of the Erith Local Employment Committee.
- Captain Stanley William Smith, Master, Merchant Navy.
- Bernard Donald Storey, Town Clerk and Air Raid Precautions Controller, Norwich.
- William Taylor, Chief Public Assistance Officer, Surrey County Council. For services to Civil Defence.
- Captain Brice Daniel Thomas, Master, Merchant Navy.
- Edwin Tilley, Air Raid Precautions Controller, and Chief Constable, Wolverhampton.
- Captain John William Townsley, Master, Merchant Navy.
- Keith Webster, Chief Constable and Air Raid Precautions Sub-Controller, Gravesend; Chief Officer of the Gravesend Fire Brigade.
- Wilfrid Leicester Whitaker, Superintendent of the Operative Department, Royal Mint.
- Daniel David Williams, JP, Commandant, Swansea Auxiliary Fire Service.
- Hubert Cecil Maurice Williams, MRCS LRCP DPH, Medical Officer of Health, Southampton. For services to Civil Defence.
- Captain Ambrose Williamson, Master, Merchant Navy
- Thomas Bowman, a British subject, formerly resident in Greece.
- George Wadham Bruce Heathcote, a British subject resident in San Francisco.
- Leslie Charles Hughes-Hallett, formerly His Majesty's Consul at Copenhagen, now at Guatemala.
- Edgar James Joint, His Majesty's Consul-General at Leopoldville.
- Francis Gerard Kinsella, His Majesty's Consul at Canakkale, previously at Benghazi.
- Reginald Godfrey Micklam, a British subject resident in Tangier.
- William Hacket Mundie, a British subject resident in Bangkok.
- Anna Frederica Bage, MSc JP. For public services in the Commonwealth of Australia.
- Harry Russell Bruorton, Manager of the British South Africa Company's ranch at Lobatsi, Chairman of the Central Committee of the War Fund, Bechuanaland Protectorate.
- Daniel Victor Fleming, MIE (Aust.), Commissioner of Highways, State of South Australia.
- Julia, Lady Horwood. For devoted work for the social welfare of the community, Newfoundland.
- Herbert Douglas Howie, President, Dried Fruits Board, State of South Australia.
- Frank (James Francis) Hurley, Official War Photographer with the Australian Imperial Force.
- Honorary Colonel Charles Henry Lamb, MC. For services to the Red Cross organisation in the Commonwealth of Australia.
- John William George McKenzie. For services to the Returned Sailors' and Soldiers' League, Commonwealth of Australia.
- Gordon Ross Milne. For social welfare and philanthropic services in Southern Rhodesia.
- Alexander Joseph Monger. For public services in the Commonwealth of Australia.
- Geoffrey Musgrave, General Manager, Chrome Mines, Selukwe, Southern Rhodesia. For public services.
- John Roger Orr, Honorary Secretary of the Scottish Branch, Empire Societies' War Hospitality Committee.
- William Scott, MBE, a retired trader of Mafeteng, Basutoland. For charitable and patriotic services.
- Sydney Talbot Smith, Chairman of the Literary Pensions Fund, Commonwealth of Australia.
- Frank Thomas Sprange, Accountant, Office of the High Commissioner in London for the Commonwealth of Australia.
- Elizabeth Ann Valentine Sterne, JP. For social welfare services in the Commonwealth of Australia.
- Charles Taylor, Deputy Commissioner in Western Australia of the Department of Repatriation & War Pensions, Commonwealth of Australia.
- Bertie Francis Wright, Official Secretary, Office of the High Commissioner in London for Southern Rhodesia.
- Lieutenant-Colonel Thomas Howard Battye, Director of Statistics, Government of India in the Department of Supply.
- Khambadkone Bhawanishankar Rao, lately Deputy Financial Adviser, Military Finance, Government of India.
- Arthur Lowe Collet, Registrar, Original Side, Calcutta High Court, Bengal.
- Narasingha Malla Ugal Sanda Deb, Zamindar, Jhargram, Midnapore District, Bengal.
- Eric Edmund Leigh Grundy, Principal, East Indian Railway Technical School, Jamalpur.
- Captain Mervyn Stockton Harvey Jones, Guardian to the Maharajkumar of Udaipur (Mewar) and lately Guardian and Tutor to His Highness the Maharaja of Dhar.
- Lieutenant-Colonel Joseph Martin Reeves Hennessy, LRCP&S (Edin.) DTM&H (Lond.) Indian Medical Service Civil Surgeon, Jubbulpore, Central Provinces and Berar.
- Thomas Ralph Sneyd Kynnersley, MC MInstCE, Chief Engineer, Concrete Association of India, Bombay.
- Tolaram Jethanand Mirchandani, Superintending Engineer, Electricity Department, Madras.
- Har Govind Misra, Proprietor, Misra Hosiery Mills, Cawnpore, United Provinces.
- Edward Penderel Moon, Indian Civil Service, Secretary to the Governor of the Punjab.
- Charles Henryde Vere Moss, Indian Police, Superintendent of Police, Sind.
- John Patrick Nicholson, Collector and District Magistrate, Budaun, United Provinces.
- Khan Bahadur Shaikh Nur Muhammad, Deputy Commissioner, Lyallpur, Punjab.
- Raje Lakhamgauda Basav Prabhu, Sar Desai, Barrister-at-Law, Sar Desai of Vantmuri, Belgaum District, Bombay.
- Frank Henry Charles Raynor, Indian Police, Assistant to the Inspector-General of Police, Orissa.
- Steven Noel Russell, Indian Civil Service, Deputy Commissioner, Singhbhum, Bihar.
- John Charles Liddell O'Neil Shaw, Indian Police, Senior Superintendent of Police, Peshawar, North-West Frontier Province.
- Major Frederick Augustus Berrill Sheppard, Indian Medical Service, District Medical Officer, Madura, Madras.
- Benjamin Alexander Smellie, Deputy Commissioner, Central Provinces and Berar.
- John Rouse Stapleton, Station Director, All India Radio, Calcutta.
- Cecil Owen Tattersall, ARCSO FIC, Assistant Chief Inspector of Stores & Clothing, Cawnpore.
- Major George Frederick Taylor, Indian Army (12th Frontier Force Regiment), Commandant, Kurram Militia, North-West Frontier Province.
- Humphrey Trevelyan, Indian Political Service, Deputy Commissioner, Bahawalpur, and lately Secretary to the Resident in Mysore and Chief Commissioner, Coorg.
- Cadambi Sheshachar Venkatachar, Indian Civil Service, lately Agent to the Government of India in British Malaya.
- Harold Willcocks, Indian Service of Engineers, Superintending Engineer, Second Circle, Central Public Works Department.
- Alexander Andrew Wilson, General Manager, Messrs. Mazagon Dock Ltd., Bombay.
- Captain Edmund Arabin Wimberley, Royal Engineers, Deputy Mint Master, Bombay.
- Khan Bahadur Maulvi Zafar Hasan, lately Superintendent, Archaeological Survey of India, Northern Circle, Agra.
- U Than Tin, Burma Civil Service, Secretary to the Government of Burma in the Finance Department.
- Reginald Gordon Bathgate Prescott, Indian Police, Commissioner of Police, Rangoon.
- Edward Conway Baker, Colonial Administrative Service, Provincial Commissioner, Tanganyika Territory.
- George Hodgson Bell, Government Printer, Uganda Protectorate.
- Paul Boffa, MD, District Commissioner, Malta.
- Charles Rice Butler, Colonial Education Service, Principal, Higher College, Yaba, Nigeria.
- Lieutenant-Colonel Herbert James Lawrence Cavenaugh, ED, Director of Prisons, Gold Coast.
- George Nicolas Chryssafinis. For public services in Cyprus.
- Ralph Gregory Collins. For public services in the Bahama Islands.
- Cissie Cooray, MBE, for social services in Ceylon.
- Professor Thomas Herbert Davey, MD, Director of the Sir Alfred Lewis Jones Research Laboratory, Sierra Leone.
- Lindsay Pierrepoint Downer. For public services in Jamaica.
- Harry Brown Hetherington, MD, Colonial Medical Service, Senior Medical Officer, British Solomon Islands Protectorate.
- Mariman Munchershaw Hodivalla, MB BS DPH, Medical Officer of Health, Aden.
- Gerald William Kenyon-Slaney, Colonial Administrative Service, District Officer, Nyasaland Protectorate.
- Barclay Leechman, Colonial Administrative Service, District Officer, Tanganyika Territory.
- Herbert Arthur Lord. For social services in the Straits Settlements.
- John MacIntyre, Municipal Engineer, Mombasa, Kenya.
- William Alexander MacNie, District Commissioner, British Guiana.
- Thomas Edward Pennington. For public services in Gibraltar.
- Arnold-Morgan Punnet. For public and philanthropic services in Saint Vincent.
- Sydney John Saint, MSc PhD FIC, Colonial Agricultural Service, Director of Agriculture, Barbados.
- Major Ludlow Sealey-King, Colonial Administrative Service, District Officer, Nigeria.
- Charles Bernard Smith, Secretary to Government and Director of Education, Seychelles.
- John Thorn. For public services in Northern Rhodesia.
- Owen Meredith Tweedy, Public Information Officer, Palestine.

Honorary Officers

- Shabetay Levy, MBE, Chairman of the Haifa Municipality Commission.
- Sheikh Mustafa Effendi Al-Khairi, MBE, Mayor of Ramie, Palestine.

==== Member of the Order of the British Empire (MBE) ====
Civil Division

- Marie Adami, Censor, Postal Censorship Branch, Liverpool, Ministry of Information.
- Harold Humphrey Allen, Staff Officer, Ministry of Aircraft Production.
- Councillor Annie Templeton Anderson, Area Organiser, Women's Voluntary Services for Civil Defence, Western Dumbartonshire.
- Captain Caleb Ashton, Master, Merchant Navy.
- Major Charlie Creswick Atkinson, MC, Air Raid Precautions Officer and Chief Warden, Borough of Stoke Newington.
- James Eric Austin, Air Raid Precautions Officer and Chief Warden, County Borough of East Ham.
- Harold Ayrey, Honorary Secretary, South Shields Savings Committee.
- Captain John Marshall Bailey, MC, Air Raid Precautions Officer, Rushden Urban District Council.
- Myra Beal, Private Secretary to the United Kingdom High Commissioner in the Commonwealth of Australia.
- James Hentsch Blackney, Chief Air Raid Warden, Bristol.
- Councillor Percival Walter Blanchard, Joint Chairman of the Southampton Production Defence Committee.
- George Robert Bolton, Controller, Royal Observer Corps.
- Cornelia Frances Eileen Bower, Headquarters Organiser, Women's Land Army.
- Robert Bowman, Firemaster, Paisley. For services to Civil Defence.
- Ethel Margaret Spratt Bowring, Appeals Secretary, British Red Cross Society.
- Secretary, British Red Cross and Order of St. John Comforts Collection Committee.
- Charles Christopher Boylan, First Mate, Merchant Navy.
- Lily Boys, County Organiser, Women's Voluntary Services for Civil Defence, Lindsey, Lincolnshire.
- Arthur Bramley, Chief Officer, Merchant Navy.
- Robert Brand, Superintendent and Deputy Chief Constable, Berwickshire.
- Samuel Edwin Britten, Secretary of the British Ship Adoption Society.
- Edmund Ernest Stockwell Brown, Executive Officer, Post Office Stores Department, London.
- Richard Bryan, Chief Engineer, Merchant Navy.
- Elizabeth Bullivant, Matron of the Birmingham Accident Hospital & Rehabilitation Centre. For services to Civil Defence.
- Thomas Carlyle, Radio Officer, Merchant Navy.
- Harold Gladstone Casey, Regional Executive, Birmingham, British Broadcasting Corporation.
- Geoffrey Edward Caswell, MC, Senior Staff Officer, Air Ministry.
- Sidney James Chamberlain, DFC, Senior Clerk, Metropolitan Police.
- Rowland Charlton, Headmaster, Andover Senior Boys Council School.
- Thomas Ignatius Clancy, Chief Clerk, Finance Branch, Home Office.
- Gilbert Russell Colvin, Secretary of the Boot Manufacturers Federation.
- Edith Mary Palmer, Baroness Congleton, Assistant County Organiser for South Hampshire, Women's Voluntary Services for Civil Defence.
- John Sydney Copeland, District Commandant, Special Constabulary, Northern Ireland.
- George Corder, First Class Clerk, Official Solicitor's Department, Supreme Court of Judicature.
- Helen Amy Corser, JP, Lady County Superintendent for Shropshire, St. John Ambulance Brigade.
- Ian Malcolm Cowan, ASAA, Borough Treasurer, Margate.
- Dorothie George Crombie, Centre Organiser, Camberwell Women's Voluntary Services for Civil Defence.
- Ronald Geoffrey Crowther, Commandant, Wakefield Auxiliary Fire Service.
- Christopher Dalgliesh, FSI, County Valuer, Berkshire County Council.
- Fred Davenport, Honorary Secretary, Heckmondwike Savings Committee.
- George Davie, Food Executive Officer, Ministry of Food.
- Olwen Davies, Superintendent of Typists, Ministry of Health.
- Ernest Edward Dick, Chief Engineer, Merchant Navy.
- Richard Joseph Dowling, Radio Officer, Merchant Navy.
- Richard Spencer Dring, Chief Engineer, Merchant Navy.
- Captain Alexander Moore Dundas, Master, Merchant Navy.
- James Knight Dunster, Superintendent, Air Raid Precautions Rescue Parties, County of Somerset.
- Harold Franklin Dyson, Deputy Borough Engineer, Great Yarmouth. For services to Civil Defence.
- John Bridge Fenlon, Assistant Postmaster, Liverpool.
- Captain Alexander Tennent Mackintosh Berney-Ficklin, MC, Air Raid Precautions Officer for the County of Norfolk.
- Cecil Charles Fisher, Senior Shipping Assistant, Ministry of War Transport.
- William Fisk, FSAA, Honorary Secretary, Maidstone Savings Committee.
- Anne Daker Fletcher, Censor, Postal Censorship Branch, London, Ministry of Information.
- Councillor Stanley Foster, Air Raid Precautions Sub-Controller and Chief Air Raid Warden, Grantham.
- Captain Dugald Brown Galbraith, Master, Northern Lighthouse Service.
- Alderman Herbert Gauntlett, Chairman, Wembley Savings Committee.
- Glen George, Chief Air Raid Warden, Aberdare Area, County of Glamorgan.
- George Edgar Gibson, Chief Assistant to the Transport Commissioner, Metropolitan Region.
- Bertha Mary Grainger, Assistant District Officer, Assistance Board.
- Gilbert Gray, Honorary Secretary, Stirlingshire Local Savings Committee.
- John Scott Grosvenor, Higher Executive Officer, Ministry of Aircraft Production.
- Captain James William Hammill, Master, Merchant Navy.
- Francis John Heritage, Staff Officer, Officer of the Parliamentary Counsel.
- Charles Frederick Hill, Controller, Royal Observer Corps.
- Rose Ethel Kathleen Hill, Personal Secretary to the Prime Minister.
- Louis Albert Hill, Chairman of the Walham Green Local Employment Committee.
- Thomas Henry Hitt, Officer-in-Charge, Regional Store, Ministry of Home Security.
- Frederick Holmes, Chief Inspector, Bournemouth Telephone Area.
- Harry Stanley Horn, Radio Officer, Merchant Navy.
- Philip Hudis, Staff Officer, Ministry of Home Security.
- Kathleen Frances Allington-Hughes, JP, Member of the Wrexham Juvenile Advisory Committee.
- George Sherriff Hussey, MC AMInstT, Assistant to the Vice-President London Midland & Scottish Railway Co. Ltd. For services to Civil Defence.
- John Campbell Sutherland Miller Hutchison, First Class Officer, Ministry of Labour & National Service.
- Elizabeth Thomson Hyslop, Senior Staff Officer, Ministry of Pensions.
- Thomas Harold Jenks, Chief Inspector, Buckinghamshire County Council.
- Joseph Jenkyn Jones, Staff Officer, Ministry of Supply.
- Walter Keig, Head of the Food Control Division of the Government Office, Isle of Man.
- Dorothy Kenworthy, County Secretary, British Red Cross Society, Cheshire Branch.
- Robert Inglis Kinnear, in charge of the Electrical Department, John Brown & Company Ltd.
- George Robson Kirkup, Air Raid Precautions Sub-Controller of the North Teesside Air Raid Precautions services and Superintendent of Police.
- Percy George Knapman, FIC, Superintendent, Royal Gunpowder Factory, Waltham Abbey.
- Doris Knott, Matron, Westbourne Day Nursery. For services to Civil Defence.
- Councillor James Edward Lane. For many years Honorary Treasurer of The Royal Naval Benevolent Trust.
- Robert Muir Lang, County Public Assistance Officer, Argyll.
- Percy William Lawton, Senior Staff Officer, Ministry of Health.
- Councillor Henry Foster Lee, JP, Chief Air Raid Warden and Chairman, Seaham Urban District Council Walter Lee, Works Manager, Linotype & Machinery Ltd.
- Joseph George Leggett, Senior Staff Clerk, Ministry of Labour & National Service.
- Councillor Robert Owen Lloyd, Leader of the Air Raid Precautions Rescue Corps, Birkenhead.
- Phoebe Sybil Hansel Lochrane, Chief Woman Air Raid Warden, Derby. Organiser, Derby & County of Derbyshire, Women's Voluntary Services for Civil Defence.
- Walter Wolfenden Lockwood, Staff Officer, Board of Inland Revenue.
- Harold Leslie Lowton, Senior Staff Clerk, War Office.
- Gavin Colquhoun McArthur, Air Raid Precautions Co-ordinating Officer, Glasgow.
- Alfred Micklethwait, District Postmaster, South Eastern District Office.
- Leonard Midgley, Superintendent, Sheffield City Police Force.
- John Henry William Mills, Senior Ship Surveyor, Ministry of War Transport.
- Captain Ernest Francis Milton, Master, Merchant Navy.
- David Moffat, District Officer, Assistance Board.
- Albert Paterson Muirhead, Chief Engineer, Merchant Navy.
- Herbert Neaverson, Chief Air Raid Precautions Organising Officer, Huddersfield.
- Albert Denton Ogden, Chief Sanitary Inspector, Chelmsford Rural District Council.
- Jack Vickerman Oldfield, AMInstCE AMIMechE, Borough Engineer, Grimsby. For services to Civil Defence.
- Walter Oldham, Senior Staff Officer, Ministry of Supply.
- Herbert Henry Palmer, JP, Honorary Secretary, Morecambe and Heysham Savings Committee.
- Francis Ralph Parry, Chief Superintendent, Lancashire Constabulary.
- Joseph Barr Paterson, AMInstCE, Engineering Inspector, Department of Health for Scotland.
- James Craig Pattison, Assistant Chief Constable, City of Dundee.
- Samuel Pattison, Officer, Board of Customs & Excise.
- William Lisle Pattison, Chief Officer, Merchant Navy.
- Harold Pearson, Superintendent, Wokingham Rural District Fire Brigade. For services to Civil Defence.
- Alexander Philip, Honorary Secretary, West Renfrewshire Local Savings Committee.
- Jessie Travers Platt, JP, Chairman of the Women's Sub-Committee of the Newcastle Local Employment Committee.
- Winifred Elizabeth Pollott, Accountant, Harrogate, General Post Office.
- Archibald Stanley Pratten, Chief Officer, Greenock Fire Brigade. For services to Civil Defence.
- Olive Sibella Prentice, ARRC, Acting County Director, County of London Branch, British Red Cross Society.
- William Victor Talbot Price, Staff Officer, Ministry of Food.
- Harry Priestly, Chief Sanitary Inspector, and Evacuation Officer, Blackpool.
- Charles Edward Pye, Chief Air Raid Warden, Weymouth.
- Henry Charles Quincey, Superintendent, Metropolitan Police.
- Gervase Rendell, Senior Staff Officer, Civil Engineer-in-Chief's Department, Admiralty.
- Walter Riggs, MIEE, Honorary Secretary, Aldeburgh Station, Royal National Lifeboat Institution.
- Patrick Angus Riordan, Radio Officer, Merchant Navy.
- Ralph Groves Roberts, Director of Public Assistance and Billeting Officer, Cardiff.
- Elizabeth Robertson, Headmistress, Evered Avenue Central Senior Girls' School, Liverpool.
- Arthur Lister Robinson, Chief Air Raid Warden, Peterborough.
- John Selby Robinson, Stationery & Printing Officer, Air Ministry.
- Francis Reginald Rider Rudman, Air Raid Precautions Sub-Controller, Chipping Sodbury Division, Gloucestershire.
- Captain Denis Arthur Alfred Russell, Master, Merchant Navy.
- Margaret Muriel Sanders, JP, Centre Leader, Cardiff Women's Voluntary Services for Civil Defence.
- George Wright Sarll, Clerical Officer, Board of Inland Revenue.
- Harry Saunders, Superintendent Relieving Officer for the County of Kent. For services to Civil Defence.
- William Frederick Saxton, Quality Manager, Armstrong Siddeley Motors Ltd.
- George Scantlebury, Honorary Secretary, Plymouth Branch, Royal National Lifeboat Institution.
- Captain Peter Scott, Master, Northern Lighthouse Service.
- Elizabeth Scurlock, Centre Organiser, Jarrow Women's Voluntary Services for Civil Defence.
- Percy Cecil Shapley, Chairman, Newton Heath Sub-Committee of the Manchester Local Employment Committee.
- William John Shaw, JP FEIS, Headmaster of the Central Public School, Inverness.
- Gilbert David Shepherd, JP, Chief Air Raid Warden, Cardiff.
- William Shepherd, Chief Superintendent, Kent County Constabulary.
- Mary Size, Governor, HM Prison Aylesbury.
- George Smart, Chairman, Western Area, Associated Road Operators.
- Alexander Smith, Chief Engineer, Merchant Navy.
- Clarence Harold Smith, Air Raid Precautions Officer, Hove.
- Ethel Smith, Personal Secretary to the late Lord Stamp, Chairman of the London Midland & Scottish Railway Co.
- Leslie Stephen Smith, Staff Officer, Colonial Office.
- Violet Mary Martin Smith, JP, County Organiser, Women's Voluntary Services for Civil Defence, and President of the Women's Institutes, Hertfordshire.
- Hubert Lane Spencer, Senior Staff Officer, Board of Trade.
- Wilfrid Whitehouse Spruce, Deputy Principal, Ministry of Education, Northern Ireland.
- William Stoddard, Chief Accountant, Ministry of Works & Buildings.
- Herbert John Lewis Stone, Deputy Director of Social Welfare, Bristol. For services to Civil Defence.
- Albert Patrick Loisel Sullivan, MM, Chief Superintendent, London Fire Brigade.
- Florence Charlotte Laura Sutton, Borough Organiser, Ramsgate Women's Voluntary Services for Civil Defence.
- James Duncombe Sutton, Superintendent, West Ham County Borough Emergency Mortuary.
- Captain George Bain Swanson, Master, Merchant Navy.
- Gladys Gorton Swift, Chief Superintendent of Typists, HM Treasury.
- Captain John James Thain, Master, Merchant Navy.
- Jessie Ellen Thomas, Headmistress, Peckham Meetinghouse Lane School for Cripples.
- George Linklater Thomson, Honorary Secretary, Stromness (Orkney) Branch, Royal National Lifeboat Institution.
- Winifred Laura Butler Tower, Deputy County Organiser and Area Organiser for East Kent, Women's Voluntary Services for Civil Defence.
- Margaret Emmie Vernon, lately Headmistress, Parkhurst Senior Girls' School, Tottenham.
- Alice Maud Walker, Lady District Superintendent, No.1 District, St. John Ambulance Brigade.
- Isabella Watson Walker, Senior Club Leader of St. Katherines Girls' Clubs, Aberdeen.
- Emma Wallace, Higher Clerical Officer, Foreign Office.
- Philip John Walters, Air Raid Precautions Sub-Controller, Eastern Division, Denbighshire, and Town Clerk of Wrexham.
- Caroline Mabel Warren, County Director and Assistant County Controller, VAD, City of Glasgow Scottish Branch, British Red Cross Society. For services to the Civil Nursing Reserve.
- William Weston, lately Chief Clerk, Territorial Army and Air Force Associations of the County and of the City of London.
- Robert Alexander Wetherall, FSAA, Honorary Secretary, Swansea Savings Committee.
- Edwin Philip Whettingstall, Waterguard Superintendent, Second Class, Board of Customs & Excise.
- Percy Gilbert Whitehouse, MC, Chairman of the Air Raid Precautions Committee, Birmingham Federation of Building Trades Employers.
- Captain Charles Willmott, Master, Merchant Navy.
- George Henry Willson, Assistant Constructor, Admiralty.
- Thomas Willson, Staff Officer, Ministry of Economic Warfare.
- Claude Fell Woods, Chief Air Raid Warden of the County Borough of Ipswich.
- Mathias Brewer, British Vice-Consul at La Guaira, Venezuela.
- Thomas Henry James Browne, a British subject resident in Santiago.
- John Benjamin Creasy, a British subject resident in Los Angeles.
- Margaret Dunn, a British subject resident in Istanbul.
- Michael Nicholas Elliadi, British Vice Consul at Candia, Crete.
- Walter Simpson Forbes, Personal Secretary to His Majesty's Ambassador in Cairo.
- Charles Gordon Frazer James, Clerical Officer at His Majesty's Embassy in Moscow.
- Margaret Reid. For her gallantry and devotion to duty during the evacuation from Norway; now employed in a Department under the Foreign Office.
- Edmund Reginald Templer, formerly British Vice-Consul at Ostend, now attached to the Aliens Department of the Home Office.
- Ada Beardmore Beveridge. For national and philanthropic services in the Commonwealth of Australia.
- The Reverend Ernest Boyce, Head of the South African General Mission, Mbabane, Swaziland.
- Lieutenant-Colonel Humphrey Browning, MC. For public services in the Commonwealth of Australia.
- Charles Budge. For municipal services in the District of Gladstone, State of South Australia.
- Ann Burdett, JP. For philanthropic and charitable services in the Commonwealth of Australia.
- Victor George Carrington, District Officer, Central Australia, Northern Territory, Commonwealth of Australia.
- Thomas Stanilaus Devine, Superintendent of Lighthouses, Newfoundland.
- Minnie May Gates, JP. For national and patriotic services in the Commonwealth of Australia.
- Alexander Bruce Harvey, Senior Clerk, Naval Staff Office, Sydney, Commonwealth of Australia.
- Elma Evelyn Hill. For social welfare services in the State of South Australia.
- Elizabeth Hunter, Matron of the War Memorial Hospital, Waverley, State of New South Wales. For public services in the Commonwealth of Australia.
- Peter Ernest Keam, Member of the Council for Scientific and Industrial Research, Commonwealth of Australia.
- Monica Lamb, Organising Secretary of the Empire Rendezvous at Liverpool under the auspices of the Empire Societies' War Hospitality Committee.
- Joseph Leask, Ship Constructor, Navy Office, Melbourne, Commonwealth of Australia.
- Jeannie Ann Mackintosh, Lady Clerk-in Charge, Office of the High Commissioner for Basutoland, the Bechuanaland Protectorate and Swaziland.
- Amelia Eveline Robertson. For national and philanthropic services in the Commonwealth of Australia.
- Alfred Victor Stretton, Superintendent of Police, Darwin, Northern Territory, Commonwealth of Australia.
- Charles Henry Turtle. For philanthropic services in the Commonwealth of Australia.
- Jessie Playfair Walker. For national and philanthropic services in the Commonwealth of Australia.
- Christian Don Warren, Organiser of the Overseas Forces Club, Glasgow, a Hostel for Overseas Troops under the auspices of the Empire Societies' War Hospitality Committee (West of Scotland Branch).
- Lena White. For services to the Red Cross and soldiers' philanthropic movements in the Commonwealth of Australia.
- Phoebe Elizabeth Wilmot, JP. For philanthropic services in connection with Returned Soldiers' movements in the Commonwealth of Australia.
- Elizabeth Isabel Hamilton-Browne, MB CHM(Sydney) DTM(Cal.), Women's Medical Service, Lady Assistant to the Inspector-General of Civil Hospitals, Punjab.
- Rani Phul Kumari, of Sherkot Estate, Dhampur, Bijnor District, United Provinces.
- Abdul Rahman Khan Chib, Bahadur, OBI, Colonel in the Alwar State Forces, Army Minister, Alwar State.
- Lala Kundan Lai Aggarwal, Indian Forest Service, Deputy Conservator of Forests, Punjab.
- Vernon Thomas Bayley, Indian Police, Assistant Director, Intelligence Bureau, Home Department, Government of India.
- Arthur Costello Beatson, Temporary Officer Supervisor, Quartermaster-General's Branch, General Headquarters, India.
- Baba Jaswant Singh Bedi, Landlord, Montgomery, Punjab.
- Khan Bahadur Ismailsaheb Madarsaheb Bedrekar, Honorary First Class Magistrate, Bijapur, Bombay.
- Hugh Kenneth Bennett, Officiating Temporary Deputy Mint Master and lately Head Engineer of His Majesty's Mint, Calcutta.
- Bisheshwarnath Makhanlal Bhargava, JP, Secretary, Union Bank of India Ltd., Bombay.
- Honorary Captain Risaldar-Major Sardar Bahadur Sardar Sant Singh Chimni, Bahadur, OBI, Honorary Magistrate, Gujranwala, Punjab.
- Major George Weston Clements, MC, Superintendent, Central Jail, Cannanore, Madras.
- Rai Bahadur Lala Debi Prasad, Rais, Muzaffarnagar, United Provinces.
- Marshall D'Mello, Proprietor, Caslon Printing Works, Fort, Bombay.
- Ernest Patrick Drake, Officer Supervisor and Personal Assistant to the Adjutant General in India.
- Horace Archibald Nelson Durham, Principal Appraiser, Custom House, Calcutta.
- Jacob Fernandes, Consulting Architect to the Government of Madras.
- Henry John Gasson, Deputy Commissioner of Excise, Madras.
- Terrence Patrick Gateley, Electrical Engineer, Central Public Works Department.
- Robert Charles George, Deputy Superintendent of Police (Ret'd), Motor Vehicles Inspector, Amravati, Central Provinces and Berar.
- Ivan Stanley Gonsalves, Assistant Secretary to the Government of India in the External Affairs Department.
- Francis James Gossip, Livestock Expert to the Government of Bengal.
- Sydney Botevyle Hickin, Executive Engineer, Barrage Division, Sind.
- Carl Ronald Hope-Johnstone, Assistant Secretary to the Government of Bombay in the Home Department (Political), Bombay.
- Captain John Baron Howes, Indian Political Service, Publicity Officer, Persian Gulf.
- Paul Thangaswami Jesu Doss, MB CHB DTM&H, DPH, Medical Officer of Health, Secunderabad Cantonment, Hyderabad, Deccan.
- Charles St. Denys Jordan, Sales Manager, North-Western Railway, Lahore.
- Gian Chand Kapur, Field Accounts Officer, Indian Contingent in Europe.
- Captain Edward Dunbar Lakin, Staff Captain, Master-General of the Ordnance Branch, General Headquarters, India.
- William John Laxton, Superintendent, Central Prison, Belgaum, Bombay.
- Sardar Jagjit Singh Man, Member of the Legislative Assembly, Honorary Magistrate, Sheikhupura, Punjab.
- Cecil Herbert Marrow, Assistant Superintendent, Telegraphs, East Indian Railway, Calcutta.
- Diwan Wazir Chand Mehra, Indian Police, District Officer, Frontier Constabulary, Hangu, North-West Frontier Province.
- Dorab Byramjee Moddie, Chief Representative, Messrs. K. Sorabjee & Son, Labour Contractor, Eastern Bengal Railway, Santahar, Bengal.
- Mohammad Shoaib, Controller, Army Factory Accounts.
- Lieutenant Sayyad Mubarik Ali Shah, Member of the Legislative Assembly, Assistant Recruiting Officer, Gujrat, Punjab.
- Khan Bahadur Khan Murtaza Khan, Extra Assistant Commissioner, Baluchistan.
- Nasim Husain, Private Secretary to the High Commissioner for India, London.
- John William Nicholson, lately Assistant Secretary, Ministry of Supply Mission to India.
- Khan Bahadur Nuruzzaman, Zamindar, Bhola, Bakarganj, Bengal.
- Bulchand Shivdasani Parsram, Medical Officer, R. B. Udhavdas Tarachand Hospital, Shikarpur, Sind.
- Cecil Robert Porrett, Adviser to Government on Manual Training, Madras.
- Rai Sahib Nanak Chand Puri, Survey Officer, Central Provinces and Berar.
- Henry Victor Quigley, Works Manager, Modernization Planning, Ordnance Factories, Government of India in the Department of Supply.
- Robert Rennie Roberts, Officer Supervisor, General Staff Branch, General Headquarters, India.
- Khan Bahadur Saghirul Haq, Mukhtear and Honorary Secretary, Siwan Central Cooperative Bank, Bihar.
- Shahamatullah Khan Bahadur, OBI, Lieutenant-Colonel in the Gwalior State Forces (Ret'd), Extra Assistant Recruiting Officer, Bareilly, United Provinces.
- Sham Bahadur, Barrister-at-Law, Patna, Bihar.
- Rai Bahadur Pandit Shambhu Nath, Deputy Superintendent of Police, Criminal Investigation Department, United Provinces.
- Khan Bahadur Muhammad Shamsuddahar, Deputy Commissioner of Police, Special Branch, Calcutta, Bengal.
- Frederick Sims, Electrical Inspector & Electrical Engineer, Bihar.
- Cecil Peach Singer, Superintendent, Department of Education, Health & Lands, Government of India.
- Sohan Lal, Principal, Orissa School of Engineering, Orissa.
- Athamanakottai Subrahmanyam, Deputy Military Accountant-General.
- Mir Waliullah, Public Prosecutor and Government Pleader, Hazara, North-West Frontier Province.
- Captain Arthur Cecil Woods, Staff Captain, Military Secretary's Branch, General Headquarters, India.
- William George Alder, lately Superintendent, Government Printing & Stationery, Burma.
- Aun Kim Hmein, Director of Messrs. Coombes & Co. Ltd., Honorary Magistrate, Rangoon.
- Rayal Brazley Bodden. For public services in Jamaica.
- Newton James Haworth Clayton, Sanitary Surveyor, Jerusalem Municipality, Palestine.
- Percival Stanley Coleman. For public services in Cyprus.
- Patrick Crawley, Foreman Locksmith, Harbour Board, Singapore, Straits Settlements.
- Eustace Henry Taylor Cummings, MD DPH, Medical Officer, Sierra Leone.
- Nana Tsibu Darku IX, Omanhene of Asin Atandasu, Gold Coast.
- William John Davies, Colonial Education Service, Principal, Prince of Wales School, Sierra Leone.
- Laurence Cranmore Giles, Colonial Administrative Service, Assistant District Officer, Nigeria.
- Percy Wyn Harris, Colonial Administrative Service, District Officer, Kenya.
- John Thomas Kennedy, Senior Assistant Livestock Officer, Uganda Protectorate.
- Alexander Barclay Loggie, Inspector of Works, Public Works Department, Northern Rhodesia.
- Seth Mathuradas Kalidas Mehta. For social and philanthropic services in the Tanganyika Territory.
- Ronald Wilfred Parr, Colonial Administrative Service, District Officer, Northern Rhodesia.
- Arthur Edward Perera, Registrar of Motor Vehicles, Perak, Federated Malay States.
- Duraiappa Rajaratnam. For social services in Ceylon.
- Henry John Ranee, Health Inspector, Tanganyika Territory.
- Georgiana Ellenberger Robinson. For services to education in Antigua, Leeward Islands.
- Adela Stephen. For public services in Kenya.
- Kenneth Walker Switzer, Colonial Administrative Service, District Officer, Nyasaland Protectorate.
- Reginald Clive Sykes, Chief Storekeeper, Public Works Department, Nigeria.
- Madame Tan Chay Yan. For social and charitable services in the Straits Settlements.
- George Harold Thomas, MD, Chinese Medical Officer, Hong Kong.
- Leonard Nigel Tucker. For public services in Bermuda.
- The Reverend Harold Wilkie Weigall. For social welfare services in the Zanzibar Protectorate.
- Albert James Wilson. For social and charitable services in Mauritius.

Honorary Members

- Moshe Bramson, Chief Officer, Haifa Voluntary Fire Brigade, Palestine.
- Hanna Bulos, District Officer, Palestine.
- As'ad Salem, Assistant Settlement Officer, Palestine.

=== Order of the Companions of Honour (CH) ===
- The Right Honourable Albert Victor Alexander, MP, First Lord of the Admiralty.

=== Companion of the Imperial Service Order (ISO) ===
Home Civil Service

- Francis William Boustred, Deputy Controller of Stamps, Board of Inland Revenue.
- Sidney Pyne Brewer, Head of Technical Schools Section, Board of Education.
- John Buist Blythe Brown, General Inspector, Department of Health for Scotland.
- Kenneth Paul Burgess, OBE, Principal Consultative Officer for Sea Transport, Ministry of War Transport.
- Harry Chambers, MBE, Principal, Ministry of Agriculture & Fisheries.
- Ernest Heapy Cross, Principal, Air Ministry.
- James Frederick French, MBE, Senior Assistant to the Librarian, Foreign Office.
- John Getty, Chief Inspector, Ministry of Agriculture, Northern Ireland.
- Percy Cyril Gunner, Accountant, Charity Commission.
- Charles William Hall, Senior Principal Clerk, Ministry of Pensions.
- Robert Arthur Hamblin, Staff Officer, Dominions Office.
- Joseph Patrick Lalor, Principal Clerk, Central Office of the Supreme Court of Judicature.
- Thomas Limond, Chief Accountant, War Office.
- David Lindsay, MC, Inspector, First Class, Board of Customs & Excise.
- Albert William Mason, lately Senior Staff Officer, Ministry of Health.
- Idris James Morris, Assistant Director of Ordnance Factories, Ministry of Supply.
- William John Pryce, Principal Patents & Awards Officer, Ministry of Aircraft Production.
- Herbert Cecil Salmon, Staff Officer, Tithe Redemption Commission.
- Charles Reginald Stampe, Controller, Money Order Department, General Post Office.
- Frederick Henry Taylor, OBE, lately Chief Staff Officer, Board of Trade.
- William Frederick Thomas, Assistant Secretary and Chief Clerk, Public Works Loan Board, temporarily employed on the staff of the Capital Issues Committee.
- William Ernest Wall, Chief Inspector of Audit, National Insurance Audit Department.
- Horace Aurelian White, Deputy Controller, HM Stationery Office.
- Harry Walter Wiswould, Principal, Department of Overseas Trade.

Dominions Civil Services

- Joseph Adams, Deputy Commissioner in Victoria of the Taxation Branch, Treasury, Commonwealth of Australia.
- Lawrence Bede Fanning, Chief Inspector (Telephones), Central Staff, Postmaster-General's Department, Commonwealth of Australia.
- John Lindsay Oliver, lately a Native Commissioner, Southern Rhodesia.
- Robert George Peake, General Manager, Harbours Board, State of South Australia.
- Major Elliot Frank Playford, OBE, Registrar-General of Deeds, State of South Australia.
- Francis John Wane. For services as a Native Commissioner in Southern Rhodesia. (Now Temporary Lieutenant-Colonel, Rhodesian African Rifles.)
- Sidney Bruce Williams, District Commissioner, Southern District, Swaziland.
- Lieutenant-Colonel David Panton Young, VD, Accountant, Treasury, State of Tasmania.

Indian Civil Services

- Madho Sudan Chakrabarty, Financial Assistant to the Resident for Rajputana and Chief Commissioner, Ajmer-Merwara.
- Joseph Anthony Croning, MBE, lately Officiating Under-Secretary to the Political Resident in the Persian Gulf.
- Adolph Louis Haas, Mechanical Engineer, India Store Department, London.
- William Victor Rogers, Superintendent, Civil Secretariat, North-West Frontier Province.

Burma Civil Service

- Wilfred Clement Fuller, Officiating Assistant Secretary to the Government of Burma, Home & Judicial Departments.

Colonial Service

- Horatio Emmanuel Bacarisas, MBE, Assistant Treasurer, Gibraltar.
- Morgan Dokuboh Bob-Manuel, Collector of Customs, Nigeria.
- Anthony Nicholas Branco, Local Assistant Auditor, Cyprus.
- Amos Silvanus Dadzie, Senior Collector of Customs, Gold Coast.
- Samuel Lauchlan D'Athill, formerly Magistrate, Antigua, Leeward Islands.
- Julius Levi John, Assistant Colonial Secretary, Sierra Leone.
- Murugasoo Visvanather Kandiah, Accountant, Federal Treasury, Federated Malay States.
- William Theodore Loos, Office Assistant to the Chief Secretary, Ceylon.
- Thomas Rainey Mullen, formerly Chief Clerk, Medical Department, Nigeria.
- Mudaliyar Sinattampi Vallipuram, Assistant Settlement Officer, Ceylon.

=== Kaisar-i-Hind Medal ===
In Gold

- Olive Bertha, Lady Graham (wife of Sir Lancelot Graham, KCSI KCIE, lately Governor of Sind).
- Lydia Torrance Allen, MD FRCOG, Superintendent, Lady Dufferin Hospital, Calcutta, Bengal.
- Eva Mary Bell, OBE.
- Margaret Duncan Salmond, Lady Willingdon Leper Settlement, Tirumani, Chingleput, Madras.
- The Reverend John Garrett, Principal, Murray College, Sialkot, Punjab.
- Squadron-Leader Henry Robert William Hogg, CIE OBE, Provincial Secretary, Punjab Boy Scouts Association, Lahore, Punjab.
- Roderick Henry Turing Mackenzie, Chief Engineer, Public Works Department, Buildings & Roads, Bikaner State, Rajputana.
- The Reverend Ira Wilbur Moomaw, Principal, Vocational Training School, Ankleshwar, Broach and Panch Mahals District, Bombay.

=== British Empire Medal (BEM) ===
Civil Division

- P. G. Abraham, Marker-out, Vickers-Armstrongs Ltd.
- Dudley Alfred Alderton, Overseer in Charge, Air Ministry Outstation.
- Habibullah X. Allimuddin, Oilman, Merchant Navy.
- Ernest Maurice Bailey, Chauffeur, Foreign Office.
- C. Banks, Steward, Merchant Navy.
- John McLeans Beaton, Carpenter, Merchant Navy.
- Wilfred Edward Beck, Head Observer, Royal Observer Corps.
- Douglas Bell, Inspector, Headquarters Engineering Branch, General Post Office.
- William Birrell, Police Inspector, Haddington, Air Raid Precautions Training Officer for East Lothian County.
- R. F. Birt, Foreman, Gloster Aircraft Ltd.
- Dorothea Nowell Mary Bowen, First Aid Commandant, Filton.
- Matthew Bradley, Setter, Royal Ordnance Factory.
- Thomas Brannen, Carpenter, Merchant Navy.
- Arthur E. Britton, Superintendent of Rescue and Decontamination Services, Filton, Gloucestershire.
- Margaret Campbell, Sorting Clerk and Telegraphist, Kyle, Ross-shire.
- Rosemary Jean Campbell, Auxiliary Ambulance Station Officer, Rotherhithe.
- Arthur William Coleman, Head Foreman, J. Samuel White & Co. Ltd.
- Florence Maud Collard, Tonbridge. For services during the evacuation from Dunkirk.
- John Collett, Head Observer, Royal Observer Corps.
- George Edward Cooper, Carpenter, Merchant Navy.
- Finlay Cully, Foreman Moulder, Fairbairn Lawson Combe Barbour Ltd.
- Alice Mary Day, Acting Supervisor, Head Post Office, Coventry.
- Thomas Charles Dennis, Foreman Shipwright, Vickers-Armstrongs Ltd.
- Archibald Dickson, Able Seaman, Merchant Navy.
- Frederick Alfred Dickson, Gunlayer, Merchant Navy.
- Gertrude Barbara Dixon, Ambulance Driver, Civil Defence Service, Birmingham.
- S. Drake, Boatswain, Merchant Navy.
- David Drummond, Senior Pattern Maker, Alexander Stephen & Sons Ltd.
- William Dustow, Inspector, Plymouth City Police Force. Staff Officer, Air Raid Precautions Wardens' Service, Plymouth.
- Leslie Lawrence Dutson, Skilled Workman, Class I, Portsmouth Telephone Area.
- Magnus Edwardson, Boatswain, Northern Lighthouse Service.
- Walter England, Length Ganger, Bordesley, Great Western Railway.
- C David Emlyn Evans, Inspector, Glamorgan Constabulary. For services to Civil Defence.
- Joseph Fielding, Foreman, Hick, Hargreaves & Co. Ltd.
- Leonard Fisher, Senior Artificer, HM Signal School, Portsmouth.
- Leslie Frederick Fletcher, Apprentice, Merchant Navy.
- George Henry Percy Fowler, Process Worker, Royal Ordnance Factory.
- Charles Garnham, Able Seaman, Merchant Navy.
- William Gibson, Chief Inspector, Gateshead Borough Police. For services to Civil Defence.
- Alfred Henry Gilder, Stocktaker, Royal Arsenal, Woolwich.
- Thomas Godden, District Inspector, Southampton Waterworks Department. For services to Civil Defence.
- William Goldie, Fitter, William Denny & Brothers.
- Robert Story Gowland, Turner, Hawthorn Leslie & Co. Ltd.
- James Grade, Chargehand, Imperial Chemical Industries (Explosives) Ltd.
- John Hague, Able Seaman, Merchant Navy.
- Charles Harris, Quartermaster, Merchant Navy.
- Francis Edward Harris, Signalman, Saltley, London, Midland & Scottish Railway.
- Sydney Harrison, Engineer, Wolseley Motors Ltd.
- Charles Edgar Hislop, Skilled Workman, Class I (Acting Inspector), Post Office, Southampton.
- Frederick James Hodge, Assistant Depot Staff Officer, Northfield Baths Depot, Birmingham. For services to Civil Defence.
- Herbert Hewitt Holmes, Chief Officer (Class I), Portland Borstal Institution.
- Arthur Howard Holt, Ambulance Driver, County Borough of Brighton.
- John William Hopper, Civilian Instructor, Grade I, Air Ministry.
- John Jack, Foreman, Imperial Chemical Industries (Metals) Ltd.
- Edith Ellen Jackaman, Assistant Supervisor, Class I, Telephone Exchange, Ipswich.
- Leslie Thomas Jennings, Inspector, Post Office, Southampton.
- A. Johnson, Boatswain, Merchant Navy.
- Arthur Jones, Foreman, Molines Machine Co. Ltd.
- Cecil Kirby, Permanent Way Inspector, Sheffield, London & North Eastern Railway.
- Samuel Kniveton, Air Raid Precautions Officer, Leeds.
- Robert Lennox, Senior Examiner, Aeronautical Inspection Directorate, Ministry of Aircraft Production.
- Margaret John Lewis, Headcorn, Kent. For services during the evacuation from Dunkirk.
- Frederick Lincoln, Permanent Way Inspector, Stratford, London & North Eastern Railway.
- Harold Lindsay, Inspector, Doncaster Borough Police. For services to Civil Defence.
- Arthur James Linge, Second Steward, Merchant Navy.
- Rosa Lord, Senior First Aid Officer, Leicester.
- Abdool Lotiff, Deck Tindal, Merchant Navy.
- Alexander Herbert Lupton, Assistant, Grade II, Air Ministry.
- Lilian Teresa Manley, Chief Officer, HM Prison Holloway.
- William Martin, Able Seaman, Merchant Navy.
- George Henry Matthews, First Aid Instructor, Newark, Notts.
- Thomas Lindsay Meldrum, Observer, Royal Observer Corps.
- J. Moar, Boatswain, Merchant Navy.
- John Montgomery, Foreman Joiner, Imperial Chemical Industries (Explosives) Ltd.
- H. E. Moore, Greaser, Merchant Navy.
- Joseph Moran, Overseer (Postal), Post Office, Manchester.
- Thomas Atwell Mursell, Carpenter, Merchant Navy.
- George Parfitt, Inspector, Oldham Police Force, Air Raid Precautions Staff Officer for Oldham.
- Isaac Parkin, Boatswain, Merchant Navy.
- Clara Emily Parry, Petrol Gauger, Imperial Chemical Industries (Metals) Ltd.
- Septimus Pearey, Marker Off, Wallsend Slipway & Engineering Co. Ltd.
- Lalla Rukman X. Rukman Ram, Quartermaster, Merchant Navy.
- Edgar Rawlings, Office Keeper, Land Registry.
- James Reid, Able Seaman, Merchant Navy.
- William Robertson, Lieutenant, Aberdeen Police. Air Raid Precautions Officer for Aberdeen.
- G. H. Robinson, Electrical Engineer, Bristol Aeroplane Co. Ltd.
- William Maurice Robinson, Office Keeper, Colonial Office and Dominions Office.
- John Watson Roger, Lieutenant, Edinburgh City Police. Air Raid Precautions Training Officer, Edinburgh.
- David William Rushent, Storeman, Royal Gunpowder Factory.
- Edmund Scott, Grinder, Royal Ordnance Factory.
- Gladys Ann Shee, Chief Woman Assistant, Public Assistance Department, Kesteven County Council. For services to Civil Defence.
- Lawson Short, Gunlayer, Merchant Navy.
- Harry James Shuck, Gunlayer, Merchant Navy.
- Hugh E. Skillen, Greaser, Merchant Navy.
- James Alexander Skinner, Inspector, Grimsby Borough Police. For services to Civil Defence.
- Vera Marjorie Cowper-Smith, Auxiliary Ambulance Station Officer, Borough, London.
- Frank Smith, Head Forester, Forestry Commission.
- Eliza Ann Stebbings, Head Lady Warden, Kenyon Street Air Raid Precautions Sub Division, Birmingham.
- Christopher Stennett, Postman, Paddington District Office.
- George C. Stevens, Transport Officer, Clevedon Area. For services to Civil Defence.
- Cecil Summers, Principal Foreman of Stores, Air Ministry.
- C. F. Tabor, Gunlayer, Merchant Navy.
- James Todd, Gunlayer, Merchant Navy.
- William Robert Tofts, Turner, G & J Weir Ltd.
- Frederick Tooze, Head Air Raid Warden, Scunthorpe.
- Leslie Norman Tope, Staff Officer to the Medical Officer of Health, Plymouth. For services to Civil Defence.
- Torabolli, Engine Serang, Merchant Navy.
- Elizabeth Tough, Member, Women's Voluntary Services Regional Staff, Berkshire.
- Mary Smith Trotter, Chargehand Processwoman, Imperial Chemical Industries (Explosives) Ltd.
- John Tulloch, Boatswain, Northern Lighthouse Service.
- David Tulloch, Boatswain, Merchant Navy.
- Elisha Unsworth, Quartermaster, Merchant Navy.
- Daniel Wade, Donkeyman, Merchant Navy.
- Colenso Pretoria Charles Wallis, Merchant Navy.
- Harold Charles Ward, Head Postman, Head Post Office, Birmingham.
- Herbert Henry Ward, Permanent Way Ganger, Plaistow, London, Midland & Scottish Railway.
- Shirley George Archibald Brooks Ward, Canteen Manager, Standard Telephones & Cables Ltd.
- Richard H. Le Warne, Foreman, Air Raid Precautions Rescue Parties, Falmouth.
- James Watson, Observer, Royal Observer Corps.
- Daniel Ernest Waugh, Donkeyman, Merchant Navy.
- Joseph Webster, Steward, Merchant Navy.
- Wallace James Adams Westcott, Observer, Royal Observer Corps.
- William Whiteside, Head Foreman, Vickers-Armstrongs, Ltd.
- A. J. Wilkinson, Quartermaster, Merchant Navy.
- Charles Puller Will, Head Observer, Royal Observer Corps.
- John Barton Williams, Air Raid Precautions Group Warden, Birmingham.
- William John Williams, Assistant Inspector, Head Post Office, Swansea.
- Stanley Thomas Willis, Inspector, Post Office Engineering Research Station.
- Philip Frederick Hood Wilson, Head Observer, Royal Observer Corps.
- William Johnston Wilson, Overseer (Postal), Head Post Office, Newcastle upon Tyne.
- Charles Henry Wise, Chargeman, Rosyth Boom Defence Depot.
- George William Woodford, Boatswain, Merchant Navy.
- Francis E. Woodman, Depot Superintendent, Air Raid Precautions Action Depot, Bristol.

Dominions

- Herbert William Turner, Depot Foreman (Grade I), Ordnance Branch, Northern Command, Department of Defence, Commonwealth of Australia.

India

- Thomas William Dinsdale, Foreman, Inspectorate of Guns & Unfilled Ammunition, Gossipore.
- Anantrao Gopalrao, Petty Officer, Bombay Excise Constabulary Force, Ahmedabad, Bombay.
- Achath Madavan Nair, Head Assistant, Office of the Commander, Royal Indian Army Service Corps, Deccan District.
- Rao Sahib Karunguli Murugesa Mudaliar Selva Rajan, Selection Grade Clerk, Indian Army Corps of Clerks, Headquarters, Deccan District.
- Lala Ram Rakha, Head Clerk, Office of the Commander, Royal Engineers, Waziristan District, North-West Frontier Province.
- John Borthwick Rankine, Foreman, Inspectorate of Small Arms, Ishapore.
- Pu Lalluaia Sailo, Chief of Reiek in the Lushai Hills, Assam.
- Frederick William Stone, Foreman Examiner, Inspectorate of Small Arms, Ishapore.

Colonial Empire

- Subhi Hashwa, Clerk, Department of Land Settlement, Palestine.
- Mohammad Ibrehim Kawas, Surveyor, Department of Surveys, Palestine.
- Theodore Segal, Clerk, Department of Public Works, Palestine.
- Shukri Eff. Esh Sherif, Madir El Mal, Hebron, Palestine.
- Joseph Storace, Superintendent, Air Raid Precautions Department, Malta.
- Frederick Stanley Talbot, Clerk, Public Works Department, Palestine.
- Tutu Tekanene, Native Medical Practitioner (1st Class), Gilbert and Ellice Islands.

=== Imperial Service Medal ===
Indian Civil Services

- Gunaji Ganpat Chawan, Jemadar (Ret'd), General Post Office, Bombay.
- Gurditta, Jemadar Chaprassi (Ret'd), Punjab Civil Secretariat, Lahore, Punjab.
- Simon Joseph, First Grade Warder (Ret'd), Madras.
- Kalathiakandy Kannan, Warder (Ret'd), Madras.
- Nur Muhammad, Head Daftri (Ret'd), Government House, United Provinces.
- Sikandar Ali, Jemadar to His Excellency the Viceroy (Ret'd).

=== King's Police and Fire Services Medal ===
==== For Gallantry ====
England and Wales

- James Thomas Barton, Constable, Metropolitan Police Force.
- Thomas Joseph Pritlove, Constable, Metropolitan Police Force.
- Albert Stapleton, Constable, Buckinghamshire Constabulary.
- Alfred James Everitt, Constable, Surrey Constabulary.
- Thomas Arthur Benn, deceased, Constable, Liverpool City Police Force.
- Leslie Walter Lacey, Constable, Liverpool City Police Force.

Scotland

- James Mackie, Constable, Glasgow City Police Force.
- Duncan Macintyre, Constable, Glasgow City Police Force.

New Zealand

- Donald Austin, Sergeant, New Zealand Police Force.

==== For Distinguished Service ====
England and Wales

- Frederick Thomas Tarry, OBE, Chief Constable of Exeter City Police Force, acting Chief Constable of Southampton.
- Thomas Edward Howden, Chief Constable of Hull City Police Force.
- Arthur Killick Mayall, OBE, Chief Constable of Oldham Borough Police Force.
- William Collins, Superintendent, Metropolitan Police Force.
- Reginald Ernest Franklin, Superintendent, Metropolitan Police Force.
- Richard Morrill, Superintendent, Metropolitan Police Force.
- Orlando Knights, Superintendent, Essex Constabulary.
- James Cunningham, Superintendent, Northumberland Constabulary.
- Ralph Wastie, Superintendent and Deputy Chief Constable, Oxfordshire.
- John Henry Ogilvie Jilbert, Superintendent, Leeds City Police Force. Regional Police Staff Officer, No.2 Region.
- John Thomas Butler, Superintendent, Liverpool City Police Force.
- Sidney Henry Charters, Chief Superintendent, London Fire Brigade.
- Augustus Ra May, Chief Superintendent, London Fire Brigade, Officer-in-Charge of Fire Control Room, Home Office.
- Harold James Norman, Chief Superintendent, London Fire Brigade.
- Arthur Henry Woods, OBE, Chief Officer, Folkestone Fire Brigade.
- George Thomas Hill, Chief Officer, Letchworth Fire Brigade.
- William Ernest Greenhalgh, Chief Officer, Tottenham Fire Brigade.
- Henry William Coleman, Third Officer, Birmingham Fire Brigade.

Scotland

- William Cormack, Chief Constable, Caithness County Constabulary.
- William Whyte, Chief Constable, Stirling County Constabulary.
- Robert Stronach, Chief Constable, Dunfermline Burgh Police Force.

Australia

- Henry Chinner, lately Superintendent, Second Class, New South Wales Police Force.
- William John Keefe, Inspector, First Class, New South Wales Police Force.
- Joseph James Lynch, lately Superintendent, Third Class, New South Wales Police Force.
- Jacob Henry Miller, lately Superintendent, Second Class, New South Wales Police Force.
- Matthew Thomas Pearce Saunders, lately Superintendent, Third Class, New South Wales Police Force.
- John William White, lately Superintendent, First Class, New South Wales Police Force.
- James Kemp, MIFireE, Chief Officer, Metropolitan Fire Brigade, Melbourne, Victoria.

India

- Sidney Clarence Aubrey Lyon, Superintendent of Police, Bombay.
- Khan Bahadur Ismail Kalubhai Desai, ISO, Officiating District Superintendent of Police, Bombay.
- James Henry Hammond, Deputy Superintendent of Police, Bombay.
- Khan Bahadur Haji Nawab Ali Khan, Deputy Superintendent of Police, North-West Frontier Province.
- Khan Sahib Abdul Qadir Khan, Deputy Superintendent of Police, North-West Frontier Province.
- S. V. Dharkar, Deputy Inspector General of Police, Gwalior State.
- Hyem Reuben, Officiating Deputy Superintendent of Police, Western India States Agency.

Colonies, Protectorates and Mandated Territories

- Albert John Kingsley-Heath, OBE MC, Deputy Inspector General, Palestine Police Force.
- Major Ahmed Bey Ramzi, Qaid, Arab Legion, Trans-Jordan.

=== Colonial Police Medal ===
- David Adenowo Awode, Superintendent, Nigeria.
- Noured Din Bseisso, Inspector, Palestine.
- Alastair Campbell, Inspector, Palestine.
- Frederick Hugh Colenutt, Inspector, Palestine.
- George Anthony Valleton De Boissiere, Senior Assistant Superintendent, Nigeria.
- Captain Percy Eckel, Superintendent, Gold Coast.
- Walter Robert Elliott, Chief Inspector, Kenya.
- Abdi Farah, Sergeant, Kenya.
- Leslie Augustus Fisher, Inspector, Palestine.
- Malcolm Lionel Fraser, Superintendent, Gold Coast.
- Llewellyn Griffiths, Assistant Superintendent, Kenya.
- Patrick John Hackett, Deputy Superintendent, Palestine.
- Aden Bulaleh Hason, Inspector, Aden.
- Hassanbin Mohamed, Sergeant, Kenya.
- Allan Vere Douglas Ince, Senior Assistant Superintendent, Nigeria.
- John Emmanuel Kankam, Sergeant, Gold Coast.
- Thomas Robert Joseph Ridgway, Superintendent, Kenya.
- Yehoshua Shammay, Inspector, Palestine.
- Abdullah Selim Abu Sheikha, Inspector, Palestine.
- Ronald Stuart Shuel, inspector, Nigeria.
- George Henry Simmons, Inspector, Palestine.
- Hargopal Rai Varma, Sub-Inspector, Kenya.
- Thomas James Wilkins, Inspector, Palestine.
