= Nawab Jamia Mosque =

Mosque in Tamil Nadu, India

Religion
- Affiliation: Islam
- Ecclesiastical or organizational status: Mosque
- Status: Active

Location
- Location: Chengalpattu, Kanchipuram district, Tamil Nadu
- Country: India

The Nawab Jamia Mosque is a mosque in the town of Chengalpattu, in the Kanchipuram district of the state of Tamil Nadu, India. It is the most important mosque in the town.

== See also ==
- Islam in India
- List of mosques in India
