= Nanavati =

Nanavati is a Gujarati surname. It could refer to:

- Akshay Nanavati
- G. T. Nanavati
- Manilal Balabhai Nanavati

== Other uses ==
- K. M. Nanavati v. State of Maharashtra
