= William Douglas (civil servant) =

Scottish civil servant (1890–1953)

Sir William Scott Douglas, GCB, KBE (20 August 1890 – 17 February 1953) was a Scottish civil servant.

Born on 20 August 1890 in Edinburgh, Douglas was educated at George Heriot's School and the University of Edinburgh. He entered the civil service in 1914 and worked in the Customs and Excise Department. In 1920, he was made the financial adviser to the East Prussian plebiscite commission. From 1920 to 1924, he was private secretary to Sir John Bradbury, and was then (from 1924 to 1926) assistant secretary to the British delegation to the Reparation Commission in Paris. After two further years at the Customs and Excise Department, he transferred to the Ministry of Labour in 1928 and was a divisional controller for Scotland.

From 1936 to 1939, he was secretary of the Scottish Department of Health. From 1939 to 1942, he was at HM Treasury, before transferring to the Ministry of Supply as permanent secretary; he remained in that office for the rest of the Second World War. Finally, he was permanent secretary at the Ministry of Health from 1945 to 1951. He was appointed a Companion of the Order of the Bath (CB) in the 1938 New Year Honours and promoted to Knight Commander (KCB) in the 1943 Birthday Honours and Knight Grand Cross (GCB) in the 1950 New Year Honours; he was also appointed a Knight Commander of the Order of the British Empire (KBE) in the 1941 Birthday Honours. He died on 17 February 1953.

Government offices
Preceded by John Elborn Highton	Secretary, Department of Health for Scotland; 1937–1939	Succeeded by Sir Robert Fraser
Preceded by Sir William Barrowclough Brown	Permanent Secretary, Ministry of Supply; 1942–1945	Succeeded by Sir Oliver Franks
Preceded by Sir John Maude	Permanent Secretary, Ministry of Health; 1945–1951	Succeeded by Sir John Hawton
