= John Hawton =

Sir John Malcolm Kenneth Hawton, KCB (18 September 1904 – 7 January 1983) was a British civil servant.

Born on 18 September 1904, Hawton was educated at Emanuel School and St John's College, Cambridge. He was called to the bar before entering the civil service in 1927 as an official in the Ministry of Health.

At the Ministry, Hawton was involved in preparing the 1944 white paper which proposed the creation of a National Health Service (NHS), though the question of how the various types of hospitals should be managed under the NHS was complicated and a separate plan was drawn up by the Minister, Henry Willink, as a compromise between the original intentions and the proposals of various hospital owners and other involved parties. After the 1945 general election ushered in a Labour government, Aneurin Bevan became Minister of Health; he gave Hawton responsibility for preparing for the establishment of the NHS. He and Bevan amended the 1944 plans to include nationalisation of all hospitals, which was eventually rolled out in 1948 -- a radical departure even from Labour's previous proposals for municipalisation. In his obituary, The Times wrote that Hawton was likely an advocate for nationalisation, having become frustrated with the tensions and conflicts between the various owners of municipal and voluntary hospitals in the interwar period. In 1947, he was appointed deputy secretary at the Ministry, in succession to Sir Arthur Rucker. He was made permanent secretary of the Ministry in 1951, serving until 1960. He was then chairman of the British Waterways Board from 1963 to 1968.

Hawton was appointed a Companion of the Order of the Bath (CB) in the 1947 New Year Honours and promoted to Knight Commander in the 1952 Birthday Honours. He died on 7 January 1982.

Government offices
Preceded by Sir William Douglas	Permanent Secretary, Ministry of Health; 1951–1960	Succeeded by Sir Bruce Fraser
