= Frank Gill (engineer) =

Manx engineer and a pioneer of Telephony (1866 - 1950)

Sir Frank Gill KCMG OBE (4 October 1866 – 25 October 1950) was a Manx engineer and a pioneer of Telephony, especially international telephony.

== Early life ==
Gill was born at Castletown, Isle of Man, the son of Henry C Gill and nephew of Hugh Gill. At the age of 11 he was sent to live with his uncle in the English coastal town of Southport Lancashire following the death of his father. He studied at Finsbury Technical College under Professor Ayrton and also at the Royal College of Science for Ireland and Liverpool University.

== Career ==
He joined the United Telephone Company at the age of sixteen, eventually managing the Ireland branch which had been taken over by the National Telephone Company.
In 1902 he moved to their London office to become Engineer-in Chief. Until 1912 the NTC provided the majority of the telephone service in Great Britain, but it was run on a franchise from the Post Office who also had the right to buy out NTC after a fixed period. After the Post Office exercised that right, Gill formed a partnership with W.W Cook and together they carried out international telephone work in several countries.

During World War I Gill was appointed to the Ministry of Munitions obtaining the rank of Controller of the Central Stores. In recognition of this work he was made an OBE.

After the war Gill dissolved his partnership with Cook.

In 1922 he became president of the Institution of Electrical Engineers and in his presidential address he proposed that Europe should have a long distance telephone system equivalent to that of AT&T in the USA, who ran a service between New York and San Francisco. As a result of his address, the French took the initiative to try to make this a reality. They convened a meeting of delegates from six of the western European states to form an international consultative committee (CCIF), to decide on the technical standards required as different countries used different telephone systems. Sir Norman Kipping spent five years under Gill as a transmission engineer developing the transcontinental telephone system, but ultimately, the European states were keen to preserve their national sovereignty so Gill's ideas weren't fruitful for many years.

From 1919 until 1928 he was the European chief engineer of International Western Electric, a division of the Western Electric Company. In this capacity, he had access to new research materials such as Permalloy which he introduced to Alan Blumlein who at that time, worked in the transmission laboratory. The company subsequently became International Standard Electric Corporation and then, later on, Standard Telephones and Cables (STC). In 1925 Western Electric's European operations were acquired by ITT Corporation and in 1928 Gill became vice president. He also held the position of Executive vice president of the Spanish Telephone Company, Compania Telefónica Nacional de Espana who had been part of ITT’s expansion. During this time he was responsible for reconstructing the Spanish telephone system and in recognition of his work, he was admitted to the Order of Isabella the Catholic.
The Emperor of Japan awarded him the Order of the Sacred Treasure third class, for services to the Japanese Government on 29 July 1930.

== Wireless ==
In 1922, the first official radio broadcast triggered a demand from many other stations to apply for broadcast licenses from the GPO. It was evident to the Postmaster General that chaos could occur if all the licences requested were issued and the best solution would be to have just one broadcasting company. In the interests of all parties concerned, it was decided that the initial meeting to discuss the issue would be held on neutral territory and thus the Institute of Electrical Engineers was chosen. As President of the IEE Gill chaired the preliminary committee to establish one broadcasting company and this led to the foundation of the BBC. Gill suggested the name "British Broadcasting Company" and held the chairmanship of the new organsisation from May 1922 to July 1922 when he was replaced by Sir William Noble.

== Later life ==
Gill was chairman of the Telephone Development Association in 1935 and 1941 and it is evident from the war diary of Sir Clifford Copland Paterson that Gill’s position in British Industry contributed towards the war effort during this period. In 1941 he was made a KCMG in recognition of his services to the telephone industry. In 1946 he was made an Honorary Member of the CCIF, who later became ITU-T. Gill made his last radio broadcast in February 1947 for the centenary celebration of the birth of Alexander Graham Bell.
For modernisation of the Shanghai Telephone Company, he was awarded the Order of Brilliant Star in 1949.

Gill was drawn into controversy in 2003 over who actually invented the telephone when archived documents unearthed by the Science Museum, London suggested that a device made by Johann Philipp Reis and tested by STC in 1947 would pre-date Alexander Graham Bell by 15 years. It was suggested that Gill, who was head of STC at that time, suppressed these findings as STC were negotiating a contract with AT&T and didn’t want to compromise the deal.

== Death ==
Frank Gill was involved in telecommunications right up until his death which occurred whilst attending meetings of the International Consultative Committee on Telecommunication (CCIF) in Geneva Switzerland.
