= Melamaiyur =

City in Chengalpattu

- Census town
- Location in Tamil Nadu, India
- Coordinates: 12°41′02″N 79°58′39″E
- Country: India
- State: Tamil Nadu
- District: Chengalpattu

Population (2001)
  - Total: 5,155

Languages
  - Official: Tamil
- Time zone: UTC+5:30 (IST)

Melamaiyur is a census town in Chengalpattu district in the Indian state of Tamil Nadu.

== Demographics ==
As of 2001 India census, Melamaiyur had a population of 5155. Males constitute 50% of the population and females 50%. Melamaiyur has an average literacy rate of 81%, higher than the national average of 59.5%: male literacy is 84%, and female literacy is 78%. In Melamaiyur, 8% of the population is under 6 years of age.
