= Charles Henry Collins =

British colonial civil servant (1887–1983)

Sir Charles Henry Collins CMG
- Born: 10 February 1887
- Died: 7 June 1983 (aged 96)
- Education: University of London
- Occupation: Colonial civil servant
- Years active: 1910–1948
- Children: 1 son and 2 daughters

Sir Charles Henry Collins CMG (10 February 1887 – 7 June 1983) was a British colonial administrator who served as both acting Financial and acting Chief Secretary of British Ceylon.

== Early life and education ==
Collins was born on 10 February 1887, the son of C.H.Collins of Torquay. He was educated at King's College School and University of London where he received his BA.

== Career ==
Collins joined the Ceylon Civil Service in 1910 and served in a variety of administrative posts including Government Agent. In the 1920s, he was involved in the preparation of the Manning Constitution which introduced constitutional reforms in Ceylon. In 1935, 1936, 1937, 1940, and 1943, he served as Acting Financial Secretary. In 1940, he was appointed Deputy Chief Secretary. In 1944, 1945 and 1947, he served as Acting Chief Secretary.

In 1947, he was appointed Adviser to the government in connection with the introduction of the new constitution which granted independence to Ceylon on the 4 February 1948. In order to accommodate the increase in the number of members of the legislature from 50 to over 100, he remodelled the interior of the Ceylon State Council building based on the plan of the British House of Commons.

Collins served as President of the Royal Asiatic Society of Ceylon (1942–1948). He retired in 1948.

== Personal life and death ==
Collins married Florence Campkin in 1913 and they had two daughters and a son.

Collins died on 7 June 1983 at West Clandon, Surrey, aged 96.

== Publications ==
- Public Administration in Ceylon (1951)
- Public Administration in Hong Kong (1952)

== Honours ==
Collins was appointed Companion of the Order of St Michael and St George (CMG) in the 1941 Birthday Honours. He was created a Knight Bachelor in the 1947 New Year Honours.
