= John Maude (civil servant) =

British civil servant

Sir Evelyn John Maude, KCB, KBE (1883 – 5 February 1963), commonly known as Sir John Maude, was a British civil servant.

Born in 1883, Maude was educated Rugby School and Exeter College, Oxford, where he studied classics, graduating in 1906. He was called to the bar in 1908. He entered the National Insurance Commission in 1911, serving there until it was merged into the Ministry of Health in 1919, where he was employed in the Solicitors Department. He served as the Solicitor and Legal Advisor to the Ministry from 1926 to 1934. He was then appointed a deputy secretary and was made chairman of the Ministry's advisory committee on town and country planning that year. From 1940 to 1945, he was permanent secretary of the Ministry. He then served as deputy chairman of the Local Government Boundary Commission in 1945.

Maude was appointed a Companion of the Order of the Bath (CB) in the 1929 Birthday Honours and promoted to Knight Commander (KCB) in the 1941 Birthday Honours; he was also appointed a Knight Commander of the Order of the British Empire (KBE) in the 1937 Coronation Honours.

Government offices
Preceded by Sir Maurice Gwyer	Solicitor and Legal Adviser, Ministry of Health; 1926–1934	Succeeded by Sir Thomas Harrison
Preceded by Sir George Chrystal	Permanent Secretary, Ministry of Health; 1940–1945	Succeeded by Sir William Douglas
