= Frederick Pearce =

British colonial administrator (1892–1964)

Sir Frederick Pearce CBE

Chief Secretary of Eritrea
- In office 1949–1952

Auditor-General of Burma
- In office 1947–1948

Personal details
- Born: 13 June 1892
- Died: 26 August 1964 (aged 72) Colchester, Essex
- Education: Balliol College, Oxford
- Occupation: Colonial administrator

Sir Charles Frederick Byrde Pearce (13 June 1892 – 26 August 1964) was a British colonial administrator who served as Auditor-General of Burma from 1947 to 1948 and Chief Secretary of Eritrea from 1949 to 1952.

== Early life and education ==
Pearce was born on 13 June 1892, the son of C. W. Pearce, a Doctor of Music at Trinity College of Music, London. He was educated at Marlborough College and Balliol College, Oxford of which he was an Exhibitioner.

== Career ==
Pearce served for the duration of the First World War with the Somerset Light Infantry in India. He entered the Indian Civil Service in 1920. In 1931, he was appointed deputy commissioner in Burma and in 1934 Finance Secretary to the Government of Burma.

At the outbreak of the Second World War, Pearce was serving as Secretary to the Governor of Burma. In 1941, he was appointed a commissioner and administered the refugee areas in North Assam and in 1943, he was Director of the Frontier Areas, Burma. In 1944, with the rank of Major-General, he was appointed head of the Civil Affairs Service, Burma (CAS(B)), a military body tasked with restoring civil administration after the Japanese forces withdrawal, providing food, water and medical supplies, restoring the police and reopening schools. He issued an arrest order for Aung San for which he was reprimanded by Mountbatten fearing it would lead to rebellion and was replaced in the post by Hubert Rance.

In 1946, Pierce was appointed counsellor to the Governor of Burma and served as a member of the committee on the Indo-Burma debt. In the following year, he was appointed Auditor-General of Burma, a post he held until his retirement from the Indian Civil Service in 1948.

In 1949, Pierce was appointed Chief Secretary of the British protectorate of Eritrea which was under British military administration and still trying to recover from the effects of war. He remained in the post until 1952.

== Personal life and death ==
Pearce married Olwen, widow of Lieut.-Colonel John Lawson of Skinner’s Horse in 1949.

Pearce died on 26 August 1964 at Colchester, Essex, aged 72.

== Honours ==
Pearce was created a Knight Bachelor in the 1948 New Year Honours. He was appointed Commander of the Order of the British Empire (CBE) in the 1941 Birthday Honours.

== See also ==
- British rule in Burma
