= Kolavai Lake =

Lake in Tamil Nadu, India

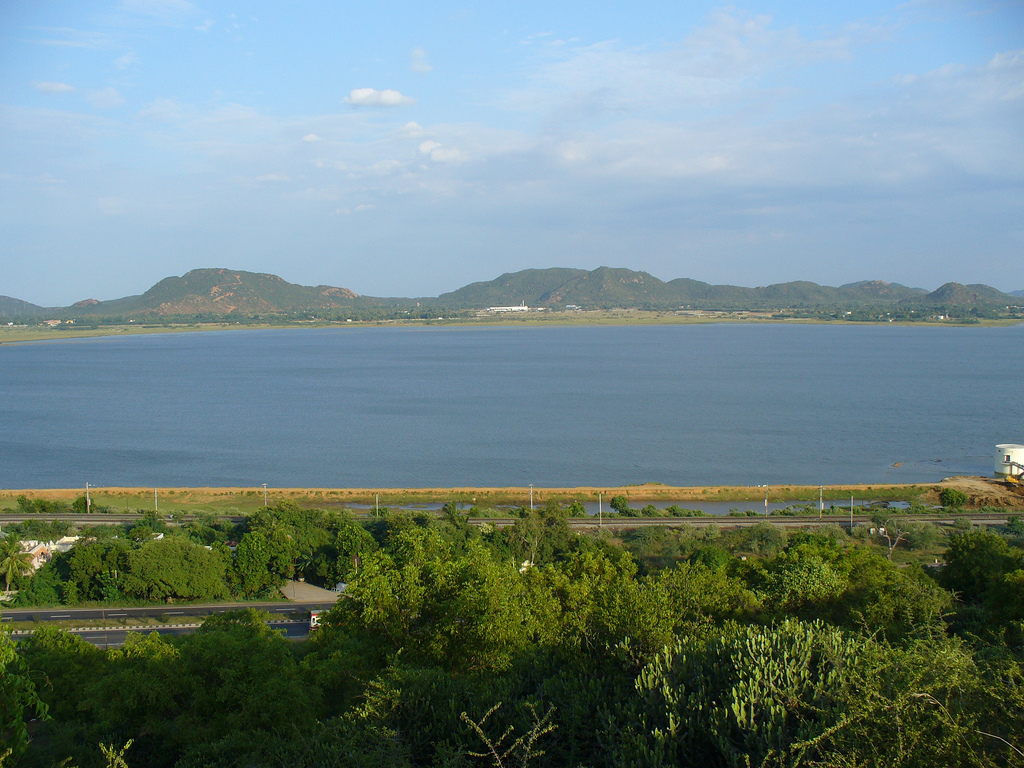

- Location within Tamil Nadu
- Location: Chengalpet district, Tamil Nadu, India
- Coordinates: 12.708°N 79.989°E

Kolavai Lake is a lake adjoining the town of Chengalpattu in Tamil Nadu, India. The lake is located about 60 kilometres (37 mi) from Chennai, and is close to Paranur railway station and Chengalpattu Junction railway station. During times of acute water shortage in summer, this lake serves as an additional source of water for the city of Chennai. The lake hosts migratory birds such as the whiskered tern, Indian spot-billed ducks, moorhens, coots, and small waders.
