= Tirumani =

Village in Tamil Nadu, India

Coordinates: 12.665829°N 79.988923°E

Tirumani is a suburb of Chennai located south of Chengalpattu, India.

According to Census 2011 information the location code or village code of Thirumani village is 629867. Thirumani village is located in Tirukalukundram Tehsil of Kancheepuram district in Tamil Nadu, India. Chengalpattu district and Tirukalukundram are the district & sub-district headquarters of Thirumani village respectively. As per 2009 stats, Thirumani village is also a gram panchayat.

The total geographical area of village is 444.74 hectares (1,100 acres). Thirumani has a total population of 3,362 peoples. There are about 854 houses in Thirumani village. Chengalpattu is nearest town to Thirumani which is approximately 4 km (2.5 miles) away.

Educational institution located near to Tirumani Village are Chengalpattu Government Law College located with distance of 1 km (0.62 miles) from Tirumani & Chengalpattu Government Medical College & Hospital also located with 2 km (1.2 miles) distance. Government Primary school is located in this village and about 50 students are studying as of 2017.
