= Eva Mary Bell =

Author (1877–1959)

Eva Mary Bell OBE (1877–1959), also known as John Travers, wrote about Sikhs in the First World War, included Sikh characters in her novels, and published articles on Sikh women she met during visits to Punjab in 1918 and 1919. She edited The Hamwood Papers of the Ladies of Llangollen (1930). Her husband, an officer in the Indian Army, served in Egypt and France during the First World War, was later invalided to India, and died there in 1916.
