= Manilal Balabhai Nanavati =

Indian executive

Manilal Balabhai Nanavati was an Indian social worker and freedom fighter who served as the Deputy Governor of the Reserve Bank of India.

== Early life ==
He was born in Bombay (now Mumbai) and educated at the university there. Her sister was Chandulal Nanavati. He was a co-author of the seminal book, The Indian Rural Problem.

== Career ==
=== Reserve Bank of India ===
He served as the Deputy Governor of the Reserve Bank of India from 21 December 1936, to 21 December 1941.

=== Dr Balabhai Nanavati Hospital ===
He founded Nanavati Hospital, located in Vile Parle, Mumbai, which was inaugurated by Jawaharlal Nehru in November 1950, and opened in May 1951. Dr. Balabhai Nanavati Hospital was later taken over by the Radiant Group.

== Bibliography ==
His notable books include:

- Rural life problems; personal experiences
- Group prejudices in India; a symposium
- Fifty years of co-operation in Kodinar Taluka, a case study
- Report on the agricultural indebtedness in the Baroda state

== Awards and honours ==
He was awarded a knighthood by King George VI at the 1941 Birthday Honours in 1941.
