= Herbert Brittain =

Brittain in 1956.

Sir Herbert Brittain, KCB, KBE (3 July 1894 – 6 September 1961) was a British civil servant. He was Second Secretary in HM Treasury from 1953 to 1957, in charge of home finance and supply expenditure.
