= Chengalpattu =

Chengalpattu Chengai (shortened) Chingleput Chengalpet
- Town
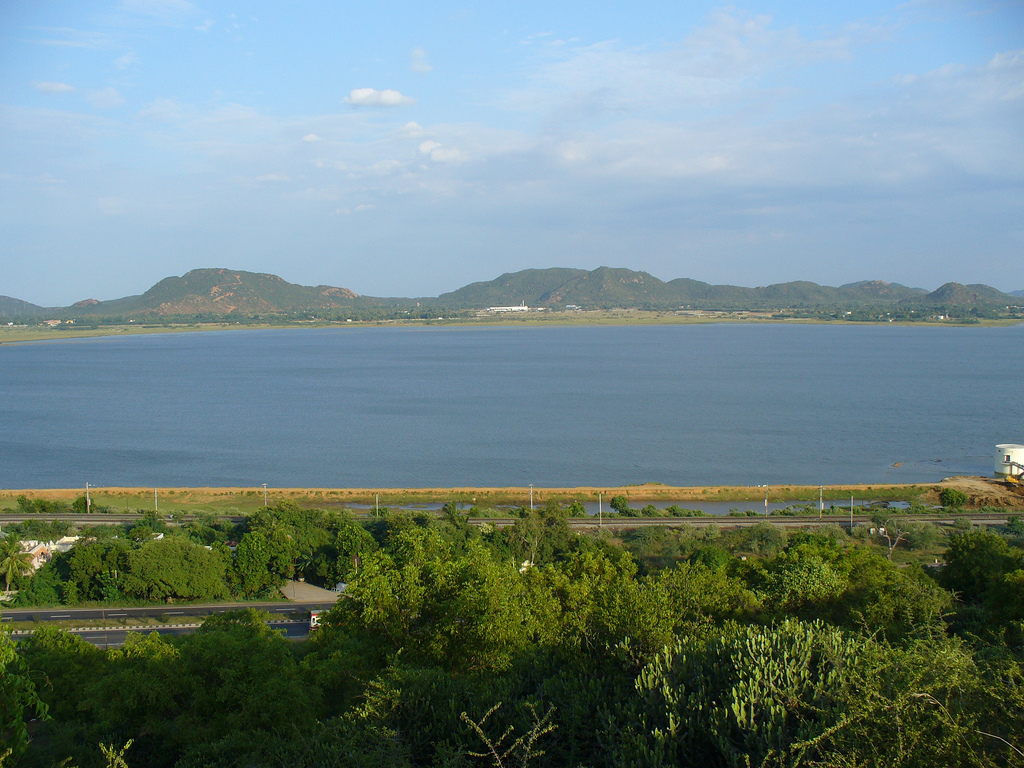
- Kolavai Lake on the outskirts of Chengalpattu
- Nicknames: Gateway of Chennai, Chengai, Lake City, City of Hills
- Chengalpattu (Tamil Nadu)
- Coordinates: 12°40′54.8″N 79°59′19.7″E
- Country: India
- State: Tamil Nadu
- Region: Pallava Nadu, Tondai Nadu
- District: Chengalpattu

Government
  - Type: First Grade Municipality
  - Body: Chengalpattu Municipality
  - District collector: Dr M Veerappan, IAS

Area
  - Total: 136.25 km^{2} (52.61 sq mi)
- Elevation: 66 m (217 ft)

Population (2011)
  - Total: 62,579
  - Density: 459.30/km^{2} (1,189.6/sq mi)
- Demonym: Chengalpattean

Languages
  - Official: Tamil
- Time zone: UTC+5:30 (IST)
- PIN: 603001, 603002, 603003, 603004
- Telephone code: +91-44
- Vehicle registration: TN-19
- Lok Sabha constituency: Kanchipuram
- Legislative assembly constituency: Chengalpattu
- Website: chengalpattu.nic.in

Chengalpattu, previously known as Chingleput or Chengalpet, is a town in Chennai metropolitan area and the headquarters of Chengalpattu district of the state Tamil Nadu, India. The town is located near the industrial and IT hub. It is the headquarters of the district and is 56 kilometres (35 mi) away from the state capital, Chennai on the National Highway 45.

It is an important commercial center. It has a medical college and other colleges affiliated with the University of Madras.

== Etymology ==
The City's original name is Chengazhuneerpattu. The city is believed to have been named after a lily called 'chengazhuneer poo' (செங்கழுநீர் பூ) which is found in the region. It is near the banks of Palar River about 56 km southwest of Chennai city (Madras) and thus Chengapattu is called the "Gateway of Chennai".

== History ==
Chengalpattu dates from the early Chola dynasty of the 2nd century BCE. Chengalpattu was formerly a capital of the kings of Vijayanagara, after their defeat by the Deccan sultanates at Battle of Talikota in 1565. The fortress at Chengalpattu, built by the Vijayanagara kings in the 16th century, was of strategic importance, owing to its swampy surroundings and the lake that flanked its side.

In 1639 a local governor or nayak, subject to these kings, granted a piece of coastal land to the British East India Company where Fort St George now stands, which became the nucleus of the city of Madras. Chengalpattu was taken by the French in 1751 and was retaken in 1752 by Robert Clive, after which it proved of great strategic advantage to the British, especially when Lally failed to capture the fortress in his advance on Madras.

During the wars of the British with Hyder Ali of Mysore, it withstood his assault and afforded a refuge to the nearby residents. In 1780, after the defeat of Colonel W Baillie, the army of Sir Hector Munro took refuge there. By 1900 the town was noted for its manufacture of pottery and was a local market center, especially of the rice trade. The surrounding district was home to cotton and silk weaving, indigo dyeing, tanneries, and a cigar factory, and extensive salt manufacturing took place along the coast.

The city was part of the Chengalpattu (Lok Sabha constituency) that existed from 1952 to 2004 in the Lok Sabha elections. Since 2009 it is a part of the Kancheepuram (Lok Sabha constituency).

Chengalpattu Municipality was extended for Greater Municipality on 24 August 2021 by annexing the villages of Anjur, Kunnavakkam, Thimmavaram, Thenmelpakkam, Vallam, Alapakkam, Thiruporur cross-road, Malalinatham, Nenmeli, Melamaiyur, Singaperumalkoil, Pulipakkam, Veerapuram, Pattaravakkam, Pazhaveli, Chettipunniyam, and Tirumani.

== Geography ==
Chengalpattu is located at 12.7°N 79.98°E. It has an average elevation of 36 metres (118 ft). Kolavai Lake is the largest lake within Chengalpattu town.

== Demographics ==
According to 2011 census, Chengalpattu had a population of 62,579 with a sex-ratio of 1,020 females for every 1,000 males, much above the national average of 929. A total of 5,884 were under the age of six, constituting 3,045 males and 2,839 females. Scheduled Castes and Scheduled Tribes accounted for 15.55% and 1.44% of the population respectively. The average literacy of the town was 83.25%, compared to the national average of 72.99%. The town had a total of 15675 households. There were a total of 23,937 workers, comprising 264 cultivators, 215 main agricultural labourers, 475 in house hold industries, 19,376 other workers, 3,607 marginal workers, 127 marginal cultivators, 66 marginal agricultural labourers, 175 marginal workers in household industries and 3,239 other marginal workers. As per the religious census of 2011, Chengalpattu had 85.33% Hindus, 6.09% Muslims, 6.48% Christians, 0.02% Sikhs, 0.13% Buddhists, 0.13% Jains, 1.79% following other religions and 0.02% following no religion or did not indicate any religious preference.

Religious census
Religion	Percent(%)
Hindu	85.33%
Muslim	6.09%
Christian	6.48%
Buddhist	0.13%
Jain	0.13%
Sikh	0.02%
Other	1.79%
No religion	0.02%

=== Religion ===
There are numerous temples, mosques and churches in Chengalpattu.

== Government and politics ==
Chengalpattu (state assembly constituency) is part of Kancheepuram (Lok Sabha constituency).

=== Civic services ===
Chengalpattu Government Hospital is a landmark and the largest government hospital in this district. The hospital has its own medical college. The town has the principal court of the district, and Dr. Ambedhkar Law College.

==== Hospitals ====
- Chengalpattu Medical College and Hospital
- Government Leprosy Hospital

== Economy ==
=== Industry ===
There are several modern industries around Chengalpattu, due to the town's proximity to Chennai and its frequent connectivity to other places through rail and road.

Several companies in and around the town like Al-Ohm Inc., Tech Mahindra, Wipro, BMW, Ford, Flextronics, Foxconn, Dell, Samsung, Infosys, Pepsi, TVS, Siemens, Nissan Renault, RLT Instrumentation, Apollo Tyres, Mahindra, Medopharm Pvt Ltd, R & D, Bay forge have production plants near Chengalpattu. Marg Swarnabhoomi SEZ at Kodur have several industries like DHL, Zwilling J. A. Henckels.

In September 2021, the Ministry of Industry announced development of a SIDCO industrial estate at Kodur Village, which would provide employment to over 2000 people.

== Culture ==
=== Tourist attractions ===
Today Chengalpattu has developed as a tourist spot for many foreign travellers on their way to Mamallapuram, Thirukazhukundram, Vedanthangal Bird Sanctuary and Kanchipuram, Karikili Bird Sanctuary.

The boat house established by Tamil Nadu Tourism Development Corporation (TTDC) in the Kolavai lake which is alongside the NH 45 highway has turned into a place where people can relax with their families on weekends. The monsoon rains flooded the gates of the lake in December 2005 due to which the TTDC boat club operation has been stopped. It also serves as a bridge connecting all nearby districts with the renowned tourist places like Mahabalipuram, Muttukadu, theme parks on East Coast Road (ECR), Thirukazhukundram, and Kanchipuram.

==== Kolavai Lake ====
Kolavai Lake is the second largest lake in the Chengalpattu District after Madhuranthagam Lake. Kolavai Lake is well known for its perennial nature: There are records of going dry in summers. It even supplies water to industries in Chennai when the lakes in Chennai go dry. The lake is now being polluted due to the rapid urbanisation of Chengalpattu. The early morning sunrise and the moon hovering above the lake over its waters in the night are scenic to the eyes. The lake's beauty can be experienced by taking a train from the Chengalpattu station to Paranur.

=== Archaeological excavations ===
Chengalpattu has received attention recently because of archaeological finds in the nearby village of Chettimedu Pathur. In February 2024, an ancient burial site of a child with a pot beside it likely dating back to the Neolithic period was unearthed at Chettimedu Pathur.

== Transport ==
Chenglapattu is connected by road and rail.

=== By air ===
The Chennai Airport lies just 38 km north of the town and can be reached in about 1 hour by road.

=== By rail ===
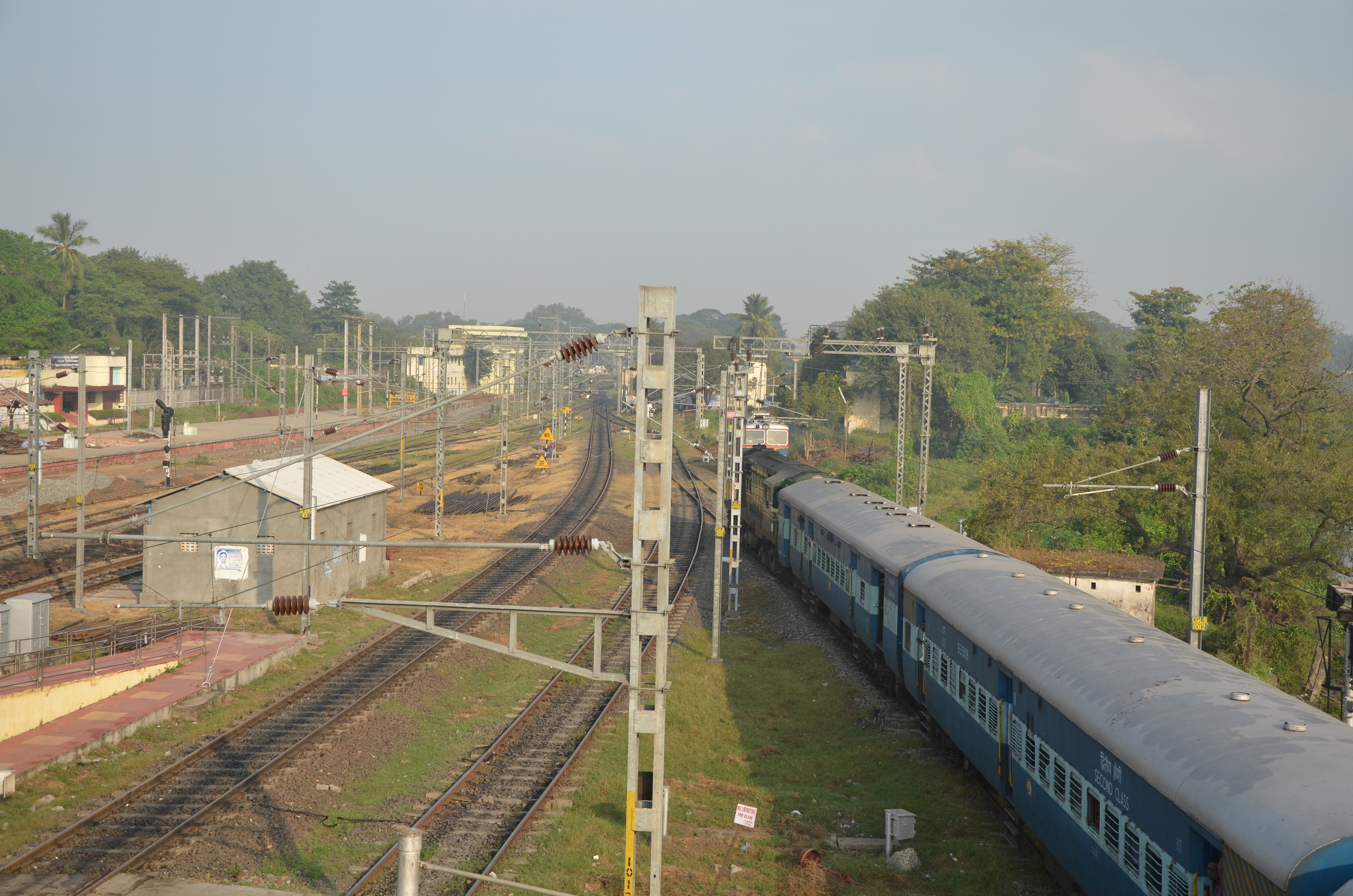
View of the Chengalpattu Railway Junction, one of the main stations in the Chord Line

Chengalpattu Railway Station, technically known as CGL, is one of the major railway junctions of the Southern Railway and is a nationally important halt.

Chengalpattu railway junction lies in the Main Broad Gauge line and most of the south bound trains stop here. There is a railway connection to Arakkonam via Kanchipuram. There are many trains running from Chengalpattu to Chennai Beach Station. stopping at all stations up to Chennai city Tambaram. Express trains are available, running from Chengalpattu to Chennai city area's Tambaram, Guindy, Mambalam, Egmore, Park and finally Beach Station.

=== By road ===
There are many buses connecting Chengalpattu with other parts of the state and beyond. Kanchipuram - Chengalpattu road (State Highway - 58) is used to connect the city of Kanchipuram and Chengalpattu. Government MTC Buses and private buses which go to and from cities like Kanchipuram, Vellore, and Tirupati can be seen frequently along this route. The town of Mahabalipuram lies 29 km away from Chengalpattu and is connected through SH58.

== Education ==
Various educational institutions are in Chengalpattu like schools, engineering colleges, dental and medical colleges, and arts/science colleges.

=== Arts and science ===
- Rajeswari Vedachalam Government Arts College
- Vidyasagar Women's College

=== Law ===
- Government Law College, Chengalpattu

=== Medical ===
- Chengalpet Government Medical College
- Karpaga Vinayaga Institute of Medical Science
- National Institute for Empowerment of Persons with Multiple Disabilities (Govt of India - Ministry Of Social Justice and Empowerment)

=== Dental ===
- Asan Memorial Dental College and Hospital
- Karpaga Vinayaga Institute of Dental Science

=== Nursing ===
- Karpaga Vinayaga Institute of Nursing
- School of Nursing, Chengalpattu Government Hospital
- Government College of Nursing

=== Engineering ===
- Asan Memorial College of Engineering & Technology

=== Schools ===
- Sri Ramakrishna Mission Vidyalaya Matriculation Higher Secondary School, Chengalpattu.
- Swamy Vivekananda Vidhyalaya Matric School, Chengalpattu
- Sri Ramakrishna Boys.Hr.Sec.school
- Seventh Day Adventist Matric. Hr. Sec.School, Chengalpattu
- Blessings Matric Hr. Sec. School
- Brindhavan Public School
- CSI Alison Cassie Girls Higher Secondary School
- CSI St. Hilda's & St. Hugh's Matric Hr.Sec. School
- Government Girls Hr. Sec. School
- Guardian International Nursery School
- Little Jacky Matric. Hr. Sec. School
- Maharishi Vidhya Mandir School
- Mahindra World School
- Prasan Vidhya Mandir School
- RLT Academy Matric. Hr. Sec. School
- Sri Ramakrishna Mission Boys Hr. Sec. School
- Sri Ramakrishna Mission Girls Hr. Sec. School
- St. Columba's Hr. Sec. School
- CSI St. Hilda's & St. Hugh's Matric.Hr.Sec.School
- St.Joseph's Matric. Hr. Sec. School
- Dr. MGR Nursery and Primary School, Perungalatore.
- St.Mary's Girls Hr. Sec. School
- St.Mary's Primary School
- St.Paul's Academy (CBSE)
- St.Paul's Matriculation School
- SCAD World School
- St. Ann's Matric Hr. Sec.School
- Vidhya Sagar Global School
- Annai Sathya School
- Barathi School
- Shree Vidya Mandir Matric. Hr.Sec.School

== Notable persons ==
- O. V. Alagesan, member of first Constituent Assembly of India, born in Chengalpattu
- Nassar, Indian film actor, director and producer, born in Chengalpattu
- Waheeda Rehman, Indian actress born in Chengalpattu
- General Krishnaswamy Sundarji, Chief of the Army Staff (India) from 1986 to 1988, born in Chengalpattu
