= The Royal Naval Benevolent Trust =

The Royal Naval Benevolent Trust (RNBT) is a charity registered established under Royal Charter in 1922 in the United Kingdom for the welfare of current and past naval personnel and their families.

It supports needy members of the "RNBT Family", that is all ratings and other ranks of the Royal Navy or Royal Marines, their spouses and dependant children, from enlistment until death. This support may be given through financial aid as one-off grants or regular payments to supplement the income of older people, support to other organisations which assist the "RNBT Family", residential care of elderly people at the RNBT's own residential nursing home, Pembroke House, at Gillingham, Kent and advice on welfare matters. See www.rnbt.org.uk for more information.

In 2016/2017 the Trust's total income was £5.6m, including £1.7m in grants, which included just under £1m from Greenwich Hospital and over £0.6m from joint funding from Greenwich Hospital and the Royal Navy and Royal Marines Charity. Total expenditure was £5.3m: £1.6m on grants to individuals and £2.7m providing residential and nursing care.
