= Stier =

Stier (German for bull) may refer to:

- Elizabeth Fleming Stier Award, German
- German auxiliary cruiser Stier

== Surnames ==
- Dieter Stier (born 1964), German politician
- Hubert Oswald Stier (1838-1907), German architect
- Wilhelm Stier (1799-1856), German architect

== See also ==
- Stier (surname)
