= Stier (surname) =

Stier: German: Stier means "bull"

- Elizabeth Fleming Stier, American food scientist & author
- Alfons Stier (1877–1952), German composer; (de)
- Christoph Stier (1941–2021), Lutheran bishop; (de)
- Davor Ivo Stier (born 1972), Croatian politician
- Ernst Stier (1877–??), German manor owner, politician; (de)
- Fridolin Stier (1902–1981), Catholic theologian; (de)
- Fritz Stier-Somlo (1873–1932), Hungarian-Austrian lawyer; (de)
- Gothart Stier (1938–2023), German conductor; (de)
- Hans-Martin Stier (born 1950), German actor, singer; (de)
- Hubert Stier (1838–1907), German architect; (de)
- Marco Stier (born 1984), German footballer
- Rudolf Ewald Stier (1800–1862), German Protestant churchman, mystic
- Norbert Stier (born 1953), German general
- Wilhelm Stier (1799-1856), German architect

== See also ==
- Ochs (surname)
- Ochsner
- Oxman
