= Lucy Partington =

English student and victim of murder (1952–1973)

Lucy Katherine Partington
- Partington, pictured at Fountains Abbey in the summer of 1973
- Born: 4 March 1952; St Albans, Hertfordshire, England
- Died: c. 2 January 1974 (aged 21); Cromwell Street, Gloucester, England; 51.86180°N 2.24346°W (approximate)
- Resting place: Hailes Chapelyard, Tewkesbury, Gloucestershire, England; 51.96974°N 1.92798°W (approximate)
- Education: Exeter University
- Occupation: University student
- Known for: Victim of serial murder
- Height: 5 ft 4 in (160 cm)

Lucy Katherine Partington (4 March 1952 – c. 2 January 1974) was a British woman from Gretton, Gloucestershire, who was abducted and murdered by serial killers Frederick and Rosemary West on the evening of 27 December 1973. Partington was either lured or forced from a bus stop along the A435 trunk road into the Wests' vehicle and driven to their home in Cromwell Street, Gloucester. She was restrained in the basement of the property and subjected to various acts of rape and sadomasochism before she was murdered by either asphyxiation or strangulation. Circumstantial evidence indicates she may have been held captive for up to six days before her murder.

Partington's extensively dismembered body was discovered buried in an alcove of the Wests' cellar on 6 March 1994. She was later buried in the grounds of Hailes Chapelyard in Tewkesbury, Gloucestershire.

== Early life ==
Lucy Partington was born in St Albans, the second child born to Roger (14 August 1924 - 25 March 2012) and Margaret (née Bardwell) Partington. She had one sister, Marian, and two younger brothers, David and Mark. Her father was a lecturer in industrial chemistry and her mother worked in an architect's office. One year after Partington's birth, her family relocated from St Albans to Bishop's Cleeve. (Note: One of Partington's uncles was novelist Kingsley Amis; her cousin, Martin, would also become a noted novelist.) Roger and Margaret Partington would divorce in the 1960s. Her father would later relocate to North Yorkshire; her mother—who later remarried—remained in Gloucestershire.

The Partington family were upper middle class and markedly wealthy, and the parents instilled virtuous values in their children. Both Partington sisters attended Gretton Infant School before progressing to Pate's Grammar School for Girls, and both were ardent scholars, although her older sister Marian would later describe herself as "the bossy older sister" and by far the more "free-spirited" of the two, whereas "Lucy was quite quiet and always making things. She loved to make little bridles for our toy horse."

Partington was studious and religious. She was 5 ft 4 in (160 cm) in height, bespectacled, with long, dark brown, curly hair. Although friendly with her male peers, she is not known to have ever had a boyfriend. Her mother would state her daughter held aspirations for marriage, yet held "high standards" and speculated this was due to the fact she would "not accept second best" in anybody she would date.

=== University studies ===
At the age of 19, Partington opted to continue her studies by studying medieval English at Exeter University. She commenced her studies at this establishment in September 1971 and by the autumn of 1973, had begun her third and final year of study at Exeter University. In November 1973, Partington—a devout Christian—converted to the Roman Catholic faith.

On 20 December, Partington returned from Exeter to Gloucestershire to spend Christmas with her mother, stepfather and younger siblings, with view to travelling to North Yorkshire on 28 December to visit her father, before returning to Exeter University to resume her studies on 3 January.

== 27 December 1973 ==
On the afternoon of 27 December 1973, Partington visited the home of a close friend named Helen Elizabeth Render in the Cheltenham suburb of Pittville; that evening, the two discussed their future study and career plans, and Partington filled out an application form to further her studies the following year at the Courtauld Institute of Art in London, where she hoped to study medieval art history. She then shared supper with the Renders before leaving the household shortly after 10 p.m., intending to catch the 10:20 p.m. bus to her mother's home in Gretton. The bus stop was a three-minute walk from the Render household and Partington knew that, should she miss her bus, her friend's father would be willing to give her a lift to her mother's home.

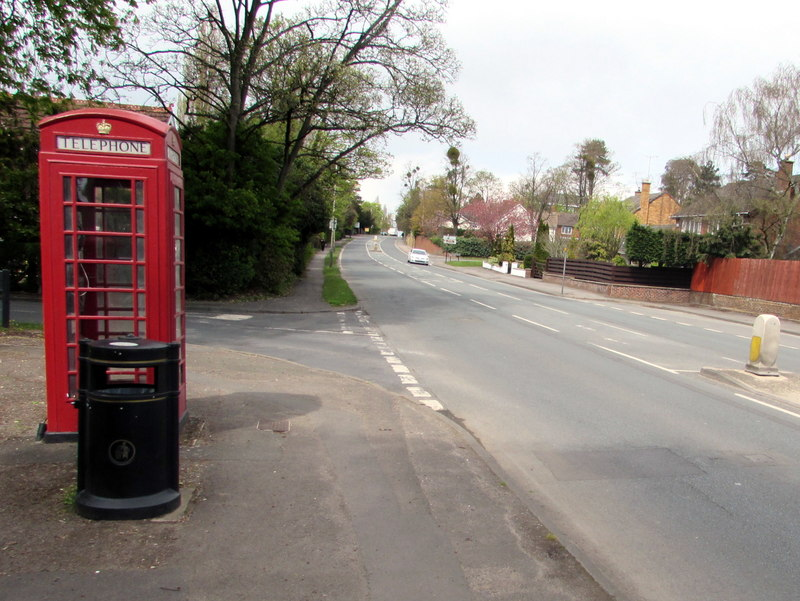
Evesham Road, Pittville. Partington was abducted from a bus stop on this road on the evening of 27 December 1973.

An eyewitnesses—a man walking his dog along Albemarle Gate—later informed police he had seen Partington walking along the sleet-covered streets en route to the bus stop on Evesham Road. (Note: Partingtom invariably caught a bus home from this stop when travelling home from the Render household.) She wore a terracotta-coloured raincoat, pink flared jeans, and red mittens, and was carrying a faded brown canvas satchel which held her application form. Shortly thereafter, she was abducted from the bus stop by serial killers Frederick and Rosemary West, who themselves are known to have been returning from a Christmas visit to Rosemary's parents on the evening of Partington's abduction.

=== Abduction ===
The precise circumstances surrounding how Partington was abducted are unknown, and both her family and friends would later insist she would have been reluctant to enter a vehicle with people she did not know—even with another female in the vehicle. (Note: One of Partington's front teeth was later discovered to have been dislodged from her maxilla, indicating she had been punched in the face at least once either prior to entering the Wests' vehicle, while inside the car, or when inside their home.) However, the bus she had expected to catch that evening is known to have been ten minutes late, and Partington may have initially entered the Wests' vehicle out of desperation. Moreover, the fact Rosemary West had given birth to her third child just four months previously, and may have had the baby and her two toddler daughters with her in the vehicle, may have allayed any sense of fear Partington would otherwise have felt.

== Murder ==
Partington's exact cause of and date of death are unknown, although she most likely died of either asphyxiation, strangulation or as a result of the indignities inflicted upon her before her body was extensively dismembered and buried in a cubical grave approximately three feet in depth within the cellar of the Wests' property. The grave itself was located between two sewage pipes.

Items discovered upon and around Partington's body indicated she had been gagged with sections of cloth and several lengths of adhesive tape three-quarters of an inch in width had been wrapped around her face and head, forming what was described in her 1994 autopsy report as an "oval mask", sixteen inches in circumference, which covered her face. Her limbs were also restrained with lengths of cord, and a length of rope also recovered from the grave indicated she may have been suspended from the wooden beams which supported the ceiling of the cellar prior to her death.

Strong circumstantial evidence exists to indicate Partington was kept alive for up to six days prior to her death. Furthermore, although Fred West only held vague recollections of whom the other victims buried in his cellar had been in life, according to author Colin Wilson, he "seemed to know a great deal more about [Partington]", suggesting he and his wife had extensively conversed with her prior to subduing her. In addition, at 12:25 a.m. on 3 January 1974, Fred West admitted himself into the casualty unit of the Gloucestershire Royal Hospital with a deep laceration wound to his right hand which required several stitches, leading to speculation Partington was murdered sometime during 2 January 1974, having endured six days of captivity and abuse prior to her death.

Missing persons poster distributed throughout South West England and the West Midlands in efforts to locate Partington

== Investigation ==
When Partington failed to return home, her mother quickly became concerned for her welfare. Upon telephoning the Render household shortly before midnight only to learn she had left their house to catch the bus home at approximately 10:10 p.m., her mother became frantic. She was reported missing to Gloucester Police early the following morning. Her father—whom Partington had intended to visit on 28 December—travelled from North Yorkshire to Gloucestershire to assist in the search for his daughter and conduct public appeals for information as to her whereabouts. Partington's mother also publicly appealed for her daughter's safe return, on one occasion informing the media: "How anyone could just vanish in three minutes completely baffles me."

Police rapidly determined Partington's disappearance was involuntary, and an extensive investigation was launched to locate her, with numerous officers assigned full-time to the case. In a press conference held shortly after Partington's disappearance, Chief Superintendent William Turner informed the media: "We must assume that some harm has come to her. From what we have been told by her relatives and friends, she is not the type of girl that would disappear voluntarily."

Partington's disappearance generated significant regional publicity, and police conducted extensive house-to-house inquiries in and around Cheltenham, with local terrain and landmarks explored by search and rescue dogs and underwater units, and a televised reconstruction of her movements broadcast regionally. One initial line of inquiry as to Partington's potential whereabouts sourced from a tip given to investigators by a local coach driver on the weekend of 29–30 December; this individual informed police that a young woman closely matching Partington's description had boarded his London-bound coach on 28 December and had alighted the vehicle with another young woman upon the coach's arrival at Uxbridge. Police briefly investigated, but soon discounted this lead.

Although the publicity surrounding Partington's disappearance generated several leads of inquiry, all failed to bear fruit. By the mid 1970s, the investigation into her disappearance had largely become cold. Nonetheless, the case remained open, and subject to periodic review.

== Discovery ==
Partington's remains were discovered buried in an alcove of the Wests' cellar at 9:02 a.m. on 6 March 1994. Her body was the sixth uncovered at the property and the third recovered from the cellar. The mask of cloth and adhesive tape affixed to her face and head prior to her abuse and murder was still wrapped around her skull, with sections of knotting affixed beneath her jaw. A distinctive Richardson Sheffield stainless steel kitchen knife with an eight-inch blade which Fred used to dismember her body and had evidently dropped into the cubic grave as he injured himself while dismembering her body was also discovered alongside her remains. Seventy-two of Partington's bones—including one of her shoulder blades and three ribs—were missing, and were never recovered.

=== Identification ===
In efforts to identify the skeletal remains uncovered at Cromwell Street, investigators checked all national missing persons register records of young Caucasian women who had disappeared in the 1970s and 1980s, with particular focus upon women reported missing from the Gloucestershire area in the 1970s. Partington's name was one of the earliest names investigators considered as a possible match for one of the decedents, with some of the officers assigned to the West inquiry having participated in the original search for her. Her body was formally identified in late March 1994. Upon learning of the formal identification of his daughter's body, Roger Partington informed the media: "The grief is still there, but uncertainty is worse."

== Aftermath ==
Fred West committed suicide on New Year's Day 1995 while on remand at HM Prison Birmingham. At the time of his death, he had been charged with twelve murders, and his wife with nine.

Rosemary West was brought to trial before Mr Justice Mantell at Winchester Crown Court on 3 October 1995. She was charged with ten murders, including that of Lucy Partington in addition to those of her own daughter, Heather, and stepdaughter, Charmaine. All the murders for which she was tried had been committed between 1971 and 1987, and almost all—including Partington's—had been committed with an evident sexual motive.

"There is no basis for thinking, however, that [Partington] was necessarily killed on the day she was abducted. It is perfectly feasible, and we submit from the evidence, a legitimate conclusion ... that once taken she was kept alive, for whatever hideous purpose, for some days."

— Brian Leveson, prosecutor at Rosemary West's trial, outlining Partington's murder on behalf of the Crown. 6 October 1995.

Partington's murder was discussed in depth at Rosemary West's trial, with prosecutor Brian Leveson describing her as "a gentle and chaste girl" who would have been unwilling to voluntarily accompany the Wests to their home. In reference to the extensive and prolonged sadomasochistic abuse inflicted upon Partington prior to her death, Leveson stated she had been restrained for the Wests' "hideous purposes", adding she had been used as a "sexual plaything" by the couple.

On 21 and 22 November 1995, Rosemary West was unanimously convicted of each murder for which she had been brought to trial and sentenced to life in prison, with Mr Justice Mantell informing her at her sentencing: "If attention is paid to what I think, you will never be released. Take her down."

Lucy Partington's body was reburied in Hailes, Gloucestershire, on 16 February 1995. Her body was reburied alongside two of her childhood teddies and a blanket she had also cherished as a child, plus a section of heather and wool. She was interred beneath an arched headstone bearing a crucifix and inscribed with her full name, year of birth and death and a serif inscription of a poem she had penned shortly before her death: "Things are as big as you make them. I can fill a whole body, a whole day of life, with worry about a few words on one scrap of paper. Yet, the same evening, looking up, I can frame my fingers to fit the sky in my cupped hands."

Partington's close friend, Helen Render, died of natural causes in 1976 at the age of 21.

Marian Partington later became deeply active within—and an advocate for—The Forgiveness Project; a UK-based charitable organization which explores the concepts of forgiveness and reconciliation as alternatives to enduring hatred and desires for revenge via authentic case studies of both victims and perpetrators of violent crime. Via her work with The Forgiveness Project, she has spoken in both schools and prisons and—in 2012—at the project's annual lecture.

Marian also wrote about the impact of her sister's life, disappearance, and death in her 2012 memoir, If You Sit Very Still. The book builds on a previous essay she had written and which had been published in May 1996 titled Salvaging the Sacred. (Note: The essay Salvaging the Sacred ultimately inspired a play by Bryony Lavery. This play, Frozen, premiered in 1998. A feature film by Juliet McKoen, also entitled Frozen and also inspired by the essay Salvaging the Sacred, was released in March 2005.)

Partington's first cousin, Martin Amis, formally dedicated his 1995 novel The Information to her memory; he also wrote extensively about her life and death in his memoir Experience.

== See also ==
- Cold case
- Fred West
- List of solved missing person cases (1970s)

== Cited works and further reading ==
- Amis, Martin (2000). Experience. Vintage. ISBN 978-0-099285-82-3.
- Bennett, John (2005). The Cromwell Street Murders: The Detective's Story. Sutton Publishing. ISBN 978-0-750-94273-7.
- Blundell, Nigel (1996). Encyclopedia of Serial Killers. London: PRC Publishing. ISBN 978-1-85648-328-5.
- Burn, Gordon (1998). Happy Like Murderers. London: Faber and Faber. ISBN 978-0-571-19546-6.
- Campbell, Duncan, ed. (1996). "Murder in Mind – Fred & Rosemary West". Murder in Mind (1). Marshall Cavendish. ISSN 1364-5803.
- Cantacuzino, Marina (2015). The Forgiveness Project: Stories for a Vengeful Age. Jessica Kingsley Publishers. ISBN 978-1-784-50006-1.
- Cherry, Stephen (2012). Healing Agony: Re-Imagining Forgiveness. Bloomsbury Academic. ISBN 978-1-441-11938-4.
- Cresswell, Kim (2015). Garden of Bones: The Story of Fred and Rosemary West. KC Publishing. ISBN 978-0-995-05780-7.
- Fido, Martin (1995). Chronicle of Twentieth Century Murder. London: Bracken Publishing. pp. 124–125. ISBN 978-1-858-91390-2.
- Furio, Jennifer (2001). Team Killers: A Comparative Study of Collaborative Criminals. New York: Algora Publishing. pp. 26–37. ISBN 978-1-892-94162-6.
- Goatley, Leo (2019). Understanding Fred & Rose West: Noose, Lamella & the Gilded Cage. Leicestershire: Troubador Publishing Limited. ISBN 978-1-913-20862-2.
- Masters, Brian (1996). She Must Have Known: Trial of Rosemary West. London: Doubleday. ISBN 978-0-385-40650-5.
- Mitchell, Margaret (2011). Remember Me: Constructing Immortality - Beliefs on Immortality, Life, and Death. Oxfordshire: Taylor & Francis. ISBN 978-1-136-92085-1.
- Partington, Marian (2012). If You Sit Very Still. Vala Publishing Co-operative. ISBN 978-1-908-36302-2.
- Sounes, Howard (1995). Fred and Rose: The Full Story of Fred and Rose West and the Gloucester House of Horrors. London: Warner Books. ISBN 978-0-7515-1322-6.
- West, Anne Marie; Hill, Virginia (1995). Out of the Shadows: Fred West's Daughter Tells Her Harrowing Story of Survival. New York: Simon & Schuster. ISBN 0-671-85516-6.
- Wilson, Colin (1998). The Corpse Garden. London: True Crime Library. ISBN 978-1-874358-24-4.
- Wilson, Colin; Seaman, Donald (2007). The Serial Killers: A Study in the Psychology of Violence. London: Virgin Books. ISBN 978-0-753-51321-7.
- Wilson, Colin; Wilson, Damon (2007). The World's Most Evil Murderers: Real-Life Stories of Infamous Killers. Bath: Parragon Publishing. pp. 141–146. ISBN 978-1-405-48828-0.
- Woodrow, Jane (2011). Rose West: The Making of a Monster. Hodder & Stoughton. ISBN 978-0-340-99248-7.
