= Frozen (play) =

1998 play by Bryony Lavery

- Original language: English
- Written by: Bryony Lavery
- Characters: Agnetha Gottmundsdottir; Ingrid Shirley; Guard; Nancy Shirley; Ralph Wantage; Voice of David Nabkus
- Setting: Present-day England

Premiere
- Date: 1 May 1998
- Place: Birmingham Repertory Theatre

Frozen is a play by British playwright Bryony Lavery that presents the disappearance of a 10-year-old girl, Rhona Shirley, and the aftermath of her death. The play follows Rhona's mother and the killer over the years that follow. They are linked by a doctor who is studying what causes men to commit such crimes. The themes of the play include emotional paralysis and forgiveness.

In 2022, The Independent included Frozen on its list of the 40 best plays ever written.

== Productions ==
The play was first performed at Birmingham Repertory Theatre in 1998 and won the Best New Play Award from the Theatrical Management Association. It later made its debut at the National Theatre's Cottesloe Theatre on 3 July 2002.

The play was revived at the Theatre Royal Haymarket starring Jason Watkins, Suranne Jones and Nina Sosanya for a strictly limited season from February 2018.

Frozen opened Off-Broadway in February 2004 at the Manhattan Class Company Theatre starring Swoosie Kurtz, Brían F. O'Byrne and Laila Robins. It transferred to Broadway in May and closed in August 2004. Frozen was nominated for a Tony Award for Best Play in 2004, and earned a Tony Award for Best Featured Actor in a Play (Brían F. O'Byrne).

== Plot and characters ==
The story is set in present-day England and involves three main characters: a serial killer named Ralph Wantage, who kidnaps and murders a young girl; the murdered girl's mother, Nancy Shirley; and a New York psychiatrist, Agnetha Gottmundsdottir, who travels to England to examine Wantage. As the three lives slowly intersect, the characters gradually change and become "unfrozen". They come to terms with the idea of forgiveness.

The script begins in monologues, each person showing his or her side of the story; the audience sees each person's story intertwine as they connect with one another.

== Allegations of plagiarism ==
In September 2004, media sources around the world (including The Times, The Observer, The New York Times, and the Associated Press) reported allegations that Lavery had plagiarized significant portions (nearly 675 words) of the play from a 1997 The New Yorker article by Malcolm Gladwell about psychiatrist Dorothy Lewis, and from Lewis's book Guilty by Reason of Insanity (1998).

Lewis claimed that Frozen was based in large part on her life and that the play lifted both themes and verbatim passages from both sources. However, after interviewing Lavery, Gladwell wrote a second New Yorker article in which he characterized Lavery's appropriation as "permissible borrowing." Lavery, for her part, acknowledged that she drew all three characters from existing sources. For the character of Ralph, she drew on the book The Murder of Childhood by Ray Wyre and Tim Tate. For the character of Nancy, she drew on an article in The Guardian by Marian Partington, whose sister Lucy had been murdered by serial killers Fred and Rosemary West. For the character of psychiatrist Agnetha, Lavery drew on the Gladwell article. "I wanted [the play] to be accurate", she told Gladwell.

== Reviews ==
*"[A] big, brave, compassionate play about grief, revenge, forgiveness and bearing the unbearable." -- The Guardian

The TalkinBroadway reviewer of a Florida production wrote: "[A] powerful drama ... about three people living the human condition... a story that needs to continue to be told."

In 2022, The Independent included Frozen on its list of the 40 best plays ever written.

== Awards and nominations ==
=== Original Off-Broadway production ===
Year	Award	Category	Nominee	Result
2004	Drama Desk Award	Outstanding Actor in a Play	Brian F. O'Byrne	Nominated

=== Original Broadway production ===
Year	Award	Category	Nominee	Result
2004	Tony Award	Best Play		Nominated
2004	Tony Award	Best Actress in a Play	Swoosie Kurtz	Nominated
2004	Tony Award	Best Featured Actor in a Play	Brian F. O'Byrne	Won
2004	Tony Award	Best Direction of a Play	Doug Hughes	Nominated
