= Marian Partington =

English writer (born 1948)

Marian Partington (born 21 February 1948) is an English writer, and the sister of Lucy Partington, who was abducted by Fred and Rosemary West on 27 December 1973 and murdered by them in the final days of 1973 or the first days of 1974.

In May 2012, she wrote about the impact of Lucy’s life, disappearance and death in her memoir, If You Sit Very Still. The book builds on Salvaging the Sacred, an essay written by Marian and published in The Guardian Weekend in May 1996. The essay inspired a play, by Bryony Lavery and a feature film, directed by Juliet McKoen, both entitled Frozen.

In April 2012, prior to the publication of her memoir, Marian was interviewed in the Financial Times magazine.

In November 2012 the former archbishop of Canterbury, Rowan Williams, cited If You Sit Very Still by Marian Partington as one of his books of the year in the Times Literary Supplement.

In 2004, Partington’s story was featured in The F Word exhibition; The Forgiveness Project's exhibition which explores forgiveness in the face of atrocity.

She works as a storyteller, in schools and prisons, for The Forgiveness Project, a charitable organisation which explores forgiveness, reconciliation and conflict resolution through real-life human experience. Partington has forgiven one of her sister's killers, Rosemary West, but she did not reply and got the prison where she is serving a life sentence to tell Partington she doesn't want her to write again.

In contrast though, Partington exchanges Christmas cards with one of Fred West's daughters, and West's younger brother, Douglas, got in touch with Partington when she wrote to him, saying he hoped something good could come out of all this evil.

Marian is a Quaker and a Buddhist.
