= Nell I. Mondy =

American biochemist (1921-2005)

- Mondy & potatoes, Cornell University
- Born: Nell Irene Mondy; 27 October 1921; Pocahontas, Arkansas, U.S.
- Died: 25 August 2005 (aged 83); Ithaca, New York, U.S.
- Education: Ouachita Baptist University; University of Texas at Austin; Cornell University
- Known for: Research on the potato, Nutrition
- Awards: Honorary Life Member of the Potato Association of America (1983); Honorary Member of the Graduate Women in Science (1986); Elizabeth Fleming Stier Award(1997)
- Scientific career
- Fields: Chemistry, biochemistry, food science
- Workplaces: Frito-Lay; Procter & Gamble; Cornell University; Florida State University; R.T. French Comp, French's; USDA; Environmental Protection Agency

Nell I. Mondy (October 27, 1921 – August 25, 2005) was an American biochemist known for her expertise regarding the potato. She spent the majority of her profession at Cornell University where in 1953 she earned a PhD in biochemistry and subsequently served as faculty there for nearly fifty years. She also worked as a consultant with R.T. French company and the Environmental Protection Agency. In 1997, she received the first Elizabeth Fleming Stier Award.

Mondy published widely on topics such as the chemical and nutritional content of potatoes and how they are affected by soil amendments in soil and packaging. She helped to set up the first International Food Congress in 1960 and worked internationally in countries including Indonesia, Mauritius, Ivory Coast and Nigeria. She was a fellow of the American Association for the Advancement of Science and the Institute of Food Technologists. Her books include Experimental Food Chemistry and an autobiography, You Never Fail Until You Stop Trying: The Story of a Pioneer Women Chemist.

== Biography ==
Mondy was born in Pocahontas, Arkansas to her father, Daly (sometimes recorded as Daley) who worked as the county tax assessor and mother, Ethel Caroll Mondy (born February 19, 1889). Her father died of tuberculosis in 1924 when Nell was not yet 3 years old. After his death her mother took up work as a journalist. Ethel Mondy continued to live with Nell throughout the many locations her work took her.

In 1943, she received her undergraduate degree summa cum laude in chemistry at Ouachita Baptist University followed by a master's degree from the University of Texas at Austin two years later. While in Austin she became a member of Iota Sigma Pi. In 1953, she received her Ph.D. in biochemistry from Cornell University in New York State. She taught at Cornell for 48 years starting as an associate professor in nutrition. Nell never married but always lived with her mother who moved with her to Ithaca where Ethel died in 1972.

In the winter of 1996 at the age of 75, Mondy was attacked by a teenager which left her partially deaf. Due to this incident she became active in victim's rights and elder safety that prompted bills in the New York Senate and Assembly. She championed changes to the support victims receive in terms of restitution, navigating bureaucracy, emotional support, and protection.

== Professional accomplishments ==
Mondy left a large body of writing and research behind her. Her work can be found in numerous publications describing a wide range of topics surrounding potatoes such as how the chemical content of potatoes is affected by amendments in soil or in how they are packaged. Her first book was Experimental Food Chemistry, published in 1980.

In 1960, Mondy was instrumental in setting up the first International Food Congress after receiving a NATO Award to go to Scotland and be a part of a seminar on the recent advances in Food Science. In the middle of that decade she worked as a consultant with the R.T. French company, (known today as French's). At Florida State University she worked as a professor of food and nutrition from 1960 to 1970. Under the US Government she worked for the USDA and from 1979 to 1980 she consulted for the Environmental Protection Agency.

In 2001, she published an autobiography, You Never Fail Until You Stop Trying: The Story of a Pioneer Women Chemist. The book focuses on Dr. Mondy's challenges being a woman in science and her work to improve worldwide food and nutrition, specifically in third world countries.

== Awards ==
- Elizabeth Fleming Stier Award
- Honorary Member of the Graduate Women in Science for her research in biochemistry
- Honorary Life Member of The Potato Association of America
- NATO Award
- In 1982 she was elected to be a fellow of the American Association for the Advancement of Science.
- In 1985 she was elected to be a fellow of the Institute of Food Technologists
