= Elizabeth Fleming Stier Award =

The Elizabeth Fleming Stier Award has been issued every year since 1997. It is awarded to a member of the Institute of Food Technologists (IFT) who has pursued humanitarian ideals and unselfish dedication to the well-being of the food industry, academia, students, or the general public. The award is named for Elizabeth Fleming Stier (1925-1995), a food science professor at Rutgers University in New Brunswick, New Jersey who became the first female award winner of IFT when she won the William V. Cruess Award in 1974.

Award winners receive a USD 3000 honorarium from the IFT New York Section and a plaque from IFT.

== Winners ==
Year	Winner(s)
1997	Nell I. Mondy
1998	Ruth M. Patrick
1999	Arnold E. Denton
2000	Joe M. Regenstein
2001	Paul Jelen
2002	Carol Cooper
2003	Alfred A. Bushway
2004	Barbara Rasco
2005	George J. Flick, Jr.
2006	Lynn G. Turner
2007	Susan Kay Hall McWatters
2008	Donald Kramer
2009	Rakesh K. Singh
2010	No award given
