= Oxman =

Oxman is a surname. Notable people with the surname include:

- Neri Oxman (born 1976), American–Israeli designer and professor of art and architecture
- Katja Oxman (born 1942), German-born American visual artist
- Rivka Oxman (born 1950), Israeli architect, researcher, and professor
- Stephen A. Oxman (born 1945), American government official
- Zachary Oxman (born 1968), American contemporary sculptor and artist
