= The Forgiveness Project =

- Founded: 2004
- Type: International organization
- Registration no.: Charity No. 1103922
- Purpose: Restorative justice; Conflict resolution; Forgiveness; Storytelling
- Location: London, UK
- Key people: Marina Cantacuzino (founder)
- Website: theforgivenessproject.com

The Forgiveness Project is a UK-based charity that provides opportunities and resources for people to explore the benefits and complexities of forgiveness. With no political or religious affiliations, The Forgiveness Project's independent and inclusive approach ensures its core message – that everyone has the potential to change their perspective and break the cycle of violence – resonates across all cultures.

== Aims ==
=== Raise awareness ===
Make the concept of forgiveness accessible to people around the world through real-life stories and a range of resources, including books, podcasts and videos.

=== Learn together ===
Provide opportunities for people to explore forgiveness through thought-provoking community events, including the Forgiveness Café, panel discussions, lectures and workshops.

=== Reduce reoffending ===
Support people who have harmed others in their journey towards desistance from crime through the charity's award-winning prison programme, RESTORE.

== History ==
=== 2004 - The F Word Exhibition ===
The charity was founded in 2004 by Marina Cantacuzino, a journalist who in the build up to the Iraq War began to gather personal stories from people whose lives had been affected by violence but who chose forgiveness instead of retaliation.

Cantacuzino spent all of 2003 collecting stories of reconciliation and forgiveness for an exhibition of words and images, which she created with photographer Brian Moody. These stories subsequently formed the basis of The Forgiveness Project's The F Word: Stories of Forgiveness exhibition. Funding for the exhibition came from the late Dame Anita Roddick (Founder of The Body Shop) who became the charity's founding patron together with the late Archbishop Desmond Tutu.

Since its launch in 2004 at the OXO Galley in London, UK, the exhibition has been displayed in more than 550 venues, across 14 countries, to an audience of over 70,000 people.

=== 2008 - The RESTORE Prison Programme ===
RESTORE is the Forgiveness Project's award-winning, intensive, group-based intervention programme that supports prisoners in their process of change towards desistance from crime. It encourages the sharing of experiences within a framework influenced by Restorative Justice principles. Co-facilitated by trained victims of crime and ex-offenders, the facilitators use their personal testimonies to encourage prisoners to take responsibility for their actions and change how they think and feel about their offending behaviour.

The project has delivered over 160 programmes in custodial and non-custodial settings in England and Wales since 2007, reaching 3,300 participants including 185 prison officers.

==== Link between RESTORE and restorative justice ====
Restorative Justice (RJ) traditionally focuses on healing harm by bringing a victim and an offender into communication, but this voluntary process can be halted at any stage if either party is not ready to be in contact with the other.

The Forgiveness Project's approach is to help offenders unravel their own stories and develop empathy by understanding the effect their actions have on others. This enables them to start the restorative process without being entirely dependent on their victim's willingness or availability to participate.

In many cases, having encouraged behavioural change, the programme may result in the offender having the confidence, motivation and support to meet their victims as part of future RJ conferencing. RESTORE assists in victims' recovery by enabling them to play a role in the criminal justice system.

== Restorative storytelling ==
Central to their work is the sharing of personal accounts about people's transformative journeys. Having collected over 130 personal stories on their website, this is also done through its exhibition, The F Word, and via the award-winning programmes it runs within prisons, schools, community groups and companies.

In providing tools that can facilitate conflict resolution and reconciliation, The Forgiveness Project encourages behavioural change and improves people's lives, whatever their story.

These story-led initiatives operate at a local, national and international level and encourage individuals to reflect on their current perspective and their future life path. Rather than give advice or tell people what to think, The Forgiveness Project works by inviting those involved to see whether they can relate to the stories they hear and to take steps in trying to see a different perspective on their circumstances.

== Themes ==
Stories collected by The Forgiveness Project follow multiple themes that the Project states "provide a framework to these forgiveness stories, adding a dimension to the narrative of hate, hurt, and healing." These themes are feeling pain and anger, being curious, forgiving yourself, developing empathy, seeking revenge, transforming hate, and making meaning. The Forgiveness Project believes that analyzing the themes "shows that while forgiveness is not a linear process, and seldom a one-off event, nevertheless certain qualities and values feature in most of the stories."

- feeling pain and anger
- being curious
- forgiving yourself
- developing empathy
- seeking revenge
- transforming hate
- making meaning

== Projects and programmes ==
=== The F Word exhibition ===
This collection of thought-provoking narratives document personal tales of forgiveness and reconciliation around the world. The exhibition can be hired in a range of formats and regularly tours Germany, the UK and the USA. There are also permanent exhibitions in France, Kenya, South Africa and Sweden.

The F Word exhibition has been displayed in more than 500 venues across 13 countries to an audience of over 60,000 people since being launched in London's Oxo Gallery in January 2004. The exhibition was described by the charity's founding patron, Anita Roddick, as “truly an education of the human spirit”.

The Exhibition is made up of Storytellers, who engage others and share their traumas in order to help others heal.

=== The Forgiveness Project: Stories for a Vengeful Age (book) ===
An updated collection of some of the charity's stories which examine the charity's core themes of forgiveness, reconciliation and conflict transformation have been brought together into an illustrated 240-page book. Released in hardback by Jessica Kingsley Publishers on 26 March 2015, the book was written by founder Marina Cantacuzino and includes forewords from patron Desmond Tutu and Alexander McCall Smith. It has also received endorsements from actress Emma Thompson, journalist and news presenter Jon Snow, historian and TV presenter Dan Snow, cultural thinker and founding faculty member of The School of Life in London, Roman Krznaric, Cambridge University professor Simon Baron-Cohen, humanitarian and former hostage Terry Waite and journalist Bel Mooney.

=== Speaker's Bureau ===
The charity believes that hearing someone speak first-hand and being able to ask questions is the most powerful form of story-telling so over 30 of those who share their stories with The Forgiveness Project are also part of the charity's Speaker's Bureau. This facility allows schools, prisons, conferences and organisations hiring the F Word exhibition to have one of the featured storytellers on hand to share their experience of forgiveness.

=== Annual lecture ===
In addition to regular talks, The Forgiveness Project has also hosted five annual lectures to date.

- 2010: The first annual lecture was delivered by Desmond Tutu in May 2010 at St John's, Smith Square. Tutu was joined by Mary Blewitt who lost 50 members of her family in the Rwandan genocide; Jo Berry whose father was killed in the 1984 Brighton hotel bombing; and Patrick Magee, the former IRA activist who planted the bomb. The event was chaired by BBC broadcaster Edward Stourton.
- 2011: Clare Short delivered the second annual lecture on 'No Forgiveness Without Justice' on 6 October 2011 at Union Chapel, Islington. Chaired by Yasmin Alibhai-Brown of The Independent, Clare Short's lecture was preceded by Colin Parry, who lost his son in the IRA Warrington bomb in 1993, Elizabeth Turner, whose husband was killed while at a business meeting in the World Trade Centre on 11 September 2001, and Bassam Aramin, a Palestinian whose 10-year-old daughter, Abir Aramin, was killed by an Israeli soldier and who is a founding member of Combatants for Peace.
- 2012: Dr Gwen Adshead, forensic psychiatrist at Broadmoor High Security Hospital, who delivered the 2012 lecture at the Royal Geographical Society, supported on stage by Marian Partington whose sister was murdered by Fred and Rosemary West, Erwin James, the Guardian columnist and former prisoner who has served a life sentence for murder; and Kemal Pervanic, survivor of the notorious Ormaska concentration camp in Bosnia.
- 2013: Professor Simon Baron-Cohen delivered the keynote speech on 'Zero degrees of empathy: exploring explanations of human cruelty and kindness' at the Royal Geographical Society. The lecture, chaired by Simon Fanshawe, was followed by a panel discussion with Marina Cantacuzino, Mary Foley, whose 15-year-old daughter Charlotte was murdered during a birthday party in East London in 2005, and Peter Woolf, a reformed career criminal.
- 2017: 7th Annual lecture delivered by Richard Holloway October 11, 2017 at The Royal Geographical Society, chaired by Shani Chakrabarti. The Lecture "The Politics of Forgiveness" was about the complexity of Forgiveness.

== Recognition ==
=== Awards and commendations ===
The organization has won recognition such as:

- Longford Prize: In 2007, the charity received a 'Special Commendation' from the Longford Prize judges, awarded for its 'remarkable work' in exploring and encouraging notions of forgiveness through grassroots projects, including in prisons.
- Robin Corbett Award: In February 2014, the charity was highly commended by the Robin Corbett Award for Prisoner Rehabilitation 2014 for its involvement of trained former offenders, victims of crime and prison staff in the delivery of its group-based RESTORE programme. The runner-up prize of £1,000 was presented by Lady Corbett and Lord Ramsbotham at the House of Lords in Westminster.

Cantacuzino received a 2013 Winston Churchill Memorial Trust Travelling Fellowship which enabled her to spend five weeks visiting and learning from other restorative justice programmes in custodial and community settings in the US and Canada.

=== Research and evaluation ===
Independent evaluation was commissioned on the work of RESTORE within prisons and the effect that it has had on young offenders and adult prisoners who had participated in the programme.

- 2009: In 2009, Lois Edmund, Ph.D., C.Psych., Associate Professor of Conflict Resolution Studies, University of Winnipeg, conducted a qualitative assessment based on the first 18 months of The Forgiveness Project's operations in prison. The report concluded that RESTORE 'results in dramatic insight for many participants', but 'further work is needed to evaluate the long-term learnings of the participants'.
- 2012: To back up The Forgiveness Project's assertion that its work consistently demonstrates a shift in offenders' motivation to change the charity commissioned an independent evaluation of RESTORE from the Forensic Psychological Services at Middlesex University. The evaluation concluded that the intervention reduces recidivism and that those who completed the programme had improved general attitudes to offending, were less likely to anticipate re-offending, and less likely to evaluate crime as worthwhile.
- 2013: The Forgiveness Project carried out extensive work at Ashfield Young Offenders Institute in Bristol where, with funding from the Home Office's Communities Against Gangs, Guns and Knives Fund, it was able to embed its RESTORE work into the fabric of the prison. In a report of this programme by cultural scientist Christian Straub, a member of the prison staff described RESTORE as “very powerful” because it “delivered a strong message gently”.

=== Patrons and supporters ===
Since Dame Anita Roddick first lent her support in advance of the inaugural The F Word exhibition in 2004, The Forgiveness Project has attracted endorsements and ongoing support from a number of high-profile organisations and individuals.

The charity's patrons include Archbishop Desmond Tutu, Rt Hon the Lord Woolf, philanthropist Lady Edwina Grosvenor, actress Emma Thompson and comedian Shappi Khorsandi whilst supporters include Tony Benn, clothes designer Katharine Hamnett, actors Dame Helen Mirren and Linus Roache plus Terry Waite.

The Forgiveness Project is also a peace partner of the Charter for Compassion.
