= Charles Mantell =

British barrister (1937–2010)

Sir Charles Barrie Knight Mantell, PC (30 January 1937 — 1 May 2010) was a British barrister who served as a High Court judge and a Lord Justice of Appeal. He is notable for presiding at the trial of Rosemary West.

Mantell was born in Romiley, then part of Cheshire, the second son of Francis Christopher Knight Mantell and Elsie, née Caton. His younger brother was actor, Knight Mantell. He attended Manchester Grammar School and studied law at the University of Manchester. He married (Anne) Shirley Cogger in 1960. After National Service as an education officer in the Royal Air Force between 1958 and 1961 (reaching the rank of flying officer), he was called to the bar by Gray's Inn and later served at the chambers of Sir Patrick Russell in Manchester. He practised on the Northern Circuit and was present at the trials of the Birmingham Six, Trevor Hardy and Terry Clark.

Between 1982 and 1985 Mantell was a Supreme Court judge in Hong Kong, returning to Britain as a judge on the Western Circuit. In 1990 he was appointed to the High Court and knighted. He was promoted to the Court of Appeal in 1997 and was sworn of the Privy Council. Retiring in 2004, he was a Surveillance Commissioner from 2006 until his death.
