= Wilhelm Stier =

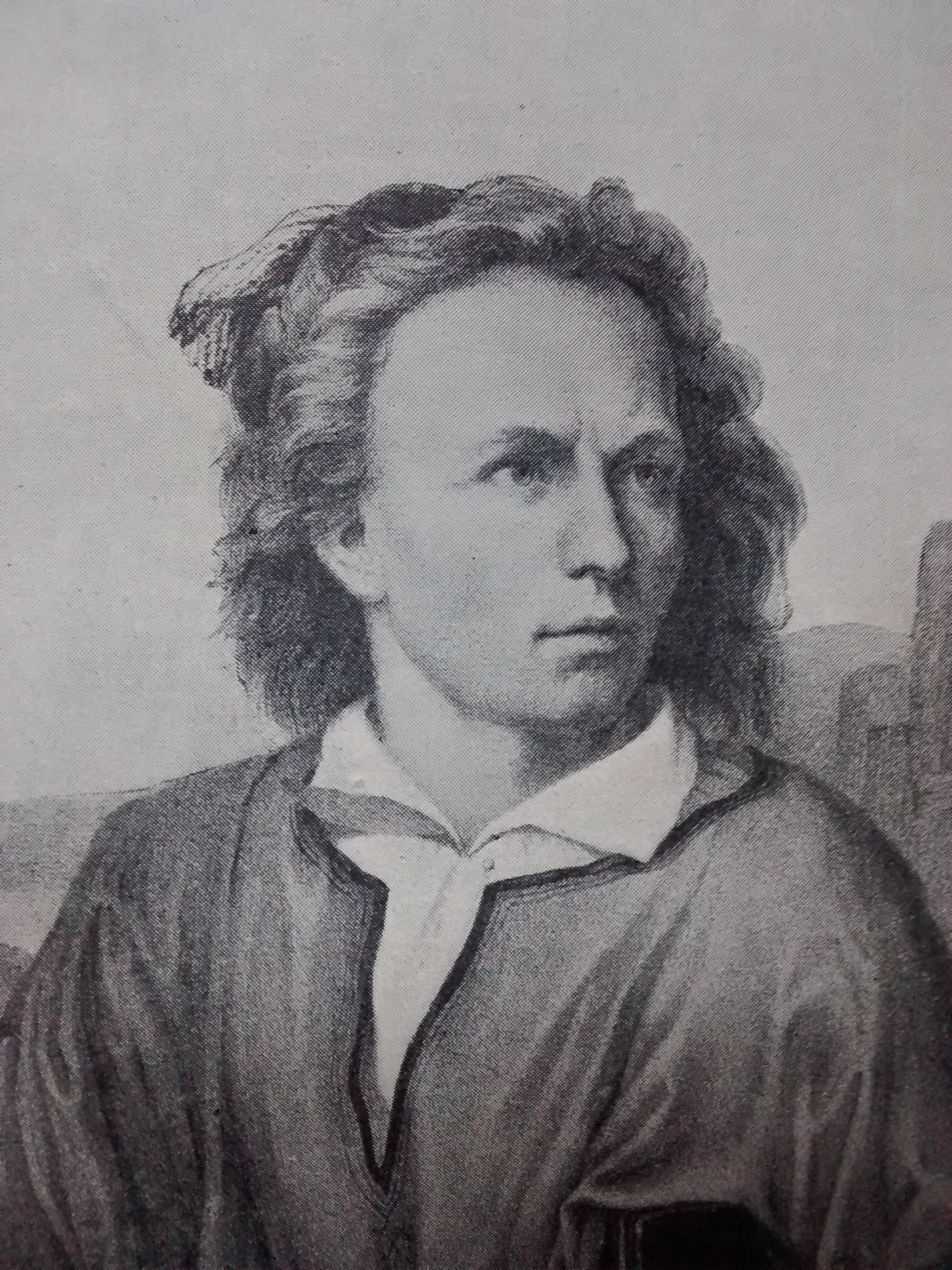
Wilhelm Stier, by Ney (around 1825)

Wilhelm Stier (born 8 May 1799 in Błonie near Warsaw, died 19 September 1856 in Schöneberg, full name: Friedrich Ludwig Wilhelm Stier) was a German architect and university teacher at the Berlin Bauakademie.

== Life and career ==
Wilhelm Stier was born the son of a German warrant officer in the then Prussian province of South Prussia. When this was dissolved in 1807, Wilhelm's family moved to Silesia. From 1812 on Wilhelm lived with relatives in Berlin and attended high school at the Gray Monastery. Wilhelm studied at the Bauakademie in Berlin, one of his teachers was Salomo Sachs, with whom he was friends all his life. In 1817 he passed his first examination.

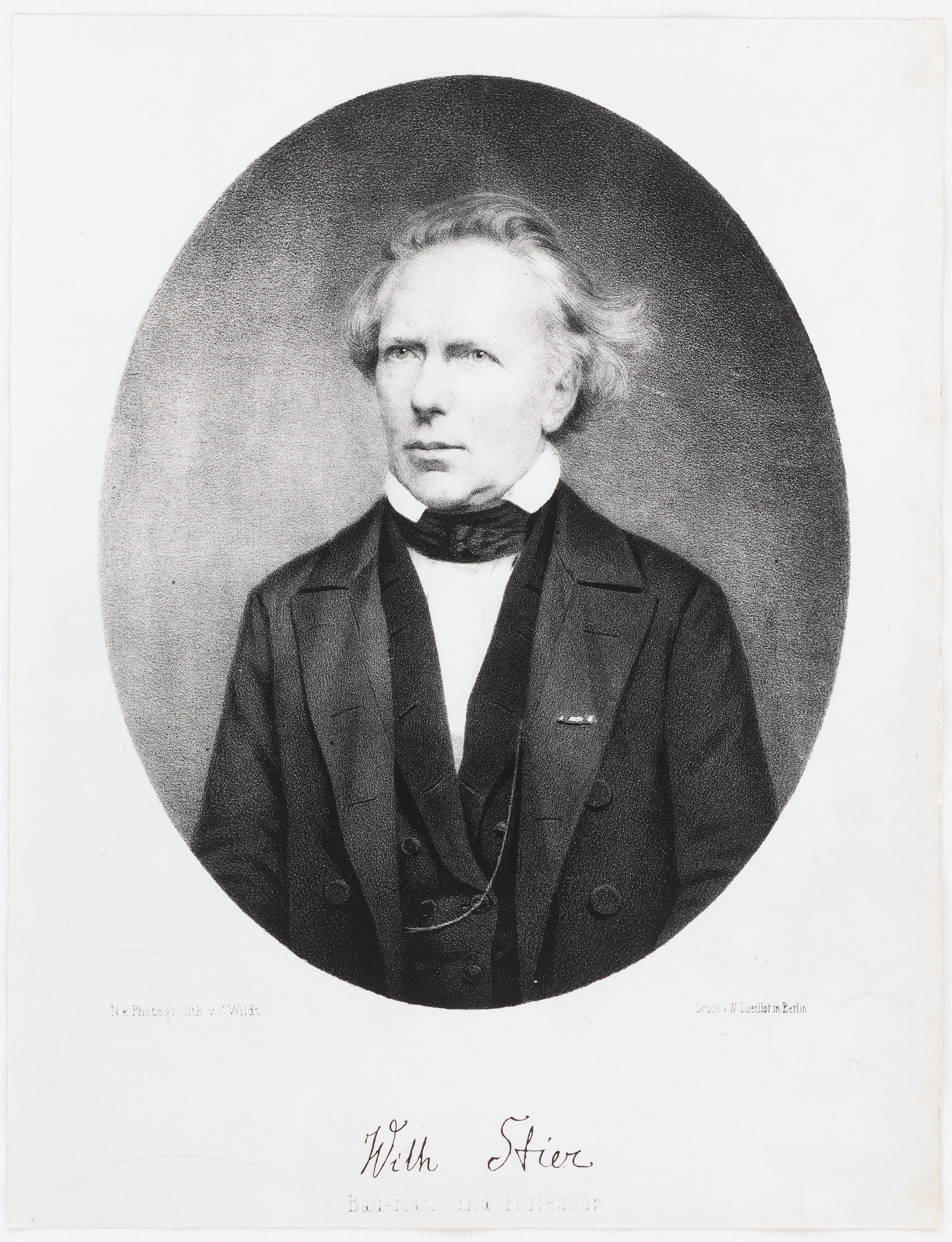
Professor and Baurat Wilhelm Stier, 1850

After four years of compulsory further education in the Rhineland, Wilhelm did not sit for the second exam. Instead he set off on foot via France to Italy where he joined a circle of German artists in Rome, became friends with Schnorr von Carolsfeld and accompanied Hittorff in the study of Greek antiquities in southern Italy. He also participated in publications by the Prussian envoy Bunsen on the history of Rome.

In October 1824 Wilhelm Stier got to know Schinkel on the latter's second trip to Italy. Schinkel felt Stier's artistic talent, wanted to win him over as a teacher for the Bauakademie, and arranged for him a Prussian state scholarship, which enabled Stier to continue his studies of ancient architecture for another two years.

After five years in Italy, Stier started to teach design and later art history at the Bauakademie around Easter 1828, although he had passed only one very junior exam. After some pressure, he took a simplified second exam and as a result received the title of professor. From 1841 he was a member of the Prussian Academy of Arts. In 1842 he became a member of the Academy of Sciences in Berlin and 1853 in Munich. In 1847 Stier, who was a charismatic teacher, became the center of a circle of student admirers which exists to this day and cultivates Stier's memory.

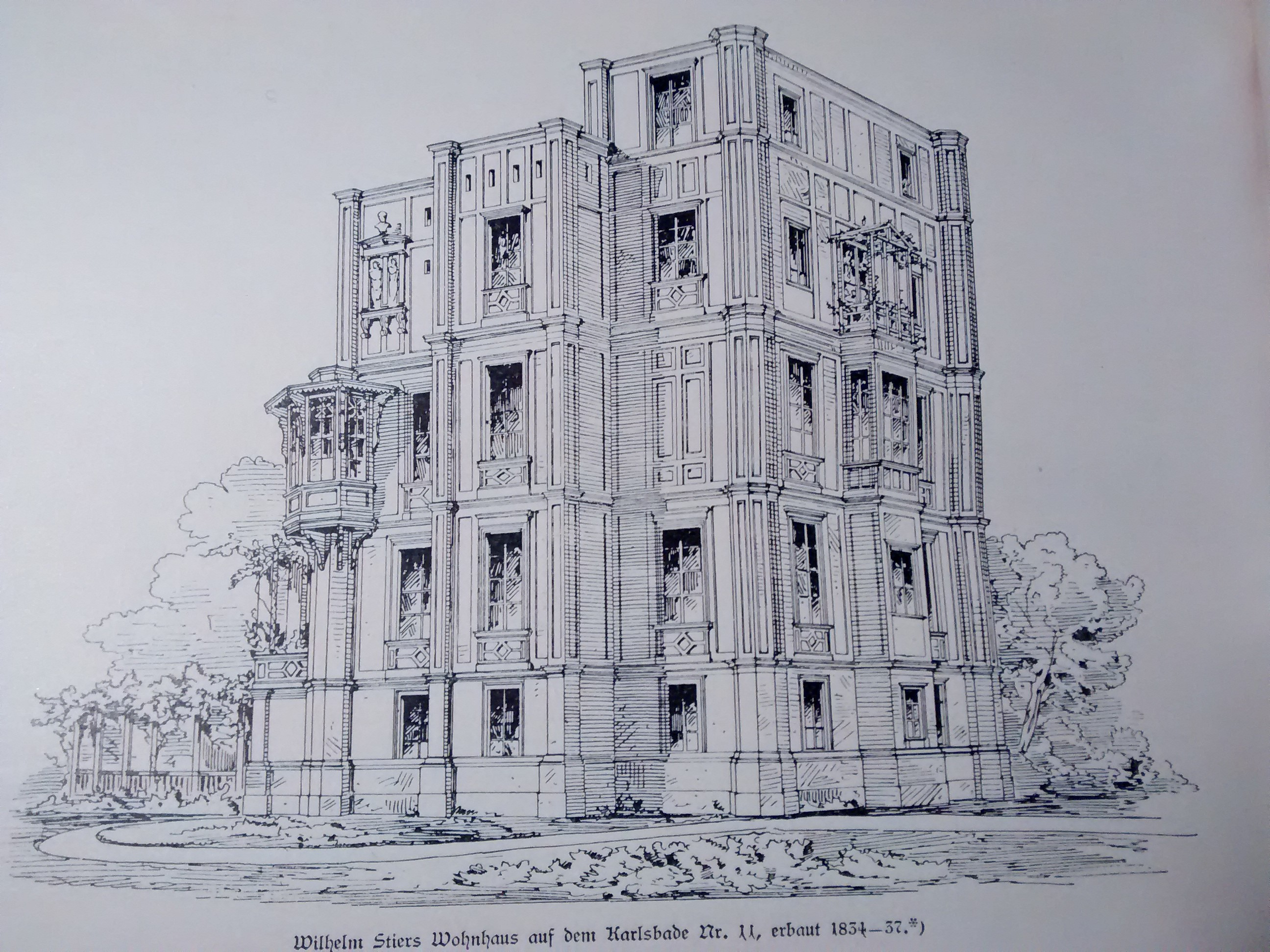
"Stierburg", private residence of Wilhelm Stier

Stier created numerous study and teaching designs, inter alia for the Berlin Cathedral. He rejected the imitation of historical styles. He lived since 1837 in the popularly called "Stierburg" house, the only house he actually ever built. On 18 January 1851 he was awarded the Red Eagle Order.

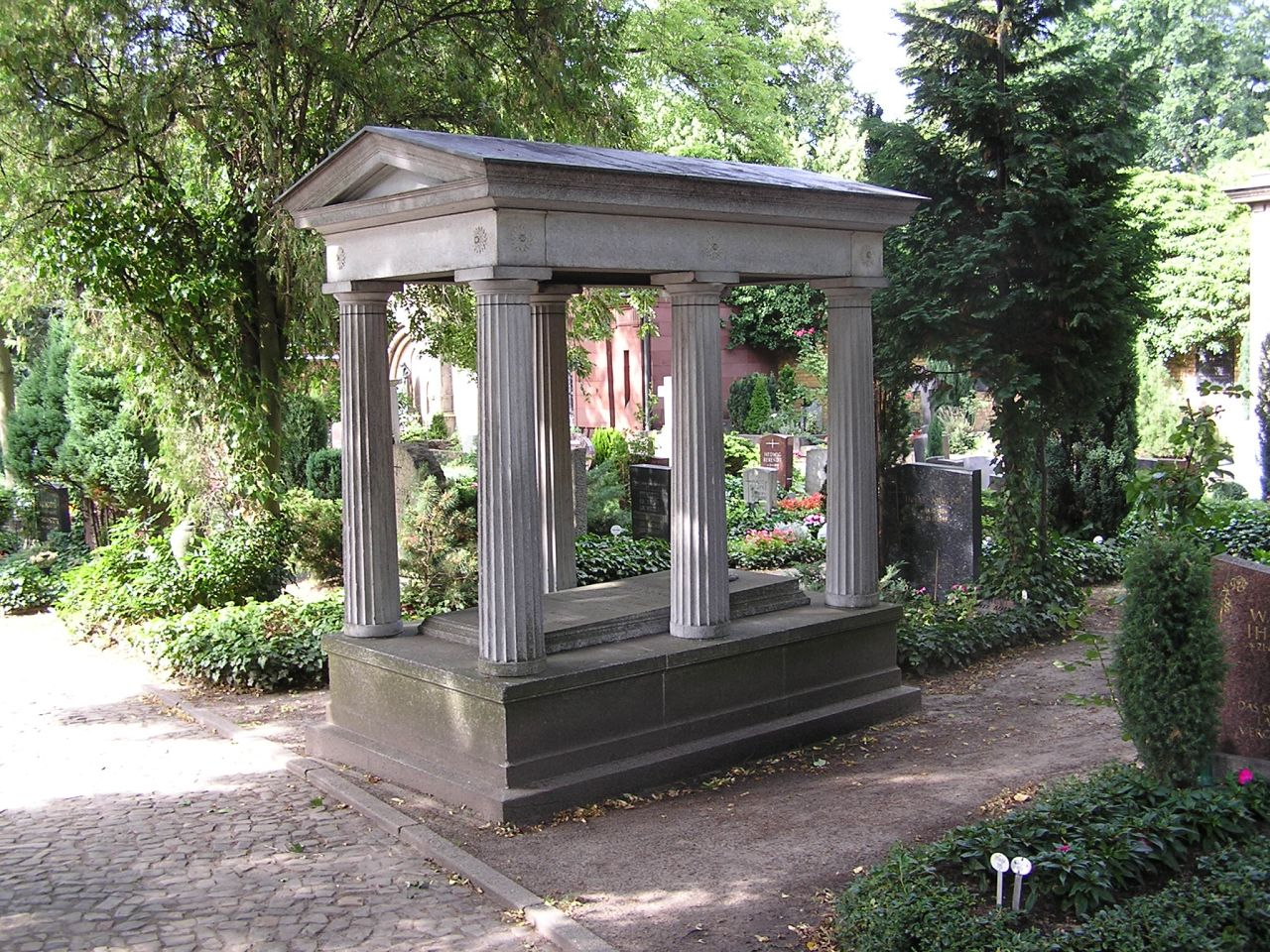
Monument for Wilhelm Stier

His grave monument created by Friedrich August Stüler carries the inscription "To the friend, to the teacher - by the architects of Germany".

== Family ==
Wilhelm Stier had a brother called Theodor Stier whom he helped raise after their father's death. Wilhelm was the father of the architect Professor Hubert Stier (1838 - 1907), grandfather to landscape architect Rudolf Stier (1890 - 1966), Director of Parks & Gardens in Kassel, Germany and Vienna, Austria, and great grandfather of architect and urban planner Professor Hubert Hoffmann (1904 - 1999), professor at the Technical University of Graz in Austria. Cousin to Professor of architecture Gustav Stier.

== Literature ==
- Hubert Stier (Hrsg.): Architektonische Erfindungen von Wilhelm Stier. Berlin 1867.
- Wilhelm Stier: Hesperische Blätter – nachgelassene Schriften, Ernst & Korn, Berlin 1857, at Google Books .
