= Hubert Oswald Stier =

German architect

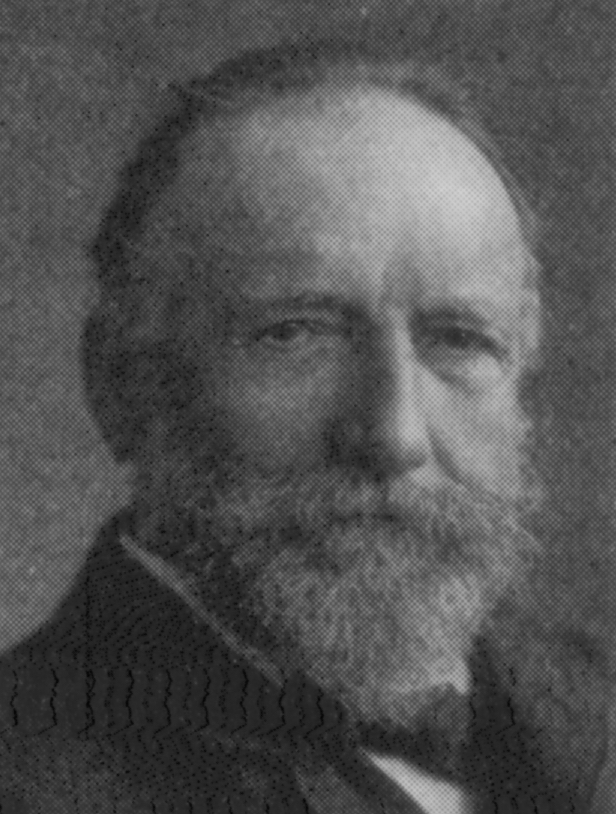
- Born: March 27, 1838; Berlin, Kingdom of Prussia
- Died: June 25, 1907 (aged 69); Hannover, German Empire
- Occupations: Architect; University Lecturer
- Father: Wilhelm Stier

Hubert Oswald Stier (27 March 1838 in Berlin – 25 June 1907 in Hannover) was a German architect and university lecturer. He built mainly train stations, museums, and churches primarily in the Neo-Renaissance style. Most of his works are located in Berlin and Hanover.

== Biography ==
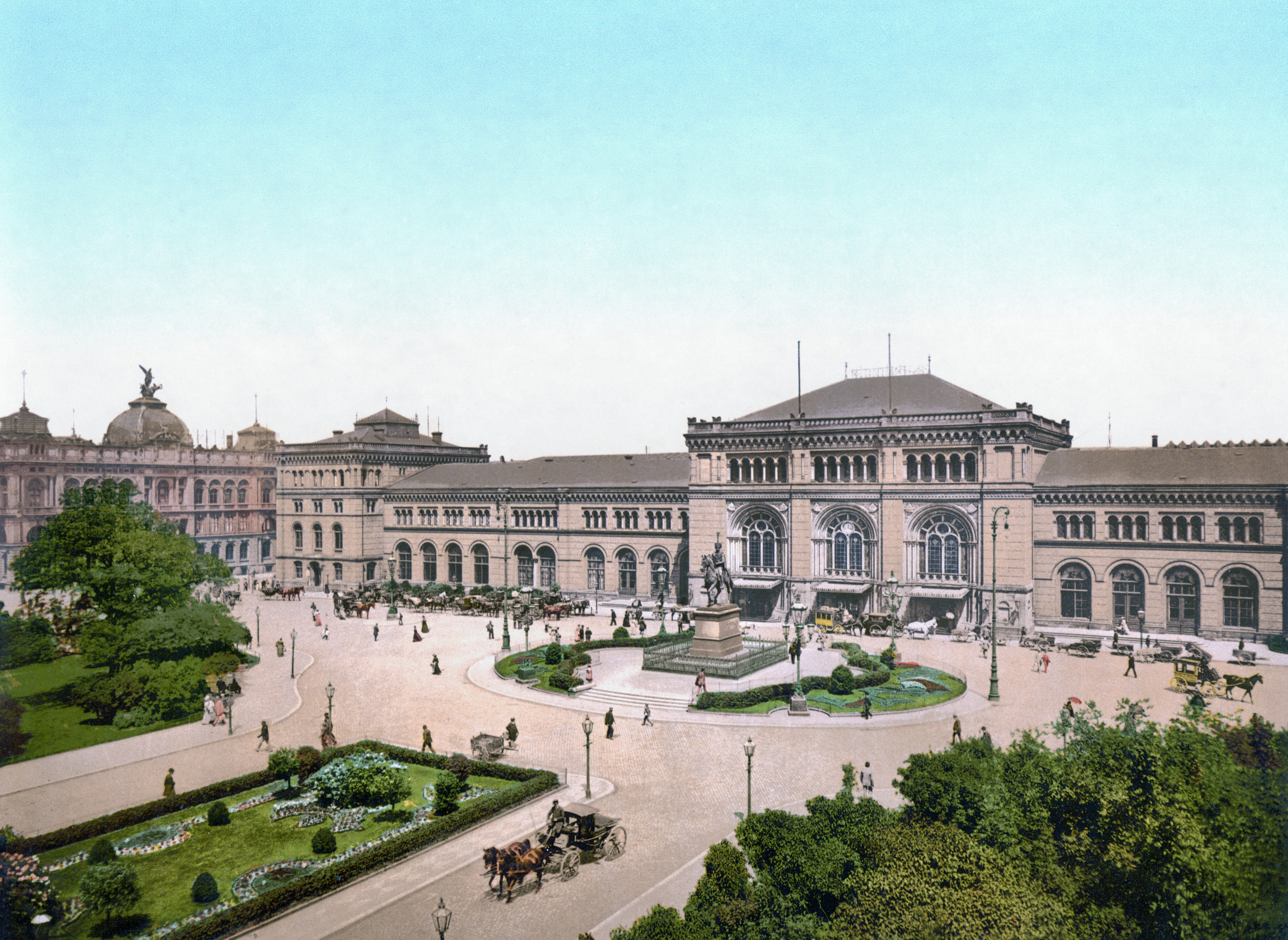
Hauptbahnhof Hannover (1900)

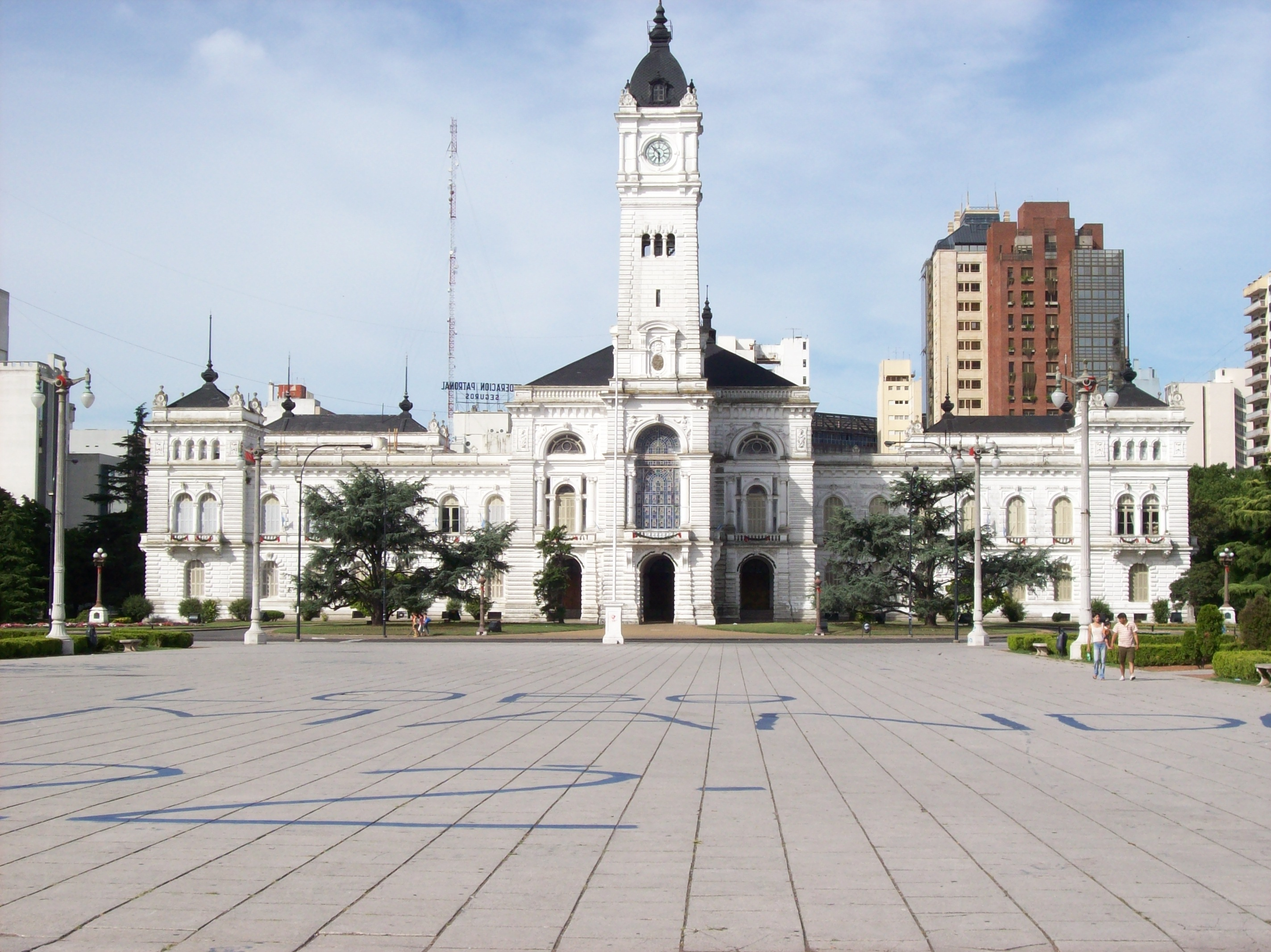
Palacio Municipal (Rathaus) in La Plata, Argentina

Hubert Stier was the son of the Berlin architect Wilhelm Stier (1799–1856). After studying in Berlin, he received professional training in his father's company, and in 1862 he undertook a study trip to Italy.

Between 1863 and 1864 he participated in the construction of the Red Town Hall in Berlin-Mitte. In 1868 he was appointed chief architect in Berlin. From 1876 he worked as a departmental architect of Hannover railways, where he was appointed as head of the project to build a new central station. Stier's project combined Berlin and Hanover arc styles, along with original his own ideas.

In 1880 Stier took over as professor at the Technical University of Hannover, and in 1883 as professor. In 1899 he was appointed construction advisor. In 1895 Hubert Stier also won the competition for the New Town Hall in Hanover, which eventually failed to run according to its design. Apart from commercial buildings in Hannover, he acted as the person in charge of numerous constructions of numerous other buildings including churches, post offices, and monuments.

== Writings ==
- Architectural inventions by Wilhelm Stier. Edited by Hubert Stier. Berlin 1867.
- The Liebfrauenkirche in Arnstadt. Study of the structural development of the same. Frotscher, Arnstadt 1882. (Reprint: Thüringer Chronik-Verlag, Arnstadt 2001.)
- From my sketchbook. Architectural travel studies from France. Wittwer, Stuttgart 1885-1889.
- Romance studies. Based on own explanations and recordings as well as designs by the students of the Technical University in Hanover. Edited by Hubert Stier. Seemann, Leipzig 1895.
