= Fred West =

English serial killer and sex offender (1941–1995)

- Fred and Rose West in the mid-1980s
- Born: Frederick Walter Stephen West; 29 September 1941; Much Marcle, Herefordshire, England
- Died: 1 January 1995 (aged 53); HM Prison Birmingham, England
- Spouses: Catherine Costello (m. 1962; murdered 1971) Rosemary Letts (m. 1972)
- Status: Deceased
- Convictions: Earlier convictions for: Actual bodily harm; Child molestation; Deception; Indecent assault; Possession of stolen goods; Theft; Unpaid fines
- Penalty: Died by suicide prior to murder trial

Details
- Victims: 12–13+
- Span of crimes: 1967–1987
- Country: United Kingdom
- Date apprehended: 24 February 1994; 32 years ago

Frederick Walter Stephen West (29 September 1941 – 1 January 1995) was an English serial killer, serial rapist and child molester, who committed at least twelve murders between 1967 and 1987 in Gloucestershire, England—the majority with his second wife, Rose West.

The victims were girls and young women. At least eight of the murders involved the Wests' sexual gratification and included rape, bondage, torture, and mutilation. The victims' dismembered bodies were typically buried in the cellar or garden of the West residence in Gloucester, which became known as the "House of Horrors". Fred is known to have committed at least two murders on his own; Rose is known to have murdered Fred's stepdaughter, Charmaine. The couple were arrested and charged in 1994.

Fred fatally asphyxiated himself while detained on remand at HM Prison Birmingham on 1 January 1995, at which time he and Rose were jointly charged with nine murders, and he with three further murders. In November 1995, Rose was convicted of ten murders and sentenced to ten life terms with a subsequent whole life order.

== Early life ==
=== Childhood ===
Frederick Walter Stephen West was born on 29 September 1941, at Bickerton Cottage, Much Marcle, Herefordshire, the first surviving child of Walter Stephen West (1914–1992) and Daisy Hannah Hill (1922–1968). Fred was from a poor family of farm workers, close-knit and mutually protective. His father was a disciplinarian and his mother overprotective.

Moorcourt Farm, Much Marcle, where West lived, in Moorcourt Cottage, 1946–1961

In 1946, the family moved to Moorcourt Cottage, a semi-detached building adjacent to Moorcourt Farm, on the outskirts of Much Marcle, where Fred's father worked as a milking herdsman and harvest hand. The cottage had no electricity and was heated by a log fire. By 1951, Fred's mother had given birth to eight children, six of whom survived. Fred was always his mother's favourite. He was seen as a mother's boy and relied mostly on his siblings for companionship.

The West children were all expected to perform assigned chores and seasonal work; the three girls picked hops and strawberries, and the three boys harvested wheat and hunted rabbits. The necessity of working to earn a living and to survive instilled a strong work ethic in Fred, who also developed a lifelong habit of petty theft.

Classmates later recalled Fred as being scruffy, dim, lethargic, and regularly in trouble. Although barely numerate and displaying the literacy level of a seven-year-old, he displayed an aptitude for woodwork and artwork. He left school with no qualifications in December 1956 at the age of 15, initially working alongside his father as a labourer both at Moorcourt Farm and a neighbouring farm.

Fred later claimed that he had been sexually abused by his mother at age 12, that he had engaged in acts of bestiality in his early teens, and that his belief that incest was normal stemmed from his father's incest with Fred's sisters. Fred's youngest brother, Douglas, dismissed these claims as fantasy.

=== Adolescence ===
By 1957, Fred and his brother John frequently socialised at a youth club in nearby Ledbury, where his distinct and guttural Herefordshire accent marked him as a "country bumpkin". He aggressively pestered women and girls, whom he objectified as sources of pleasure to be used as he saw fit, and would abruptly approach and fondle them. When a girl accepted his advances, she would find his sexual performance unsatisfying, as his primary objective was his own gratification.

At age 17, Fred suffered a fractured skull, a broken arm, and a broken leg in a motorcycle accident. He was unconscious for seven days and walked with braces for several months. Because of this incident, he developed an extreme fear of hospitals and became prone to fits of rage. Two years later, Fred suffered a further head injury when a girl he groped on a fire escape outside the Ledbury Youth Club punched him, sending him falling two floors.

In June 1961, Fred's 13-year-old sister, Kitty, told her mother that Fred had been raping her since the previous December, and had impregnated her. Fred was arrested, and freely admitted to police he had been molesting young girls since his early teens and asked, "Doesn't everybody do it?" He was tried on 9 November at Herefordshire Assizes. Although disgusted by her son's actions, Fred's mother had been prepared to testify in his defence. Immediately prior to her scheduled testimony, Kitty changed her mind and refused to testify, and the case collapsed. Much of Fred's family effectively disowned him, his mother banished him from the household, and he moved in with his aunt Violet and uncle Ernie at Daisy Cottage in Much Marcle. By mid-1962, Fred had reconciled with his parents, but not with most of his family.

== Catherine "Rena" Costello ==
=== Marriage ===
Fred became re-acquainted with Catherine (Rena) Bernadette Costello in September 1962, when he was 21. He had first met Costello, who came from Coatbridge, Lanarkshire, at a Much Marcle dance hall in 1960, and dated her for several months before she returned to Scotland. Costello was pregnant by a Pakistani bus driver at the time of her marriage to Fred, and may have relocated from Glasgow to England due to members of her family expressing their displeasure at her being pregnant with a mixed-race child. She married Fred in Ledbury on 17 November, the sole guest being Fred's younger brother John. The couple initially lived in Fred's aunt's home, then moved to Coatbridge, where Fred worked as an ice cream van driver. Rena's daughter, Charmaine, was born on 22 March 1963; to explain the child's mixed ancestry, Rena and Fred claimed that she had suffered a miscarriage and that Charmaine was adopted. Shortly thereafter, the couple relocated to Savoy Street, in the Bridgeton district of Glasgow.

In July 1964, Rena and Fred had a daughter, Anna Marie. The child was born at the couple's Savoy Street home. The family nanny, Isa McNeill, and neighbours of the Wests, recall Rena as a considerate mother "struggling to bring up two children." Fred treated the children harshly. He kept the girls in the bottom of a bunk bed with bars fitted to the space between the bunks, effectively caging them. They were allowed out only when he was at work.

Via McNeill, the Wests became acquainted with her friend, 16-year-old Anne McFall, who was despondent over the death of her boyfriend in a workplace accident. McFall spent a great deal of time at the Wests' flat.

Any ordinary man would have given the child some ice cream, but instead he smashed her round the head with his hand ... He was a violent and sadistic bastard who enjoyed beating up women and kids.

— John McLachlan (1995)

Fred later admitted to having engaged in numerous affairs in the early years of his marriage, fathering one illegitimate child with a woman from the Gorbals. When Rena discovered her husband's infidelity, she began an affair with a man named John McLachlan. On one occasion, Fred discovered the pair in an embrace. He punched Rena, making her scream. In response, McLachlan punched Fred, who drew a knife and grazed McLachlan's abdomen. When punched by McLachlan a second time, Fred stopped defending himself. Years later, McLachlan recollected this incident: "He couldn't tackle a man, but he wasn't so slow in attacking women." He and Rena continued their affair, and McLachlan became increasingly aghast at Rena's bruises and black eyes. On each occasion it became apparent Fred had beaten his wife, McLachlan extensively beat Fred. In another instance, McLachlan witnessed Charmaine—little older than a toddler—ask Fred for an ice cream from his van; in response, Fred struck her across the head, prompting another beating from McLachlan.

On 4 November 1965, Fred accidentally ran over and killed a small boy in Glasgow with his van. He was cleared of any wrongdoing by police, but feared the hostile reaction and potential reprisals for the accident from the locals, upon whom he relied to make his living. In December, he returned to Gloucester with Charmaine and Anna Marie, renting a caravan at the Timberland Caravan Park in Bishop's Cleeve. Rena joined him in February 1966, accompanied by McNeill and McFall, who also moved into Fred's caravan. (McNeill and McFall both came from impoverished backgrounds; both hoped to find work in England.) Shortly after the move south, Fred found employment driving a lorry for a local abattoir.

By early 1966, Fred had begun to exhibit dominance and control over all three women. He was also prone to violent mood swings, with Rena and McNeill typically bearing the brunt of his fury. Fred also physically attacked his stepdaughter more than once. He is also reported to have begun sexually abusing Charmaine, and to have encouraged Rena to turn to prostitution to supplement his meagre income.

To escape Fred's domestic abuse and increasingly sadistic sexual demands, Rena phoned McLachlan, begging him to rescue her, McNeill and her children. Together, McLachlan, Rena, and McNeill devised a plan; he and McNeill's boyfriend, John Trotter, would secretly drive from Glasgow to Bishop's Cleeve in McLachlan's Mini and discreetly take Rena, her children and McNeill back to Scotland. McFall—whose family background had inured her to domestic violence—had by this stage become infatuated with Fred, who had promised to marry her. It is likely she informed Fred of the plan, as he arrived at the meeting time, and McFall was "oddly calm" as she informed McNeill she intended to remain with Fred to work as the children's nanny. An altercation ensued between Fred and McLachlan, resulting in Fred being struck several times as he clutched onto Charmaine and Anna Marie. Police were called and McLachlan, Trotter, McNeill, and Rena left, with Fred threatening to kill Rena should he ever see her again.

To ensure her daughters' well-being, Rena frequently travelled to England to visit Charmaine and Anna Marie while they lived with Fred at Bishop's Cleeve. Despite initially maintaining her friendship with McFall, Rena soon began to resent her matriarchal presence around her daughters. On 11 October, in an act of resentment, Rena stole some belongings from Fred's caravan and returned to Glasgow. She was arrested the following month and returned to Gloucester to face trial. On 29 November, Rena was sentenced to three years' probation. Fred testified at the hearing, admitting he and McFall were living together, but falsely claiming McFall intended to return to Scotland imminently.

After the trial, McFall moved into a caravan at the Timberland Caravan Park, and Rena alternated between living with Fred and returning to Glasgow. Letters McFall posted to her family and McNeill in Glasgow between 1966 and 1967 indicate she believed a relationship with Fred could offer her a better life than that she had experienced in Scotland, and she tried to persuade Fred to divorce his wife and marry her.

=== Murder of Anne McFall ===
In July 1967, McFall, aged 18 and eight months pregnant with Fred's child, vanished. She was never reported missing, but her dismembered remains were found buried at the edge of a cornfield between Much Marcle and Kempley in June 1994. Her limbs had been carefully disarticulated, and many phalanges were missing from her body—likely to have been retained as keepsakes. Her unborn child may also have been cut from her womb. Fred initially denied he had killed McFall, but confided to one visitor following his arrest that he had stabbed her to death following an argument. This explanation is inconsistent with the fact that her wrists were found with sections of dressing gown cord wrapped around them, suggesting she had been restrained prior to her murder.

The following month, Rena returned to live with Fred, and the couple relocated to the Lake House Caravan Park. Their relationship initially improved, but Rena left the following year, again leaving the children in his care. On these occasions when Fred had no one to supervise and care for the girls, he temporarily placed them in the care of Gloucestershire social services.

== Rosemary Letts ==
Fred first encountered Rosemary Letts in early 1969, shortly after her 15th birthday. The pair first met while waiting for the same bus in Cheltenham. Initially, Rose was repulsed by the then-27-year-old Fred's unkempt appearance and deduced he was a tramp, but she quickly became flattered by the attention Fred continued to lavish on her over the following days as he invariably sat alongside her at the same bus stop. Rose twice refused to go on a date with Fred, but allowed him to accompany her home. In their initial conversations, Fred quickly discovered that although Rose had never had a boyfriend, she was overtly promiscuous. He also extracted a degree of sympathy from her by claiming he and his two daughters had been abandoned by his wife, and that he wished for more children.

Having discovered Rose worked in a nearby bread shop, a few days after their first encounter, Fred persuaded an unknown woman to enter the premises and present Rose with a gift accompanied by the explanation that "a man outside" had asked her to present this gift to her. Minutes later, Fred entered the premises and asked Rose to accompany him on a date that evening; she accepted the offer. Shortly thereafter, Rose began a relationship with Fred, becoming a frequent visitor at the Lake House Caravan Park and a willing childminder to Charmaine and Anna Marie, who she noted were neglected and whom she initially treated with care and affection. On several occasions in the early days of their courtship, Rose insisted she and Fred take the girls on excursions to gather wildflowers.

Within weeks of her first meeting Fred, Rose left her job at the bread shop in order to become the nanny to Charmaine and Anna Marie. This decision was made with the agreement that Fred would provide her with sufficient money to give to her parents on Fridays to convince them she was still earning a salary at the bread shop. Several months later, Rose introduced Fred to her family, who were aghast at their daughter's choice of partner. Rose's mother, Daisy Letts, was unimpressed with Fred's braggadocio, and correctly concluded he was a pathological liar; her father, Bill Letts—a diagnosed schizophrenic who is believed to have molested his daughter—vehemently disapproved of the relationship, threatening Fred directly and promising to call social services if he continued to date Rose.

=== Relationship ===
Rose's parents forbade their daughter from continuing to date Fred, but she defied their wishes, prompting them to visit Gloucestershire social services to explain that their 15-year-old daughter was dating an older man, and that they had heard rumours that she had begun to engage in prostitution at his caravan. In response, Rose was placed in a home for troubled teenagers in Cheltenham in August 1969, and only allowed to leave under controlled conditions. When allowed to return home to visit her parents at weekends, Rose almost invariably took the opportunity to visit Fred.

On her 16th birthday, Rose left the home for troubled teenagers to return to her parents (Fred at the time serving a 30-day sentence for theft and unpaid fines). Upon Fred's release, Rose left her parents' home to move into the Cheltenham flat Fred then lived in. Shortly thereafter, Fred collected Charmaine and Anna Marie from social services. Bill Letts made one final effort to prevent his daughter from seeing Fred, and Rose was examined by a police surgeon in February 1970, who confirmed she was pregnant. In response, Rose was again placed into care, but was discharged on 6 March with the understanding she would terminate her pregnancy and return to her family. Instead, Rose opted to live with Fred, resulting in her father forbidding his daughter from ever again setting foot in his household.

Three months later, the couple vacated the Cheltenham flat and relocated to the ground floor flat of a two-storey house in Midland Road, Gloucester. On 17 October 1970, Rose gave birth to their first child: a daughter they named Heather Ann (speculation remains that Heather may have been sired by Rose's own father). Two months later, Fred was imprisoned for the theft of car tyres and a vehicle tax disc. He remained imprisoned until 24 June 1971. As he served this six-and-a-half-month sentence, Rose, having just turned 17, looked after the three girls, with Charmaine and Anna Marie being told to refer to Rose as their mother.

According to Anna Marie, she and Charmaine were frequently subjected to criticism, beatings, and other forms of punishment throughout the time they lived under Rose's care at Midland Road. Although Anna Marie was generally submissive and prone to display emotion in response to the physical and mental hardships she and her sister endured, Charmaine repeatedly infuriated Rose by her stoic refusal to either cry or display any sign of grief or servitude no matter how severely she was physically abused. Despite the years of neglect and abuse, Charmaine's spirit had not been broken, and she talked wistfully to Anna Marie of the belief she held that her "mummy will come and save me". Anna Marie later recollected her sister repeatedly antagonised Rose by making statements such as: "My real mummy wouldn't swear or shout at us" in response to Rose's scathing language. A childhood friend of Charmaine's named Tracey Giles, who had lived in the upper flat of 25 Midland Road, would later recollect an incident in which she had entered the Wests' flat, unannounced, only to see Charmaine, naked and standing upon a chair, gagged and with her hands bound behind her back with a leather belt, as Rose stood alongside the child with a large wooden spoon in her hand. According to Giles, Charmaine had been "calm and unconcerned", while Anna Marie had been standing by the door with a blank expression on her face.

Hospital records reveal Charmaine had received treatment for a severe puncture wound to her left ankle in the casualty unit of Gloucestershire Royal Hospital on 28 March 1971. This incident was explained by Rose to have resulted from a household accident.

=== Murder of Charmaine West ===
Rose is believed to have killed Charmaine shortly before Fred's prison release date of 24 June 1971. She is known to have taken Charmaine, Anna Marie and Heather to visit Fred on 15 June. It is believed to be on or very shortly after this date that Charmaine was murdered. As well as forensic odontology confirmation that Charmaine had died while Fred was still incarcerated, further testimony from Tracey Giles' mother, Shirley, corroborated the fact that Charmaine had been murdered before Fred had been released on 24 June. In her later testimony at Rose's trial, Shirley stated she and her family had lived in the upper flat of Midland Road in 1971 and that her two daughters had been playmates of Charmaine and Anna Marie. She stated that after her family had vacated the upper flat of Midland Road in April 1971, on one day in June, she had brought Tracey to visit Charmaine, only for Tracey to be told by Rose: "She's gone to live with her mother, and bloody good riddance!" before Tracey began to weep. Shirley Giles was adamant that Fred was still in prison on this occasion.

As with the Giles family, Rose explained Charmaine's disappearance to others who enquired about her whereabouts by claiming that Rena had called and taken her eldest daughter to live with her in Bristol. She contradictorily informed staff at Charmaine's primary school that the child had moved with her mother to London. When Fred was released from prison on 24 June, he allayed Anna Marie's concerns for her sister's whereabouts by claiming her mother had collected Charmaine and returned to Scotland. In her autobiography, Out of the Shadows, Anna Marie recollected that when she asked why her mother had collected Charmaine but not her, Fred callously replied, "She wouldn't want you, love. You're the wrong colour."

Charmaine's body was initially stowed in the coal cellar of Midland Road until Fred was released from prison. He later buried her naked body in the yard close to the back door of the flat, and remained adamant he had not dismembered her. A subsequent autopsy suggested the body had been severed at the hip; this damage may have been caused by building work Fred conducted at the property in 1976. Several bones—particularly patellae, finger, wrist, toe and ankle bones—were missing from her skeleton, leading to the speculation the missing parts had been retained as keepsakes (this proved to be a distinctive discovery in all the autopsies of the victims exhumed in 1994).

=== Murder of Catherine "Rena" West ===
Rena maintained sporadic contact with her children on each occasion she and Fred separated. She is also known to have visited Moorcourt Cottage to enquire as to her children's whereabouts and welfare in the latter half of August 1971. Fred's sister-in-law, Christine, later recollected Rena was depressed and extremely anxious about her children's welfare. Being provided with Fred's Midland Road address, Rena sought to confront him—likely to discuss or demand custody of her daughters. This was the final time Rena was seen alive. She is believed to have been murdered by strangulation, possibly in the back seat of Fred's Ford Popular and likely while intoxicated. When her body was discovered, a short length of metal tubing was found with her remains, leaving an equal possibility she had been restrained and subjected to a sexual assault prior to her murder. Rena's body was extensively dismembered, placed into plastic bags, and buried close to a cluster of trees known as Yewtree Coppice at Letterbox Field, about one mile (1.6 km; 1,600 m) from Much Marcle.

== Marriage to Letts ==
On 29 January 1972, Fred and Rosemary married. The ceremony took place at Gloucester Register Office, with Fred incorrectly describing himself upon the marriage certificate as a bachelor. No family or friends were invited apart from Fred's brother John, who acted as best man. Several months later, with Rose pregnant with her second child, the couple moved from Midland Road to an address nearby: 25 Cromwell Street. Initially, the three-storey home was rented from the council; Fred later purchased the property from the council for £7,000. To facilitate the Wests' purchasing the property from the council, many of the upper floor rooms were initially converted into bedsits to supplement the household income. To maintain a degree of privacy for his own family, Fred installed a cooker and a washbasin on the first-floor landing in order that their lodgers need not enter the ground floor where the West family lived, and only he and his family were permitted access to the garden of the property. On 1 June, Rose gave birth to a second daughter. The date of her birth led Fred and Rose to name the child Mae June.

=== Prostitution ===
Shortly after giving birth to her second child, Rose began to work as a prostitute, operating from an upstairs room at their residence and advertising her services in a local contact magazine. Fred encouraged Rose to seek clients in Gloucester's West Indian community through these advertisements. In addition to her prostitution, Rose engaged in casual sex with both male and female lodgers within their household, and individuals Fred encountered via his work. She also bragged to several people that no man or woman could completely satisfy her. When engaging in sexual relations with women, Rose would gradually increase the level of brutality to which she subjected her partner with acts such as partially suffocating her partner, or inserting increasingly large dildos into her partner's body. If the woman resisted or expressed any pain or fear, this would greatly excite Rose, who would typically ask: "Aren't you woman enough to take it?"

To many of these women, it became apparent Rose and her husband (who regularly participated in threesomes with his wife and her lovers) took a particular pleasure from seeking to take women beyond their sexual limits—typically via sessions involving bondage, as the Wests openly admitted to taking a particular pleasure from any form of sex involving a strong measure of dominance, pain and violence. To cater to these fetishes, they amassed a large collection of bondage and restraining devices, magazines and photographs—later expanding this collection to include videos depicting bestiality and graphic child sexual abuse.

Rose controlled the West family finances, with Fred giving her his pay packets. The room Rose used for prostitution was known throughout the West household as "Rose's Room", and had several hidden peepholes allowing Fred—a longtime voyeur—to watch her entertain her clients. He also installed a baby monitor in the room, allowing him to listen from elsewhere in the house. The room included a private bar, and a red light outside the door warned when Rose was not to be disturbed. Rose carried the sole key to this room around her neck, and Fred installed a separate doorbell to the household which Rose's clients were instructed to ring whenever they visited the household. Much of the money earned from Rose's prostitution was spent on home improvements.

By 1977, Rose's father had come to tolerate his daughter's marriage, and to develop a grudging respect for Fred. Together, he and Fred opened a café they named The Green Lantern, which was soon insolvent. When Bill Letts discovered Rose's prostitution, he would also visit to have sex with his daughter. By 1983, she had given birth to eight children, at least three of whom were conceived by clients. (Note: The final five children Rose gave birth to were: Tara (b. 1977); Louise (b. 1978); Barry (b. 1980); Rosemary Jr. (b. 1982); and Lucyanna (b. 1983). Only Barry West is believed to have been fathered by Fred, with at least three of the other children conceived by clients.) Fred willingly accepted these children as his own, and falsely informed them the reason their skin was darker than that of their siblings was because his great-grandmother was a black woman.

=== Domestic violence ===
When each of the West children reached the age of seven, they were assigned numerous daily chores to perform in the house. They were rarely allowed to socialise outside the household perimeters unless either of their parents were present, and had to follow strict guidelines imposed by their parents, with severe punishment—almost always physical—being the penalty for not conforming to the household rules. The children feared being the recipients of violence from their parents, the vast majority inflicted by Rose, occasionally by Fred. The violence was sometimes irrational, indiscreet or just inflicted for Rose's gratification; she always took great care not to mark the children's faces or hands in these assaults. Firstly Heather, and subsequently her younger brother Stephen (born 1973), ran away from home; both returned to Cromwell Street after several weeks of alternately sleeping rough or staying with friends, and both were beaten when they returned home. Between 1972 and 1992, the West children were admitted to the Accident and Emergency department of local hospitals 31 times; the injuries were explained as accidents and never reported to social services.

On one occasion, as Stephen was mopping the kitchen floor with a cloth, Rose accidentally stepped into the bowl of water he had been using. In response, Rose hit the boy over the head with the bowl, then repeatedly kicked him in the head and chest as she shouted: "You did that on purpose, you little swine!" On another occasion, Rose became furious about a missing kitchen utensil, then grabbed a knife she had been using to cut a slab of meat, repeatedly inflicting light scour marks to Mae's chest until her rib cage was covered with light knife wounds. All the while, Mae screamed, "No, Mum! No, Mum!" as Stephen and Heather stood by, helplessly sobbing.

Even Fred occasionally became the recipient of his wife's violence. On one occasion in August 1974, Rose chased after Fred with a carving knife in her hand; Fred was able to slam shut the door of the room into which he had run as Rose lunged at him with the knife, resulting in the knife embedding itself in the door, and three of Rose's fingers sliding down the blade, almost severing them from her hand. In response, Rose calmly wrapped her hand in a towel and said: "Look what you done, fella. You've got to take me to the hospital now."

== Initial sexual assaults ==
=== Anna Marie West ===
In September 1972, the Wests led eight-year-old Anna Marie to the cellar at 25 Cromwell Street, where the child was forced to undress, with Rose tearing her dress from her body upon noting the child's hesitation. She was restrained before Fred raped her with Rose's active encouragement. After the rape, Rose followed Anna Marie to the bathroom and handed her a sanitary towel, explaining to the child: "I'm sorry. Everybody does it to every girl. It's a father's job. Don't worry, and don't say anything to anybody." Making clear these sexual assaults would continue, Fred and Rose then threatened the child with severe beatings if they ever received word she had divulged the sexual abuse she endured at their hands. (Note: In her autobiography, Out of the Shadows, Anna Marie later reflected that her father and stepmother generally viewed all females from the age of "about eight upwards" as "women" capable of—and needing—frequent sexual activity.)

Rose occasionally sexually abused Anna Marie herself, and later took extreme gratification in degrading her with acts such as binding Anna Marie to various items of furniture before encouraging Fred to rape her, and forcing her to perform household chores while wearing sexual devices and a mini-skirt. From the age of 13, Fred and Rose forced Anna Marie to prostitute herself within the household, with her clients being informed Anna Marie was 16. Rose was always present in the room when these acts occurred, to ensure Anna Marie did not reveal her true age. On one occasion when Anna Marie was aged 13 or 14, Rose took her to a local pub, insisting she drink several glasses of barley wine. Several hours later, Fred arrived at the pub to collect Rose and Anna Marie. Once they had left the premises, Anna Marie was bundled into her father's van and beaten by Rose, who asked her: "Do you think you could be my friend?" before she was sexually abused by her father and stepmother.

=== Caroline Owens ===
In October 1972, the Wests hired 17-year-old Caroline Owens as their children's nanny. They had picked her up one night on a secluded country road as she hitchhiked from Tewkesbury to her Cinderford home, having visited her boyfriend. Learning that Owens disliked her stepfather and was looking for a job, the Wests offered her part-time employment as a nanny to the three children then in their household, with a promise she would be driven home each Tuesday. Several days later, Owens moved into 25 Cromwell Street, sharing a room with Anna Marie, who Owens noted was "very withdrawn".

Rose, who had begun to engage in prostitution by this time, explained to Owens that she worked as a masseuse when the younger woman enquired about the steady stream of men visiting her. According to Owens, Fred also claimed to be skilled in performing abortions, should she ever need such a service. Owens also noted Fred talked about sex almost incessantly; her suspicions as to his sexual overtones were further heightened when Fred boasted that many of the women he claimed to have performed abortions upon were so overjoyed that they would offer him their sexual services as a reward. When Owens herself became the recipient of the Wests' overt sexual advances, she announced her intentions to leave Cromwell Street and return home.

Knowing Owens' habits of hitchhiking along the A40 between Cinderford and Tewkesbury, the Wests formulated a plan to abduct her for their shared gratification. Fred later admitted that the specific intent of this abduction was the rape and likely murder of Owens, but that his initial incentive was to determine whether his wife would be willing to at least assist him in an abduction. On 6 December 1972, the couple lured Owens into their vehicle with an apology for their conduct and the offer of a lift home. Initially, Owens believed the Wests had been sincere in their apologies to her and obliged, believing she had simply mistaken their earlier intentions. Rose joined her in the back seat, with the explanation she wanted a "girls' chat" as Fred drove.

Shortly thereafter, Rose began to fondle her, as Fred questioned whether she had had sex with her boyfriend that evening. When Owens began to protest, Fred stopped the car, referred to Owens as a "bitch", and punched her into unconsciousness before he and Rose bound and gagged her with a scarf and duct tape. In her subsequent statement to police, Owens stated that, at Cromwell Street, she was given a drugged cup of tea to drink, then again gagged and subjected to a prolonged sexual assault from Fred and Rose. At one stage, Fred remarked that Owens' clitoris was unusual, then lashed her genitals with a leather belt. When Owens screamed, Rose again smothered her with a pillow and further restrained her about the neck before performing cunnilingus on her. Quickly realising the gravity of her situation, Owens ceased resisting their sexual assaults.

The following morning, having noted Owens' screaming when one of his children had knocked on the door of the room in which she was restrained, Fred threatened that he and his wife would keep her locked up in the cellar and allow his "black friends" to abuse her, and that when they had finished, he would bury her body beneath "the paving stones of Gloucester". Fred then claimed he had killed hundreds of young girls, adding that Owens had primarily been brought to the house for "Rose's pleasure". He and Rose then calmly asked Owens whether she would consider returning to work as their nanny. Seeing her escape avenue, Owens agreed, and vacuumed the house to indicate her belief in becoming an extended member of the family. Later that day, Owens escaped from a launderette she and Rose had entered and returned home. Although initially too ashamed to divulge to her mother what had happened, when her mother noted the welts, bruises and exposed subcutaneous tissues on her daughter's body, Owens burst into tears and confided what had happened.

Owens' mother immediately reported her daughter's ordeal to the police, and the Wests were arrested and charged with assault, indecent assault, actual bodily harm, and rape. The case was tried at Gloucester Magistrates' Court on 12 January 1973, but by this date, Owens had decided she could not face the ordeal of testifying in court. All charges pertaining to her sexual abuse were dropped, and the Wests agreed to plead guilty to the reduced charges of indecent assault and causing actual bodily harm; each was fined £50, and the couple were allowed to walk free from court. When Owens heard this news, she attempted suicide.

== Murders ==
Three months after the Wests' assault trial, the couple committed their first known murder. The victim was a 19-year-old named Lynda Gough, with whom Fred and Rose became acquainted through a male lodger in early 1973. Gough regularly visited Cromwell Street, and engaged in affairs with two male lodgers. On 19 April, she moved into the home. On or about 20 April, other tenants were told that she had been told to leave the household after she had hit one of their children. This story was later repeated to Gough's mother when she contacted the Wests to enquire about her daughter's whereabouts. (Note: Rose had been wearing Lynda's clothing when she repeated this claim.)

When Gough's dismembered body was found, the jaw was completely wrapped in adhesive and surgical tape to silence her screams, and two small tubes had likely been inserted into her nasal cavities to allow breathing. Long sections of string and sections of knotted fabric were also discovered with her remains. Gough had likely been suspended from holes carved into the wooden beams supporting the ceiling of the cellar Fred later admitted he had devised for the purpose of suspending his victims' bodies, and likely died of either strangulation or suffocation. Her dismembered body, missing five cervical vertebrae, the patellae and numerous finger bones, was buried in an inspection pit beneath the garage.

From their later investigations, police and forensic experts concluded all the victims found in the cellar at 25 Cromwell Street had been murdered in this location, and that, like Gough, each had been dismembered in this location. Five victims were murdered and buried in the cellar at Cromwell Street between November 1973 and April 1975. The first of these victims, 15-year-old Carol Ann Cooper, was abducted on 10 November 1973. Cooper lived in the Pines Children's Home in Worcester, and was abducted after spending the evening at a cinema with her boyfriend. She had been waiting for a bus in Warndon when she vanished, and was likely dragged into Fred's car, where her face was bound with surgical tape and her arms bound with braiding cloth before she was driven to Cromwell Street. At the Wests' address, Cooper was suspended from the wooden beams of the cellar ceiling before her abuse and murder. As had been the case with Lynda, Cooper died from strangulation or asphyxiation, before her body was dismembered and buried in a shallow, cubic grave in the cellar.

Over the following 17 months, four further victims between the ages of 15 and 21 suffered a similar fate to that endured by Gough and Cooper, although the disarticulation conducted upon each successive victim, plus the paraphernalia discovered in each shallow grave, suggests each victim was likely subjected to greater abuse and torture than those previously murdered.

Following the murder of 18-year-old Juanita Mott in April 1975, Fred concreted over the floor of the entire cellar. He later converted this section of the household into a bedroom for his oldest children, and he and his wife are not known to have committed any further murders until May 1978, when Fred—either with or without Rose's participation but certainly with her knowledge—murdered an 18-year-old lodger named Shirley Robinson. Robinson had first met Fred at The Green Lantern café in April 1977, and had taken lodgings with the Wests the same month. She was heavily pregnant at the time of her murder. Although Rose—herself pregnant at the time—initially boasted to neighbours the child Robinson was carrying was her husband's, she soon developed a deep resentment of Robinson, and the motive for her murder is likely to have been the removal of a threat to the stability of the Wests' relationship. Her body was buried in the garden of 25 Cromwell Street. It was extensively dismembered, but no restraining devices were found with these remains, making a sexual motive for this murder unlikely. The unborn baby had been removed and had several bones missing. Shortly thereafter, Rose unsuccessfully submitted a claim for maternity benefit in Robinson's name with Gloucester social services. As had earlier been the case with Charmaine and Lynda, Fred and Rose allayed the suspicions of anyone who asked about Robinson's whereabouts by claiming she had relocated to live with her father in West Germany. (Note: Several weeks after the murder of Shirley Robinson, Fred and Rose informed other lodgers they had received news Robinson had given birth to a baby boy in West Germany, and that she had named her child Barry.)

The final murder Fred and Rose are known to have committed with a definite sexual motive occurred on 5 August 1979. The victim was a 16-year-old named Alison Chambers, who had run away from a local children's home to become the Wests' live-in nanny in the middle of 1979. Chambers is believed to have lived within their household for several weeks before her murder, and Rose promised Chambers she could live at a rural "peaceful farm" she claimed she and her husband owned. Her body was also buried in the garden of Cromwell Street, close to the bathroom wall, and although Chambers was likely dismembered, her skeleton was not marked by striations as the earlier victims' bodies had been. In an effort to allay any concerns from Chambers' family, with whom she had maintained regular correspondence, Fred and Rose later posted a letter, written by Chambers to her mother prior to her murder, from a Northamptonshire post box.

=== Abuse ===
The West family, pictured in their Cromwell Street home on the date of Anna Marie West's January 1984 marriage. Heather, aged 13, is at the extreme right.

Heather and Mae West became the focus of Fred's incestuous sexual abuse after Anna Marie ran away from home in 1979 after enduring a particularly severe beating from Rose to her stomach just days after being discharged from hospital for treatment of an ectopic pregnancy. The frequency of the abuse endured by Heather and Mae increased when both girls reached puberty. Fred was overt and unapologetic in his conduct, and would justify his actions with the simple explanation: "I made you; I can do what I like with you." He further referred to his intentions to impregnate both his daughters on at least one occasion, and would occasionally force all his children to watch pornography with him. As Heather, Mae and their younger brother Stephen were very close in age, the trio resolved that if their father asked either of the two girls to be alone in a room with him, they would only do so if at least one other member of the trio were present to avoid either girl being raped. Both girls also developed a regime whereby they would only shower or undress when their father was either out of the house, or as her sister stood guard at the door. Stephen was also informed by his father that he would have to have sex with his mother by the age of 17 (in the event, his parents evicted him from their home when he was 16).

Although the girls were repulsed by their father's behaviour, Mae—having once endured Fred's throwing a vacuum cleaner at her when she remonstrated against his fondling her—developed a mechanism whereby she would tolerate Fred's sexually fondling her, then jokingly brush aside any efforts he made to take the molestation further, whereas in her autobiography, Mae recollected that Heather "was affected quite badly by all of this. Even more than me." A strong suspicion remains that, by 1985 or 1986, Heather had been forced to engage in intercourse with her father, as by the mid-1980s, she developed classic symptoms of the distress felt by victims of child abuse: these included habits of her biting her nails until they bled; drinking alcohol; of warily watching her father through the corner of her eye wherever she was sitting or standing; expressing nervous fragility whenever in the presence of males; her sleep being repeatedly broken by nightmares; and her repeatedly bouncing back and forth as she sat on any chair. This distressful behaviour led to Fred and Rose suspecting Heather had lesbian inclinations, and also resulted in her becoming the increasing recipient of taunts from her father (who had never particularly liked Heather) that she was "ugly" and a "bitch". On the occasions Heather remonstrated about the abuse to her mother, Rose would simply laugh at her distress.

Heather also expressed to Mae and Stephen her desire to run away from home and live a nomadic lifestyle in the Forest of Dean, and to never again see any human beings.

== Murder of Heather West ==
Heather did complain to friends about the abuse she and her siblings endured, and her external signs of psychological distress were noted by several of them. Staff at the Hucclecote Secondary School, which Heather and her siblings attended, are also known to have expressed concern as to why Heather—a studious and obedient pupil—refused to obey orders either to change her clothing for, or shower after, sporting activities. On one occasion, she was forced to take a shower, resulting in her peers and staff noting her arms, legs and torso were covered in welts and bruises in various stages of healing. Heather attempted to excuse these injuries as having been obtained in fights with her siblings, but confided in one close friend that they had been inflicted by her parents, adding that her mother considered her a "little bitch" who deserved her beatings.

By the mid-1980s, rumours of Rose's sex life had reached several of the children's classmates, and although the West children had been instructed never to divulge details of their home lives to their peers, Heather confided to her friends that many of these rumours were true. The father of one of these classmates was a friend of the Wests; as such, word soon reached Fred and Rose that Heather had divulged details of her home life—including details of her mother's promiscuity—to her classmates. Fred was so concerned by these revelations that he began to escort Heather to and from school.

After Heather left school in the summer of 1986, she applied for numerous jobs in an effort to leave Cromwell Street. By June of the following year, she had pinned her hopes on escaping the household via obtaining a job as a chalet cleaner at a holiday camp in the seaside town of Torquay. She received notification that this application had been unsuccessful on 18 June 1987. In response, she crumpled into tears before her siblings Mae and Stephen. That same evening, her whole family heard Heather sobbing aloud as she attempted to sleep, and according to Mae, she "cried all the way through the night". The following morning, on 19 June, Heather was "back to her usual self, looking miserable, biting her nails and sitting on the couch bouncing back and forth as she sat" as her siblings left the house to go to school.

When Heather's siblings returned home, they were informed Heather had left to accept the job she had previously been refused in Torquay (a story the Wests also relayed to other family members); however, Rose told an enquiring neighbour that she and Heather had had a "hell of a row", and that Heather had run away from home. Later, to answer their children's questions about why Heather failed to contact or visit her siblings, the parents claimed that Heather had eloped with a lesbian lover. When Mae and Stephen suggested they report Heather's disappearance to police, Fred changed his story yet again, saying it would be unwise to initiate a search for Heather as she was involved in credit card fraud. On more than one occasion, Fred and Rose persuaded an unknown acquaintance to fake a phone call from Heather to her parents.

In the years following Heather's disappearance, Fred occasionally jokingly threatened the children that they would "end up under the patio like Heather" if they either misbehaved or divulged the mistreatment they endured to anyone outside the household. With Rose's approval, he later constructed a barbecue pit immediately opposite where Heather had been buried, and placed a pine table on her grave for the children of the family to sit upon whenever the Wests held family gatherings in their garden.

Heather's disappearance, Fred and Rose's constantly changing stories about their daughter's whereabouts, plus their allusions to foul play, ultimately led to police enquiries as to Heather's whereabouts. These enquiries culminated in a search warrant being issued to excavate the Wests' garden in February 1994.

== Arrest ==
In May 1992, Fred asked his 13-year-old daughter, Louise, to bring some bottles to a room on the first floor of their home. Rose was not present in the home at the time. Shortly thereafter, the girl's siblings heard her scream, "No, don't!" Later, Fred returned downstairs. Louise was found by her siblings writhing in pain, sobbing that her father had raped and sodomised her, at one stage partially strangling her. When Rose returned home, Louise confided in her mother that she had been raped by Fred; Rose replied, "Oh well. You were asking for it." Over the following weeks, Louise was raped on three further occasions, with Rose personally witnessing one of these rapes before following her distressed and bleeding daughter into the bathroom and asking the child, "Well, what did you expect?" Fred also filmed one of these rapes. Several weeks later, Louise garnered the courage to confide in a close friend what her father had done; this friend told her own mother what had happened on 4 August. In response, the friend's mother anonymously informed the police.

On 6 August 1992, the police searched the West household on the pretext of searching for stolen property. Although numerous objects of sexual paraphernalia—including 99 pornographic videos of both home-made and commercial nature—were discovered, police did not find the video depicting the rape of Fred's daughter. The 13-year-old made a full statement through a specially-trained solicitor, describing her father's actions, the fact the sexual abuse had begun when she was 11, and that her mother had been casually indifferent to her plight. All the children in the household were placed in foster care the following day. Medical examinations revealed evidence of physical and sexual abuse. (Note: Journalist and author Howard Sounes has also claimed the younger West children were "afflicted with speech impediments and squints.")

The West children also divulged their mother had inflicted most of the physical abuse and that their father frequently said that if they told anyone about the goings-on in the household they would be "buried under the patio" like their sister Heather.

=== Investigation ===
Police began a full-scale investigation, eventually leading to Fred being charged with three counts of rape, and one of buggery, with Rose as an accomplice. She was also charged with child cruelty, inciting her husband to engage in sex with their daughter, and obstructing the police. The Wests were questioned as to the whereabouts of their eldest daughter, and although Fred claimed Heather was "alive and well" and supporting herself via prostitution, Rose initially claimed to have no knowledge of Heather's whereabouts, or why she had left home. She claimed on 11 August that she could "remember now" that her daughter had left home at her own persuasion due to Rose's concerns her other children may discover Heather's supposed lesbian inclinations. Rose then added she had also given her daughter £600 to incentivise her to leave the household, before further claiming to have maintained sporadic telephone contact with her daughter over the years. The following day, Rose was granted bail on the condition she did not maintain contact with her children, her stepdaughter, or her husband prior to her upcoming trial.

As Fred awaited trial, he was held on remand in Birmingham. Learning that her father had denied any wrongdoing, Anna Marie also contacted police to offer a full statement detailing her experiences as a child. In a statement given to Detective Constable Hazel Savage, Anna Marie recounted the extensive physical, mental and sexual abuse she had endured as a child at the hands of her father and stepmother, before agreeing to testify against both parents at their upcoming trial. Anna Marie also added she had, for several years, been unsuccessfully attempting to trace her mother Rena and half-sisters Charmaine and Heather. Further enquiries conducted with Anna Marie's husband, Chris Davis, revealed that Heather had confided in him just how unhappy she was shortly before her disappearance, and of her desire to leave home. Davis elaborated that although Heather had not divulged any details about her enduring any sexual abuse, he had been so concerned for her welfare he had offered to confront her parents, and Heather had dissuaded him from doing so, blurting out, "For Christ's sake don't, because they'll kill us both!" Davis then suggested they might wish to speak with Heather to garner further details of her abuse.

In their efforts to gather further evidence, police and social services also spoke with Mae, who, having spoken with her 13-year-old sister and learned Louise did not wish to see her father charged, initially denied she had endured any molestation as an adolescent. Police then focused their attentions on tracing Heather in efforts to corroborate Anna Marie's claims of sexual abuse, but enquiries to the Inland Revenue and the Social Security department held no records attesting to her being alive. Two months later, Gloucester social services also contacted police to stress their concern over the whereabouts of Heather.

This case against the Wests collapsed when Anna Marie and her 13-year-old half-sister Louise declined to testify at the court case on 7 June 1993, with the child rape victim expressing her desire to return to her family, and Anna Marie choosing to withdraw her statement because of her noting the misery of her younger siblings, and her fear of Rose's vindictiveness. Shortly thereafter, Anna Marie spoke further with DC Savage, further emphasising that her mother Rena and half-sister Charmaine were also missing.

=== Search warrant ===
Although the Wests were acquitted of all charges, all their younger children remained in foster care, albeit with permitted supervised visitations to Cromwell Street. Despite the Wests claiming to the few relatives from whom they were not already estranged by 1993 that the charges had been fabricated by police, almost all of their remaining family members severed contact with them. Meanwhile, police continued investigating the disappearance of Heather, noting no records existed indicating she was still alive. When Anna Marie was questioned as to the colloquial "family joke" regarding Heather being buried beneath the patio, she confirmed that the sole time she had heard her father recite this claim, he had immediately burst into laughter, leading to her refusing to take this claim seriously.

In retracing Fred's history, police also discovered that although Rena and Charmaine had disappeared in 1971, no missing person report had ever been filed on either of them. DC Savage and her colleagues were convinced Heather was dead, and that Fred's repeated statement to his children that her body lay beneath the family patio might be true. On 23 February 1994, Gloucester police successfully applied for a search warrant authorising the search of 25 Cromwell Street to locate Heather's remains.

When police visited the address on 24 February and showed the warrant to Rose, she turned pale, before becoming hysterical and shouting over her shoulder to her eldest son, Stephen, "Get Fred!" Rose became contradictory in her informal questioning as to the circumstances surrounding Heather's disappearance. When reminded of these contradictions, she became distraught and abusive, shouting at the officers: "I can't fucking remember! It's a bloody long time ago! What do you think I am? A bloody computer?"

Fred had been working in Stroud at the time; upon hearing of the police's intentions, he assured Stephen he would be home immediately. When Fred arrived three hours later, he informed his family of his intention to voluntarily offer a witness statement to police regarding his daughter's whereabouts. Despite Fred's insistence in this statement that Heather had been "alive and well", albeit involved in a drugs cartel, and that the claims he and his wife had made as to Heather being buried beneath the family patio were simply "rubbish", police were unassuaged. In response, Fred abruptly changed tactics, claiming they simply held a grudge against him due to his 1993 acquittal of the rape of his daughter.

That evening, with the search team having left their premises and a uniformed officer remaining at Cromwell Street to guard the excavation site, Mae and Stephen observed their parents talking in hushed tones as they repeatedly glanced towards the garden from their kitchen window.

In the early hours of the following morning, as his son Stephen was about to leave for work, Fred informed him: "Look son, look after mum and sell the house [...] I've done something really bad. I want you to go to the papers and make as much money as you can." Shortly thereafter, police returned to Cromwell Street to continue their search for Heather's body. Upon their arrival, Fred indicated his wish to be arrested for Heather's murder and to be taken to Bearland police station to provide a full confession; he was then arrested and formally cautioned.

== Discoveries ==
At 11:15 that morning, Fred formally admitted to police he had indeed killed his daughter, albeit in an act of manslaughter. He confessed to strangling Heather in a fit of rage, then dismembering her body in the ground floor bathroom with a heavy serrated knife he normally used for cutting slabs of frozen meat. Her remains had been stored in a dustbin as he waited for an opportunity to dig her grave. Fred was insistent his wife had no knowledge of her daughter's murder, claiming he had committed this murder as Rose was preoccupied with one of her clients, adding the fact the search team had not yet unearthed Heather's remains was because they had been excavating the wrong section of his garden. He then volunteered to accompany police to the house to pinpoint the precise location of Heather's body. Upon receipt of this confession, Fred's solicitor, Howard Ogden, and Janet Leach, his appointed appropriate adult, informed Mae and Stephen their father had confessed to their sister's murder. In response, Stephen slumped against a wall and began sobbing; Mae entered a state of shock before stammering that her father had not killed her sister.

The following day (26 February), police began excavating the section of the garden at Cromwell Street where Fred indicated he had buried his daughter's body. Shortly after 4 p.m., police found a human thigh bone protruding from a section of the garden Fred had insisted police need not look in. Excavating the section of the garden where Fred had indicated he had buried his daughter's body, investigators discovered a mass of jumbled human remains encased in the remnants of a bin bag and intertwined with two lengths of rope. These dismembered remains were taken to the police headquarters for further examination, where they were determined to be those of a young woman, with one kneecap and several phalanges missing. The decedent's fingernails were discovered in a pile, suggesting they may have been torn from her fingers as a means of torture. Several hours later, the body was identified via dental records as being that of Heather West.

That evening, having been formally charged with his daughter's murder and questioned as to why police had also discovered a third thigh bone, Fred confessed there were two further sets of human remains in his garden, and agreed to return to Cromwell Street to reveal the locations of both graves; one of whom he named as Shirley Robinson, whom he described as being a former tenant and a lesbian who had been heavily pregnant with his child at the time of her 1978 murder; the other victim he described (incorrectly) as being "Shirley's mate", but either could not or would not elaborate as to her identity. Both sets of remains were discovered on 28 February, and Fred was charged with both murders two days later.

Having discovered three sets of human remains in the garden, a decision was made to thoroughly search the entire property. Rose was placed into a safe house in the nearby town of Dursley as police commenced their search inside 25 Cromwell Street. Informed of this fact, and with the formal interviews conducted by the investigative team lasting up to 16 hours each day and including persistent questioning as to the whereabouts of his first wife Rena and stepdaughter Charmaine, Fred authorised his solicitor to pass a note he had written to the leader of the murder investigation: Superintendent John Bennett of the Gloucestershire Police. This note—dated 4 March—read: "I, Frederick West, authorise my solicitor, Howard Ogden, to advise Superintendent Bennett that I wish to admit a further (approx) nine killings, expressly Charmaine, Rena, Lynda Gough and others to be identified. F. West."

Questioned further as to his claims, Fred calmly explained there were a further five bodies buried in his cellar, and a sixth body beneath the ground-floor bathroom. Most of these victims, Fred claimed, had been hitchhikers or girls he had murdered in the 1970s after picking them up at bus stops. Initially, Fred claimed these six victims had been killed when they had threatened to inform Rose of his infidelity with women, and that he had transported their bodies to Cromwell Street to abuse, dismember, and then bury in shallow graves. The dismemberment, Fred claimed, had made it easier to bury the remains in shallow, cubical graves, and he agreed to return to Cromwell Street to indicate precisely where he had buried each victim.

Between 5 and 8 March, police found six further bodies of young females at 25 Cromwell Street. Each victim had been extensively mutilated, and each body bore evidence of having been subjected to extreme sexual abuse prior to the act of murder. For example, the third set of remains discovered in the cellar was found with a length of cloth wrapped around the skull, and an oval of adhesive tape 16 inches (41 cm) in circumference found with the remains had likely been used to gag this victim, whose ankles and wrists were also bound with a large section of rope. Also found in this grave was a large, serrated knife. The second set of remains was found with a section of tubing twisted into a U-shape alongside her severed limbs, and her skull was found encased in adhesive tape which had been wrapped around the section where her face had been 11 or 12 times, with a narrow plastic tube inserted where the nasal cavities had been in an effort to allow her to breathe prior to her murder. Each set of remains was missing numerous bones, particularly phalanges; when questioned, Fred refused to divulge the whereabouts of the bones missing from each set of remains, or the reason for their absence.

=== Arrest of Rose West ===
Despite Fred's insistence that his wife held no knowledge of any of the murders, investigators suspected otherwise. Rose was arrested on 20 April 1994, initially on offences relating to the rape of an 11-year-old girl, and the physical assault of an eight-year-old boy—both charges dating from the mid-1970s. The following day, she was refused bail, and transferred to Pucklechurch Prison to be held in the maximum security wing. Here, she was questioned more closely about the murders, in particular those of her daughter Heather and Lynda Gough, and on 25 April she was formally charged with Gough's murder.

By 6 May, Fred and Rose were jointly charged with five counts of murder, with Rose simply replying, "I'm innocent" upon hearing each formal charge—a response that proved to be a theme throughout each of the 46 interviews investigators held with Rose prior to her trial.

As well as the murders of the victims exhumed from Cromwell Street, Fred had confessed to the murders of his first wife and stepdaughter, and to knowing the location of Anne McFall's remains (although he always denied killing her). Fred agreed to identify each burial location, and the remains were unearthed between 10 April and 7 June. He was then transferred to Birmingham's HM Prison Birmingham, where a strict suicide watch called for his cell to be checked every 15 minutes.

== Formal charges ==
Fred and Rose West were brought before a magistrates' court in Gloucester on 30 June 1994; he was charged with 12 murders and she with nine. This was the first time the couple had seen each other since Fred's February arrest. Prior to hearing the formal charges against them, Fred leaned toward his wife and gently placed his hand upon her shoulder; in response, Rose—having ignored her husband's presence—visibly winced in discomfort. Both were ordered held on remand.

As police attempted to lead Fred from the hearing, he resisted their efforts, and again attempted to move towards Rose, who again winced and attempted to writhe away from his grasp.

Immediately after this court appearance, Fred was re-arrested on suspicion of murdering Anne McFall, whose body had been found on 7 June but had not been officially identified until this date; he was formally charged with McFall's murder on 3 July, appearing in court the following morning.

=== Diversion of culpability ===
As he was held on remand at HM Prison Birmingham in the months following his arrest, Fred became increasingly depressed. This became worse after Rose's public rejection of him at Gloucester Magistrates' Court on 30 June, her refusal to reply to letters he sent her, and reports leaked to the press in which she (Rose) had assumed the role of a grieving mother who had lost a daughter and stepdaughter to her husband and in which she declared both her innocence of murder, and her hatred of him.

Fred pleaded with Stephen and Anna Marie (the only children to visit their father while he was on remand) to convey to Rose that he loved her, but Rose never acknowledged these overtures. (Note: At a further remand appearance held at Gloucester Magistrates' Court on 13 December, Fred and Rose saw each other for the final time. On this occasion, Rose briefly glanced at Fred, staring icily, before turning away and completely ignoring him for the remainder of the hearing, informing two female prison officers to tell Fred that she never wished to speak to him again. This would be the final time the two would see each other.) In response, Fred withdrew his earlier confessions to having acted alone in the murders, and instead accused his wife of almost total culpability in all the murders to which he had been charged, excluding that of Anne McFall, which he claimed had been committed by his first wife. (Note: In July 1994, Fred would also claim his brother John had participated several of the murders.)

== Death ==
To Rose West, Steve and Mae,

Well Rose it's your birthday on 29 November 1994 and you will be 41 and still beautiful and still lovely and I love you. We will always be in love.

The most wonderful thing in my life was when I met you. Our love is special to us. So, love, keep your promises to me. You know what they are. Where we are put together for ever and ever is up to you. We loved Heather, both of us. I would love Charmaine to be with Heather and Rena.

You will always be Mrs. West, all over the world. That is important to me and to you.

I haven't got you a present, but all I have is my life. I will give it to you, my darling. When you are ready, come to me. I will be waiting for you.

— Fred West's suicide note

The initially strict suicide watch having been relaxed, on 1 January 1995 Fred West asphyxiated himself in his cell by wrapping an improvised rope he had constructed from a blanket and tags he had stolen from prison laundry bags around his neck, then binding this device to a door handle and window catchment and sinking to his knees.

At the bottom of the suicide note found in his cell was a drawing of a gravestone, within which was written: "In loving memory. Fred West. Rose West. Rest in peace where no shadow falls. In perfect peace he waits for Rose, his wife."

== Trial of Rose West ==
At pretrial proceedings in February, Rose pleaded not guilty to ten charges of murder (the murder of Charmaine West having been added to the original nine after Fred's suicide, and two counts of rape and indecent assault of young girls having been dropped with a view for later resubmission), though her counsel conceded that circumstantial evidence indicated Rose's willingness to subject young girls to sadistic physical and sexual abuse. Her trial at Winchester Crown Court began on 3 October 1995. She was tried before Mr Justice Mantell.

An important early decision by the judge was to admit testimony related to the sexual mistreatment of three women by Fred and Rose, accepting the prosecution's argument that it established a pattern of behaviour repeated in the murders.

=== Prosecution ===
In his opening statement, prosecutor Brian Leveson portrayed the Wests as sex-obsessed sadistic murderers, terming the bodies discovered at Cromwell Street and Midland Road "secrets more terrible than words can express ... [The victims'] last moments on Earth were as objects of the depravity of this woman and her husband". He pointed out that Fred was incarcerated when Charmaine West was killed, claimed that the Wests had each learned from their mistake in allowing Caroline Owens to live (they "would never be so trusting again"), and said that the gag on victim Thérèse Siegenthaler had a "feminine" touch‍—‌a scarf tied in a bow. He promised to demonstrate Rose's controlling and sexually sadistic character and her efforts to deflect suspicion about the disappearance of their victims.

Prosecution witnesses included Cromwell Street lodgers, victims' relatives, Rose's mother Daisy and sister Glenys, and surviving victims including Anna Marie West, Kathryn Halliday (a former lover of the Wests), Caroline Owens, and a "Miss A" (who had been sexually assaulted at 14 by Fred and Rose in 1977, and who described Rose as the more aggressive perpetrator of the two). Neighbours described Charmaine's 1971 disappearance while Fred was imprisoned, and Rose's casual indifference to Heather's disappearance.

Rosemary's counsel, Richard Ferguson, tried to discredit prosecution witnesses as either having financially exploited their connection to the case, or motivated by grudges. Owens, though admitting to receiving £20,000 for her story, described her extreme survivor's guilt: "I only want to get justice for the girls who didn't make it. I feel like it was my fault."

=== Defence testimony ===
Ferguson emphasised that Fred, before meeting Rose, had committed at least one murder strikingly similar to those at issue in the present trial, and that the prosecution's case was largely circumstantial. He contended that Rose was unaware of the extent of Fred's sadism, and urged the jury to not be prejudiced by her promiscuity and domineering manner.

Against the advice of her counsel, Rose herself testified; her manner sometimes morose and tearful, sometimes upbeat and humorous. She wept while describing herself as a victim of child abuse and rape who naively married a violent and domineering man, but joked about issues such as her "always being pregnant" in addition to laughing while describing one victim's "grandfather glasses". She also claimed never to have met six of the victims buried at Cromwell Street, and to recall very little of her assault on Caroline Owens. When shown photographs of the victims buried in the cellar and victim Alison Chambers, and asked by Brian Leveson whether she recognised any of their faces, Rose's face turned bright red, and she repeatedly stuttered as she replied, "No, sir."

When questioned as to life at Cromwell Street, Rose claimed she and Fred had lived separate lives, which was inconsistent with the earlier testimony of witnesses who had visited or lodged at their address. In reference to her relationship with her eldest child, Rose admitted her relationship with Heather were strained, before claiming to the court that her daughter was a lesbian who had physically and psychologically abused her siblings. Despite these allegations, Rose stated she had loved her daughter, and held no knowledge of her murder. Further questioned as to the contradictory explanations she and her husband had given as to Heather's disappearance, Rose claimed these discrepancies had stemmed from telephone conversations she had had with Heather after she had left home.

The defence next called a succession of women who claimed to have been attacked or assaulted by a lone male whose physical description matched that of Fred West between 1966 and 1975. These seven women each testified they had recognised their attacker as Fred West when his photograph appeared in the media in 1994. The intention of this testimony was to illustrate to the jury that Fred was capable of abducting, assaulting or attempting to attack women without Rose, which the prosecution had never disputed. The physical recollections of several of these women varied greatly.

The final witness to testify at Rose's trial was Fred's appointed appropriate adult, Janet Leach, whom the prosecution had called to testify on 7 November in rebuttal to the tape recordings of Fred's confession which had been played to the court on 3 November and in which he had stressed Rose had "known nothing at all" about any of the murders. Leach testified that through this role, Fred had gradually begun to view her as a confidante, and had confided in her that on the evening prior to his 25 February arrest, he and Rose had formed a pact whereby he would take full responsibility for all the murders, many of which he had privately described to her as being "some of Rose's mistakes." He had further divulged that Rose had indeed murdered Charmaine while he had been incarcerated, and had also murdered Shirley Robinson. Fred had also confided that he had dismembered the victims, and Rose had participated in the mutilation and dismemberment of Shirley Robinson, having personally removed Robinson's unborn child from her womb after her death. In reference to the remaining eight murders for which Rose was charged, Leach testified that Fred had confided Rose had "played a major part" in these murders.

Upon cross examination, Leach did concede to Richard Ferguson she had earlier lied under oath about having sold her story to a national newspaper for £100,000, although she was adamant as to the sincerity of her testimony. While delivering this testimony, Leach collapsed, and the trial was adjourned for six days. She returned to complete her cross examination on 13 November.

=== Conviction ===
After seven weeks of evidence the judge instructed the jury, emphasising that circumstantial evidence can be sufficient for a finding of guilt, and that if two people take part in a murder, the law considers them equally guilty regardless of which of them actually takes the life of the victim. On 21 and 22 November, the jury returned unanimous guilty verdicts for all ten murders. Terming her crimes "appalling and depraved", Mr Justice Mantell sentenced Rosemary to life in prison, emphasising that she should never be paroled. Initially, Rose was incarcerated at HMP Bronzefield as a Category A prisoner; she was later transferred to HM Prison Low Newton before, in 2019, being transferred to HM Prison New Hall, where she continues to protest her innocence.

== Victims ==
Fred and Rose West are known to have committed at least 12 murders between 1967 and 1987; many investigators, authors, and journalists who have studied the case believe there are other victims whose bodies have never been found. Prior to his suicide, police had recorded over 108 hours of tape-recorded interviews with Fred, both when he had claimed to have acted alone in the commission of the murders, and when he had attempted to portray Rose as being the more culpable participant. On several occasions, Fred made cryptic hints he had murdered several other girls, but refused to divulge any further information beyond that he had murdered 15-year-old Mary Bastholm in 1968 and buried the body on farmland near Bishop's Cleeve. He also claimed to have killed one victim while working on a construction project in Birmingham, and that other bodies had been buried in Scotland and Herefordshire. (Note: Some investigators believe the victim Fred claimed to have murdered while he worked on a construction project in Birmingham may have been 23-year-old Elizabeth Swann, who disappeared while hitchhiking from Birmingham to Gloucester on 1 July 1974, having informed acquaintances she had obtained a receptionist's job in Gloucester and that she intended to hitchhike to the city.)

"He said to me: 'Can you remember helping me dig those holes in the garden when you were a kid?' I said I couldn't remember, but he said, 'We did it together, you know.' Then he said: 'That's where the girls were found, in the exact holes'."

— Stephen West, recounting an admission made while his father was on remand at HM Prison Birmingham, 1994.

To his appropriate adult, Fred claimed there were up to 20 further victims he and his wife had killed, "not in one place but spread around", and that he intended to reveal the location of one body per year to investigators.

While on remand, Fred made several admissions as to the fate of the victims buried at Cromwell Street to his son Stephen. Much of this information was disjointed or told in a third party manner; Fred claimed that he had extensively tortured the victims prior to their murder, but had not raped them, instead engaging in acts of necrophilia with their bodies at or shortly after the point of death. He also claimed the reason many phalange bones had been missing from the victims' bodies was because the removal of their fingers and toes had been one of the forms of torture the victims had endured, with other torture methods including the extraction of their nails, acts of mutilation, and cigarettes being stubbed out on their bodies. Furthermore, the locations of almost all the burial sites of victims—both discovered and undiscovered—was symbolic to Fred, as each had been buried at or very close to the location he had lived in or worked at the time of the victim's murder.

=== 1967 ===
- July: Anne McFall, (18). McFall's remains were found on 7 June 1994 in Fingerpost Field, Much Marcle. Her body had been placed in a rectangular pit and covered with loose topsoil. She had been pregnant with a daughter, and her pregnancy had been in its eighth month.

=== 1968 ===
- 6 January: Mary Jane Bastholm, (15). A teenage waitress at a café Fred frequented. Bastholm was abducted from a bus stop on Bristol Road, Gloucester. Fred confessed to police he had killed Bastholm after raping her in his car. She is believed to have been buried in Bishop's Cleeve. Police were unable to charge Fred with this crime as they had no evidence. Her body has never been found.

=== 1971 ===
- c. 20 June: Charmaine Carol Mary West, (8). Fred's stepdaughter. Charmaine was killed by Rose shortly before Fred's release from Leyhill Prison on 24 June, likely in a fit of domestic violence. Her remains were initially stored in the cellar at Midland Road before Fred buried the child's body in the rear garden of the flat.
- August: Catherine Bernadette Costello, (27). Rena is believed to have travelled to the Wests at 25 Midland Road to either enquire about or obtain custody of her two daughters in mid- to late-August 1971. It is believed Fred killed Rena to avoid any investigation into Charmaine's whereabouts. She is believed to have been strangled to death by Fred before her extensively mutilated body was buried in Letterbox Field.

=== 1973 ===
- c. 20 April: Lynda Carole Gough, (19). The first sexually motivated killing the Wests are known to have committed together. Gough was a lodger at 25 Cromwell Street, and shared sex partners with Rose. Following her disappearance, Gough's mother travelled to Cromwell Street to enquire as to her daughter's whereabouts, and saw Rose wearing her daughter's clothes and slippers. She was informed that Lynda had moved to find work in Weston-super-Mare. Lynda Gough's remains were buried in an inspection pit beneath the garage, which was later converted into a bathroom.
- 10 November: Carol Ann Cooper, (15). Cooper had been placed into care following her mother's death in 1966. She was last seen alive by her boyfriend in the suburb of Warndon boarding a bus to her grandmother's home. Fred referred to Cooper as "Scar Hand" in reference to a recent firework burn she had sustained. Cooper was the final victim unearthed from the cellar. Her skull was bound with surgical tape and her dismembered limbs bound with cord and braiding cloth.
- 27 December: Lucy Katherine Partington, (21). Partington was an Exeter University student and the cousin of novelist Martin Amis. She was abducted from a bus stop along the A435. Her precise date of death may have been one week after her disappearance, as Fred admitted himself into the casualty unit of the Gloucester Royal Hospital with a serious laceration of his right hand in the early hours of 3 January 1974, possibly sustained as he dismembered Partington's body. Her body was discovered in the Cromwell Street cellar on 6 March 1994.

=== 1974 ===
- 16 April: Thérèse Siegenthaler, (21). A sociology student at Greenwich Community College. Siegenthaler was abducted by the Wests as she hitchhiked from South London to Holyhead. Fred mistook her Swiss accent to be a Dutch one, and always referred to her as either "the Dutch girl" or "Tulip". She was reported missing to Scotland Yard by her family in Switzerland when communication from their daughter ceased. Fred later further concealed Siegenthaler's remains by building a false chimney breast on her grave. She was the only foreign national to be killed by the Wests.
- 15 November: Shirley Hubbard, (15). A foster child abducted from a Droitwich bus stop close to the River Severn as she travelled home from a date. Aged 15 when murdered, Hubbard had been attending work experience in Worcester, and was last seen by her boyfriend, having promised to meet him the next day. Hubbard's dismembered remains were found in a section of the cellar known to the family as the "Marilyn Monroe area". Her head had been completely covered in tape, with a one-eighth-inch (3.2 mm) diameter rubber tube inserted three inches (7.6 cm) into her nasal cavity to enable her to breathe.

=== 1975 ===
- 12 April: Juanita Marion Mott, (18). Mott had been a former lodger at 25 Cromwell Street, but was living with a family friend in Newent when she disappeared. Mott is believed to have been abducted by the Wests as she hitchhiked along the B4215. In his subsequent confessions to police, Fred would refer to Mott as "the girl from Newent".

=== 1978 ===
- 10 May: Shirley Anne Robinson, (18). Another former lodger at 25 Cromwell Street, Robinson was bisexual and engaged in casual sex with Fred and Rose. At the time of her disappearance, she had been eight months pregnant with Fred's child, and her baby boy had been due to be born on 11 June. No sexual motive existed for this murder, and the prosecution contended at Rose's trial that Robinson had been murdered as her pregnancy threatened the stability of the Wests' relationship. Fred had originally planned to sell their baby to a childless couple and had professional photographs taken with Robinson for this purpose.

=== 1979 ===
- 5 August: Alison Jane Chambers, (16). Chambers had been placed into foster care at the age of 14, and had repeatedly absconded from Jordan's Brook House. She became acquainted with the Wests in mid-1979, and Fred later claimed to his solicitor that Chambers had died as a result of Rose becoming "too bloody vicious" with her. Her dismembered body, missing several bones and with a leather belt looped beneath her jaw and tied at the top of her head, was buried in the garden of Cromwell Street. This was the final murder where a definite sexual motive was established.

=== 1987 ===
- 19 June: Heather Ann West, (16). Heather was likely to have been murdered because Fred and Rose considered her efforts to leave the household as a threat, as she divulged to her classmates the extensive physical and sexual abuse which occurred at Cromwell Street. Fred claimed he had not intended to kill his daughter, but carpet fibres found on two lengths of rope, discovered with her remains, suggested that she had been restrained and subjected to a sexual assault prior to her murder. Her body was dismembered with a heavy serrated knife and later buried in a hole in the garden, which Fred had his son dig, under the pretence of installing a fish pond. The 1994 police investigation into Heather's disappearance led to the discovery of her body, and the arrest of both her parents.

Footnotes

- As well as the 12 confirmed victims, police firmly believe Fred is also responsible for the 1968 disappearance of 15-year-old Mary Bastholm, but to date no body has been found. West's son, Stephen, has said he firmly believes the missing teenager was an early victim of his father, as Fred had openly boasted of having committed Bastholm's murder while on remand.
- In May 2021, police announced their intentions to excavate the grounds of a café in Gloucester after receiving information that the body of Mary Bastholm may have been buried at this location. This search yielded no human remains. At the time of her disappearance, Bastholm worked at this café and Fred is known to have frequented the premises. Furthermore, he is known to have conducted repair work on the drains of this café in late 1967. (Note: Fred's first known victim, Anne McFall, had previously worked at the same café.)
- No forensic evidence linked Fred to the murder of Anne McFall, and he always denied killing her. However, her body had been extensively dismembered, and was missing several phalanges. Furthermore, the cubic dimensions of the grave in which her body was buried match the modus operandi of Fred's later murders.

== Possible additional victims ==
Police firmly believe the Wests were responsible for further unsolved murders and disappearances. They believed they committed ten murders between 1971 and 1979, at least seven of which were for sexual purposes. Following the rash of murders between 1973 and 1975, Fred and Rose are not known to have committed any murders until 1978. They committed one further murder in 1979, followed by an eight-year lull until they murdered their daughter in 1987. Police do not know of any further murders they committed before their 1994 arrest, although Fred confessed to murdering up to 30 people, indicating up to 18 other undiscovered victims.

Fred's remarkably relaxed, emotionally sterile attitude towards all aspects of his crimes startled many members of the enquiry team. This prompted Superintendent John Bennett to seek the assistance of a criminal psychologist for an expert opinion on Fred's state of mind. After analysing Fred's behaviour throughout the extensive 1994 interviews, psychologist Paul Britton advised Superintendent Bennett that Fred's blasé manner indicated he had committed so many offences over such a long period that he was now indifferent to the acts of torture, mutilation and murder. Britton added that although an offender of this nature may come to offend less frequently, he would be unlikely to cease killing altogether.

One theory which may explain the sudden lull in the frequency of their murders is the fact that by the mid-1970s, the Wests had begun a practice of befriending teenage girls from nearby care homes, many of whom they sexually abused, with others encouraged to engage in prostitution within their home. The Wests established acquaintances—including several of their lodgers—willing to partake in their shared fetishes, which may have satiated the couple to a degree.

Caroline Owens, Anna Marie West, and several other survivors of sexual assaults at the Wests' hands each testified at Rose's trial that she had been by far the more calculating, aggressive and controlling of the two. Owens stated that, at one stage in her ordeal, Fred said that they had abducted Owens primarily for Rose's gratification. It is possible Rose's increasing family size, plus the fact she and her husband had, by the mid-1970s, begun seeking avenues to exploit girls from care homes in addition to acquiring contacts—willing or unwilling—to submit to their fetishes, may have led Fred and Rose to decide that these avenues of control and domination were sufficient for their satisfaction.

Four young women similar in age and physical characteristics to those Fred was later charged with murdering in Gloucestershire are known to have disappeared during the time Fred lived in Glasgow—one of whom, Margaret McAvoy, Fred had been acquainted with via his employment as an ice cream van driver. He had also rented a garden allotment adjacent to his house and which he frequently visited, although only a small section of this plot was ever cultivated. To one neighbour, Fred remarked that he used the remainder for "something special", about which he refused to elaborate. Much of the supposed cultivation of this allotment occurred in the early hours of the morning. Police were unable to investigate whether any further bodies were buried at this location, as these allotments were built over in the 1970s as a section of the M8 motorway.

== Aftermath ==
Fred's body was cremated in Coventry on 29 March 1995 in a funeral that was attended by just four of his children. In a five-minute service, in which no hymns were sung, the Reverend Robert Simpson quoted sections of Psalm 23, then added a solemn reminder to those present that they must "also remember everyone else who has also suffered because of these tragic events". His ashes are believed to have been scattered at the Welsh seaside resort of Barry Island, a location he had regularly visited both as a child and as an adult with his family.

After the 1994 arrest of their parents, the four youngest West children (born between 1978 and 1983), were given new identities to protect them from the notoriety of their family. Each child remained in foster care.

The remains of Charmaine and Rena were cremated in Kettering. At the insistence of Anna Marie West, mother and daughter shared the same coffin, and no roses were to be brought to the service by any mourners.

Two weeks after Anna Marie West delivered her testimony against her stepmother in 1995, she attempted suicide. She again attempted suicide in 1999 by throwing herself from a bridge into the River Severn. (Note: Anna Marie later changed her name to Anne Marie.)

When asked at trial why she had not spoken against the ongoing physical, emotional, and sexual abuse she had endured for seven years before running away from home when she was 15, Anna Marie emphasised that, as a child and adolescent, she had not known any other normality, adding, "[My father and stepmother] were all I had."

Stephen West is also known to have made a suicide attempt in 2002, by attempting to hang himself. In 2004, he was jailed for nine months for having unlawful sex with a 14-year-old girl on multiple occasions.

As a direct result of her tenacity in investigating the Wests, DC Hazel Savage was placed upon the annual New Year's honours list. The following year, she was awarded an MBE.

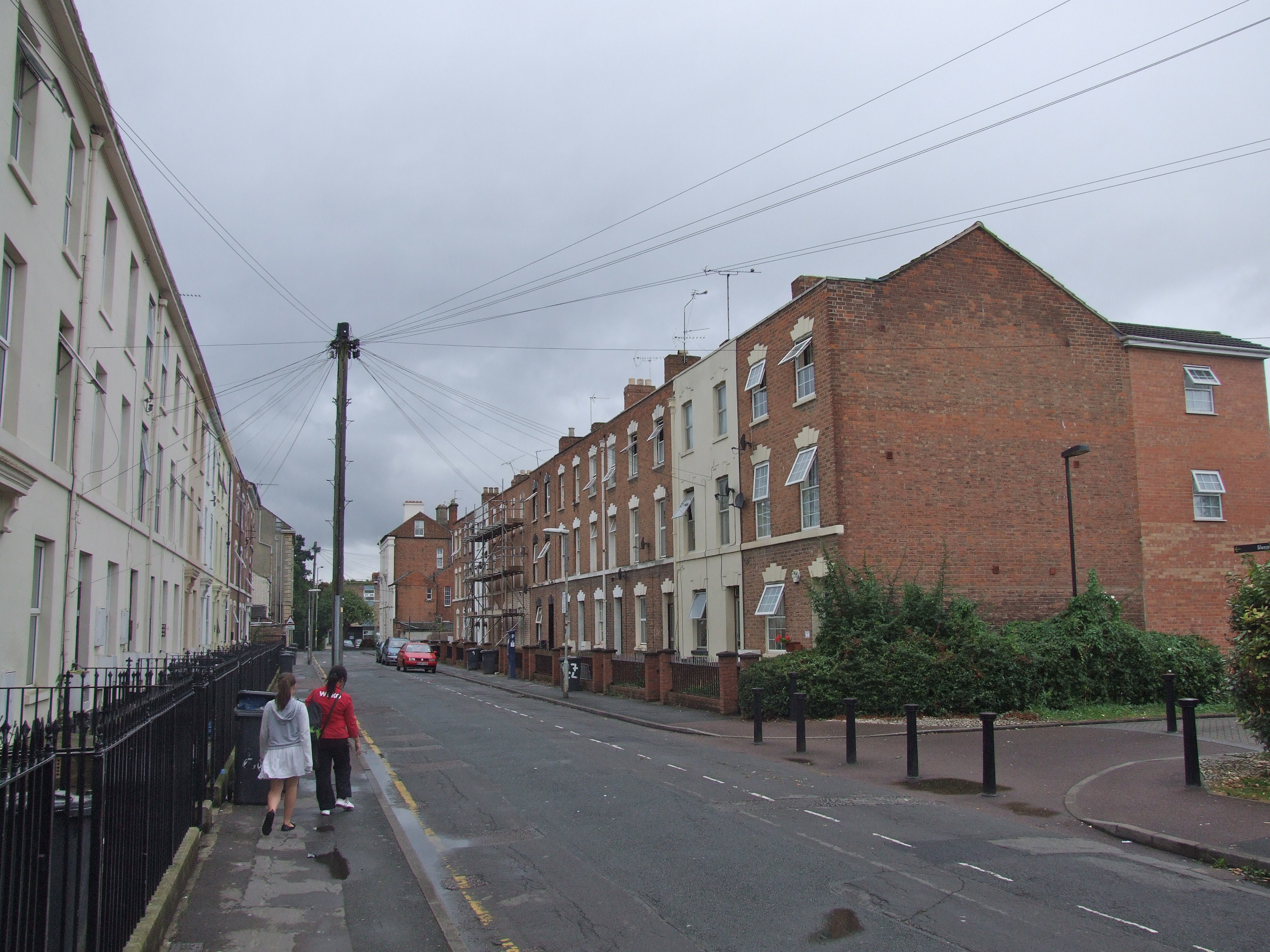
Cromwell Street, Gloucester, in 2011: No. 25 once stood in the space behind the bollards

The Wests' house in Cromwell Street was demolished in October 1996, with every piece of debris destroyed to discourage potential souvenir hunters. It had been referred to in the press as the "House of Horrors". The site was later redeveloped into a public pathway.

Fred's younger brother, John, hanged himself in the garage of his Gloucester home in November 1996. At the time of his suicide, he had been awaiting the jury verdict in his trial for the alleged multiple rapes of his niece, Anna Marie, and another underage girl at Cromwell Street in the 1970s. (Note: Anna Marie had earlier testified to having been raped approximately 300 times as a child by John West.)

In March 1996, Rose announced her intentions to appeal against her sentence, contending extensive press coverage had rendered witness testimony unreliable, that no physical evidence existed to attest she had participated in any of the murders, that the final instructions delivered by the judge to the jury had been biased in favour of the prosecution, and that undue weight had been given to the similar fact evidence introduced at her trial. This appeal was rejected by the Lord Chief Justice, Lord Taylor of Gosforth, who contended Rose had received a fair trial and efficient legal representation. In July 1997, then-Home Secretary Jack Straw subjected Rose to a whole life tariff, effectively denying her any possibility of parole. Rose again announced that she would appeal against her sentence via her solicitor Leo Goatley in October 2000; in September 2001, she announced her intentions to abandon her appeals, stating she would never feel free even if released. She maintains her innocence in any of the murders.

Both of Rose's eldest biological children and her stepdaughter, Anna Marie, initially visited her in prison on a regular basis, although by 2006, she had ceased contact with them after Mae began asking questions about her culpability in the murders. Rose offered the explanation: "I was never a parent [then] and could never be now."

The body of the Wests' former friend and housemate, Terrence Crick, was found in his car in the Scarborough district of Hackness in January 1996. He was 48 years old. Crick had become acquainted with Fred while he had lived at the Lake House Caravan Park in 1969; he had reported Fred to the authorities on several occasions after having been shown surgical instruments Fred claimed to have used to perform illegal abortions, and Polaroid images of the subjects' genitals he claimed to have taken immediately after the procedures. Crick had further informed authorities that Fred had asked him to assist in finding pregnant girls to perform abortions upon.

Crick had believed the information he had provided to police was ignored as Fred was a known police informant. The stress and guilt Crick had felt over the fact the information he had provided had not resulted in charges being brought apparently led him to take his own life. An inquest later recorded a verdict of suicide by carbon monoxide poisoning.

In 2004, one of the Wests' youngest children, Barry, claimed to have witnessed the murder of his sister Heather. According to Barry (who was seven at the time), Fred and Rose had restrained, then sexually and physically abused Heather, before Rose had repeatedly stamped upon her head until she ceased to move.

Barry West took his own life via a suspected drug overdose in October 2020 at the age of 40. For several years prior to his death, he is known to have battled a drug addiction and psychiatric problems as a result of the abuse he witnessed and endured as a child.

== Television ==
- Channel 5 commissioned a three-part documentary series about the murders. The series, titled Fred and Rose: The West Murders, was first broadcast in October 2001. This series includes extensive archive footage, interviews and imagery pertaining to the case. The series was screened a second time in 2014.
- Discovery Networks Europe commissioned a documentary focusing on the West murders as part of their Crimes that Shook the World series. Titled Crimes that Shook the World: The Wests, this documentary was released in 2006 and is narrated by Tim Pigott-Smith.
- The two-part crime drama television mini-series, Appropriate Adult, was screened in September 2011. Commissioned by ITV and directed by Julian Jarrold, Appropriate Adult concerns the role of Janet Leach, the woman asked by police to sit in interviews with Fred West as his appropriate adult.
- A second documentary commissioned by Channel 5 about the West murders, When Fred Met Rose, was screened in November 2014. This documentary includes interviews with family members of Fred West, and survivors of the couple's assaults.
- The ITV documentary Fred and Rose West: The Real Story, narrated by Trevor McDonald, was scheduled for broadcast in the UK on 31 January 2019, although broadcasting of this documentary was postponed for what has been described as "legal reasons". The documentary was broadcast on 21 February 2019.
- The three-part documentary series, Fred and Rose West: A British Horror Story, was released in May 2025. Commissioned by Netflix, this series includes interviews with Fred's solicitor Howard Ogden.

== See also ==
- List of prisoners with whole-life tariffs
- List of serial killers by number of victims
- List of serial killers in the United Kingdom

== Cited works ==
- "Fred & Rosemary West". Murder in Mind. No. 1. 1996. ISSN 1364-5803.
- Amis, Martin (2000). Experience. Vintage. ISBN 978-0-099-28582-3.
- Blundell, Nigel (1996). Encyclopaedia of Serial Killers. Promotional Reprint Company Ltd. ISBN 978-1-856-48328-5.
- Burn, Gordon (1998). Happy Like Murderers. London: Faber and Faber. ISBN 978-0-571-19546-6.
- Cawthorne, Nigel (2007). Serial Killers and Mass Murderers: Profiles of the World's Most Barbaric Criminals. Ulysses Press. ISBN 978-1-569-75578-5.
- Cawthorne, Nigel (2014). Bodies in the Back Garden: True Stories of Brutal Murders Close to Home. John Blake Publishing. ISBN 978-1-782-19986-1.
- Fido, Martin (1995). Twentieth-Century Murder. Bracken. ISBN 978-1-858-91390-2.
- Goatley, Leo (2019). Understanding Fred & Rose West: Noose, Lamella & the Gilded Cage. Troubador Publishing Limited. ISBN 978-1-913-20862-2.
- Kelleher, Michael D. (1999). Murder Most Rare: The Female Serial Killer. Random House Publishing Group. ISBN 978-0-275-96003-2.
- Masters, Brian (1996). She Must Have Known: Trial of Rosemary West. London: Doubleday. ISBN 978-0-385-40650-5.
- Roberts, Caroline (2005). The Lost Girl: How I Triumphed Over Life at the Mercy of Fred and Rose West. London: Metro Books. ISBN 978-1-84358-088-1.
- Sounes, Howard (1995). Fred and Rose: The Full Story of Fred and Rose West and the Gloucester House of Horrors. London: Warner Books. ISBN 978-0-7515-1322-6.
- Wansell, Geoffrey (1996). An Evil Love: The Life of Frederick West. London: Hodder Headline. ISBN 978-0-7472-1760-2.
- West, Anne Marie (1995). Out of the Shadows: Fred West's Daughter Tells Her Harrowing Story of Survival. Simon & Schuster. ISBN 978-0-671-71968-5.
- West, Mae; West, Stephen (1995). Inside 25 Cromwell Street: The Terrifying, True Story of Life with Fred and Rose West. The Bath Press. ISBN 978-1-898-88514-6.
- Wilson, Colin (1998). The Corpse Garden. London: True Crime Library. ISBN 978-1-874358-24-4.
- Woodrow, Jane (2011). Rose West: The Making of a Monster. Hodder & Stoughton. ISBN 978-0-340-99248-7.
