= Intermediary =

Third party that offers intermediation services between two parties

An intermediary, also known as a middleman or go-between, is defined in various ways, according to context. In law or diplomacy, an intermediary is a third party who offers intermediation services between two parties. In trade or barter, an intermediary acts as a conduit for goods or services offered by a supplier to a consumer, which may include wholesalers, resellers, brokers, and various other services. "Intermediation" refers to a process matching two sides of a market, such as buyers and sellers by a third party such as a broker, agent, or wholesaler. One common example of intermediation is in the finance industry, where it involves the matching of lenders with borrowers by a bank.

== Diplomacy ==
In diplomacy and international relations, an intermediary may convey messages between principals in a dispute, allowing the avoidance of direct principal-to-principal contact. Where the two parties are geographically distant, the process may be termed shuttle diplomacy. Where parties do not want formal diplomatic relations, an intermediary state may serve as a protecting power facilitating diplomacy without diplomatic recognition.

== Law ==
In law, the job of an intermediary involves conveying messages between principals in a dispute, preventing direct contact and potential escalation of the issue. In law, intermediaries can facilitate communication between a vulnerable witness, defendant and court personnel to acquire valuable evidence. Intermediaries can facilitate communication between a vulnerable witness or defendant and court personnel to acquire valuable evidence and to ensure all parties have a fair trial.

In law enforcement in Mexico, the concept of intermediary has emerged with the Autodefensas, a self-governing protective association of citizens, which brokers in the struggles of the state with violent, criminal organizations known as cartels.

== Trade and finance ==
In trade, an intermediary, middleman, or commercial agent acts as a conduit for goods or services offered by a supplier to a consumer. Typically the intermediary offers some added value to the transaction which may not be possible by direct trading. Examples of intermediaries are wholesalers, resellers, and agents who purchase produce from rural food producers.

Common usage includes the insurance and financial services industries where e.g. mortgage brokers, insurance brokers, and financial advisers offer intermediation services in the supply of financial products such as mortgage loans, insurance, and investment products. In relation to energy supplies, third party intermediaries provide energy-related advice, assistance in purchasing energy and management of energy needs. In a wider sense, an intermediary can be a person or organization who or which facilitates a contract between two other parties. The interests of commercial agents are protected by legislation such as the EU's Directive 86/653/EEC of 18 December 1986 on the coordination of the laws of the Member States relating to self-employed commercial agents, as implemented within each EU member state. This directive specifically notes that a "commercial agent" is an "intermediary" with continuing authority to negotiate on behalf of another person. Regulations implementing the directive cover the rights and duties of the principal and the commercial agent, the agent's remuneration, and both parties' continuing obligations after the termination of the contract between them. The UK legislation specifies that neither principals nor agents may derogate from their duties as set out in the regulations, and UK case law confirms that clear authority to contract or negotiate needs to be shown to have been granted by the principle for the negotiating party to be considered a commercial agent. The case of Londsale v Howard & Hallam Ltd. (2007) is the leading UK case on valuing compensation due for a loss of agency. The Supreme Court held that compensation should be valued according to the amount that a notional third party purchaser would pay for the agency immediately before its termination.

Trading intermediaries can be classified as merchant intermediaries or as accountant intermediaries. Bailey and Bakos (1997) analyzed a number of case studies and identified four roles of electronic intermediaries including information aggregating, providing trust, facilitating and matching.

In financial intermediation, if the matching of lenders and borrowers is successful, the lender obtains a positive rate of return, the borrower receives a return for risk taking and entrepreneurship and the banker receives a return for making the successful match. If the borrower's speculative play with the funds provided by the bank does not pay off, the bank can face significant losses on its loan portfolio, and if the bank fails its depositors can lose some of their money if the deposits are not insured by a third party.

The skill of identifying potential successful new entrepreneurs who can take market share off competitors or develop whole new markets is one of the most vital (and intangible) skills any banking system can possess. An unexpected form of entrepreneurship, and unintended consequence of microfinance initiatives, can be informal intermediation. That is, some entrepreneurial borrowers become informal intermediaries between microfinance initiatives and poorer micro-entrepreneurs. Those who more easily qualify for microfinance split loans into smaller credit to poorer borrowers. Informal intermediation ranges from casual intermediaries at the good or benign end of the spectrum to 'loan sharks' at the professional and sometimes criminal end of the spectrum.

Disintermediation occurs when potential lenders and borrowers interact more directly in the capital markets, avoiding the intermediation of banks.

In barter, the intermediary is a person or group who stores valuables in trade until they are needed, parties to the barter or others have space available to take delivery of them and store them, or until other conditions are met. The internet is creating opportunities to automate the role of an intermediary in many bartering contexts.

== See also ==
- Disintermediation
- Innovation intermediary
- Internet intermediary
- Non-Registered Intermediary
- Registered Intermediary
- Retail
- For the intermediaries legislation and UK taxation, see IR35.
