= Appropriate Adult =

- Genre: Crime drama
- Based on: The Fred West murders
- Written by: Neil McKay
- Directed by: Julian Jarrold
- Starring: Dominic West; Emily Watson; Monica Dolan; Robert Glenister; Sylvestra Le Touzel; Samuel Roukin
- Theme music composer: Dan Jones
- Country of origin: United Kingdom
- Original language: English
- No. of episodes: 2

Production
- Producers: Lisa Gilchrist; Jeff Pope
- Running time: 133 mins

Original release
- Network: ITV
- Release: 4 September – 11 September 2011

Appropriate Adult is a British crime drama television film shown in two parts on ITV, on 4 and 11 September 2011. It is based on the true story of Gloucester serial killer Fred West and his wife Rosemary West. It dealt with the events between the Wests' arrests in February 1994 and Fred's suicide in Birmingham's Winson Green Prison on New Year's Day 1995. The series stars Dominic West, Monica Dolan and Emily Watson as the protagonists of the story, Fred and Rose West, and Janet Leach, respectively.

The series was named after the role of Janet Leach as an appropriate adult during the questioning of Fred West. The senior investigator wanted to ensure that there could be no suggestion that West did not understand any part of the process, so arrangements were made so that he had an "appropriate adult" present to ensure this at all times.

It was well received critically and received eight BAFTA television award nominations, with West and Watson winning the best actor and actress awards respectively, Dolan the best supporting actress award and co-producer Kwadjo Dajan the breakthrough talent award.

== Plot ==
In Gloucester in February 1994, social worker Janet Leach is an appropriate adult, someone present during police interviews with children or vulnerable adults. She attends a police interview with Fred West, who confesses to the 1987 murder of his daughter Heather. Fred privately tells Janet there were more victims, but appropriate adults cannot share conversations. After the police find the remains of several women buried at the West home, Fred says that one of them is a lodger, Shirley Robinson, killed in 1978 when she was pregnant with his child.

Janet is given the opportunity to leave the case due to its distressing nature but resolves to continue. West tells the police there is a third body in the garden. DC Hazel Savage suspects his first wife Rena and stepdaughter Charmaine, both missing since 1971, are also buried there, and that Fred's second wife Rose was complicit, but Fred denies this. Fred appears surprised to learn that Shirley's baby had been removed from her abdomen, and tells Janet that Rose must have removed it.

Fred tells Janet he feels they have a connection. Disgusted, she decides to leave the case, but he begs her to stay. She agrees on the condition that he confess everything, and he confesses to "approximately" nine murders. The police begin digging in the Wests' basement and in the Herefordshire countryside, where Fred indicates a different area to Janet, and reminisces about his "true love", Anna McFall. DSI John Bennett is concerned that Fred's confession might have been made under duress or fabricated to impress Janet, and warns her not to get too close to him.

Janet is approached by the media. Her partner Mike, who has bipolar disorder, urges her to sell her story. He has a manic episode and is admitted to hospital. Janet's son Josh accuses her of having neglected the family. Fred tells Janet that he and Rose agreed to have Fred take the blame for the murders so Rose could look after the family. He calls Janet "Anna" and insists they are going on a journey together.

The police find remains of several more victims. Fred leads the police to a rural location, where he says he feels Anna's presence; he tells Janet that Anna is "guiding" him through her. Savage tells Janet that Anna was Fred's teenage babysitter while he was married to Rena in 1967; they had an affair, she became pregnant and then went missing.

Fred and Rose are jointly charged with murder and Savage tells Janet she is no longer required. Her family life resumes until Fred calls her from prison; she agrees to help him find a solicitor, to the dismay of Josh and Mike. A twelfth body is identified as Anna. With Janet's help, Fred begins writing a memoir.

Mike and Janet meet a journalist who suspects that the Wests may have been involved in the ritual killings of children. She agrees to sell information to him. Fred describes to Janet hearing the screams of children in a barn, and that there were at least 20 more victims. When Janet cancels her Christmas visit, Fred calls her, saying he sees more of Anna in her than in Rose.

Fred hangs himself in prison. As her duty of confidence no longer applies, she recounts everything Fred told her. Bennett dismisses Fred's book and tells her that Janet meant nothing to him. At home, Mike catches Janet preparing to overdose on pills. She confesses that she misses feeling needed and important.

In court, Janet testifies that Fred described Rose as sadistic and murderous. She lies under oath that she has never spoken to the media about the case and collapses. Appearing in court again, she admits that she had sold her story. The defence accuses her of encouraging Fred to invent lurid stories, and suggests she was romantically involved with him. She testifies that she was only interested in the truth, and Rose is found guilty and sentenced to life in prison. The journalist finds a location matching Fred's description of the barn, but Janet expresses doubt that the truth will ever be known and returns to family life.

== Production ==
The film was directed by Julian Jarrold and written by Neil McKay. The production was headed by ITV executive producer Jeff Pope, who considered it as the concluding feature in a trilogy of films about the most notorious British murder cases of the past century, the previous films being This Is Personal: The Hunt for the Yorkshire Ripper and See No Evil: The Moors Murders, which won multiple awards. Co-producer Kwadjo Dajan researched and developed the project over four years after establishing contact with Janet Leach and consulting with Gloucestershire Constabulary. The drama was filmed over seven weeks in Manchester. Dominic West's physical resemblance to West was noted during filming. Fred West's daughter Mae West said he "captured the evil essence of him – his character, his mannerisms, even his gait". Janet Leach found it difficult to approach Dominic West in character on set because he was so convincing that it took her back seventeen years to her work with the murderer.

== Cast ==
- Dominic West as Fred West
- Emily Watson as Janet Leach
- Monica Dolan as Rose West
- Robert Glenister as D.S.I. John Bennett
- Sylvestra Le Touzel as D.C. Hazel Savage
- Samuel Roukin as D.C. Darren Law
- Anthony Flanagan as Mike
- Stanley Townsend as Syd Young
- Gerard Horan as Howard Ogden
- Seline Hizli as Mae West
- James McArdle as Stephen West
- Rupert Simonian as Josh Leach
- Jasper Jacob as Brian Leveson QC
- Jack Fortune as Richard Ferguson QC
- Vincent Brimble as Mr Justice Mantell
- Robert Whitelock as D.C. Carl Kempinsky

== Reception ==
=== Critics ===
The first episode was met with positive reviews after it was broadcast on 4 September 2011. Sam Wollaston from The Guardian described it as "beautifully done, not sensational or hysterical". A later article by Phil Hogan in The Observer and The Guardian described Dominic West's performance as "worryingly close" but said "even with a set of chipped teeth, bad jumper choices and a rattling West Country burr, handsome Dominic could not quite conjure the Fred familiar from his demonic police mug shot. What he did conjure, in one impressively seamless personality, were the strange warring traits of a man cheerfully sane and yet not quite there – helpful but manipulative, confiding but controlling, troubled but carefree, a composite that perfectly explained why the police wanted the presence of an 'appropriate adult'". Hogan was also impressed with Monica Dolan's highly convincing performance as Rosemary, which he described as "literally spitting-mad". ITV claims that several daughters of the Wests and the families of the victims spoke positively about the series after having viewed it.

=== Detective Superintendent Bennett ===
Following its broadcast, the programme was also criticised by retired Gloucestershire Detective Superintendent John Bennett who said,

"the series went far beyond any justifiable claims of 'dramatic licence' and 'simplification' by creating dialogue and scenes which did not take place at all, these just sensationalising the story and not furthering it, wrongly depicting how Janet Leach was treated and her involvement, giving her a kudos she far from deserves". "This series painting her as a 'victim' and wrongly portraying the sequence of events and her contact with and payment by the Mirror Group whilst grossly exaggerating her involvement is an insult to the true victims, their families, which very much includes the extended family of the Wests, the witnesses who so courageously gave evidence, the investigating team, and its professionalism, also the many professionals and others who worked so hard to unravel the horrific crimes and bring the Wests and others to justice". However, he concurred that "the mannerisms and psyche of Frederick West captured and enacted by Dominic West and Monica Dolan of Rosemary West are hauntingly accurate".

In response to Bennett's statement, ITV's Janice Troup issued the following response:

We took the legitimate editorial decision to focus our drama on the largely untold story of how an ordinary mother and housewife, Janet Leach, became involved in one of Britain's most notorious murder investigations when she took on the role of Fred West's 'appropriate adult'. This is a drama not a documentary and the film has a caption at the start telling viewers that some scenes are created for purposes of dramatisation.

We have not attempted to whitewash Janet – her portrayal in the drama is subtle and balanced, and shows an ordinary woman subjected to an extraordinary situation. We depict her decision to accept the newspaper deal to sell her story, and how that was exposed in court during the trial of Rosemary West, as well as showing that her motivation was not simply financial. We met former Detective Superintendent John Bennett on several occasions to discuss the making of a factual drama based around the case of Fred and Rosemary West. Not only because he had led the police investigation, but also because, like others involved in the case, he had subsequently written a book about it.

He showed some interest in acting as a paid consultant on the project but we didn't pursue that option. We took the legitimate editorial decision to focus our drama on Janet Leach. It is certainly not ITV's wish to cause distress to the families of the Wests' victims, or their children. Two of Fred and Rosemary West's daughters have praised the drama and from those of the victim's families still contactable we have only received positive comments. The film neither recreates the crimes, nor attempts a definitive psychological analysis of Fred and Rosemary West. Like This Is Personal and See No Evil it is about the effect of the crimes, rather than crimes themselves. Whereas those earlier dramas focused variously on the police, the victims and their families, and the families of the murderers this one places at its centre a woman who was almost an accidental witness to the uncovering of what happened at 25 Cromwell Street.

=== Awards ===
Appropriate Adult was nominated for eight BAFTA awards at the 2012 British Academy Television Awards. Dominic West and Emily Watson won their respective leading players categories, while Monica Dolan won the best supporting actress award and Kwadjo Dajan was the winner of the breakthrough talent category. Other nominations included best mini series, director, production design and writer.

Award	Category	Nominee(s)	Result	Ref.
British Academy Television Awards	Best Mini-Series	Appropriate Adult	Nominated	
British Academy Television Awards	Best Leading Actress	Emily Watson	Won	
British Academy Television Awards	Best Leading Actor	Dominic West	Won	
British Academy Television Awards	Best Supporting Actress	Monica Dolan	Won	
British Academy Television Awards	Breakthrough Talent	Kwadjo Dajan	Won	
British Academy Television Awards	Best Director: Fiction/Entertainment	Julian Jarrold	Nominated	
British Academy Television Awards	Best Production Design	Pat Campbell	Nominated	
British Academy Television Awards	Best Writer	Neil McKay	Nominated	
Royal Television Society Programme Awards	Actor: Male	Dominic West	Won	
Royal Television Society Programme Awards	Actor: Female	Emily Watson	Won	
Royal Television Society Programme Awards	Writing: Drama	Neil McKay	Nominated	
Royal Television Society Craft & Design Awards	Make Up Design - Drama	Janet Horsfield	Won	
Royal Television Society Craft & Design Awards	Tape & Film Editing Drama	Andrew Hulme	Won	
