= Technology Intermediaries =

Technology intermediaries are an important actor of the innovation system. According to Howells their role is to act as brokers or third parties in order to build the bridges between the various participations within the open system.

== Definition ==
Innovation intermediaries focus their efforts on building bridges and closing gaps between the key actors of an innovation system which include enterprises, universities and public research organizations.

Firms are becoming more open when it comes to collaborations outside the boundaries of a firm. Though the shift to open innovation is no guarantee for a firm's success. Many companies are not able to take advantage out of the opened innovation process for different reasons. Outsourcing those activities to technology intermediaries might be a potentially useful solution.

Technology intermediaries or “tech intermediaries” are created to help firms to take advantage of technological developments. They help firms through their specialization in various R&D activities and R&D related activities to build up absorptive capacity. They can do so by helping to build the ability to scan the market for emerging technologies as well as the ability to absorb the technology and perform corresponding R&D activities. They are working as some kind of competence poles and are established to initiate innovation in specific sectors. Furthermore, they are acting as intermediaries between creators and diffusers of knowledge.

Technology intermediaries are examined by different authors and therefore various denominations like “technological communities”, “bridging organizations”, “open innovation intermediaries” or “intermediaries” are existing. They introduce various relations between the different actors of the innovation system. They are considered “instrumental in closing gaps between the principal actors”.

There are many types of technology intermediaries existing, which are very different in their nature and perform various functions. The performed activities are ranged from the diffusion and technology transfer to innovation management and the establishment of systems and methods, but also technology services that are provided to companies. The variety of intermediaries ranges from specialized government agencies and energy-service firms, electric power utilities to university liaison departments or regional technology centers. But also non-governmental organizations, research and technology organizations and cross-national networks can act as technology intermediary.

In many European countries, technology intermediaries emerge as forms of collective technology centers. They are financed mostly both by industry as well as by the public sector. Examples are the “collective research centers” in Belgium or the “Centers Techniques Industries” in France. Belgium's “collective research centers” were established in 1947 after the Second World War. Policy makers wanted to use them to boost scientific and technological research in specific fields of the economy. The intermediaries are privately held by the member companies. Because of their long-term direction and their existence for 30 to 60 years, they are considered to be useful for their members and obtained an appropriate position. The following chapters take the “collective research centers” as an example for technology intermediaries that have been examined extensively by André Spithoven and his colleagues in their scientific works. According to Spithoven et al. (2011) their operations to build absorptive capacity can be generalized to other technology intermediaries.

== Importance for Technology Intermediaries in the Open Innovation Context ==
Regarding the use of knowledge, one can distinguish between two rough activities of companies within the frame of open innovation, namely inbound open innovation and outbound open innovation.

Inbound open innovation is also often referred to as “Outside-in Process”, meaning that know-how of external sources, such as suppliers or consumers, gets transferred through the boundaries into the firm to improve the pace and quality of its innovation process. If used properly, this may allow for long-lasting innovativeness and competitive advantage. Therefore, companies shift “from innovation initiatives that are centered on internal resources to those that are centered on external networks“. We therefore face a shift “[…] from innovation that is firm-centric one that is networking-centric.”

=== Inbound Open Innovation and Importance of Absorptive Capacity ===
In fact, the effective and efficient usage of external knowledge is more complex than obvious on first glance. External knowledge does not percolate smoothly through the boundaries of the firm. More likely, knowledge that is stemming from external sources has to be, first of all, identified to be relevant, then brought into appropriate context and in the end actually be used. In fact, whether the firm is able to take advantage of inbound open innovation depends largely on absorptive capacity. According to Cohen and Levinthal, the concept of absorptive capacity is critical to the innovativeness of a firm. It is a three-step capability consisting of the following: Firstly, the ability to recognize new knowledge and technologies outside the own firm boundaries and to recognize their relevant value for own purposes. Secondly the ability to assimilate them and, finally, the ability to apply them to commercial ends. In short: Absorptive capacity is the ability to appropriate external knowledge. Understanding absorptive capacity, therefore, is the key to understanding the concept of inbound open innovation. Even if there are different views existing, the definition of Cohen and Levinthal can be taken as a frame for the concept of absorptive capacity.

According to Spithoven et al. (2011), absorptive capacity at the firm-level can be generated in various ways. Three main ways for an organization to do so, are:

1. Investing in in-house R&D
2. By-product of manufacturing operations
3. sending personnel to advanced technical training

A critical factor, therefore, is the communication at the inter-organizational level.

=== Activities of Technology Intermediaries ===
Understanding that absorptive capacity does not necessarily have to take place within merely the firm-level, but can happen at the inter-organizational level, raises the question of the type of roles technology intermediaries may play. The following three main interrelated activities of collective research centers have been named by their CEOs to increase innovative capacity of the network members:

1. Technology intermediaries act as knowledge intelligence units. As research centers are highly innovative and collective by nature, monitoring external technological developments through, for instance, technology watch activities and technology road-mapping is one of their main tasks. Acting in a gatekeeping or pushing manner they identify and monitor the relevant technology and knowledge. This relates to the already mentioned feature of recognizing new and valuable knowledge and technologies in the context of absorptive capacity
2. They act as knowledge agencies. Members can suggest in a proactive way research projects to the research centers. On demand of their members, the intermediaries tackle encountered problems and, furthermore, implement technologies. Besides doing the research, intermediaries also often provide members with necessary contact to engage in R&D collaboration with other third parties. This second activity belongs to the assimilation and transformation capability of absorptive capacity.
3. They act as repository of knowledge. This activity is directed to the dissemination of information among the network of members. By deploying tools, such as technical libraries, and making them available for their network, they enhance the assimilation capabilities of the members. This allows the organization of absorptive capacity at a collective level.

The large fraction of R&D-related activities within research centers, in comparison to the proportion of pure R&D-activities, proofs the importance of their roles. Their activities do not substitute in house R&D of the member firms, but are directed at complementing them with otherwise too expensive R&D-related activities. Furthermore, collective research centers specifically absorb knowledge that does not transfer easily from science to industry. Their own high R&D activity intensity enables them to absorb very specialized knowledge and transfer it to their members in ways that lead to easier applicable information.

Howells points out various functions of intermediaries. These include to foresight, doing diagnostic work and scan information but also process information and knowledge. They may act as a gatekeeper or broker as well. A further part of their functions may be to take care of testing, regulation and validation, do the accreditation process and furthermore protect the results. Besides they may deal with the commercialization and the evaluation of potential outcomes. Of course it depends on the respective intermediary, if they are involved or not involved in specific functions.

== The role of Technology Intermediaries for SMEs in traditional and low tech sectors ==
The respective environment of technology intermediaries is the industry in which they operate. Technology transfer intermediaries can help overcome the barriers to commercialization by mediating between inventors, developers and marketers. According to Spithoven, similarities between and differences across sectors and industries are existing because of differences in the ability to build absorptive capacity. Many studies examined the concepts of open innovation and absorptive capacity in large enterprises with a high level of R&D. If absorptive capacity within a firm is developed by the before mentioned activities, how can companies, that are lacking the resources to execute those activities in the appropriate manner, participate successfully in the inbound open innovation process?

This becomes especially relevant for companies operating in the traditional sector as it generally meets the following characteristics:

- Presence of SMEs
- Limited research and development intensity
- Limited innovative capacity
- Number and qualification of employees below critical mass necessary to engage in open innovation through absorptive capacity.

Those characteristics easily reveal the inherent problem: Firms of traditional sectors, generally speaking, lack the resources to participate sufficiently in activities that enhance or develop absorptive capacity. SMEs in low tech sectors are confronted with a rather similar problem, namely a low level of absorptive capacity because of their limited R&D and innovation capacity. Moreover, “innovation in SMEs is hampered by lack of financial resources, scant opportunities to recruit specialized workers, and small innovation portfolios so that risks associated with innovation cannot be spread. SMEs need to heavily draw on their networks to find missing innovation resources, and due to their smallness, they will be confronted with the boundaries of their organizations rather sooner than later”. These are crucial issues for their innovativeness and future competitiveness regarding their participation in the open innovation process.

Hence, for this type of industry, technology intermediaries are potential ways to overcome the lack of business, financing and marketing expertise. They can help SMEs in traditional and low tech sectors in improving their ability to scan the market for technology and furthermore to absorb the acquired knowledge and technology. For instance, the “collective research centers” of Belgium are doing knowledge absorption and diffusion in their role as technology intermediaries. The member companies are lacking qualified personnel and the necessary technological information to absorb knowledge. Therefore, one of the main activities of the collective research centers is building R&D capacity and offering technology transfer services. “Through these activities, they help members build absorptive capacity, that will enable them to scan the market for technology and absorb technology from the environment.”
