= Institute of Research and Technology b-com =

French research institution

Coordinates: 48.1360°N 1.6234°W

The Institute of Research and Technology (French: Institut de Recherche Technologique b-com), stylized and known as, is one of eight Institutes of Research and Technology endorsed by the French government in 2012. b<>com is a technology pioneer and provider for companies that want to digitally boost their competitive edge. b<>com is chaired by Vincent Marcatté, who is also President of the Images & Réseaux business cluster and Vice President of Open Innovation at Orange Labs. The main campus is based in Rennes in the Via Silva neighbourhood of Cesson-Sévigné. Secondary sites are located in Brest, Lannion, and since September 2016, Paris is a member of the French Institutes of Technology (FIT), which encompasses the eight French IRTs. b<>com has 330 employees.

== History ==
b<>com was created in May 2012. Certified by the Images & Réseaux business cluster, it reached an agreement with the Agence Nationale de Recherche, signed in October 2012. It received a 7-year budget of €160 million drawn from the French government's Investissements d’Avenir investment fund.

== Research ==
b<>com's research fields include artificial intelligence, immersive video, audio, content protection, 5G networks, the Internet of Things, and cognitive technologies. It has six labs: Immersive & Medical Technologies, Advanced Media Content, Human Factors Technologies, Artificial Intelligence, Advanced Connectivity, and Trust & Security.

Since December 2020, b<>com carries the *xG* initiative, a sovereign technology strategy for private digital infrastructure, 5G and beyond. The initiative is supported by the State, the Brittany region and Lannion Tregor Communauté.

== Members ==
b<>com includes 27 shareholders: Airbus Defence & Space, Artefacto, Aviwest, BBright, CHU de Rennes, CHRU de Brest, Ekinops, Enensys, ENIB, ENSTA Bretagne, EXFO, Harmonic Inc., Human Design Group, INRIA, INSA Rennes, IMT Atlantique, Kerlink, Mitsubishi Electric Corporation, Naval Group, Orange, Rennes School of Business, Secure-IC, TDF, Université de Bretagne Occidentale, Université de Rennes 1 and Viaccess-Orca.

== Award ==
- NAB Show "Product of the Year" for its [HDR-SDR] converter (2019)
- NAB Show Technology Innovation Award for the best technical contributions to the world of broadcasting (2017)

== Spin-off ==
In June, 2018, Green Hill Studio became the first spin-off from a b-com R&D project. It is dedicated to the development of virtual reality experiences.
