= Closed innovation =

Before being open, innovation happened in closed environments often performed by individuals, scientists or employees. However, the expression closed innovation was coined later and not before the paradigm of open innovation became popular by works of Henry Chesbrough and Don Tapscott et Anthony D. Williams

Closed innovation was described in March 2003 by Henry Chesbrough, a professor and executive director at the Center for Open Innovation at UC Berkeley, in his book Open Innovation: The new imperative for creating and profiting from technology. The concept is related to user innovation, know-how trading and mass innovation and subject of recent research projects

== Origin ==
The paradigm of closed innovation says that successful innovation requires control and ownership of the Intellectual property (IP). A company should control the creation and management of ideas. Roots of closed innovation go back to the beginning of the twentieth century when universities and governments were not involved in the commercial application of science. Some companies therefore decided to run their own research and development units. The entire new product development (NPD) cycle was then integrated within the company where innovation was performed in a "closed" and self-sufficient way.

The period between the end of World War II and the mid-1980s was the era of closed innovation and internal R&D. Many R&D departments of private companies were at the leading edge of scientific research. The setup of internal R&D was perceived as a strong barrier for potential new competitors, as large investments had to be made to be able to compete

Often, closed innovation paradigms are set equal to the “Not Invented Here” syndrome sometimes referred to by decision makers: everything coming from outside is suspicious and not reliable. However, there are ongoing research projects and emerging companies that investigate the pros and cons of closed innovation versus open innovation.

== Comparison with open innovation ==
Closed Innovation Principles	Open Innovation Principles
The smart people in the field work for us.	Not all the smart people in the field work for us. We need to work with smart people inside and outside the company.
To profit from R&D, we must discover it, develop it, and ship it ourselves.	External R&D can create significant value: internal R&D is needed to claim some portion of that value.
If we discover it ourselves, we will get it to the market first.	We don't have to originate the research to profit from it.
If we create the most and the best ideas in the industry, we will win.	If we make the best use of internal and external ideas, we will win.
We should control our IP, so that our competitors don't profit from our ideas.	We should profit from others' use of our IP, and we should buy others' IP whenever it advances our business model.

adapted from

== Towards open innovation ==
In the 29th Information Systems Research Conference in Scandinavia in 2006 the transition path from closed innovation to open innovation was formally described. As a result, it was found that when seeking to increase customer loyalty and attracting new customers, companies needed to increase customer involvement in research and design (R&D) operation. Brokering and social networking processes lie at the heart of the open innovation paradigm. The technology brokering process model by Hargadon and Sutton (1997) describes the shift towards open innovation.
