= Registered Intermediary =

A Registered Intermediary, in England and Wales, assists in communication between lawyers and vulnerable witnesses in court cases. Many people attending court as victims or witnesses have difficulties understanding the questions that they are asked by lawyers. Registered Intermediaries have professional backgrounds in areas such as speech and language therapy, social work, nursing, occupational therapy, education, or psychology.

They are also available to assist police officers who are interviewing vulnerable witnesses. In all cases, the intermediary completes a comprehensive assessment of the vulnerable person's communication needs and makes recommendations in a written report of how the person should be questioned.

Registered Intermediaries are not appropriate adults or expert witnesses whilst undertaking this role.

A new scheme was piloted in Northern Ireland in 2013 in which vulnerable suspects and defendants at court are also able to access a Registered Intermediary.

In England and Wales, legislation has been passed (but not yet implemented) to enable vulnerable defendants to access an Intermediary while they give oral testimony at court. However, in the meantime in the interest of justice, the Criminal Practice Directions (2013) allow the court the discretion to appoint an intermediary for a vulnerable defendant. The two largest providers of intermediaries for defendants in the criminal and family courts are Communicourt and Triangle.

Intermediaries for Justice (IfJ) is a registered charity with a vision of opening the ‘accessible door’ to justice; where all people understand the questions they are asked and can tell what has happened. IfJ promotes and supports the work of intermediaries, who are communication specialists working with vulnerable people in the justice system. It also provides a search for an intermediary facility at https://www.intermediaries-for-justice.org
