= Cleeve School =

Location
- Two Hedges Road; Bishop's Cleeve, Gloucestershire, GL52 8AE; England; 51°56′29″N 2°03′20″W

Information
- Type: Academy
- Motto: 'A.C.T' (Aspiring, collaborating, Transforming)
- Religious affiliation: N/A
- Established: 1968
- Department for Education URN: 136772 Tables
- Ofsted: Reports
- Executive Head: Alwyn Richards
- Gender: Mixed
- Age: 11 to 18
- Enrolment: 2,148
- Houses: Rowling, Shackleton, Attenborough, Holmes and Nightingale
- Colours: White, cyan, dark blue and light blue
- Website: www.cleeveschool.net

Cleeve School is an academy school and a Leadership Partner School. It was formerly a comprehensive school and is located in the village of Bishop's Cleeve, Gloucestershire, England. Headteacher Alwyn Richards leads the senior management team at the approximately 2,100-pupil school. The school offers GCSEs for ages 11 to 16, and A-Levels/BTECs for students wishing to go to the sixth form at ages 16 to 18.

== Sports and activities ==
The school's astronomy club acquired a refractor telescope which was donated by the Society for Popular Astronomy as part of the Telescopes For Schools project.

The school is one of three in the county forming the Cyber Schools Hub, in conjunction with the National Cyber Security Centre which brings benefits to students in the form of access to industry practitioners and a self contained Hack Lab for practical experiments in cyber security.

Throughout the academic year, the school hosts a variety Inter-College events for students to take part in, such as Music, Drama, Dance and its highlight event of the year - Sports Day.

== Buildings ==
In 1980's, following the accidental drowning of a 13 year old girl, who got admitted to hospital but survived, Cleeve School was forced to close its swimming facility. Shortly after this, there was a new building, opening a few years later- containing a staff room, a hall, student reception and toilets, which was also the location of the Sixth Form Centre

In 2001, the school requested funding to 'rebuild' the school. Their plans later got rejected, which led to another request a year later. As this got declined, the school had to come up with other ways to fundraise money for the redevelopment of the school.

Soon after, the school had raised enough money to build a new art department, and refurbish the PE department. This brought new art classrooms, a new art gallery, and additions to the PE department, such as new changing rooms. This officially opened up in January 2004. Soon after, construction of a new sixth form centre began, officially opening on 10 May 2005. During this, the school refurbished the old sixth form centre- turning it into a cafeteria. Around this time, the school received money for a new drama centre- opening in the same year.

In 2006, the Geography and History department was demolished, to make way for a new building for Science, IT, Music and Learning Skills departments. During this demolition, Geography and History had to temporarily move, until they had refurbished the old science block. The construction was completed in July 2008, opening to students in September 2008.

The new Sixth Form Development opened for Year 12 and Year 13 students in September 2018. The £5 million development serves as the school's new "Sixth Form Centre of Excellence", while the refurbished sixth form is used as a new Year 11 centre. This facility provides for over 300 Sixth Form students and comprises a lecture theatre, seminar rooms, quiet study areas, a common room, exhibition space, and a small café area.

Recently, a new cafeteria area called Bistro opened and it has 2 sides to it, 1 for year 11 and 1 for year 10, alongside the other cafeteria Bon Appetite. With the completion of Bistro, Bon Appetite was also refurbished. Each cafeteria is used by certain year groups, to minimise queueing.

In May 2021, work started on a new Teacher Training Hub, which opened in September 2021. The new facility is used for teacher training as well as English and Maths classes.

In Spring 2026, the school organised a fundraising campaign, to raise money for a new all weather football pitch on the school field. The facility’s construction was completed following the 2026 school year in august.

== Notable alumni ==
- Peter Buxton, Rugby player, who played flanker previously for Gloucester Rugby.
- Rebecca Pantaney, Commonwealth Badminton gold medallist
- Nick Ponting – former English badminton player who represented Great Britain at the 1992 and 1996 Summer Olympics and won the 1994 All England Open mixed doubles title.
- Rosemary West, serial killer
