= Peter Buxton =

England international rugby union player

- Born: Peter Buxton; 21 August 1978 (age 48) Cheltenham, England
- Height: 1.93 m (6 ft 4 in)
- Weight: 115 kg (18 st 2 lb)
- School: Cleeve School

Rugby union career
- Position: Flanker
Youth career
- -: Cheltenham RFC
- 1997-2000: Moseley
Senior career
Years	Team	Apps	(Points)
2001-2002	Newport RFC		
2002-2013	Gloucester Rugby	273	(40)
- Correct as of 10 July 2014
International career
Years	Team	Apps	(Points)
- England Counties
–	England		
- Correct as of 10 July 2014

Peter Buxton (born 21 August 1978, in Cheltenham) is a former rugby union footballer who played flanker for Gloucester Rugby.

Buxton signed for Gloucester Rugby from Newport RFC in 2002. He has gone on to make many appearances for the club and has captained the side on many occasions. Buxton was part of the Gloucester teams that topped the table in the 2002/03, 2006/07 and 2007/08 seasons. He also helped Gloucester win the Powergen Cup in 2003 and he captained Gloucester to victory over London Irish in the European Challenge Cup victory in 2006. Buxton has scored 7 tries in 189 appearances for Gloucester, this includes a brace of tries against Bristol in the 08/09 season. After 11 years playing for Gloucester Rugby, it was announced Buxton was leaving at the end of this season to join Championship side Bristol Rugby for 2013/14 season. However, Buxton officially announced his retirement from rugby, effectively leaving Bristol to return to Gloucester to become their new Senior Academy Manager.

Buxton was named among the replacements for England's clash with the Barbarians in 2004 and picked for England's summer tour to South Africa in 2007, but had to withdraw after breaking his hand in Gloucester's Premiership final defeat to Leicester.
