= Emily Watson =

English actress (born 1967)

Emily Watson OBE
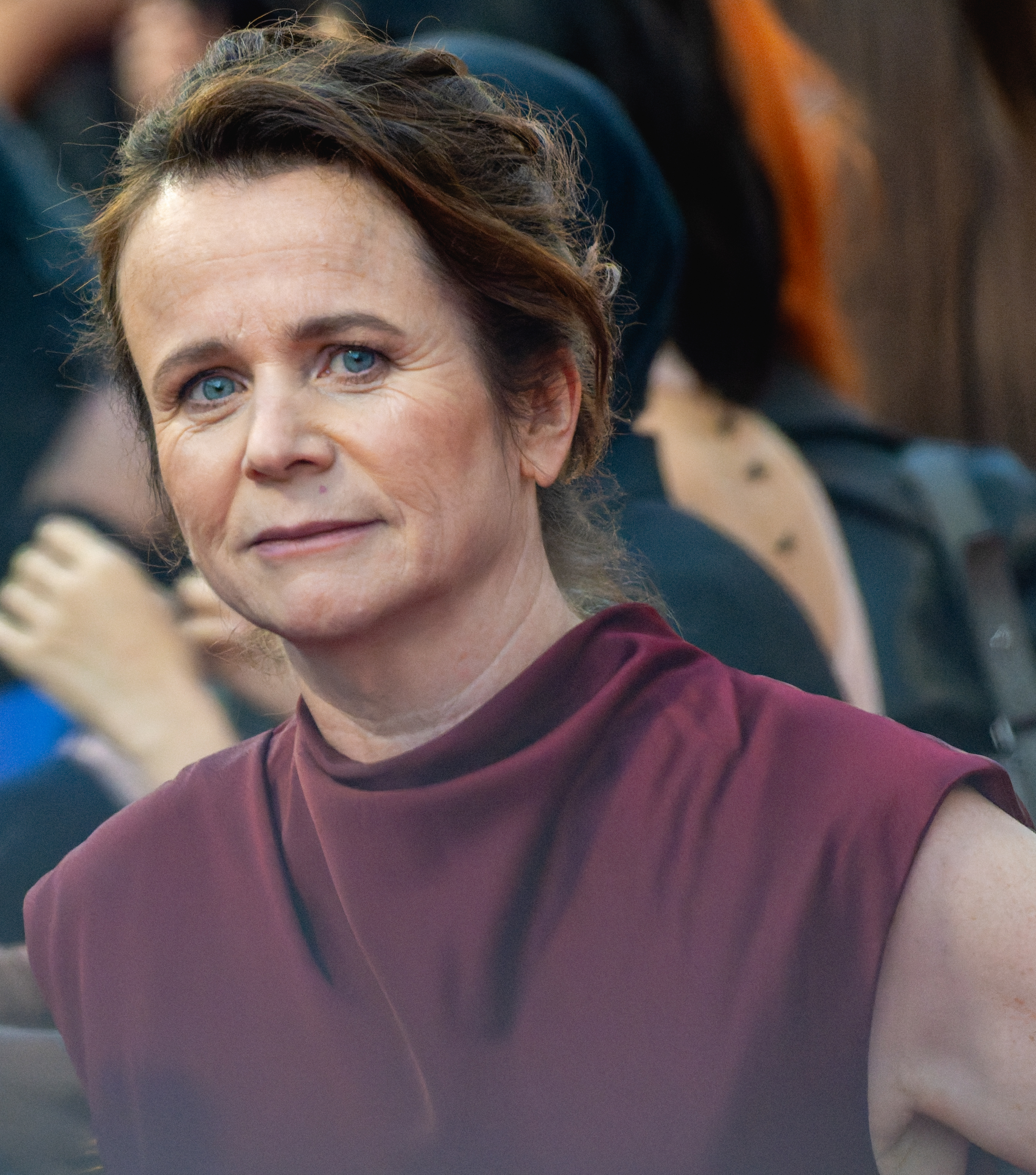
- Watson in 2025
- Born: Emily Margaret Watson; 14 January 1967 (age 59); Islington, London, England
- Education: University of Bristol; Drama Studio London
- Occupation: Actress
- Years active: 1992–present
- Spouse: Jack Waters (m. 1995)
- Children: 2

Emily Margaret Watson (born 14 January 1967) is an English actress. She began her career on stage and joined the Royal Shakespeare Company in 1992. In 2002, she starred in productions of Twelfth Night and Uncle Vanya at the Donmar Warehouse, and was nominated for the Olivier Award for Best Actress for the latter. She was nominated for the Academy Award for Best Actress for her debut film role as a newlywed in Lars von Trier's Breaking the Waves (1996) and for her portrayal of Jacqueline du Pré in Anand Tucker's Hilary and Jackie (1998).

Watson's other films include The Boxer (1997), Angela's Ashes (1999), Gosford Park (2001), Punch-Drunk Love (2002), Red Dragon (2002), The Life and Death of Peter Sellers (2004), Corpse Bride (2005), Miss Potter (2006), Synecdoche, New York (2008), Oranges and Sunshine (2010), War Horse (2011), The Theory of Everything (2014), Kingsman: The Golden Circle (2017), God's Creatures (2022), Small Things like These (2024), and Hamnet (2025).

For her role in the HBO miniseries Chernobyl, she was nominated for a Primetime Emmy Award and a Golden Globe Award. She won the British Academy Television Award for Best Actress for playing Janet Leach in the 2011 ITV television biopic Appropriate Adult and was nominated for the International Emmy Award for Best Actress for the 2017 BBC miniseries Apple Tree Yard. In 2024, she portrayed the lead role of Valya Harkonnen in the HBO science fiction series Dune: Prophecy.

== Early life ==
Watson was born 14 January 1967 in London. Her father, Richard Watson, was an architect, and her mother, Katharine (née Venables), was an English teacher at St David's Girls' School, west London. She has an older sister, Harriet. Watson was brought up as an Anglican. She has described her childhood self as "a nice middle-class English girl ... I'd love to say I was a rebellious teenager, but I wasn't." She is a childhood friend of actress and writer Clara Salaman, and starred in the screen adaptation of Salaman's novel Too Close.

Watson was educated at St James Independent Schools in west London which were founded by the School of Economic Science. While there, she witnessed "incidents of extreme cruelty" that were "very scarring for people going forward in their lives". She attended the University of Bristol, where she obtained a BA (1988, English). Watson subsequently trained at Drama Studio London. In 2003, she received an honorary MA from Bristol University. Watson was a member of the School of Economic Science until 1996, when aged 29 she was expelled following her part in Breaking the Waves. She describes the organisation as a "very repressive regime" and a "system where you were supposed to think a certain way and you weren't really allowed to think any other way". Breaking out of it, she says, was a "very powerful release" in her life.

== Career ==
Watson's career began on the stage. Her theatre credits include The Children's Hour (at the Royal National Theatre), Three Sisters, Much Ado About Nothing and The Lady from the Sea. Watson has also worked with the Royal Shakespeare Company in A Jovial Crew, The Taming of the Shrew, All's Well That Ends Well and The Changeling.

Watson was virtually unknown until director Lars von Trier chose her to star in Breaking the Waves (1996) after Helena Bonham Carter dropped out. Watson's performance as Bess McNeill won her the Los Angeles, London and New York Critics' Circle Awards for Best Actress, as well as the US National Society of Film Critics' Award for Best Actress and nominations at the Academy Awards, the British Academy Film Awards, and the Golden Globe Awards.

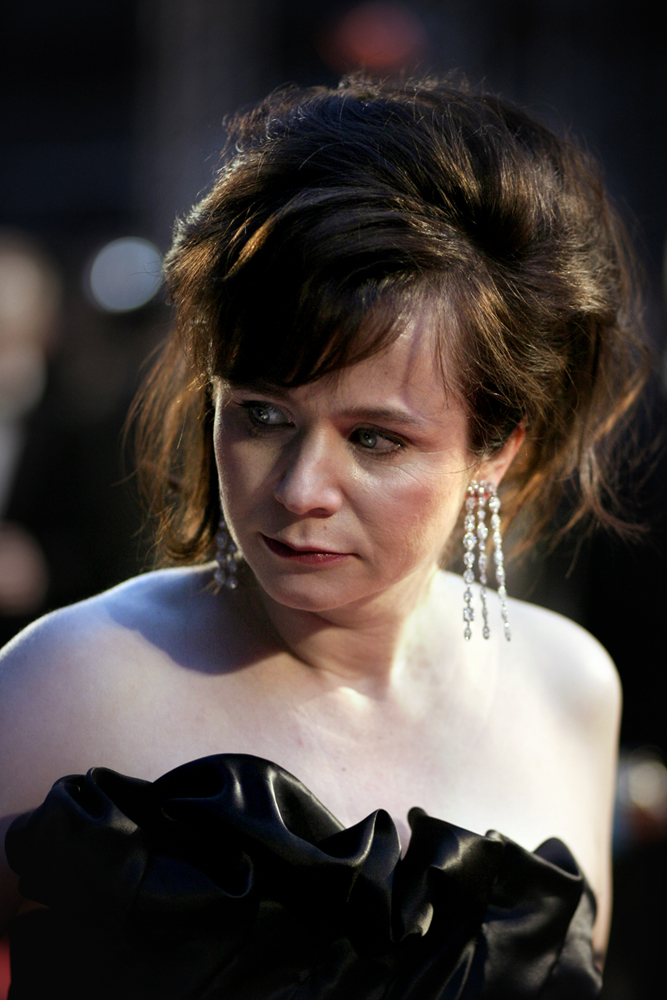
Watson at the British Academy Film Awards in the Royal Opera House, February 2007

Watson came to public notice again in another role, that of cellist Jacqueline du Pré in Hilary and Jackie, for which she learned to play the cello in three months, and received another Oscar nomination. She also played a leading role in Cradle Will Rock, a story of a theatre show in the 1930s, directed by Tim Robbins. She played the title role of Frank McCourt's mother in the adaptation of his memoir, Angela's Ashes. In 2001, she appeared with John Turturro in The Luzhin Defence and in Robert Altman's ensemble piece Gosford Park.

Director Jean-Pierre Jeunet wrote the character Amélie for Watson to play (Amélie was originally named Emily) but she eventually turned the role down due to difficulties speaking French and a desire not to be away from home. The role made a star of Audrey Tautou. She was also the first choice to play Elizabeth I in Shekhar Kapur's film Elizabeth, the role that won Cate Blanchett an Academy Award nomination.

The following year, she starred as Reba McClane in Red Dragon, an adaptation of Thomas Harris's The Silence of the Lambs prequel, as the romantic interest of Adam Sandler in Paul Thomas Anderson's Punch-Drunk Love and in the sci-fi action thriller Equilibrium with Christian Bale. In 2002, she took time off from cinema to play two roles in Sam Mendes's repertory productions of Uncle Vanya and Twelfth Night, first at Mendes's Donmar Warehouse in London and later at the Brooklyn Academy of Music. Her performance was widely acclaimed on both sides of the Atlantic and she was nominated for an Olivier Award for Uncle Vanya.

In 2004, Watson received a Golden Globe nomination for her performance as Peter Sellers's first wife, Anne Howe, in the HBO film The Life and Death of Peter Sellers. 2005 saw Watson star in four films: Wah-Wah, Richard E. Grant's autobiographical directorial debut; Separate Lies, directed by Gosford Park writer Julian Fellowes; Tim Burton's animated film Corpse Bride, with Johnny Depp and Helena Bonham Carter; and John Hillcoat's Australian Western, The Proposition.

In 2006, Watson took a supporting role in Miss Potter, a biographical drama about children's author Beatrix Potter, from Babe director Chris Noonan, with Ewan McGregor and Renée Zellweger; and also in an adaptation of Thea Beckman's children's novel Crusade in Jeans. In 2007, she appeared in The Water Horse: Legend of the Deep, an adaptation of the Dick King-Smith children's novel about the origin of the Loch Ness Monster. In 2007, Mood Indigo, a script written by Watson and her husband, was optioned by Capitol Films. The film is a love story set during the Second World War and concerns a young woman who falls in love with a pilot.

In 2008, Watson starred with Julia Roberts and Carrie-Anne Moss in Fireflies in the Garden, the Lifetime Television movie The Memory Keeper's Daughter (based on the novel with the same name), and in screenwriter Charlie Kaufman's directorial debut, Synecdoche, New York. In 2009 she appeared in the film Cold Souls, from first-time director Sophie Barthes, and Within the Whirlwind, a biographical film of Russian poet and Gulag survivor Evgenia Ginzburg from The Luzhin Defence director Marleen Gorris. Watson considers her performance in the role of Ginzburg "the most stretching thing I've done as a mature actress"; however, the film was not picked up for distribution.

In 2010, she starred in Oranges and Sunshine, a film recounting the true story of children sent into abusive care homes in Australia, directed by Jim Loach, and also the following year (2011) in War Horse, an adaptation of Michael Morpurgo's prizewinning novel, directed by Steven Spielberg. In 2011, she played Janet Leach in the ITV two-part film Appropriate Adult, about serial killer Fred West, for which she won a BAFTA.

In 2014, Watson had supporting roles in The Book Thief, alongside Geoffrey Rush and Sophie Nélisse, and the Oscar-nominated film The Theory of Everything, portraying Jane Wilde, Hawking's mother in law, alongside Eddie Redmayne and Felicity Jones. In 2015, she had supporting roles in Testament of Youth, alongside Alicia Vikander and Kit Harington, Eduardo Verástegui's Little Boy and A Royal Night Out, in which she portrayed Queen Elizabeth The Queen Mother. She also received rave reviews for her portrayal of Julie Nicholson in the BBC Drama A Song for Jenny, with experts tipping her to win the British Academy Television Award for Best Actress.

In 2019 she appeared as a nuclear scientist — a composite of several real scientists — in the miniseries Chernobyl.

Watson was appointed Officer of the Order of the British Empire (OBE) in the 2015 New Year Honours for services to drama. In 2017, she starred in the BBC mini-series Apple Tree Yard.

== Personal life ==
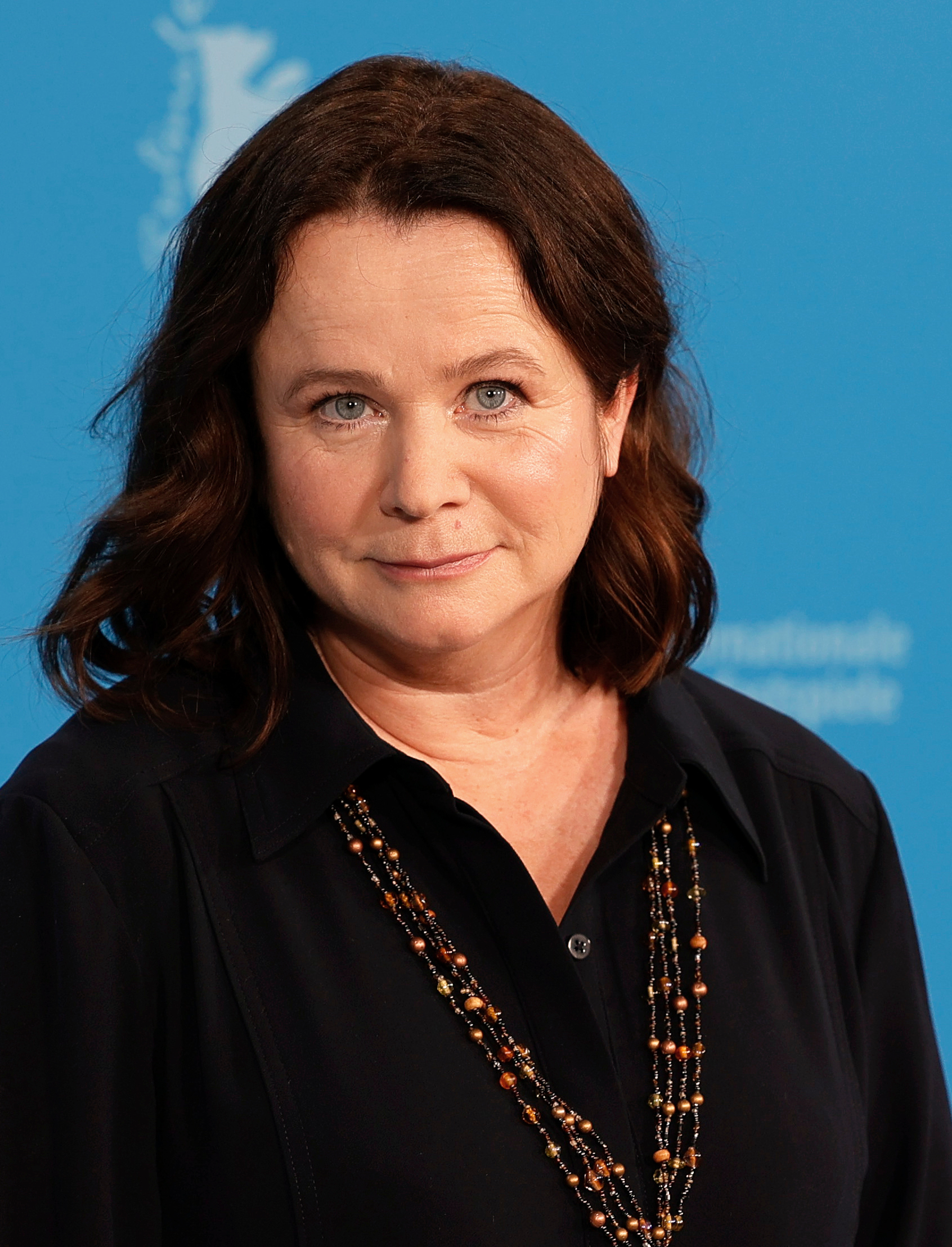
Watson in 2024

Watson married Jack Waters in 1995, whom she had met on a bus while working at the Royal Shakespeare Company. Waters is a former actor who now works as a potter. They have a daughter born in 2005, and a son in 2009. They live in Greenwich, London.

Watson is a supporter of the children's charity the NSPCC. In 2004, she was inducted into the society's hall of fame for spearheading the successful campaign to appoint a Children's Commissioner for England. Receiving her award in the crowded House of Commons, she spoke out against the possibility that the Children's Commissioner become a figurehead with little real power. She is also one of the patrons of the London children's charity Scene & Heard. In April 2018, Watson presented Maternity Worldwide as her chosen charity on the BBC Radio 4 Appeal.

In May 2026 Watson was the guest for BBC Radio 4's Desert Island Discs.

== Filmography ==
=== Film ===
Year	Title	Role	Notes
1996	Breaking the Waves	Bess McNeill	
1997	Metroland	Marion	
1997	The Boxer	Maggie	
1998	Hilary and Jackie	Jacqueline du Pré	
1999	Cradle Will Rock	Olive Stanton	
1999	Angela's Ashes	Angela McCourt	
2000	Trixie	Trixie Zurbo	
2000	The Luzhin Defence	Natalia Katkov	
2001	Gosford Park	Elsie	
2002	Punch-Drunk Love	Lena Leonard	
2002	Red Dragon	Reba McClane	
2002	Equilibrium	Mary O'Brien	
2004	Boo, Zino & the Snurks	Atlanta	Voice role
2004	The Life and Death of Peter Sellers	Anne Sellers	
2005	Separate Lies	Anne Manning	
2005	Wah-Wah	Ruby Compton	
2005	Corpse Bride	Victoria Everglot	Voice role
2005	The Proposition	Martha Stanley	
2006	Miss Potter	Amelia "Millie" Warne	
2006	Crusade in Jeans	Mary Vega	
2007	The Water Horse: Legend of the Deep	Anne MacMorrow	
2008	Fireflies in the Garden	Adult Jane Lawrence	
2008	Synecdoche, New York	Tammy	
2009	Cold Souls	Claire	
2009	Within the Whirlwind	Evgenia Ginzburg	
2010	Cemetery Junction	Mrs. Kendrick	
2011	Oranges and Sunshine	Margaret Humphreys	
2011	War Horse	Rose Narracott	
2012	Anna Karenina	Countess Lydia	
2013	Some Girl(s)	Lindsay	
2013	The Book Thief	Rosa Hubermann	
2013	Belle	Lady Mansfield	
2014	The Theory of Everything	Beryl Wilde	
2014	Testament of Youth	Mrs. Brittain	
2015	Little Boy	Emma Busbee	
2015	A Royal Night Out	Queen Elizabeth	
2015	Everest	Helen Wilton	
2015	Molly Moon and the Incredible Book of Hypnotism	Miss Trinklebury	
2017	Kingsman: The Golden Circle	White House Chief of Staff Fox	
2017	On Chesil Beach	Violet Ponting	
2017	Monster Family	Emma Wishbone	Voice role
2018	The Happy Prince	Constance Lloyd	
2021	Monster Family 2	Emma Wishbone	Voice role
2022	God's Creatures	Aileen O'Hara	
2024	Small Things Like These	Sister Mary	
2024	Midas Man	Malka Epstein	
2025	The Legend of Ochi	Dasha	
2025	Steve	Jenny	
2025	Hamnet	Mary Shakespeare	
2027	Amri	Marie Antoinette Gottesman	Post-production

=== Television ===
Year	Title	Role	Notes
1994	A Summer Day's Dream	Rosalie	Television film
1997	The Mill on the Floss	Maggie Tulliver	Television film
2008	The Memory Keeper's Daughter	Caroline Gil	Television film
2011	Appropriate Adult	Janet Leach	2 episodes
2013	The Politician's Husband	Freya	3 episodes
2015	The Secret Life of Marilyn Monroe	Grace McKee	2 episodes
2015	A Song for Jenny	Julie Nicholson	Television film
2015	The Dresser	Her Ladyship	Television film
2017	Apple Tree Yard	Yvonne Carmichael	4 episodes
2017	Genius	Elsa Einstein	4 episodes
2017	Little Women	Marmee	3 episodes
2018	King Lear	Regan	Television film
2019	Chernobyl	Ulana Khomyuk	4 episodes
2020	The Third Day	Mrs. Martin	6 episodes
2021	Too Close	Dr. Emma Robertson	3 episodes
2024	Dune: Prophecy	Valya Harkonnen	Lead role

=== Theatre ===
- School for Mothers and The Mistake (double-bill of one-act plays), White Bear Theatre, London, 1991
- All's Well That Ends Well (Royal Shakespeare Company, Swan Theatre, Stratford-upon-Avon 1992, later Pit Theatre, London, 1993) as Marianna
- The Taming of the Shrew (Royal Shakespeare Company, Barbican Theatre, London, 1993) as Mrs. Ruth Banks-Ellis
- The Changeling (Royal Shakespeare Company, Pit Theatre, 1993)
- A Jovial Crew (Royal Shakespeare Company, Pit Theatre, 1993) as Amie
- The Lady from the Sea (Lyric Theatre, London, 1994) as Hilde Wangel
- The Children's Hour (Royal National Theatre, London, 1994) as Mary Tilford
- Three Sisters (Out of Joint, 1995)
- Othello (1996, theatre)
- Twelfth Night / Uncle Vanya (Donmar Warehouse, 2002 / BAM, 2003)

=== Radio ===
- The Wolves of Willoughby Chase (1994, radio)
- Wuthering Heights (1995, radio series)
- The Glass Piano (2010, radio drama about Princess Alexandra of Bavaria)

== Awards and nominations ==
Year	Title	Award	Result
1996	Breaking the Waves	Bodil Award for Best Actress	Won
1996	Breaking the Waves	European Film Award for Best Actress	Won
1996	Breaking the Waves	Evening Standard British Film Award for Most Promising Newcomer	Won
1996	Breaking the Waves	Fort Lauderdale International Film Festival President Award for Best Actress	Won
1996	Breaking the Waves	London Film Critics' Award for Best British Newcomer of the Year	Won
1996	Breaking the Waves	Los Angeles Film Critics Association's New Generation Award	Won
1996	Breaking the Waves	National Society of Film Critics Award for Best Actress	Won
1996	Breaking the Waves	New York Film Critics Circle Award for Best Actress	Won
1996	Breaking the Waves	Robert Award for Best Actress	Won
1996	Breaking the Waves	Academy Award for Best Actress	Nominated
1996	Breaking the Waves	BAFTA Award for Best Actress in a Leading Role	Nominated
1996	Breaking the Waves	Chicago Film Critics Association Award for Best Actress	Nominated
1996	Breaking the Waves	Chicago Film Critics Association Award for Most Promising Actress	Nominated
1996	Breaking the Waves	Golden Globe Award for Best Actress in a Motion Picture – Drama	Nominated
1996	Breaking the Waves	London Film Critics' Circle Award for British Actress of the Year	Nominated
1996	Breaking the Waves	Satellite Award for Best Actress in a Motion Picture – Drama	Nominated
1998	Hilary and Jackie	British Independent Film Award for Best Actress	Won
1998	Hilary and Jackie	London Film Critics' Circle Award for British Actress of the Year (also for Angela's Ashes)	Won
1998	Hilary and Jackie	Academy Award for Best Actress	Nominated
1998	Hilary and Jackie	BAFTA Award for Best Actress in a Leading Role	Nominated
1998	Hilary and Jackie	Chicago Film Critics Association Award for Best Actress	Nominated
1998	Hilary and Jackie	Golden Globe Award for Best Actress in a Motion Picture – Drama	Nominated
1998	Hilary and Jackie	Online Film Critics Society Award for Best Actress	Nominated
1998	Hilary and Jackie	Satellite Award for Best Actress in a Motion Picture – Drama	Nominated
1998	Hilary and Jackie	Screen Actors Guild Award for Outstanding Performance by a Female Actor in a Leading Role	Nominated
1999	Cradle Will Rock	London Film Critics' Circle Award for British Supporting Actress of the Year	Nominated
1999	Angela's Ashes	London Film Critics' Circle Award for British Actress of the Year (also for Hilary and Jackie)	Won
1999	Angela's Ashes	BAFTA Award for Best Actress in a Leading Role	Nominated
1999	Angela's Ashes	IFTA Award for Best Actress	Nominated
2000	The Luzhin Defence	British Independent Film Award for Best Actress	Nominated
2000	The Luzhin Defence	London Film Critics' Circle Award for British Actress of the Year	Nominated
2001	Gosford Park	Broadcast Film Critics Association Award for Best Cast	Won
2001	Gosford Park	Florida Film Critics Circle Award for Best Cast	Won
2001	Gosford Park	Online Film Critics Society Award for Best Cast	Won
2001	Gosford Park	Satellite Award for Best Cast – Motion Picture	Won
2001	Gosford Park	Screen Actors Guild Award for Outstanding Performance by a Cast in a Motion Picture	Won
2001	Gosford Park	European Film Awards Audience Award for Best Actress	Nominated
2001	Gosford Park	Phoenix Film Critics Society Award for Best Cast	Nominated
2001	Gosford Park	Satellite Award for Best Actress in a Motion Picture – Musical or Comedy	Nominated
2002	Punch-Drunk Love	Toronto Film Critics Association Award for Best Supporting Actress	Won
2002	Punch-Drunk Love	MTV Movie Award for Best Kiss (shared with Adam Sandler)	Nominated
2002	Punch-Drunk Love	Vancouver Film Critics Circle Award for Best Supporting Actress	Nominated
2002	Red Dragon	Fangoria Chainsaw Award for Best Supporting Actress (2nd place)	Won
2002	Red Dragon	London Film Critics' Circle Award for British Supporting Actress of the Year	Won
2002	Red Dragon	Saturn Award for Best Supporting Actress	Nominated
2002	Red Dragon	Empire Award for Best Actress	Nominated
2003	Uncle Vanya	Laurence Olivier Award for Best Actress	Nominated
2004	The Life and Death of Peter Sellers	Golden Globe Award for Best Supporting Actress – Series, Miniseries or Television Film	Nominated
2004	The Life and Death of Peter Sellers	Satellite Award for Best Supporting Actress – Series, Miniseries or Television Film	Nominated
2005	Separate Lies	London Film Critics' Circle Award for British Actress of the Year	Nominated
2005	Wah-Wah	British Independent Film Award for Best Actress	Nominated
2005	The Proposition	IF Award for Best Actress	Nominated
2005	The Proposition	London Film Critics' Circle Award for British Supporting Actress of the Year	Nominated
2008	Synecdoche, New York	Gotham Independent Film Award for Best Ensemble Cast	Won
2008	Synecdoche, New York	Independent Spirit Award's Robert Altman Award	Won
2009	Cold Souls	Gotham Independent Film Award for Best Ensemble Cast	Nominated
2011	Oranges and Sunshine	AACTA Award for Best Actress in a Leading Role	Nominated
2011	Oranges and Sunshine	Satellite Award for Best Actress in a Motion Picture – Drama	Nominated
2011	Appropriate Adult	BAFTA TV Award for Best Actress	Won
2011	Appropriate Adult	Golden Nymph for Outstanding Actress in a Miniseries	Won
2011	Appropriate Adult	RTS Television Award for Best Actor (Female)	Won
2011	Appropriate Adult	Critics' Choice Television Award for Best Movie/Miniseries Actress	Nominated
2011	Appropriate Adult	Golden Globe Award for Best Actress – Miniseries or Television Film	Nominated
2011	Appropriate Adult	Screen Actors Guild Award for Outstanding Performance by a Female Actor in a Miniseries or Television Movie	Nominated
2013	The Book Thief	Satellite Award for Best Supporting Actress in a Motion Picture – Drama	Nominated
2014	The Theory of Everything	Screen Actors Guild Award for Outstanding Performance by a Cast in a Motion Picture	Nominated
2017	Apple Tree Yard	International Emmy Award for Best Actress	Nominated
2019	Chernobyl	Primetime Emmy Award for Outstanding Supporting Actress in a Limited Series or Movie	Nominated
2019	Chernobyl	Golden Globe Award for Best Supporting Actress – Series, Miniseries or Television Film	Nominated
2019	Chernobyl	Critics' Choice Television Award for Best Supporting Actress in a Movie/Miniseries	Nominated
2019	Chernobyl	Screen Actors Guild Award for Outstanding Performance by a Female Actor in a Miniseries or Television Movie	Nominated
2019	Chernobyl	Satellite Award for Best Supporting Actress – Series, Miniseries or Television Film	Nominated
2022	Too Close	British Academy Television Award for Best Actress	Nominated
2022	God's Creatures	British Independent Film Award for Best Supporting Performance	Nominated
2024	Small Things like These	Silver Bear for Best Supporting Performance	Won
2026	Hamnet	AACTA International Award for Best Supporting Actress	Nominated
2026	Hamnet	Actor Award for Outstanding Performance by a Cast in a Motion Picture	Nominated
2026	Hamnet	BAFTA Award for Best Actress in a Supporting Role	Nominated

=== Honorary awards ===
Year	Organizations	Award	Result	Ref.
2026	Sarajevo Film Festival	Honorary Heart of Sarajevo Award	Honored	
