= Innovation intermediary =

Concept in innovation studies

Innovation Intermediaries is a concept in innovation studies to help understand the role of firms, agencies and individuals that facilitate innovation by providing the bridging, brokering, knowledge transfer necessary to bring together the range of different organisations and knowledge needed to create successful innovation. The term open innovation intermediaries was used for this concept by Henry Chesbrough in his 2006 book as "companies that help other companies implement various facets of open innovation".

== Role ==
Innovation intermediaries are variously described as 'bridgers', ' change agents', 'brokers'. Some innovation ecosystem literature also uses the term "bridge maker" for an intermediary role focused on connecting, facilitating and integrating diverse stakeholders. They are important as the developers of a new invention or technique are seldom connected to their potential users, or to the firms and organisations that have complementary expertise, knowledge and resources. The same applies to potential users of innovations, so that intermediaries are needed to bring organisations and knowledge together to build supply networks and markets. For instance technology intermediaries are created to help firms to take advantage of their technological developments.

There are three main areas of focus:business model innovation; management of intellectual property; innovation of services.

Intermediaries have also been defined as a system of complementary organizational categories that shape, pilot and ensure systemic integration, by reducing the complexity of transactions, enabling institutional change and promoting crucial learning dynamics among system components, organizations and entrepreneurs; across political, economic and social innovation-relevant levels. These categories could be settled together, permitting a holistic approximation to the matter of intermediation. The novel notion of a system of intermediary organizations could also facilitate the coordination and evaluation of their profiles and missions over time and space-based requirements.

Intermediaries play a wide range of roles, facilitating the bringing together of various actors at different parts of innovation processes such as ideation, invention, standards making, managing IPR, commercialisation, creating new market segments etc. These intermediaries can specialise in different services. Basic functions include process coordination and matchmaking between innovation seekers and potential solution providers, knowledge and finance broking, testing, standardisation, project valuation and portfolio management etc. Each of these activities facilitates the exchange and the building of new knowledge, creates opportunities for experimentation, helps the emergence of standards and common goals, and the formation of partnerships.

Open innovation Intermediaries are responsible for facilitating the open innovation activity that companies are undertaking, focusing on fully exploiting the benefits of the mutual action and thoroughly mitigating the disadvantages and risks for all of the companies.

In the special field of technological development of companies, technology intermediaries are created to help firms to take advantage of their knowledge. The intermediaries are specialized in different R&D activities and R&D related activities and are able to support firms in building absorptive capacity.

== Impact ==
From an economic perspective, innovation intermediaries create multi-sided markets by delivering value to several agents on a matching market, create the market and manage the matching process.

In the age of the internet, there are increasing numbers of online services and platform that explicitly try to play the role of innovation intermediary, including technology matchmaking services, crowdfunding and crowdsourcing services, meetup sites etc. Despite the trend of online platforms, a managerial role for effective tie building in networks or efficient technology matchmaking is necessary.

== History ==
Innovation intermediaries have always played a key role in innovation; for example, the agricultural middlemen in 16th, 17th and 18th century Britain who not only bought and sold wool, but facilitated the transfer of knowledge of new techniques. With the recent fashion for 'Open Innovation' involving complex networks of firms and users, organisations such as consultants, service incubators, conference organisers, online platforms, trade organisations, government innovation agencies etc. are now recognised as playing a central role in facilitating and coordinating innovation.

== See also ==
- Innovation management
- Open innovation
- Open innovation intermediaries
- Disintermediation
