= London Film Critics' Circle Award for British Supporting Actress of the Year =

Former British film award

The London Film Critics Circle Award for British Supporting Actress of the Year was an annual award given by the London Film Critics Circle.

== Winners ==
=== 1990s ===
Year	Winner	Film	Role
1997	Minnie Driver	Grosse Pointe Blank, Big Night, Sleepers,	Debi Newberry, Phyllis, Carol Martinez
1998	Kate Beckinsale	The Last Days of Disco	Charlotte Pingress
1998	Minnie Driver	Good Will Hunting	Skylar
1999	Lynn Redgrave	Gods and Monsters	Hanna

=== 2000s ===
Year	Winner	Film	Role
2000	Samantha Morton	Sweet and Lowdown	Hattie
2001	Helen Mirren	Gosford Park and Last Orders	Mrs. Wilson, Amy
2002	Emily Watson	Red Dragon	Reba McClane
2003	Emma Thompson	Love Actually	Karen
2004	Romola Garai	Inside I'm Dancing	Siobhán
2005	Thandiwe Newton	Crash	Christine Thayer
2006	Emily Blunt	The Devil Wears Prada	Emily Charlton
2007	Kelly Macdonald	No Country for Old Men	Carla Jean Moss
2007	Vanessa Redgrave	Atonement	Briony Tallis
2008	Tilda Swinton	The Curious Case of Benjamin Button	Elizabeth Abbott
2009	Anne-Marie Duff	Nowhere Boy	Julia Lennon

=== 2010s ===
Year	Winner	Film	Role
2010	Olivia Williams	The Ghost	Ruth Lang
