= Rose West =

English serial killer and sex offender (born 1953)

- An undated photo of Fred and Rose West (mid-1980s)
- Born: Rosemary Pauline Letts; 29 November 1953 (age 72); Northam, Devon, England
- Spouse: Fred West (m. 1972; died 1995)
- Convictions: Sexual assault, murder (10 counts)
- Penalty: Life imprisonment (whole life order)

Details
- Victims: 10+
- Span of crimes: June 1971 – c. June 1987
- Country: England
- Date apprehended: April 1994; 32 years ago
- Imprisoned at: HM Prison New Hall, Flockton, West Yorkshire, England

Rosemary Pauline West (née Letts; born 29 November 1953) is an English serial killer, serial rapist and child molester who collaborated with her husband, Fred West, in the torture and murder of at least ten young women between 1973 and 1987; she also murdered Fred's eight-year-old daughter, Charmaine, in 1971. The majority of these murders took place at the West residence at 25 Cromwell Street in Gloucester.

Rose West is currently an inmate at New Hall Prison in Flockton, West Yorkshire, after being convicted in 1995 and sentenced to ten life terms with a whole life order. Fred West died by suicide in prison that same year while awaiting trial, following the couple's arrest in 1994.

== Early life ==
Rose West was born Rosemary Pauline Letts, on 29 November 1953, in Northam, Devon, to William Andrew "Bill" Letts and Daisy Gwendoline Fuller after a difficult pregnancy. She was the fifth of seven children born into a poor family. Rose's mother suffered from clinical depression and was given electroconvulsive therapy both during and immediately after her pregnancy; some have argued that this treatment may have caused prenatal developmental injuries to her daughter.

Rose grew up into a moody teenager, prone to daydreaming and performing poorly at school. After her parents separated she initially lived with her mother and attended Cleeve School for six months, then moved in with her father in Bishop's Cleeve, near Cheltenham, Gloucestershire. Rose's father, who suffered from schizophrenia, was prone to extreme violence and sexually abused Rose and her oldest sister, Patricia.

At the onset of puberty, Rose, reportedly fascinated by her developing body, would deliberately parade naked or semi-naked around the house in the presence of her younger brother, Graham (born 1957). On numerous occasions, at the age of 13, she would creep into nine-year-old Graham's bed at nightfall and molest him and her youngest brother, Gordon.

== Meeting Fred West ==
Rose first encountered Fred West at a Cheltenham bus stop in early 1969, shortly after Rose had turned 15 and when Fred was aged 27. She was initially repulsed by Fred's unkempt appearance, but quickly became flattered by the attention he continued to lavish on her over the following days as he invariably sat alongside her at the same bus stop. Rose twice refused to go on a date with Fred, but allowed him to accompany her home.

Having discovered Rose worked in a nearby bread shop, Fred persuaded an unknown woman to enter the shop and present her with a gift accompanied by the explanation that "a man outside" had asked her to present the gift to Rose. Minutes later, Fred entered the shop and asked Rose to accompany him on a date that evening. She accepted the offer. Shortly thereafter, Rose began a relationship with Fred, becoming a frequent visitor at the caravan park where he lived with the two children from his first marriage to Catherine "Rena" Costello: daughter Anne Marie and stepdaughter Charmaine. Rose became a willing childminder to Fred's daughters, who she noted were neglected and whom she initially treated with care and affection. On several occasions in the early days of their courtship, Rose insisted she and Fred take the girls on excursions to gather wildflowers.

Within weeks of her first encounter with Fred, Rose left her job at the bread shop to become a full-time nanny to his children. This decision was made with the agreement that Fred would provide her with sufficient money to give to her parents on Fridays to convince them she was still earning a salary at the bread shop. Several months later, Rose introduced Fred to her family, who were aghast at their daughter's choice of partner. Rose's mother was unimpressed with Fred's boastful and arrogant behaviour, and correctly concluded he was a pathological liar. Her father vehemently disapproved of the relationship, threatening Fred directly and promising to call social services if he continued to associate with his daughter.

=== Relationship ===
Rose's parents forbade their daughter from continuing to date Fred, but she defied their wishes, prompting them to visit Gloucestershire's social services agency to explain that their 15-year-old daughter was having a sexual relationship with an older man, and that they had heard rumours that she had begun to engage in prostitution at Fred's caravan. In response, Rose was placed in a home for troubled teenagers in Cheltenham in August 1969, and only permitted to leave under controlled conditions. When allowed to return home to visit her parents at weekends, Rose almost invariably took the opportunity to visit Fred.

On her 16th birthday, Rose left the home for troubled teenagers to return to her parents while Fred was serving a thirty-day sentence for theft and unpaid fines. Upon his release, Rose left her parents' home to move into a flat in Cheltenham with Fred. Shortly thereafter, Fred collected Charmaine and Anne Marie from social services. Rose's father made one final effort to prevent his daughter from seeing Fred, and Rose was examined by a police surgeon in February 1970, who confirmed she was pregnant. In response, Rose was again placed into care but was discharged on 6 March on the understanding she would terminate her pregnancy and return to her family. Instead, Rose opted to live with Fred, resulting in her father forbidding his daughter from ever again setting foot in his household.

Three months later Fred and Rose vacated the Cheltenham flat and moved to the ground-floor flat of a two-storey house at 25 Midland Road in Gloucester. On 17 October 1970 Rose gave birth to their first child, a daughter they named Heather Ann. (Speculation remains that Heather may have been sired by Rose's own father.) Two months later, Fred was imprisoned for the theft of car tyres and a vehicle tax disc. He remained imprisoned until 24 June 1971. As he served this six-and-a-half-month sentence, Rose, having just turned 17, looked after the three girls, with Charmaine and Anne Marie being told to refer to Rose as their mother.

According to Anne Marie, she and Charmaine were frequently subjected to extensive physical and emotional abuse throughout the time they lived under Rose's care at Midland Road. Although Anne Marie was generally submissive and prone to display emotion in response to the abuse, Charmaine repeatedly infuriated Rose by her stoic refusal to either cry or display any sign of grief or servitude, no matter how severely she was treated. Despite the years of neglect and abuse, Charmaine's spirit had not been broken and she talked wistfully to Anne Marie of the belief she held that "mummy will come and save me." Anne Marie later recollected her sister repeatedly antagonised Rose by making statements such as, "My real mummy wouldn't swear or shout at us," in response to Rose's scathing language.

A childhood friend of Charmaine's named Tracey Giles, who had lived in the upper flat at 25 Midland Road, would later recollect an incident in which she had entered the Wests' flat unannounced only to see Charmaine, naked and standing on a chair, gagged and with her hands bound behind her back with a belt, as Rose stood alongside the child with a large wooden spoon in her hand. According to Giles, Charmaine had been "calm and unconcerned", while Anne Marie had been standing by the door with a blank expression on her face.

Hospital records later revealed that Charmaine had received treatment for a severe puncture wound to her left ankle in the casualty unit of Gloucestershire Royal Hospital on 28 March 1971. This incident was explained by Rose as having resulted from a household accident.

=== Murder of Charmaine West ===
Rose is believed to have murdered Charmaine shortly before Fred's prison release date of 24 June 1971. She is known to have taken Charmaine, Anne Marie and Heather to visit Fred on 15 June, and it is believed that Charmaine was killed on or very shortly after this date. As well as forensic dentistry confirming that Charmaine had died while Fred was still incarcerated, further testimony from Tracey Giles' mother, Shirley, corroborated the fact that Charmaine had died before Fred's release. In her later testimony at Rose's trial, Shirley stated that her two daughters had been playmates of Charmaine and Anne Marie when her family lived in the upper flat of 25 Midland Road in 1971. Shirley further stated that after her family had vacated the flat in April 1971, she had brought Tracey to visit Charmaine on a day in June, only for Tracey to be told by Rose: "She's gone to live with her mother, and bloody good riddance!" Shirley Giles was adamant that Fred was still in prison on this occasion.

As with the Giles family, Rose explained Charmaine's disappearance to others who enquired about her whereabouts by claiming that Fred's first wife, Catherine "Rena" West, had taken her eldest daughter to live with her in Bristol. She contradictorily informed staff at Charmaine's primary school that the child had moved with her mother to London. When Fred was released from prison on 24 June, he allayed Anne Marie's concerns for her sister's whereabouts by claiming Rena had collected Charmaine and returned to her native Scotland. In her autobiography, Out of the Shadows, Anne Marie reflects on how when she asked why her mother had collected Charmaine — who was part-Pakistani, while Anne Marie was fully white — but not her, Fred callously replied: "She wouldn't want you, love. You're the wrong colour."

Charmaine's body was initially stowed in the coal cellar of Midland Road until Fred was released from prison. He later buried her naked body in the yard close to the back door of the flat, and remained adamant that he had not dismembered her. A subsequent post-mortem suggested the body had been severed at the hip, but that this damage may have been caused by building work Fred conducted at the property in 1976. Several bones—particularly patellae, finger, wrist, toe and ankle bones—were missing from Charmaine's skeleton, leading to speculation that the missing parts had been retained as keepsakes. This trait would prove to be a distinctive finding in all the autopsies of the Wests' victims when they were exhumed in 1994.

=== Murder of Catherine "Rena" West ===
Rena maintained sporadic contact with her children on each occasion she and Fred separated. She is also known to have visited Fred's family in Much Marcle, Herefordshire, to enquire as to her children's whereabouts and welfare in the latter half of August 1971. Fred's sister-in-law, Christine, later recollected Rena was depressed and extremely anxious about her children. Being provided with Fred's Midland Road address, Rena sought to confront him—likely to discuss or demand custody of her daughters. This was the last time Rena was seen alive. She is believed to have been murdered by strangulation, possibly in the back seat of Fred's Ford Popular and likely while intoxicated. When Rena's body was discovered, a short length of metal tubing was found with her remains, leaving open a possibility she had been restrained and subjected to a sexual assault prior to her murder. The body was extensively dismembered, placed into plastic bags and buried close to a cluster of trees, known as Yewtree Coppice, at Letterbox Field.

== Marriage ==
On 29 January 1972, Fred and Rose married. The ceremony took place at Gloucester Register Office, with Fred falsely classifying himself as a bachelor on the marriage certificate. No family or friends were invited.

Several months later, with Rose pregnant with her second child, the couple moved from Midland Road to an address nearby: 25 Cromwell Street. Initially the three-storey home, located close to Gloucester city centre, was rented from the council; Fred eventually purchased the property for £7,000 (equivalent to £83,000 in 2025) under the Right to Buy scheme. To facilitate the purchase, many of the upper-floor rooms were initially converted into bedsits to supplement the household income. To maintain a degree of privacy for his own family, Fred installed a cooker and washbasin on the first-floor landing in order that their lodgers need not enter the ground floor where his family lived. Only Fred and his family were permitted access to the back garden of the property.

On 1 June 1972, Rose gave birth to a second daughter. The date of her birth led the Wests to name the child Mae June. Rose's first son, Stephen, was born in August 1973.

=== Prostitution ===
Shortly after giving birth to her second child, Rose began to work as a prostitute, operating from an upstairs room at Cromwell Street and advertising her services in a local contact magazine. Fred encouraged Rose to seek clients in Gloucester's West Indian community through these advertisements. In addition to her prostitution, Rose engaged in casual sex with both male and female lodgers within their household, and individuals Fred encountered via his work. She also bragged to several people that no man or woman could completely satisfy her. When engaging in sexual relations with women, Rose would gradually increase the level of brutality to which she subjected her partner, with acts such as partially asphyxiating her partner or inserting increasingly large dildos into her partner's body. If the woman resisted or expressed any pain or fear, Rose would become greatly excited and typically ask: "Aren't you woman enough to take it?"

To many of these women, it became apparent Rose and her husband (who regularly participated in threesomes with his wife and her lovers) took a particular pleasure from taking women beyond their sexual limits—typically via sessions involving bondage. The Wests openly admitted to taking a particular pleasure from any form of sex involving a strong measure of dominance, violence and pain. To cater to these fetishes, they amassed a large collection of bondage and restraining devices, magazines and photographs, later expanding this collection to include videos depicting bestiality and graphic child sexual abuse.

Rose controlled the family's finances, with Fred giving her his pay packets. The room Rose used for prostitution was known throughout the household as "Mandy's Room" (Mandy being the working name Rose used when she was with her clients) and had several hidden peepholes allowing Fred—a longtime voyeur—to watch her activities. Fred also installed a baby monitor in the room, allowing him to listen from elsewhere in the house. The room included a private bar, and a red light outside the door warned when Rose was not to be disturbed. Rose carried the sole key to this room around her neck, and Fred installed a separate doorbell to the household which her clients were instructed to ring whenever they visited. Much of the money earned from Rose's prostitution was spent on home improvements.

By 1977, Rose's father Bill had come to tolerate his daughter's marriage, and to develop a grudging respect for Fred. Together, he and Fred opened a café they named The Green Lantern, which was soon insolvent. When Bill discovered Rose's prostitution, he would also visit Cromwell Street to have sex with his daughter.

By 1983, Rose had given birth to eight children, at least three of whom had been conceived by clients. (Note: The final five children Rose gave birth to were: Tara (b. 1977); Louise (b. 1978); Barry (b. 1980); Rosemary Jr. (b. 1982); and Lucyanna (b. 1983). Only Barry West is believed to have been fathered by Fred, with at least three of the other children conceived by clients.) Fred willingly accepted these children as his own, and falsely informed them the reason their skin was darker than that of their siblings was because his great-grandmother was a black woman.

=== Domestic violence ===
When each of the West children reached the age of seven, they were assigned numerous daily chores to perform in the house. They were seldom allowed to socialise outside the household unless either Fred or Rose were present, and had to follow strict guidelines imposed by their parents, with severe punishment—almost always physical—being the penalty for not conforming to the household rules. The children feared being the recipients of violence from both parents, but Rose inflicted the vast majority of the physical abuse. The violence was sometimes irrational, indiscreet or just inflicted for Rose's gratification. She always took great care not to mark the children's faces or hands in these assaults.

Fred informed Stephen that he would have to have sex with his mother, Rose, by the age of 17.

First Heather, and then her younger brother Stephen, ran away from home. They both returned to Cromwell Street after several weeks of alternately sleeping rough or staying with friends, and they were each beaten upon their return. Between 1972 and 1992 the West children were admitted to the casualty units of local hospitals 31 times. The injuries were explained as accidents and never reported to social services. In 1980, Anne Marie was found to have an ectopic pregnancy and gonorrhea.

On one occasion, as Stephen was mopping the kitchen floor with a cloth, Rose accidentally stepped into the bowl of water he had been using. In response, Rose hit the boy over the head with the bowl, then repeatedly kicked him in the head and chest as she shouted, "You did that on purpose, you little swine!" On another occasion Rose became furious about a missing kitchen utensil, grabbed a knife she had been using to cut a slab of meat, and repeatedly inflicted abrasions to Mae June's chest until her rib cage was covered with light knife wounds. All the while Mae screamed, "No, Mum! No, Mum!" as Heather and Stephen stood by, sobbing helplessly.

Even Fred was a sporadic victim of his wife's violence. On one occasion in August 1974 Rose pursued Fred with a carving knife in her hand. Fred was able to run into a different room and slam the door shut behind himself as Rose lunged at him with the knife. The knife embedded itself in the door, and Rose's hand slid down the blade, almost severing three fingers. In response, Rose calmly wrapped her hand in a towel and said, "Look what you done, fella. You've got to take me to the hospital now."

== Initial sexual assaults ==
=== Anne Marie West ===
In September 1972, the Wests led eight-year-old Anne Marie to the cellar at 25 Cromwell Street. The child was ordered to undress, with Rose tearing her dress from her body upon noting the child's hesitation. She was then stripped naked, bound to a mattress and gagged before Fred raped her with Rose's active encouragement. After the rape, Rose followed Anna Marie to the bathroom and handed her a sanitary towel, explaining to the child, "Everybody does it to every girl. It's a father's job. Don't worry, and don't say anything to anybody." Making clear these sexual assaults would continue, Fred and Rose then threatened the child with severe beatings if they ever received word she had divulged the sexual abuse she endured at their hands.

Rose occasionally sexually abused Anne Marie herself, and later took extreme gratification in degrading her with acts such as binding her to various items of furniture before encouraging Fred to rape her, or forcing her to perform household chores while wearing sexual devices and a miniskirt. Fred and Rose forced Anne Marie into prostitution from the age of 13, telling clients she was aged 16. Rose was always present in the room when these acts occurred to ensure the girl did not reveal her true age. On one occasion when Anne Marie was aged 13 or 14, Rose took her to a local pub, insisting she drink several glasses of barley wine. Several hours later, Fred arrived at the pub to collect Rose and Anne Marie. Once they had left the premises, Anne Marie was bundled into her father's van and beaten by Rose, who asked her, "Do you think you could be my friend?" before she was sexually abused by her father and stepmother.

=== Caroline Owens ===
In October 1972, the Wests hired 17-year-old Caroline Owens as their children's nanny. They had picked her up one night on a secluded country road as she hitchhiked from Tewkesbury to her home in Cinderford, having visited her boyfriend. Learning that Owens disliked her stepfather and was looking for a job, Fred and Rose offered her part-time employment as a nanny to the three children then in their household, with a promise she would be driven home each Tuesday. Several days later, Owens moved into 25 Cromwell Street and shared a room with Anne Marie, whom Owens noted was "very withdrawn."

Rose, who had begun to engage in prostitution by this time, explained to Owens that she worked as a masseuse when the younger woman enquired about the steady stream of men visiting her. When Owens herself became the recipient of the Wests' overt sexual advances, she announced her intentions to leave Cromwell Street and return home.

Knowing Owens' habits of hitchhiking along the A40 between Cinderford and Tewkesbury, the Wests formulated a plan to abduct her for their shared gratification. Fred later admitted that the specific intent of this abduction was the rape and likely murder of Owens, but that his initial incentive was to determine whether his wife would be willing to at least assist him in an abduction. On 6 December 1972, the couple lured Owens into their vehicle with an apology for their previous conduct and the offer of a lift home. Initially, Owens believed the Wests had been sincere in their apologies and obliged, believing she had simply mistaken their earlier intentions. Rose joined her in the back seat, with the explanation she wanted a "girls' chat" as Fred drove.

Shortly thereafter, Rose began to fondle Owens, as Fred questioned whether she had had sex with her boyfriend that evening. When Owens began to protest, Fred stopped the car, referred to Owens as a "bitch" and punched her into unconsciousness before he and Rose bound and gagged her with a scarf and duct tape. In her subsequent statement to police, Owens stated that, at Cromwell Street, she was given a drugged cup of tea to drink before being again gagged and subjected to a prolonged sexual assault from the Wests. When Owens screamed, Rose smothered her with a pillow, further restrained her about the neck and performed cunnilingus on her. Realising the gravity of her situation, Owens ceased resisting their sexual assaults.

The following morning, having noted Owens' screaming when one of his children had knocked on the door of the room in which she was restrained, Fred threatened that he and his wife would keep her locked in the cellar and allow his "black friends" to abuse her, and that when they had finished he would bury her body beneath "the paving stones of Gloucester." Fred then claimed he had killed hundreds of young girls, adding that Owens had primarily been brought to the house for "Rose's pleasure." He and Rose then calmly asked Owens whether she would consider returning to work as their nanny. Seeing her escape avenue, Owens agreed and vacuumed the house to indicate her acquiescence to becoming an extended member of the family. Later that day, Owens escaped from a launderette she and Rose had entered and returned home. Although initially too ashamed to divulge what had happened, when her mother noted the welts, bruises and exposed subcutaneous tissues on her daughter's body, Owens burst into tears and confided her ordeal.

Owens' mother immediately reported her daughter's story to police, and the Wests were arrested and charged with assault, indecent assault, actual bodily harm and rape. The case was tried at Gloucester Magistrates Court on 12 January 1973, but by this date Owens had decided she could not face the ordeal of giving testimony. All charges pertaining to her ordeal were dropped, and the Wests agreed to plead guilty to the reduced charges of indecent assault and causing actual bodily harm. Rose and Fred were each fined £50 (equivalent to £1,000 in 2025) and the couple were allowed to walk free. When Owens heard this news, she attempted suicide.

== Investigation and arrest ==
On 6 August 1992, Rose was arrested for child cruelty, alongside Fred, who was accused of sexually assaulting his 13-year-old daughter three times. The case against them collapsed on 7 June 1993, when their daughter refused to testify in court. All five of the Wests' younger children were removed from their custody to foster homes. This case brought to light the disappearance of Heather, who had not been seen since 1987, and triggered the major investigation that followed.

After police had found human remains and apparent signs of torture at 25 Cromwell Street, Rose and Fred were arrested again in February 1994. During her trial Rose denied murdering any of the victims, and insisted that her husband had committed the criminal acts alone. She also claimed to have tried to stop one of the sexual assaults her husband had committed. Rose continued to profess ignorance of her husband's activities, but the circumstantial evidence that mounted against the couple was considered sufficient to prosecute her for ten murders: those of the nine young women whose bodies were found at Cromwell Street, and of Charmaine West. Fred was charged with two further murders committed before his association with Rose.

After his arrest in February 1994, Fred confided to his appropriate adult, Janet Leach, that Rose had murdered Shirley Robinson and had assisted in her dismemberment, personally removing Robinson's foetus from the womb in the process. Found under the patio at Cromwell Street was the body of the Wests' daughter, Heather, who had been murdered in June 1987 after being abused by her parents all her life. It is said that Heather had begun to tell her friends about her abuse. Barry, her younger brother, would later describe watching, as a seven-year-old, his mother kick Heather repeatedly about the head until she was no longer moving. The Wests had told friends and concerned parties that Heather left home to work at a Devonshire holiday village and on one occasion fabricated a phone call, supposedly from Heather, to allay her siblings' suspicions about her disappearance. Fred would even taunt his children when they misbehaved by jokingly stating, "If you don't behave, you'll end up under the patio like Heather." This was the last known murder that the pair committed.

While on remand at HM Prison Birmingham, Fred died by suicide by hanging on 1 January 1995.

== Trial ==
At pretrial proceedings in February 1995, Rose pleaded not guilty to ten charges of murder (the murder of Charmaine having been added to the original nine after Fred's suicide, and two counts of rape and indecent assault of young girls having been dropped with a view for later resubmission), though her counsel conceded that circumstantial evidence indicated Rose's willingness to subject young girls to sadistic physical and sexual abuse. Her trial at Winchester Crown Court began on 3 October 1995, with Mr Justice Mantell and a jury. An important early decision by the judge was to admit testimony related to the sexual assault of three women by Fred and Rose, accepting the prosecution's argument that it established a pattern of behaviour repeated in the murders.

=== Prosecution ===
In his opening statement, prosecutor Brian Leveson portrayed the Wests as sadistic sex-obsessed murderers, terming the bodies discovered at Cromwell Street and Midland Road "secrets more terrible than words can express ... [The victims'] last moments on earth were as objects of the sexual depravity of this woman and her husband." He pointed out that Fred had been incarcerated when Charmaine was killed, claimed that Fred and Rose had each learned from their mistake in allowing Owens to live, and said that the gag on victim Thérèse Siegenthaler evinced a "feminine" touch‍—‌a scarf tied in a bow. Leveson promised to demonstrate Rose's controlling and sexually sadistic character, as well as her efforts to deflect suspicion about the disappearance of their victims.

Prosecution witnesses included Cromwell Street lodgers, victims' relatives, Rose's mother, Daisy, and sister, Glenys, and surviving victims including Kathryn Halliday (a former lover of Fred and Rose), Owens, Anne Marie and a "Miss A" (who had been sexually assaulted at age 14 by Fred and Rose in 1977 and who described Rose as the more aggressive perpetrator of the two). Neighbours described Charmaine's 1971 disappearance while Fred was imprisoned and Rose's casual indifference to Heather's disappearance. Rose's counsel, Dick Ferguson, tried to discredit prosecution witnesses as either having financially exploited their connection to the case or being motivated by grudges. Owens, though admitting to receiving £20,000 for her story, described her extreme survivor's guilt: "I only want to get justice for the girls who didn't make it. I feel like it was my fault."

=== Defence testimony ===
Ferguson emphasised that Fred, before meeting Rose, had committed at least one murder strikingly similar to those at issue in the present trial, and that the prosecution's case was largely circumstantial. He contended that Rose was unaware of the extent of Fred's sadism and urged the jury not to be prejudiced by her promiscuity and domineering manner.

Against the advice of her counsel, Rose herself testified; her affect sometimes morose and tearful, sometimes upbeat and humorous. She wept while describing herself as a victim of child sexual abuse who naively married a violent and domineering man, but joked about issues such as her "always being pregnant" and laughed while describing one victim's "grandfather glasses". Rose also claimed never to have met six of the victims buried at Cromwell Street, and to recall very little of her assault on Owens. When shown photographs of the victims buried in the cellar and of victim Alison Chambers, and asked by Leveson whether she recognised any of their faces, Rose's face turned bright red and she repeatedly stuttered as she replied, "No, sir."

When questioned about life at Cromwell Street, Rose claimed she and Fred had lived separate lives, which was inconsistent with the earlier testimony of witnesses who had visited or lodged at their address. In reference to her relationship with her eldest child, Rose admitted her relations with Heather were strained before claiming to the court that her daughter was a lesbian who had physically and psychologically abused her siblings. Despite these allegations, Rose stated she had loved her daughter and had no knowledge of her murder. Further questioned about the contradictory explanations she and Fred had given about Heather's disappearance, Rose claimed these discrepancies had stemmed from telephone conversations she had had with Heather after she had left home.

The defence next called a succession of women who claimed to have been attacked or assaulted between 1966 and 1975 by a lone male whose physical description matched that of Fred. These seven women each testified they had recognised their attacker as Fred when his photograph was publicised in 1994. The intention of this testimony was to illustrate to the jury that Fred was capable of abducting, assaulting or attempting to attack women without Rose, which the prosecution had never disputed. The physical recollections of several of these women varied greatly.

The final witness to testify at Rose's trial was Janet Leach, Fred's appointed appropriate adult, whom the prosecution had called to testify on 7 November in rebuttal of the tape recordings of Fred's confession, which had been played to the court on 3 November, in which he had stressed Rose had "known nothing at all" about the murders. Leach testified that through her role Fred had gradually begun to view her as a confidante and had confided in her that on the evening prior to his 25 February arrest he and Rose had formed a pact whereby he would take full responsibility for all the murders, many of which he had described to her as being "some of Rose's mistakes." Fred had further divulged that Rose had indeed murdered Charmaine while he had been incarcerated, and had also murdered Robinson. He had also confided that Rose had participated in the mutilation and dismemberment of Robinson, having personally removed the foetus from Robinson's womb after her death. In reference to the remaining eight murders for which Rose had been charged, Leach testified Fred had confided that Rose had "played a major part" in these murders.

Upon cross-examination, Leach did concede to Ferguson she had earlier lied under oath about having sold her story to a national newspaper for £100,000, although she was adamant about the sincerity of her testimony. While delivering this testimony, Leach collapsed and the trial was adjourned for six days. She returned to complete her cross-examination on 13 November.

=== Conviction ===
After seven weeks of evidence the judge instructed the jury, emphasising that circumstantial evidence can be sufficient for a finding of guilt and that if two people take part in a murder the law considers them equally guilty regardless of which did the deed. On 21 and 22 November 1995, the jury returned unanimous guilty verdicts for all ten murders. Terming her crimes "appalling and depraved", Mr Justice Mantell sentenced Rose to life imprisonment, emphasising that she should never be paroled. The Lord Chief Justice later decided that she should spend at least twenty-five years in prison, but in July 1997, Home Secretary Jack Straw subjected Rose to a whole life tariff. This was the second instance of a whole life tariff imposed on a woman in the UK in modern times, the first having been serial killer Myra Hindley in 1990.

==== Appeal ====
In March 1996, Rose announced her intention to appeal against her sentence, contending that extensive press coverage had rendered witness testimony unreliable, that no physical evidence existed to attest she had participated in any of the murders, that the final instructions delivered by the judge to the jury had been biased in favour of the prosecution, and that undue weight had been given to the similar fact evidence introduced at her trial. This appeal was rejected by the Lord Chief Justice, Lord Taylor of Gosforth, who contended Rose had received a fair trial and efficient legal representation. In July 1997, then-Home Secretary Jack Straw subjected Rose to a whole life tariff, effectively denying her any possibility of parole. In October 2000, Rose again announced that she would appeal against her sentence via her solicitor, Leo Goatley. In September 2001, she announced her intention to abandon her appeals, stating she would never feel free even if released. She maintains her innocence in any of the murders.

== Incarceration ==
Initially Rose was incarcerated at HM Prison Bronzefield, Middlesex, as a Category A prisoner. She was transferred to HM Prison Low Newton in County Durham in 2008.

It was reported in May 1995 that Rose and Myra Hindley—who were both incarcerated in HM Prison Durham at the time (Rose was on remand)—had formed a "friendship". Hindley denied the claims as "nonsense". Rose acknowledged that they knew each other from being on the same wing but denied further speculation that the two were "having an affair".

Both of Rose's eldest biological children, and her stepdaughter, Anna Marie, initially visited her in prison on a regular basis, although by 2006 she had ceased contact with them after Mae began asking questions about her culpability in the murders. Rose justified her decision with the explanation: "I was never a parent [then] and could never be now."

In 2019 Rose was transferred to HM Prison New Hall in West Yorkshire. It was reported the transfer had taken place after serial killer Joanna Dennehy, who had just been transferred to Low Newton, had threatened to kill Rose, although official sources stated that the reports were untrue.

== Victims ==
Fred and Rose West are known to have committed at least twelve murders between 1967 and 1987. Many investigators, authors and journalists who have studied the case believe there are other victims whose bodies have never been found. Prior to his suicide, police had amassed more than 108 hours of tape-recorded interviews with Fred, from both the period when he claimed to have acted alone in the commission of the murders and after he began to portray Rose as being the more culpable participant.

On several occasions, Fred made cryptic hints he had murdered several other girls but refused to divulge any further information. Fred claimed to Janet Leach that there were up to 20 further victims he and Rose had murdered, "not in one place but spread around," and that he intended to reveal the location of one body per year to investigators.

The following are murder victims attributed or partly attributed to Rose West:

=== 1971 ===
- c. 20 June: Charmaine West (8). Fred's stepdaughter. Charmaine was killed by Rose, likely in a fit of rage, shortly before Fred's release from Leyhill Prison on 24 June. Her remains were initially stored in the cellar at 25 Midland Road before Fred buried the child's body in the back garden of the flat.

=== 1973 ===
- c. 20 April: Lynda Gough (19). The first sexually motivated killing the Wests are known to have committed together. Gough was a lodger at 25 Cromwell Street and shared sex partners with Rose. Following her disappearance, Gough's mother travelled to Cromwell Street to enquire about her daughter's whereabouts and saw Rose wearing her daughter's clothes and slippers. She was informed that Lynda had moved to find work in Weston-super-Mare. Lynda's remains were buried in an inspection pit beneath the garage, which was later converted into a bathroom.
- 10 November: Carol Ann Cooper (15). Cooper had been placed into care following her mother's death in 1966. She was last seen alive by her boyfriend in the suburb of Warndon boarding a bus to her grandmother's home. Fred referred to Cooper as "Scar Hand" in reference to a recent firework burn she had sustained. Cooper was the final victim unearthed from the cellar. Her skull was bound with surgical tape and her dismembered limbs bound with cord and braiding cloth.
- 27 December: Lucy Partington (21). Partington was an Exeter University student and the cousin of novelist Martin Amis. She was abducted from a bus stop along the A435. Her precise date of death may have been one week after her disappearance, as Fred admitted himself into the casualty unit of Gloucestershire Royal Hospital with a serious laceration of his right hand on 3 January, possibly sustained as he dismembered Partington's body. Her body was discovered in the Cromwell Street cellar on 6 March 1994.

=== 1974 ===
- 16 April: Thérèse Siegenthaler (21). A sociology student at Greenwich Community College, Siegenthaler was abducted by the Wests as she hitchhiked from South London to Holyhead. Fred mistook her Swiss accent for Dutch and always referred to her as either "the Dutch girl" or "Tulip". She was reported missing to Scotland Yard by her family in Switzerland when communication from their daughter abruptly ceased. Fred later further concealed Siegenthaler's remains by building a false chimney breast on her grave.
- 15 November: Shirley Hubbard (15). A foster child abducted from a Droitwich bus stop close to the River Severn as she travelled home from a date. Aged 15 when murdered, Hubbard had been attending work experience in Worcester and was last seen by her boyfriend, having promised to meet him the next day. Her dismembered remains were found in a section of the cellar known to the family as the "Marilyn Monroe area". Hubbard's head had been completely covered in tape, with a one-eighth-inch (3.2 mm) diameter rubber tube inserted three inches (7.6 cm) into her nasal cavity to enable her to breathe.

=== 1975 ===
- 12 April: Juanita Mott (18). Mott had been a former lodger at 25 Cromwell Street but was living with a family friend in Newent when she disappeared. Mott is believed to have been abducted by the Wests as she hitchhiked along the B4215. In his subsequent confessions to police, Fred would refer to Mott as "the girl from Newent".

=== 1978 ===
- 10 May: Shirley Robinson (18). Another former lodger at 25 Cromwell Street, Robinson was bisexual and engaged in casual sex with Fred and Rose. At the time of her disappearance she had been eight months pregnant with Fred's child and her baby boy had been due to be born on 11 June. No sexual motive existed for this murder, and the prosecution contended at Rose's trial that Robinson had been murdered as her pregnancy threatened the stability of the Wests' relationship. Fred had originally planned to sell their baby to a childless couple and had professional photographs taken with Robinson for this purpose.

=== 1979 ===
- 5 August: Alison Chambers (16). Chambers had been placed into foster care at the age of 14 and had repeatedly absconded from Jordan's Brook House. She became acquainted with the Wests in mid-1979, and Fred later claimed to his solicitor that Chambers had died as a result of Rose becoming "too bloody vicious" with her. Her dismembered body, missing several bones and with a leather belt looped beneath her jaw and tied at the top of her head, was buried in the garden of Cromwell Street. This was the final murder where a definite sexual motive was established.

=== 1987 ===
- 19 June: Heather West (16). Heather was likely to have been murdered because the Wests considered her efforts to leave the household as a threat, since she had divulged to her classmates the extensive physical and sexual abuse that occurred at Cromwell Street. Fred claimed he had not intended to kill his daughter, but carpet fibres found on two lengths of rope discovered with her remains suggested that she had been restrained and subjected to a sexual assault prior to her murder. Her body was dismembered with a heavy serrated knife and later buried in a hole in the garden, which Fred got his son to dig under the pretence of installing a fish pond. The 1994 police investigation into Heather's disappearance led to the discovery of her body and the arrest of both her parents.

== Possible additional victims ==
Police firmly believe the Wests were responsible for further unsolved murders and disappearances. They believed the couple committed ten murders between 1971 and 1979, at least seven of which were for sexual purposes. Following the rash of murders between 1973 and 1975, Fred and Rose are not known to have committed any murders until 1978. They committed one further murder in 1979, followed by an eight-year lull until they murdered their daughter in 1987. Police do not know of any further murders they committed before their 1994 arrest, although Fred confessed to murdering up to thirty people, indicating up to eighteen other undiscovered victims.

One theory which may explain the sudden lull in the frequency of their murders is the fact that by the mid-1970s, the Wests had begun a practice of befriending teenage girls from nearby care homes, many of whom they sexually abused, with others encouraged to engage in prostitution within their home. The Wests established acquaintances—including several of their lodgers—willing to participate in their shared fetishes, which may have satiated the couple to a degree.

Owens, Anna Marie and several other survivors of sexual assaults at the Wests' hands each testified at Rose's trial that she had been by far the more calculating, aggressive and controlling of the two. Owens stated that, at one stage in her ordeal, Fred had said that they had abducted Owens primarily for Rose's gratification. It is possible Rose's increasing family size, plus the fact she and her husband had, by the mid-1970s, begun seeking avenues to exploit girls from care homes in addition to acquiring contacts—willing or unwilling—to submit to their fetishes, may have led the couple to decide that these avenues of control and domination were sufficient for their satisfaction.

== Aftermath ==
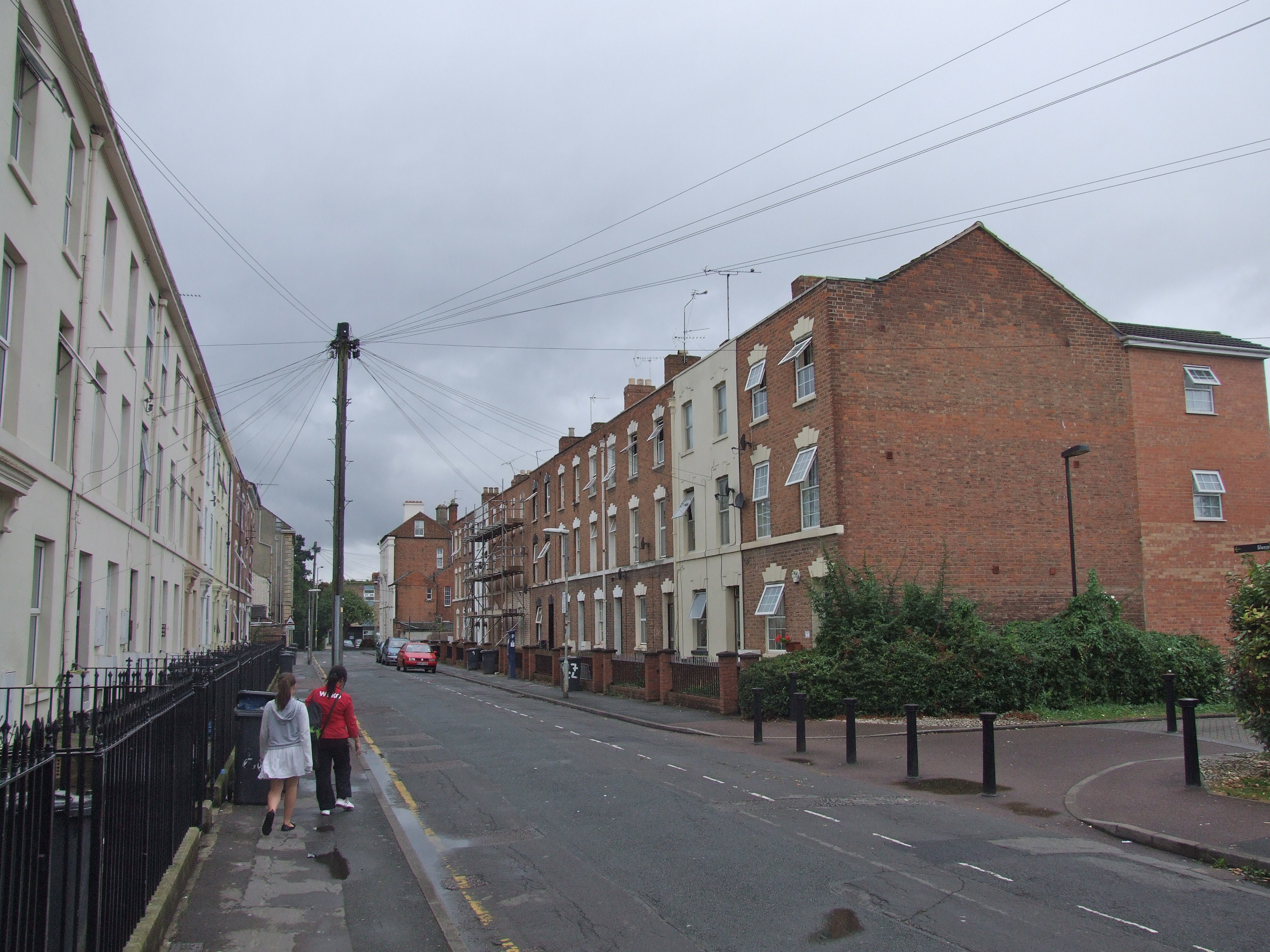
Cromwell Street, Gloucester, in 2011: No. 25 once stood in the space behind the bollards

Fred's body was cremated in Coventry on 29 March 1995 in a funeral that was attended by just four of his children. In a five-minute service, in which no hymns were sung, the Reverend Robert Simpson quoted sections of Psalm 23, then added a solemn reminder to those present that they must "also remember everyone else who has also suffered because of these tragic events." His ashes are believed to have been scattered at the Welsh seaside resort of Barry Island, a location he had regularly visited both as a child and as an adult with his family.

The remains of Charmaine and Rena were cremated in Kettering. At the insistence of Anna Marie West, mother and daughter shared the same coffin, and no roses were to be brought to the service by any mourners.

After the 1994 arrest of their parents, the four youngest West children (born between 1978 and 1983) were given new identities to protect them from the notoriety of their family. Each child remained in foster care.

Two weeks after Anna Marie delivered her testimony against her stepmother in 1995, she attempted suicide. She again attempted suicide in 1999 by throwing herself from a bridge into the River Severn. (Note: Anna Marie later changed her name to Anne Marie.) When asked at trial why she had not spoken against the ongoing physical, emotional, and sexual abuse she had endured for seven years before running away from home when she was aged 15, Anna Marie emphasised that, as a child and adolescent, she had not known any other normality, adding, "[My father and stepmother] were all I had."

Fred's younger brother, John, hanged himself in the garage of his Gloucester home in November 1996. At the time of his suicide, he had been awaiting the jury verdict in his trial for the alleged multiple rapes of his niece, Anna Marie, and another underage girl at Cromwell Street in the 1970s. (Note: Anna Marie had earlier testified to having been raped approximately 300 times as a child by John West.)

The Wests' son Stephen is also known to have made a suicide attempt by hanging in 2002. In 2004 he was jailed for nine months for having unlawful sex with a 14-year-old girl on multiple occasions.

Another of the West children, Barry, took his own life via a suspected drug overdose in October 2020 at the age of 40. For several years prior to his death, he is known to have battled a drug addiction and psychiatric problems as a result of the abuse he had endured and witnessed, including the murder of his sister Heather, as a child.

The Wests' house in Cromwell Street was demolished in October 1996, with every piece of debris destroyed to discourage potential souvenir hunters. It had been referred to in the press as the "House of Horrors." The site was later redeveloped into a public pathway.

As of May 2026, Rose remains incarcerated at New Hall jail, in Wakefield, West Yorkshire, where she maintains her innocence.

== See also ==
- Philip Smith, a former neighbour of the Wests, who also became a spree killer.
- List of serial killers in the United Kingdom
