= Janet Leach (appropriate adult) =

Appropriate adult during the questioning of Fred West

Janet Leach is an English social worker, known for the role she played as an appropriate adult in the questioning of Fred West, one of the two perpetrators of the Gloucester serial murders. For these murders, he and his wife Rose West, against whom Leach testified at trial, became notorious.

The murders—first committed by Fred before he met Rose and then by the two of them as co-conspirators—included the kidnapping, rape, torture, and murder of various young women, including their own children and stepchildren. Fred killed himself in his cell while on remand on New Year's Day 1995. Rose was convicted and became one of four women in Britain to be given a whole life tariff, the others being Myra Hindley, Joanna Dennehy and Lucy Letby.

== Life and work with police ==
An appropriate adult is a parent, guardian, social worker, or volunteer who, when a child under 18 or vulnerable adult is called in for questioning by police, helps them understand the legal process. Leach was a thirty-eight-year-old mother of five, divorced from her first husband and training to be a social worker, when in 1994 she was asked to serve in this capacity for Fred West due to his illiteracy and the severity of the charges levelled against him.

An unpaid volunteer, Leach knew nothing about West beyond his age and illiteracy, and didn't know what he was accused of before sitting in on the interrogation. When they first met he denied killing his daughter, Heather, to detectives but later confessed to Leach who, due to a confidentiality agreement, couldn't share the information with anyone, including police. Before West's suicide, Leach spent more than 400 hours in his company; hearing the details of his crimes created a mental strain. Eventually, she refused to remain in the role of his appropriate adult unless he confessed to police, which he did. West had developed an attachment to Leach, describing her as his "only friend" and refusing to speak to detectives unless she was present. Leach recalled that speculation about their supposed bond was rife. Due to a physical resemblance to Anne McFall, a lover of West's whom he probably murdered before he met Rosemary, untrue rumours spread that she was related to him, or possibly one of his girlfriends.

== Controversy and trial ==
The nature of Leach's connection with Fred West has been controversial. She stayed in contact with him even after questioning ended and there was nothing for her to do in her capacity as appropriate adult. Her son claimed that she "fell under West's spell" and that she became greatly distressed when she learned that he had killed himself. Janet denied this, saying that her grief was due to West dying before giving her the information needed to find still missing bodies. She said that she kept talking to Fred to find out what had happened to his victims:

"I was desperate. I couldn’t sleep at night. I kept having nightmares about all those poor girls in the cellar. But I felt I had to keep talking to Fred. Otherwise, how would their families ever know what had happened to them?"

The stress she was under contributed to a dramatic moment in the trial of the Wests. Unexpectedly called to testify against Rosemary, Leach had a stroke in the witness box after falsely claiming that she had not signed a deal with the press to sell her story. In fact, she had sold her story to the Daily Mirror and admitted this when she returned to the witness box several days later, following treatment at a hospital.

== Aftermath ==
In 1997, Leach lodged a complaint with the Court of Appeal seeking the right to sue police for compensation on the grounds that she suffered posttraumatic stress disorder as a result of her work as an appropriate adult for Fred West. Unlike the officers and defence solicitor involved in the case, she had not been offered counselling, as she was an unpaid volunteer. In November 1997 her original claim for compensation was thrown out by a judge, who ruled that the police did not owe her a duty of care. Her defence team put forward that a duty of care was appropriate since she had been asked to sit with one of the most notorious criminals of the 20th century.

== Dramatisation ==
The 2011 TV drama Appropriate Adult, starring Emily Watson as Leach, focused on the part played by Leach in the police interviews with Fred West, in the visits to the crime scenes, and in Leach's prison visits and correspondence with West. Commenting on the series, retired police officer Bennet, who was in charge of the investigation, said that although the portrayals of Fred and Rose West were "hauntingly accurate", providing "an even deeper insight" into their psyche, Leach's role in the case was exaggerated.

Writing in the Independent about the ITV television dramatisation Appropriate Adult James Rampton states "...the exchanges between West and Leach make for chilling subject matter. There are echoes of The Silence of the Lambs in the way Leach is mentally seduced by the magnetic, yet deeply manipulative West." The television production was well received critically and received eight BAFTA television award nominations. In defence of Leach, Watson said: "Everyone involved in the case entered a moral universe for which they were completely unequipped". Writer Neil McKay commented: "I do feel that Janet’s story in many ways reflects how any of us would have reacted".
