= Non-Registered Intermediary =

If a defendant in England and Wales is identified as being vulnerable, special measures can be taken to allow a non-registered intermediary to assist them during their trial. Around two thirds of all offenders have communication difficulties and there is a high demand for non-registered intermediaries in the criminal courts. The first practical use of a defendant intermediary in a major trial is believed to be a murder case before a high court judge. If an intermediary is to be used the court should then attempt to find an appropriate intermediary. HMCTS staff have been issued with guidance which includes the list of several professional organisations that may be able to assist in providing an intermediary. The two largest providers of intermediaries for defendants in the criminal and family courts are Communicourt and Triangle

Intermediaries carry out a range of functions to assist the courts and criminal justice practitioners including:

- Carrying out a detailed and specialist assessment of the defendant's communication skills
- Preparation of a report providing advice, guidance and information to the courts and criminal justice practitioners on how to Achieve Best Evidence from the defendant, including what types of questions to avoid, how long the defendant will need to process and answer a question and when they will need breaks
- Helping a defendant to follow the course of a trial and the case against him/her
- Assisting criminal justice practitioners to rephrase questions the defendant does not understand (without changing the substantive meaning) and communicating their answers to the court

== The Difference Between Registered and Non-Registered Intermediaries ==
The Youth Justice & Criminal Evidence Act 1999 created the provision for a range of "Special Measures" for cases involving vulnerable and intimidated witnesses to give their best evidence in court, one of which is the intermediary special measure. The Witness Intermediary Scheme (WIS) was set up by the Ministry of Justice’s Better Trials Unit to implement the intermediary special measure. The National Policing Improvement Agency operate and manage the WIS’s national database and matching service on behalf of the Ministry of Justice. Intermediaries appointed through the WIS will be Registered Intermediary, recruited, trained and accredited by the Ministry of Justice. RIs work through the Witness Intermediary Scheme, run by the Ministry of Justice, which maintains a register of intermediaries, providing training and matching them with witnesses or victims. The legislation currently excludes defendants from using RIs. Instead they have to rely on what the High Court called ‘private and unregulated’ helpers

Vulnerable defendants frequently stand trial without the professional assistance they require. Defendants do not have access to the MoJ "Registered Intermediaries" but should still have access to intermediaries with skills not only in assisting with evidence giving, but also in helping the defendant to understand the case against them, instruct their legal team, and participate in the trial.

== Ground Rules Hearing ==
In preparation for trial, courts must take ‘every reasonable step’ to facilitate the participation of witnesses and defendants. One such step is the ground rules hearing: A pre-trial meeting of the trial judge, trial advocates and intermediary with the aim of deciding how someone who has communication needs or is otherwise vulnerable should be enabled to give their best evidence, or how a vulnerable defendant can participate effectively in the trial. 'Ground rules' for questioning must be discussed between the court, the advocates and the intermediary before giving evidence. GRHs are a form of case management hearing and discussion of ground rules is required in all intermediary trials. Intermediaries indicated the most important matters which needed to be discussed at a GRH:

i. The recommendations in the intermediary report/ going through the questioning recommendations

ii. When, and how often, breaks should occur (for the vulnerable person)

iii. How and when the intermediary should intervene / get the judge’s attention if there is a communication issue

iv. How to introduce and use communication aids

v. Strategies to keep the vulnerable person calm and engaged

vi. The role of the intermediary

vii. The relevant materials from The Advocates Gateway

viii. When the vulnerable person will practice with the video link (if used)

ix. When the judge and counsel will meet the vulnerable witness

x. The need for flexibility e.g. to have another GRH if the situation changes

== Intermediaries in Family Cases ==
The family courts are now more familiar in recent times with the concept of an intermediary being involved in cases where an individual may have Helping Individuals with Learning Disabilities. In family cases, most intermediaries will be operating outside the WIS and in these circumstances they will be non-registered intermediaries. The intermediary should be matched according to their communication specialism, their availability and, if possible, their geographic location. Funding must be agreed on a case-by-case basis as there is no standard procedure in Family Courts. Sometimes the cost of the intermediary is shared by the LAA, the court and the local authority. Sometimes it is funded solely by the court. Some intermediaries have reported a lack of clarity amongst practitioners about the role of the intermediary in family cases.

In the matter of D (A Child) [2014] EWFC 39 the President noted: ‘The mother and the father may require the use of an intermediary, not merely in the court setting but also, for example, when meeting professionals out of court'. Furthermore, with reference to the matter of A (A Child) [2013] EWHC 3502 the legal representatives should normally by the date of the case management hearing identify an agency to assist their client to give evidence through an intermediary or otherwise if the court concludes that such measures are required.

== Communicourt Code of Practice for NRI's ==
The primary responsibility of the Non-Registered Intermediary is to enable complete, coherent and accurate communication to take place between a defendant who requires special measures and the court

Non-Registered Intermediaries must have a clear and comprehensive understanding of the responsibilities and duties of their role within the criminal justice system, including their primary responsibility to the court

They must conduct themselves in court in a manner that facilitates accurate and coherent communication between the defendant and the court

They must respect at all times the authority and judgement of the court
