= Henry Chesbrough =

American business theorist

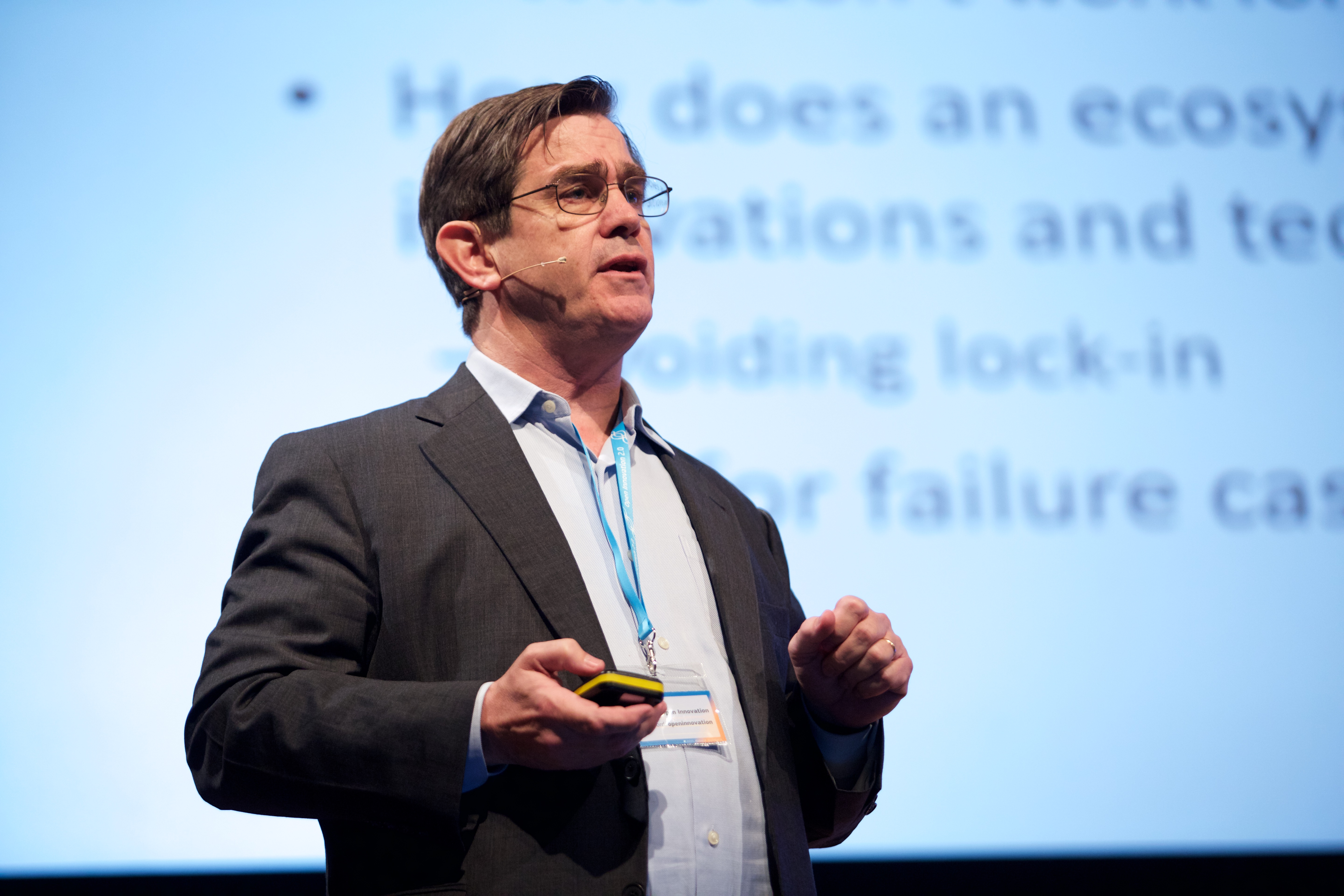
- Born: 1956 (age 69–70)
- Education: Yale University; Stanford Graduate School of Business; University of California, Berkeley
- Occupations: Professor and author
- Organization(s): Garwood Center for Corporate Innovation; University of California, Berkeley; Harvard Business School
- Known for: Open Innovation

Henry William Chesbrough (born 1956) is an American organizational theorist, adjunct professor and the faculty director of the Garwood Center for Corporate Innovation at the Haas School of Business at the University of California, Berkeley and Maire Tecnimont Chair of Open Innovation at Luiss. He is known for coining the term open innovation.

== Biography ==
Chesbrough holds a BA in Economics from Yale University, an MBA from Stanford Graduate School of Business, and a PhD from the Haas School of Business at the University of California, Berkeley.

He taught at the Harvard Business School as an assistant professor and Class of 1961 Fellow from 1997 to 2003. He is currently an adjunct professor and the faculty director of the Garwood Center for Corporate Innovation at the Haas School of Business at the University of California, Berkeley.

He acts as the chairman of the Open Innovation Center - Brazil. His first appearance in Brazil was in 2008, when he did a presentation in the Open Innovation Seminar 2008. He also acts as the chairman of board of advisors for Induct Software and appeared in Oslo on the 2011 Oslo Innovation Week

== Publications ==
- Open Innovation: The New Imperative for Creating and Profiting from Technology. HBS Press. 2003. ISBN 978-1422102831.
- Open Business Models: How to Thrive in the New Innovation Landscape. HBS Press. 2006. ISBN 978-1422104279.
- Open Innovation: Researching a New Paradigm. Oxford. 2006. ISBN 978-0199226467.
- Open Services Innovation: Rethinking Your Business to Grow and Compete in a New Era. Jossey-Bass. 2010. ISBN 978-0470905746.
- New Frontiers in Open Innovation. Oxford. 2014. ISBN 978-0199682461.
- Open Innovation Results. Oxford. 2020. ISBN 978-0198841906.
