= Appropriate adult =

Guardian or equivalent for contact purposes in English law

In English law, an appropriate adult is a parent, guardian or social worker, or if none of these is available, any responsible person over 18. The term was introduced as part of the policing reforms in the Police and Criminal Evidence Act 1984 and applies in England and Wales.

In England and Wales, an appropriate adult must be called by police whenever they detain or interview a child (under the age of 18) or a vulnerable adult. They must be present for a range of police processes, including interviews, intimate searches and identification procedures, as detailed in the Police and Criminal Evidence Act 1984 (PACE) Codes of Practice, primarily Code C.

== Details ==
Children

In relation to children, appropriate adult is defined in primary legislation under section 38(4)(a) of the Crime and Disorder Act 1998, which defines the role as being "to safeguard the interests of children and young persons detained or questioned by police officers". The Police and Criminal Evidence Act 1984 states in section 63B(10) that, in relation to a "juvenile" (under the age of 18) an appropriate adult should be:

(a) his parent or guardian or, if he is in the care of a local authority or voluntary organisation, a person representing that authority or organisation; or
(b) a social worker of a local authority; or
(c) if no person falling within paragraph (a) or (b) is available, any responsible person aged 18 or over who is not a police officer or a person employed by the police;

On 26 October 2015, amendments made to section 42 changed the age of "arrested juvenile" to "under 18".

Local authority Youth Offending Teams (YOTs) have a statutory duty to provide an appropriate adult for all children under the Crime and Disorder Act 1998 s.38(4)(a). This is carried out whenever parents are unavailable or unwilling to act as appropriate adult or it would not be appropriate for them to act in this capacity. Depending on the local authority, this may be carried out by YOT staff, sessional workers, community volunteers or contracted out to a specialist charity or business.

The role includes:

(a) To support, advise and assist the detained person, particularly while they are being questioned.
(b) To observe whether the police are acting properly, fairly and with respect for the rights of the detained person. And to tell them if you think they are not.
(c) To assist with communication between the detained person and the police.
(d) To ensure that the detained person understands their rights and that you have a role in protecting their rights.

Vulnerable adults

Appropriate adults are also required whenever mentally vulnerable adults are detained in custody. However, there is no statutory provision for vulnerable adults and formal schemes are not available in all parts of England and Wales.

Vulnerable defendants in Northern Ireland may also be able to access the services of a Registered Intermediary to facilitate communication while giving oral testimony at court,

Scotland

The role of appropriate adult in Scots law is different from that in England and Wales. Appropriate adults in Scotland facilitate communication between the police and adults (people aged 16 or over) who have a mental disorder. This is defined in the Mental Health (Care and Treatment) (Scotland) Act 2003 as "any mental illness, personality disorder, learning disability however caused or manifested". In practice this includes people with acquired brain injury, autistic spectrum disorder or dementia.

Many areas operate an 'Appropriate Adult Volunteer' scheme, where trained individuals volunteer their spare time to serve in this role. Many schemes operate on a rostered basis across weekends and sometimes week day evenings to expand the service outside of the hours provided by social workers.

== Issues regarding practice ==
- The role played by Janet Leach during and after the investigations and trial of a serial child murderer has been controversial.
- A 2020 report by the National Appropriate Adult Network (NAAN) found that police failed to provide an appropriate adult for hundreds of thousands of suspects with mental illness, autism or learning disabilities in 2019. NAAN's chief executive said this failure risked making evidence unreliable and leading to prosecutions being abandoned.

== National Appropriate Adult Network (NAAN) ==
NAAN is the national membership body supporting and representing appropriate adult services in England and Wales. NAAN has produced National Standard for AAs which were approved by the Home Office and Department of Health and Social Care in 2011. NAAN does not provide AA, but does represent them and provide training. NAAN states that AA role is underutilised, they believe around 39% of detainees may need an AA but in 2023 only 7.3% had one.

== Notable legal changes ==
On 26 October 2015 the British government used a statutory instrument (No. 1778/2015) to commence changes to section 42 (duties of custody officer after charge: arrested juveniles) of the Criminal Justice and Courts Act 2015.

The UN Convention on the Rights of the Child defines a child as under the age of 18; however, 17-year-olds in police custody in England and Wales fell into a grey area prior to the changes in Section 42.

In 2013, the Home Secretary ordered the amendment of PACE Code C to extend the requirement for an AA to 17-year-olds when detained or questioned by police.

Earlier in the year s.41 of the Criminal Justice and Courts Act made revisions to sections 66ZA and 66B of the Crime and Disorder Act 1998. This extended to 17-year-olds the requirement for an AA to be present for youth cautions and youth conditional cautions.

Section 42 of the Criminal Justice and Courts Act amends section 37(15) of the Police and Criminal Evidence Act 1984 (PACE). This is the section of PACE which defines "arrested juvenile", a term that is used in Part 4 of PACE, the part that relates to detention.

Until October 2015, PACE s.37(15) stated: "arrested juvenile" means a person arrested with or without a warrant who appears to be under the age of 17.

From October 2015, PACE s.37(15) states "arrested juvenile" means a person arrested with or without a warrant who appears to be under the age of 18.

The effect of the change is that 17-year-olds are included in the definition of "arrested juvenile". This means that, as with all other children: -

- Under s.38 (1) 17-year-olds may now be detained after charge if the custody officer has reasonable grounds for believing that they ought to be detained in their own interests.
- Under s.38 (6) 17-year-olds who are detained post charge must be transferred to local authority accommodation
- Under s.38 (6B) it is lawful for any person acting on behalf of the authority to detain a 17-year-old who has been transferred to local authority accommodation under s.38 (6)
- Under s.38 (7) if the police cannot transfer as per the above due to 'impracticability' or lack of secure accommodation (where non-secure would not be adequate due to the risk of serious harm to the public), they must present a certificate to the court.

Although PACE Code C has been amended to require the presence of an AA for 17-year-olds, this is not yet in written in legislation. PACE 1984 s.63B (Testing for presence of Class A drugs) an AA must be present when police make the request, give a warning and information and take a sample "in the case of a person who has not attained the age of 17". The term "appropriate adult" is defined only in relation to a person who has "not attained the age of 17". The PACE Codes still have to be followed even though they are not law.

== See also ==
- Timeline of children's rights in the United Kingdom
