= Defendant =

Accused person

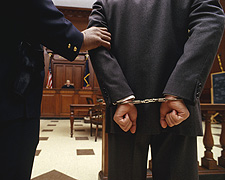
Cuffed defendant before criminal court (Transportation Security Administration image)

In court proceedings, a defendant is a person or object who is the party either accused of committing a crime in criminal prosecution or against whom some type of civil relief is being sought in a civil case.

Terminology varies from one jurisdiction to another. In Scots law, the terms "accused" or "panel" are used instead in criminal proceedings and "defender" in civil proceedings. Another term in use is "respondent".

== Criminal defendants ==
In a criminal trial, a defendant is a person accused (charged) of committing an offense (a crime; an act defined as punishable under criminal law). The other party to a criminal trial is usually a public prosecutor, but in some jurisdictions, private prosecutions are allowed.

Criminal defendants are often taken into custody by police and brought before a court under an arrest warrant. Criminal defendants are usually obliged to post bail before being released from custody. For serious cases, such as murder, bail may be refused. Defendants must be present at every stage of the proceedings against them. (There is an exception for very minor cases such as traffic offenses in jurisdictions that treat them as crimes.)

If more than one person is accused, the people may be referred as "co-defendant" or "co-conspirator" in English and common law courts.

In some jurisdictions, vulnerable defendants may be able to access the services of a non-registered intermediary to assist with communication at court.

== Civil defendants ==
In a civil lawsuit, a defendant (or a respondent) is also the accused party, although not of an offense, but of a civil wrong (a tort or a breach of contract, for instance). The person who starts the civil action through filing a complaint is referred to as the plaintiff (also known as the appellant).

Defendants in civil actions usually make their first court appearance voluntarily in response to a summons. Historically, civil defendants could be taken into custody under a writ of capias ad respondendum. Modern-day civil defendants are usually able to avoid most (if not all) court appearances if represented by a lawyer.

Most often and familiarly, defendants are persons: either natural persons (actual human beings) or juridical persons (persona fiction) under the legal fiction of treating organizations as persons. But a defendant may be an object, in which case the object itself is the direct subject of the action. When a court has jurisdiction over an object, it is said to have jurisdiction in rem. An example of an in rem case is United States v. Forty Barrels and Twenty Kegs of Coca-Cola (1916), where the defendant was not the Coca-Cola Company itself, but rather "Forty Barrels and Twenty Kegs of Coca-Cola". In current United States legal practice, in rem suits are primarily asset forfeiture cases, based on drug laws, as in USA v. $124,700 (2006).

Defendants can set up an account to pay for litigation costs and legal expenses. These legal defense funds can have large membership counts where members contribute to the fund. The fund can be public or private and is set up for individuals, organizations, or a particular purpose. These funds are often used by public officials, civil-rights organizations, and public-interest organizations.

== England and Wales ==
Historically, "defendant" was a legal term for a person prosecuted for misdemeanour. It was not applicable to a person prosecuted for felony.

== See also ==
- Asset forfeiture
- Attribution (law)
- Criminal procedure
- Trial
