= Open innovation =

Term for external cooperation in innovation

Open innovation is a term used to promote an Information Age mindset toward innovation that runs counter to the secrecy and silo mentality of traditional corporate research labs. The benefits and driving forces behind increased openness have been noted and discussed as far back as the 1960s, especially as it pertains to interfirm cooperation in R&D. Use of the term 'open innovation' in reference to the increasing embrace of external cooperation in a complex world has been promoted in particular by Henry Chesbrough, adjunct professor and faculty director of the Center for Open Innovation of the Haas School of Business at the University of California, and Maire Tecnimont Chair of Open Innovation at Luiss.

The term was originally referred to as "a paradigm that assumes that firms can and should use external ideas as well as internal ideas, and internal and external paths to market, as the firms look to advance their technology". More recently, it is defined as "a distributed innovation process based on purposively managed knowledge flows across organizational boundaries, using pecuniary and non-pecuniary mechanisms in line with the organization's business model". This more recent definition acknowledges that open innovation is not solely firm-centric: it also includes creative consumers and communities of user innovators. The boundaries between a firm and its environment have become more permeable; innovations can easily transfer inward and outward between firms and other firms and between firms and creative consumers, resulting in impacts at the level of the consumer, the firm, an industry, and society.

Because innovations tend to be produced by outsiders and founders in startups, rather than existing organizations, the central idea behind open innovation is that, in a world of widely distributed knowledge, companies cannot afford to rely entirely on their own research, but should instead buy or license processes or inventions (i.e. patents) from other companies. This is termed inbound open innovation. In addition, internal inventions not being used in a firm's business should be taken outside the company (e.g. through licensing, joint ventures or spin-offs). This is called outbound open innovation.

The open innovation paradigm can be interpreted to go beyond just using external sources of innovation such as customers, rival companies, and academic institutions, and can be as much a change in the use, management, and employment of intellectual property as it is in the technical and research driven generation of intellectual property. In this sense, it is understood as the systematic encouragement and exploration of a wide range of internal and external sources for innovative opportunities, the integration of this exploration with firm capabilities and resources, and the exploitation of these opportunities through multiple channels.

In addition, as open innovation explores a wide range of internal and external sources, it could be not just analyzed in the level of company, but also it can be analyzed at inter-organizational level, intra-organizational level, extra-organizational and at industrial, regional and society.

== Advantages ==
Open innovation offers several benefits to companies operating on a program of global collaboration:

- Reduced cost of conducting research and development
- Potential for improvement in development productivity
- Incorporation of customers early in the development process
- Increase in accuracy for market research and customer targeting
- Improve the performance in planning and delivering projects
- Potential for synergism between internal and external innovations
- Potential for viral marketing
- Enhanced digital transformation
- Potential for completely new business models
- Leveraging of innovation ecosystems

== Disadvantages ==
Implementing a model of open innovation is naturally associated with a number of risks and challenges, including:

- Possibility of revealing information not intended for sharing
- Potential for the hosting organization to lose their competitive advantage as a consequence of revealing intellectual property
- Increased complexity of controlling innovation and regulating how contributors affect a project
- Devising a means to properly identify and incorporate external innovation
- Realigning innovation strategies to extend beyond the firm in order to maximize the return from external innovation
- The addition of perspectives that may contradict your own

== Models ==
=== Government driven ===
In the UK, knowledge transfer partnerships (KTP) are a funding mechanism encouraging the partnership between a firm and a knowledge-based partner. A KTP is a collaboration program between a knowledge-based partner (i.e. a research institution), a company partner and one or more associates (i.e. recently qualified persons such as graduates). KTP initiatives aim to deliver significant improvement in business partners' profitability as a direct result of the partnership through enhanced quality and operations, increased sales and access to new markets. At the end of their KTP project, the three actors involved have to prepare a final report that describes KTP initiative supported the achievement of the project's innovation goals.

=== In Startup Culture ===
Open innovation has allowed startup companies to produce innovation comparable to that of large companies. Although startups tend to have limited resources and experience, they can overcome this disadvantage by leveraging external resources and knowledge. To do so, startups can work in tandem with other institutions including large companies, incubators, VC firms, and higher education systems. Collaborating with these institutions provides startups with the proper resources and support to successfully bring new innovations to the market.

The collaboration between startups and large companies, in particular, has been used to exemplify the fruits of open innovation. In this collaboration, startups can assume one of two roles: that of inbound open innovation, where the startup utilizes innovation from the large company, or that of outbound open innovation, where the startup provides internal innovation for the large company. In the inbound open innovation model, startups can gain access to technology that will allow them to create successful products. In the outbound innovation model, startups can capitalize on their technology without making large investments to do so. The licensing of technology between startups and large companies is beneficial for both parties, but it is more significant for startups since they face larger obstacles in their pursuit of innovation.

=== Product platforming ===
This approach involves developing and introducing a partially completed product, for the purpose of providing a framework or tool-kit for contributors to access, customize, and exploit. The goal is for the contributors to extend the platform product's functionality while increasing the overall value of the product for everyone involved.

Readily available software frameworks such as a software development kit (SDK), or an application programming interface (API) are common examples of product platforms. This approach is common in markets with strong network effects where demand for the product implementing the framework (such as a mobile phone, or an online application) increases with the number of developers that are attracted to use the platform tool-kit. The high scalability of platforming often results in an increased complexity of administration and quality assurance.

=== Idea competitions ===
This model entails implementing a system that encourages competitiveness among contributors by rewarding successful submissions. Developer competitions such as hackathon events and many crowdsourcing initiatives fall under this category of open innovation. This method provides organizations with inexpensive access to a large quantity of innovative ideas, while also providing a deeper insight into the needs of their customers and contributors.

=== Customer immersion ===
While mostly oriented toward the end of the product development cycle, this technique involves extensive customer interaction through employees of the host organization. Companies are thus able to accurately incorporate customer input, while also allowing them to be more closely involved in the design process and product management cycle.

=== Collaborative product design and development ===
Similarly to product platforming, an organization incorporates their contributors into the development of the product. This differs from platforming in the sense that, in addition to the provision of the framework on which contributors develop, the hosting organization still controls and maintains the eventual products developed in collaboration with their contributors. This method gives organizations more control by ensuring that the correct product is developed as fast as possible, while reducing the overall cost of development. Dr. Henry Chesbrough recently supported this model for open innovation in the optics and photonics industry.

=== Innovation networks ===
Similarly to idea competitions, an organization leverages a network of contributors in the design process by offering a reward in the form of an incentive. The difference relates to the fact that the network of contributors are used to develop solutions to identified problems within the development process, as opposed to new products. Emphasis needs to be placed on assessing organisational capabilities to ensure value creation in open innovation.

=== In science ===
In Austria the Ludwig Boltzmann Gesellschaft started a project named "Tell us!" about mental health issues and used the concept of open innovation to crowdsource research questions. The institute also launched the first "Lab for Open Innovation in Science" to teach 20 selected scientists the concept of open innovation over the course of one year.

=== Innovation intermediaries ===
Innovation intermediaries are persons or organizations that facilitate innovation by linking multiple independent players in order to encourage collaboration and open innovation, thus strengthening the innovation capacity of companies, industries, regions, or nations. As such, they may be key players for the transformation from closed to open modes of innovation.

== Versus closed innovation ==
The paradigm of closed innovation holds that successful innovation requires control. Particularly, a company should control the generation of their own ideas, as well as production, marketing, distribution, servicing, financing, and supporting. What drove this idea is that, in the early twentieth century, academic and government institutions were not involved in the commercial application of science. As a result, it was left up to other corporations to take the new product development cycle into their own hands. There just was not the time to wait for the scientific community to become more involved in the practical application of science. There also was not enough time to wait for other companies to start producing some of the components that were required in their final product. These companies became relatively self-sufficient, with little communication directed outwards to other companies or universities.

Throughout the years several factors emerged that paved the way for open innovation paradigms:

- The increasing availability and mobility of skilled workers
- The growth of the venture capital market
- External options for ideas sitting on the shelf
- The increasing capability of external suppliers

These four factors have resulted in a new market of knowledge. Knowledge is not anymore proprietary to the company. It resides in employees, suppliers, customers, competitors and universities. If companies do not use the knowledge they have inside, someone else will. Innovation can be generated either by means of closed innovation or by open innovation paradigms. Some research argues that the potential of open innovation is exaggerated, while the merits of closed innovation are overlooked. There is an ongoing debate on which paradigm will dominate in the future.

== Terminology ==
Modern research of open innovation is divided into two groups, which have several names, but are similar in their essence (discovery and exploitation; outside-in and inside-out; inbound and outbound). The common factor for different names is the direction of innovation, whether from outside the company in, or from inside the company out:

Revealing (non-pecuniary outbound innovation)

This type of open innovation is when a company freely shares its resources with other partners, without an instant financial reward. The source of profit has an indirect nature and is manifested as a new type of business model.

Selling (pecuniary outbound innovation)

In this type of open innovation a company commercialises its inventions and technology through selling or licensing technology to a third party.

Sourcing (non-pecuniary inbound innovation)

This type of open innovation is when companies use freely available external knowledge, as a source of internal innovation. Before starting any internal R&D project a company should monitor the external environment in search for existing solutions, thus, in this case, internal R&D become tools to absorb external ideas for internal needs.

Acquiring (pecuniary inbound innovation)

In this type of open innovation a company is buying innovation from its partners through licensing, or other procedures, involving monetary reward for external knowledge

== Versus open source ==
Open source and open innovation might conflict on patent issues. This conflict is particularly apparent when considering technologies that may save lives, or other open-source-appropriate technologies that may assist in poverty reduction or sustainable development. However, open source and open innovation are not mutually exclusive, because participating companies can donate their patents to an independent organization, put them in a common pool, or grant unlimited license use to anybody. Hence some open-source initiatives can merge these two concepts: this is the case for instance for IBM with its Eclipse platform, which the company presents as a case of open innovation, where competing companies are invited to cooperate inside an open-innovation network.

In 1997, Eric Raymond, writing about the open-source software movement, coined the term the cathedral and the bazaar. The cathedral represented the conventional method of employing a group of experts to design and develop software (though it could apply to any large-scale creative or innovative work). The bazaar represented the open-source approach. This idea has been amplified by a lot of people, notably Don Tapscott and Anthony D. Williams in their book Wikinomics. Eric Raymond himself is also quoted as saying that 'one cannot code from the ground up in bazaar style. One can test, debug, and improve in bazaar style, but it would be very hard to originate a project in bazaar mode'. In the same vein, Raymond is also quoted as saying 'The individual wizard is where successful bazaar projects generally start'.

== The next level ==
In 2014, Chesbrough and Bogers describe open innovation as a distributed innovation process that is based on purposefully managed knowledge flows across enterprise boundaries. Open innovation is hardly aligned with the ecosystem theory and not a linear process. Fasnacht's adoption for the financial services uses open innovation as basis and includes alternative forms of mass collaboration, hence, this makes it complex, iterative, non-linear, and barely controllable. The increasing interactions between business partners, competitors, suppliers, customers, and communities create a constant growth of data and cognitive tools. Open innovation ecosystems bring together the symbiotic forces of all supportive firms from various sectors and businesses that collectively seek to create differentiated offerings. Accordingly, the value captured from a network of multiple actors and the linear value chain of individual firms combined, creates the new delivery model that Fasnacht declares "value constellation".

== Open innovation ecosystem ==
The term Open Innovation Ecosystem consists of three parts that describe the foundations of the approach of open innovation, innovation systems and business ecosystems.

While James F. Moore researched business ecosystems in manufacturing around a specific business or branch, the open model of innovation with the ecosystem theory was recently studied in various industries. Traitler et al. researched it 2010 and used it for R&D, stating that global innovation needs alliances based on compatible differences. Innovation partnerships based on sharing knowledge represents a paradigm shift toward accelerating co‐development of sustainable innovation. West researched open innovation ecosystems in the software industry, following studies in the food industry that show how a small firm thrived and became a business success based on building an ecosystem that shares knowledge, encourages individuals' growth, and embeds trust among participants such as suppliers, alumni chef and staff, and food writers. Other adoptions include the telecom industry or smart cities.

Ecosystems foster collaboration and accelerate the dissemination of knowledge through the network effect, in fact, value creation increases with each actor in the ecosystem, which in turn nurtures the ecosystem as such.

A digital platform is essential to make the innovation ecosystem work as it aligns various actors to achieve a mutually beneficial purpose. Parker explained that with platform revolution and described how networked Markets are transforming the economy. Basically there are three dimensions that increasingly converge, i.e. e-commerce, social media and logistics and finance, termed by Daniel Fasnacht as the golden triangle of ecosystems.

Business ecosystems are increasingly used and drive digital growth.[3] Pioneering firms in China use their technological capabilities and link client data to historical transactions and social behaviour to offer tailored financial services among luxury goods or health services. Such open collaborative environment changes the client experience and adds value to consumers. The drawback is that it is also threatening incumbent banks from the U.S. and Europe due to its legacies and lack of agility and flexibility.

== Ecosystem-driven open innovation ==
Ecosystem-driven open innovation describes an evolution of open innovation from firm-centric collaboration to the orchestration of multi-actor ecosystems—including corporations, startups, universities, investors, government agencies and user communities—aimed at solving complex, system-level challenges. Rather than focusing only on inbound/outbound knowledge flows between single organizations, this approach emphasizes shared problem framing, common infrastructure (e.g., data spaces, reference architectures), pooled IP mechanisms, and governance models that enable sustained value creation across the network. The formulation has been articulated in practice by innovation practitioner Giancarlo Falconi Canepa (GFC).

Key features commonly associated with ecosystem-driven open innovation include:

- Ecosystem orchestration roles (e.g., neutral conveners, platform operators) that coordinate incentives and standards;
- Challenge-led programs (e.g., public procurement of innovation, regulatory sandboxes) that align multiple actors around mission-oriented goals;
- Collective capability building (e.g., testbeds, living labs, pre-competitive consortia) to reduce risk and accelerate diffusion;
- Health metrics for ecosystems (e.g., participation diversity, time-to-pilot, asset reuse, spillovers) complementing firm-level KPIs such as R&D productivity.

A concise formulation sometimes used in practice is:

"Open innovation at ecosystem scale is the shift from bilateral exchange to the co-creation and governance of shared assets that any participant can build upon." — Giancarlo Falconi Canepa (GFC), 2025.

This perspective extends prior models (inbound/outbound, platforming, intermediaries) by foregrounding systemic outcomes (industry, regional and societal levels) and by treating governance, shared infrastructure and mission alignment as first-class design variables within open innovation.

== See also ==
- Category:Open innovation intermediaries
- Collaborative innovation network – Practice that uses internet platforms to promote communication within virtual teams
- Collaborative network
- Frugal innovation – Process of reducing the complexity and cost of a good and its production
- Ideas bank – Sourcing services or funds from a group
- Innovation – Practical implementation of improvements
- Innovation intermediary – Concept in innovation studies
- Open-source appropriate technology – Appropriate technology from the open-design movement
- Open data – Openly accessible data
- Open research – Research made available to the public
- Open-source hardware – Hardware whose design source files are made available
- TED (conference) – American-Canadian organization of conferences
