= 1991 New Year Honours =

British royal recognitions

The New Year Honours 1991 were appointments by Queen Elizabeth II to various orders and honours to reward and highlight good works by people of the United Kingdom and Commonwealth. They were published on 28 December 1990 for the United Kingdom, New Zealand and the Cook Islands, Mauritius, the Bahamas, Grenada, Papua New Guinea, the Solomon Islands, Tuvalu, Saint Vincent and the Grenadines, Belize, Antigua and Barbuda, and Saint Christopher and Nevis.

The recipients of honours are displayed here as they were styled before their new honour, and arranged by honour, with classes (Knight, Knight Grand Cross, etc.) and then divisions (Military, Civil, etc.) as appropriate.

== United Kingdom ==
=== Life peer ===
- Miss Phyllis Dorothy James (Mrs White), OBE, Author.

=== Privy Counsellors ===
- The Honourable Alan Kenneth McKenzie Clark, MP, Minister of State, Ministry of Defence; Member of Parliament, Plymouth Sutton.
- Angela Claire Rosemary, Mrs Rumbold, CBE, MP, Minister of State, Department of Education and Science; Member of Parliament, Mitcham and Morden.

=== Knights Bachelor ===
- Cyril James Anderton, CBE, QPM, Chief Constable, Greater Manchester Police.
- Colin Barker, Chairman, British Technology Group.
- Jeffery Haverstock Bowman, Senior Partner, Price Waterhouse.
- Professor John Ivan George Cadogan, CBE, Director of Research, British Petroleum
- Frederick Howard Michael Craig-Cooper, CBE, TD. For political service.
- Robert Anthony Bevis (Tony) Durant, MP. For political service.
- Michael Anthony Epstein, CBE, Emeritus Professor of Pathology, University of Bristol; Fellow of Wolfson College, Oxford and Foreign Secretary, The Royal Society.
- Colonel James Dennis Compton Faulkner, CBE, VRD. For public services.
- Paul Leonard Fox, CBE, Managing Director, Network Television, British Broadcasting Corporation.
- Professor John Frank Kermode. For services to Literature.
- William Charles Leech, CBE. For charitable services.
- Maurice Sydney Lipworth, Chairman, Monopolies and Mergers Commission.
- The Right Honourable Richard Napier Luce, MP. For political service.
- Tom McDonald, OBE, Chairman, West Yorkshire and West Midlands Residuary Bodies.
- Ian Murray McKellen, CBE, Actor.
- Robert Alastair Newton Morton, Deputy Chairman and Chief Executive, Eurotunnel Group; Chairman, Eurotunnel plc.
- Andrzej Panufnik, Composer and Conductor.
- Eric Parker, Deputy Chairman and Group Chief Executive, Trafalgar House plc.
- The Right Honourable Timothy (Hugh Francis) Raison, MP. For political service.
- Lewis Robertson, CBE For services to Industry.
- Jeremy Rowe, CBE, Chairman, Occupational Pensions Board.
- Patrick Sheehy, Chairman, BAT Industries.
- Andrew Kirkpatrick Sloan, QPM, Chief Constable, Strathclyde Police.
- Professor Michael Warwick Thompson, Vice-Chancellor and Principal, University of Birmingham.
- William Benjamin Utting, CB, Chief Inspector, Social Services Inspectorate.
- Colin John Shedlock Walker, OBE, Chairman, East Anglian Regional Health Authority.
- David Alan Walker, Chairman, Securities and Investments Board.
- Peregrine Gerard Worsthorne. For services to Journalism.
- Ian William Wrigglesworth. For political and public service.

=== Order of the Bath ===
==== Knights Grand Cross (GCB) ====
Military Division

Royal Navy

- Admiral Sir Benjamin Bathurst, KCB

Civil Division

- Sir Michael Quinlan, KCB, Permanent Under-Secretary of State, Ministry of Defence.

==== Knights Commander (KCB) ====
Military Division

Royal Navy

- Lieutenant-General Henry York La Roche Beverley, OBE

Army

- Lieutenant-General Richard Hull Swinburn, late 17th/21st Lancers.
- Lieutenant-General Michael John Wilkes, CBE, Colonel Commandant, Royal Regiment of Artillery.
- Lieutenant-General John Finlay Willasey Wilsey, CBE, Colonel, The Devon and Dorset Regiment; Colonel Commandant, Army Catering Corps.

Civil Division

- Derek Henry Andrews, CB, CBE, Permanent Secretary, Ministry of Agriculture, Fisheries and Food.
- John Caines, CB, Permanent Secretary, Department of Education and Science.
- The Right Honourable Sir Robert Fellowes, KCVO, CB, Private Secretary to the Queen.
- Allan David Green, QC, Director of Public Prosecutions.

==== Companions (CB) ====
Military Division

Royal Navy

- Rear-Admiral Christopher Hope Layman DSO, LVO.
- Surgeon Rear-Admiral Ronald Edward Snow, LVO, OBE, QHP
- Rear-Admiral Christopher Lainson Wood.

Army

- Major-General Colin Edward George Carrington, CBE, Colonel Commandant, Royal Corps of Transport.
- Major-General Robert John Swan Corbett, late Irish Guards.
- Major-General John Peter William Friedberger, CBE, Colonel, The Royal Hussars, (Prince of Wales's Own).
- Major-General Richard Leslie Peck, late Corps of Royal Engineers.
- Major-General Dennis Shaw, CBE, late Corps of Royal Electrical and Mechanical Engineers.

Royal Air Force

- Air Vice-Marshal Robert John Honey, CBE
- Air Vice-Marshal John Frederick Willis, CBE
- Air Vice-Marshal William John Wratten, CBE, AFC

Civil Division

- Alexander Gilmour Bell, Chief Reporter, Scottish Office.
- Edwin Geoffrey Bowman, Parliamentary Counsel.
- Ronald Frederick Coleman, Chief Engineer and Scientist, Department of Trade and Industry.
- Michael John Mackey Erritt, Grade 3, Central Statistical Office.
- David Allen Hadley, Deputy Secretary, Cabinet Office.
- John Langdon Heritage, Head of Judicial Appointments Group, Lord Chancellor's Department.
- Brian Thomas Houghton, Grade 3, Board of Inland Revenue.
- The Reverend James Gordon Medcalf, Deputy Solicitor, Legal Directorate, Department of the Environment.
- Geoffrey Thomas Morgan, Grade 3, Cabinet Office.
- Martin Trevor Peters, Director, Royal Aerospace Establishment, Farnborough.
- Owen Rees, Grade 3, Welsh Office.
- Malcolm George Stephens, Chief Executive, Export Credits Guarantee Department.
- Valerie Patricia Marie Strachan, Deputy Chairman, Board of HM Customs and Excise.
- John Francis Sweetman, TD, Clerk of Committees, The House of Commons.
- Alan Harry Turney, Assistant Under-Secretary of State, Home Office.
- Ivan Harold Nutt Wallace, Senior Chief Inspector, Department of Education (Northern Ireland).
- Richard Thomas James Wilson, Deputy Secretary, HM Treasury.

=== Order of St Michael and St George ===
==== Companions (CMG) ====
- David William Brocklesby, lately Professor of Tropical Animal Health; Director of the Centre for Tropical Veterinary Medicine.
- John Arnfield Heap, Head of the Polar Regions Section, Foreign and Commonwealth Office.

=== Royal Victorian Order ===
==== Knight Grand Cross (GCVO) ====
- Major-General Sir Walter Arthur George Burns, KCVO, CB, DSO, OBE, MC

==== Knights Commander (KCVO) ====
- Captain Richard Arthur Frederick Dobbs.
- Lieutenant-Colonel Hanmer Cecil Hanbury, LVO
- Sir John Nicholas Henderson, GCMG
- Julian St John Loyd, CVO
- Lieutenant-General Sir John Charles Chisholm Richards, KCB, CVO

==== Commanders (CVO) ====
- David Michael Dixon.
- Major-General Roy Laurence Cayley Dixon, CB, MC
- Major Michael John Parker, MBE.
- Susan Louise Wigley, LVO

==== Lieutenants (LVO) ====
- Davina Mary, The Countess Alexander of Tunis.
- Paul George Canham.
- Commander Hugh Douglas Younger Faulkner.
- John Eric Handcock.
- John Richard Hickish.
- Chief Superintendent Alfred Ernest Frederick Longhurst, Metropolitan Police.
- Sarah Elizabeth Anne Marsh, MVO

==== Members (MVO) ====
- Peter Graham Cooke.
- Richard Laurence Fitch.
- Squadron Leader David Warwick Gale, Royal Air Force.
- James Murray Grant.
- George Albert Griffiths.
- Squadron Leader Denis Laurence Mooney, Royal Air Force.
- Miss Rachel Anne Wells.
- Lieutenant-Colonel Donald James Charles Wickes.
- Captain Edward Patrick Whealing, Royal Marines.

=== Royal Victorian Medal ===
==== Silver ====
- Gladys Byworth.
- Roy Couch.
- Chief Technician John Entwhistle, A. ENG TECH A/P., Royal Air Force.
- Audrey French.
- Marine Steven Gilson, Royal Marines.
- Walter Gimpel.
- Robin Michael Hampstead.
- Andrew Littlejohn Kemp.
- Chief Technician Robert Holden Pinch, A. TECH E., Royal Air Force.
- Acting Petty Officer Marine Engineering Mechanic (Mechanical) Richard Wilfred Simpkins, Royal Navy.
- Raymond Slater.
- Joan Taylor.
- Frank Webb.

=== Order of the British Empire ===
==== Dames Commander (DBE) ====
Civil Division

- Barbara Cartland, Novelist.
- Shirley, Lady Porter, DL. For political and public service.
- Victoire Evelyn Patricia, Lady Ridsdale. For political service.
- Lucie Rie, CBE, Potter.
- Professor Margaret Elizabeth Harvey Turner-Warwick, President, Royal College of Physicians.

==== Knights Commander (KBE) ====
Military Division

Royal Navy

- Vice-Admiral Robert Charles Finch Hill.

Royal Air Force

- Air Marshal Nigel Holroyd Mills, QHP, CBE

Civil Division

- Bertram Stanley Mitford Bowyer, Lord Denham, PC. For political service.
- Terence Alexander Hawthorne English, President, Royal College of Surgeons of England.

==== Commanders (CBE) ====
Military Division

Royal Navy

- Commandant Anthea Larken, ADC, Women's Royal Naval Service.
- Captain Donald Andrew McVean.
- Colonel Ian Melville Hume Moore, ADC.
- Captain Hugh Peltor.

Army

- Brigadier Michael William Betts, ADC, late Royal Corps of Transport.
- Brigadier John Barry Bloxham, Army Catering Corps.
- Brigadier Geoffrey Robert Durrant, MBE, QHVS, late Royal Army Veterinary Corps.
- Colonel John Vivian Fielding, late Royal Corps of Signals.
- Colonel Timothy John Granville-Chapman, late Royal Regiment of Artillery.
- Brigadier Alasdair Ian Gordon Kennedy, OBE, late the Gordon Highlanders.
- Colonel Edward James Pepper, late the Royal Tank Regiment.
- Colonel Alan Hackford Protheroe, MBE, TD, late The Royal Regiment of Wales, (24th/41st Foot), Territorial Army; Honorary Colonel, Territorial Army Public Information Pool.

Royal Air Force

- Air Commodore John Anthony Cheshire, OBE
- Group Captain Joseph Charles French, OBE, ADC
- Group Captain Richard Hugh Gould.
- Group Captain John Edward Rooum, AFC
- Air Commodore George Edward Winch (Ret'd).

Civil Division

- William Anderson, Managing Editor, D. C. Thomson & Co.
- Anthony David Andrews, Deputy Managing Director, Bookers Seeds.
- John Trevor Arnett, DL, Deputy Leader, Hereford and Worcester County Council.
- Ronald Edward Artus, lately Group Chief Investment Manager and Director, Prudential Corporation plc.
- Susan Baird, Lord Provost, City of Glasgow District Council.
- Rosemary Dawn Bayman. For political service.
- John Bingham, lately Senior Manager, Head of Wheat Breeding Group, Plant Breeding International Cambridge Ltd.
- Malcolm Stanley Bradbury, Author, Professor of American Studies, University of East Anglia.
- John Brennan, Director of Works Service, Department of the Environment, Northern Ireland.
- June Paterson-Brown, DL, lately Chief Commissioner, The Girl Guides Association.
- John Roger Carr, Chairman, Countryside Commission for Scotland.
- George Hubert Challis, Chief Commoner, Corporation of London.
- Professor Christine Muriel Chapman, OBE, lately Chairman, Welsh National Board for Nursing, Midwifery and Health Visiting.
- John Gerald Collee, Robert Irvine Professor of Bacteriology, Department of Medical Microbiology, University of Edinburgh Medical School; Chief Bacteriologist, Edinburgh Royal Infirmary.
- Brian David Cooper, Principal Medical Officer, HM Prison Parkhurst.
- Ian Leonard Dixon. For political and public service.
- Francis Albert Edgar, Deputy Director, Northern Ireland Court Service.
- Anthony Joseph Eggington, Director Programmes and Deputy Chairman, Science and Engineering Research Council.
- Grahame Nicholas Elliott. For political and public service.
- Miss Valerie Jean Evans, lately Divisional Staff Inspector, Department of Education and Science.
- Dennis Larry Ashwell Farr, Director, Courtauld Institute, Galleries.
- Trevor Maurice Farrer. For political and public service.
- Albert John Figes, lately Grade 4, Ministry of Defence.
- Neil James Fitton, lately Director of Education, Cheshire.
- Kester William Norton George, Grade 4, Department of Trade and Industry.
- Sydney Gillibrand, Chairman, Aerospace Companies, British Aerospace plc.
- Mary Burnell Clark-Glass, Chair and Chief Executive, Equal Opportunities Commission, Northern Ireland.
- Marius Goring, Actor/Manager.
- Ida Haendel, Violinist.
- James MacDougall Graham Harley, Professor of Clinical Obstetrics and Gynaecology, Queen's University Belfast.
- Anthony Harry Hart, Leader, Kent County Council.
- Michael Herbert, Chairman and Chief Executive, The Tussauds Group Ltd.
- Leonard William Hodgson, MBE. For political and public service.
- The Honourable David Alexander Cospatrick Douglas-Home, Chairman, Committee for Middle East Trade. For services to Export.
- William Nicholas Hood, Chairman, Wessex Water plc.
- David John Hopkins, lately City Treasurer, Westminster City Council.
- Ronald Walter Howard, Chairman, GEC Avionics Ltd.
- David John Edward Ingram, Vice-Chancellor, University of Kent.
- Adrian Alexander Ward-Jackson. For services to the performing arts especially dance.
- Roland John Jarvis, Group Chief Executive, Low and Bonar plc, Dundee.
- Geoffrey Richards John, Chairman, Meat and Livestock Commission.
- Francis Frederick Johnson, Architect; Member, Executive Committee, The Georgian Group.
- Brian Alexander Johnston, MC, OBE. For services to Broadcasting.
- David Robert Corbett Kelly. For political and public service.
- Professor Charles Kemball, Honorary Fellow, Edinburgh University, President, The Royal Society of Edinburgh.
- Richard Ashton King, lately Group Chief Executive, Cambridge Electronic Industries plc.
- Richard Charles Maurice Learner, Vice-Chairman, Remploy, Ltd.
- Celia Jean, Lady Liggins, OBE. For political service.
- Sylvia Rosalind, Countess of Limerick, Vice-Chairman, Foundation for the Study of Infant Deaths.
- Robert Andrew Lloyd, Opera Singer.
- Stephen Penford Lock, Editor, British Medical Journal.
- Maitland Mackie. For services to Agriculture.
- Donald Francis MacQuaker, Chairman, Scottish Health Service, Common Services Agency.
- Ronald McCaughan, Grade 4, Ministry of Defence.
- Samuel Edward McClelland, HM Deputy Senior Chief Inspector of Schools, Scotland.
- Sidney Aubrey Melman, lately Chairman, Letchworth Garden City Corporation.
- Robert Joel Montague, Executive Chairman, Tiphook plc.
- Peter Moores, For charitable services to the Arts.
- Roger Hugh Vaughan Charles Morgan, Librarian, House of Lords.
- Major Sir Marc Brunel Noble, Bt., Commonwealth Commissioner, The Scout Association.
- Professor John Robert Norris, Director of Group Research, Cadbury-Schweppes plc.
- Alfred John O'Sullivan. For political service.
- Gordon Michael William Owen, Group Managing Director, Cable and Wireless plc; Chairman, Mercury Communications Ltd.
- The Reverend Canon William James Patterson, lately Dean of Ely, Cambridgeshire.
- William Michael Peacock, Chairman, Nurdin and Peacock plc.
- Donald Hill Perkins, Professor of Elementary Particle Physics; Head of Nuclear Physics Department, University of Oxford.
- Anthony Michael Westlake Platt, Chief Executive, London Chamber of Commerce & Industry. For services to Export.
- Barry David Keith Price, QPM, National Drugs Intelligence Co-ordinator.
- Kenneth Punt, Director of Finance, Trent Regional Health Authority.
- David Caie Rennie, Chairman, Management Side, Ambulance Whitley Council; Chairman, Harrow Health Authority.
- James Michael Renshall, OBE, lately Chairman, Accounting Standards Committee.
- Robert William Robson, lately Manager, England Association Football Team.
- Thomas Gordon Parry Rogers, Chairman, Business and Technician Education Council.
- Geoffrey Arthur Rose, Professor of Epidemiology, London School of Hygiene & Tropical Medicine.
- Jeffrey David Rose, Chairman, The Royal Automobile Club.
- Raman Subba Row, lately Chairman, Test and County Cricket Board.
- Timothy William Baines Sallitt, lately Deputy Chairman, Export Guarantees Advisory Council, Board Director, Hawker Siddeley, Group.
- James Edward Shelley, Secretary, Church Commissioners.
- Edward Barry Orton Sherlock, General Manager and Actuary, The Equitable Life Assurance Society.
- David Alec Gwyn Simon, Deputy Chairman and Chief Operating Officer, British Petroleum
- William Slinger. For public service in Northern Ireland.
- Graham Alfred Spencer, lately Controller Capital Taxes Office, Board of Inland Revenue.
- Christopher John Tappin, Chairman and Chief Executive, Spirax-Sarco Engineering plc.
- Henry Saxon Tate, Chairman, London Futures and Options Exchange.
- John Frederick Taylor, Departmental Medical Adviser, Department of Transport.
- Professor Antony Charles Thomas, Member, Royal Commission on the Historical Monuments of England.
- Cedric Marshall Thomas, OBE, Commissioner, Health and Safety Executive.
- Peter Kynaston Thomas, Professor of Neurology, Royal Free Hospital, School of Medicine and the Institute of Neurology National Hospital for Neurology and Neurosurgery, London.
- Kathleen Mary Tillotson, OBE, Emeritus Professor of English, University of London, Bedford College.
- Ian Eric Turl, Grade 5, Department of Employment.
- Jeffrey Alan Turnbull, Chairman, Mott MacDonald, Group Ltd.
- Miles Rawstron Walker, Chief Minister, Isle of Man Government.
- David George Stuart Waterstone, lately Chief Executive, Welsh Development Agency.
- James Roy Watson QFSM., Chief Officer, Lancashire Fire Brigade.
- John Carrick Stroud Weeks, lately Head Teacher, Gordano School, Portishead, Avon.
- Albert Wheeler, Regional Director, Midlands and South, British Coal Corporation.
- Graham Winfield, lately Chief Executive, Overseas Division, BOC Group plc; lately Member, Economic and Social Research Council, and Chairman, Post Graduate Training Board.
- Patricia Mary Campbell Winterton, Grade 5, Department of Health.
- Ronald Leslie Woodworth, Commercial Director, Davy Corporation plc. For services to Export.

==== Officers (OBE) ====
Military Division

Royal Navy

- Commander David Austin Blythe, MBE
- Acting Captain Christopher David Seymour Brown.
- Commander Hilary Laskey Foxworthy.
- Commander Michael Patrick Glancy.
- Commander Richard Higgins
- Commander Julian Giles Malec.
- Commander Timothy Pentreath McClement.
- Commander Michael John Norman, AFC
- Major Trevor Acton Philpott, Royal Marines.
- Commander William George Samways.
- Commander Patrick John Tyrrell.
- Commander Thomas Steven Wittich.

Army

- Lieutenant-Colonel Jeremy Whincup Robert Blott, 5th Royal Inniskilling Dragoon Guards.
- Acting-Colonel Eric Tatton Boddye, MBE, TD, Army Cadet Force, Territorial Army.
- Lieutenant-Colonel Michael Henry Hastings Brooke, Corps of Royal Engineers.
- Lieutenant-Colonel John William Chuter, Corps of Royal Electrical and Mechanical Engineers.
- Lieutenant-Colonel Richard Noel Robert Cross, The Royal Highland Fusiliers, (Princess Margaret's Own Glasgow and Ayrshire Regiment).
- Lieutenant-Colonel Paul Anthony Dennis Evans, MBE, Royal Corps of Transport.
- Lieutenant-Colonel Robert James Evans, Royal Corps of Signals.
- Lieutenant-Colonel Anthony Peter Grant-Peterkin, Queen's Own Highlanders, (Seaforth and Camerons).
- Lieutenant-Colonel Roger Michael Greenhouse, MBE, The Royal Regiment of Fusiliers.
- Lieutenant-Colonel (now Colonel) John Scott Houchin, MBE, The Royal Anglian Regiment.
- Lieutenant-Colonel Nicholas Hugh Kelsey, TD, The Royal Anglian Regiment, Territorial Army.
- Lieutenant-Colonel Peter James Knox, The Royal Welch Fusiliers.
- Lieutenant-Colonel Lennox Norman Angus MacEwan, Royal Army Ordnance Corps.
- Lieutenant-Colonel Anthony Charles McClure Mather, MBE, Grenadier Guards.
- Lieutenant-Colonel John Charles Beddoes Morgan, Corps of Royal Electrical and Mechanical Engineers.
- Lieutenant-Colonel Thomas Edward O'Donnell, Royal Army Pay Corps.
- Acting-Colonel Lewis John Rose, DL, Army Cadet Force, Territorial Army.
- Lieutenant-Colonel Ronald Jackson Tilston, Corps of Royal Military Police.
- Lieutenant-Colonel A. Gavin Shorto, The Bermuda Regiment.

Royal Air Force

- Wing Commander Dennis Michael Baker.
- Wing Commander Anthony William Billinghurst, RAF Volunteer Reserve (Training).
- Wing Commander Andrew John Burton, MBE
- Wing Commander Ian Dewhurst.
- Wing Commander Richard Allan Forsythe.
- Wing Commander Peter Willmott Giles.
- Wing Commander Raymond James Horwood.
- Wing Commander Raymond Leonard Lomas (Ret'd).
- Wing Commander William Anthony Brereton Roberts.
- Wing Commander David Michael Shannon.
- Wing Commander Peter William Stannard,
- Wing Commander Peter John Storey.
- Wing Commander William John Taylor.

Civil Division

- Roy Kenneth Ackerman, Chairman, Hotel and Catering Training Board.
- John Kenneth Adams, lately Grade 7, Department of Transport.
- Roy Thomas Adams, Deputy Chief Probation Officer, Merseyside.
- Douglas Herbert Allam. For political service.
- William Joseph Allen, Deputy Chief Nursing Officer, Department of Health and Social Services, Northern Ireland.
- William Keith Arnold, Chairman and Managing Director, Assembly and Automation Electronics Group, Treforest, Mid-Glamorgan.
- Peter Edgar Arscott. For services to the Engineering Employers' Federation.
- Bernard Peter Atha. For services to Sport, particularly Sport for the Disabled.
- Frederick Harper Atkinson, lately Manager, Offshore Division, Lloyd's Register.
- Harold Eric Avery, Principal, Tile Hill College of Further Education, Coventry.
- Joyce Elizabeth Leslie Baird, lately Joint General Secretary, Assistant Masters and Mistresses Association.
- John William Bamford, lately Chairman of the Council, Order of St. John, London.
- Joseph Robert Banks, Senior Principal Research Officer, Foreign and Commonwealth Office.
- Professor Bryan Conway Barrass, Senior Principal Scientific Officer, Ministry of Defence.
- Norman Noel Ingersent Batten, Director of Supplies and Services, Metropolitan Police.
- Thomas Notman Alexander Begg, Board Member, Scottish Homes.
- Maire Patricia Bellew, General Medical Practitioner, Bamber Bridge, Preston, Lancashire.
- Allan Benjamin, Co-ordinator Governor Training, West Glamorgan.
- George Keith Benson, Vice-President, The National Autistic Society.
- Christopher John Bentley, Senior Principal, Ministry of Defence.
- Edward Geoffrey Watson Bill, Librarian and Archivist, Lambeth Palace.
- Robert James Birrell, Inspector of Taxes (SP), Board of Inland Revenue.
- Thomas Babington Boulton TD, E.R.D., Consultant Anaesthetist and Clinical Lecturer, Nuffield Department of Anaesthetics, Oxford and Royal Berkshire Hospital, Reading, Past President, Association of Anaesthetists of Great Britain and Ireland.
- Arthur Bevan Midgley Braithwaite, Chief Executive, The Welding Institute.
- Randal Anthony Maddock Brew. For political and public service.
- Brian Aubrey Brown, Grade 5, The British Library, Property Services Agency.
- Kenneth Alfred Buckley. For services to agriculture and land drainage.
- John Hedley Burrows. For services to Music.
- Simon Peter Quentin Byworth, Director of Engineering, Military Engines, Rolls-Royce plc.
- Duncan Inglis Cameron, lately Director of Administration and Secretary, Heriot-Watt University, Edinburgh.
- Harry Leonard Carpenter, Sports Commentator, British Broadcasting Corporation.
- Major Murray Alexander Carson. For political service.
- Alan Dennis Chapman. For political service.
- The Reverend Michael Wilford Clark. For services to the community in Derbyshire.
- Alexander Collerton, Senior Partner, Napper Collerton Partnership.
- David William Alexander Collett, Director, WaterAid.
- Brian Cecil Cook, Chief Milk and Products Officer, Intervention Board.
- Joan Bostock Cox, Chairman, Merseyside Branch; Member, Council North-West Region, Soldiers', Sailors' and Airmen's Families Association.
- Eric John Crozier. For services to Music.
- Catherine Holway Cruft, Curator Grade 6, National Monuments Record of Scotland.
- Charles William Cunnington, lately Chairman, South East Derbyshire Advisory Sub-Committee on Justices of the Peace.
- Nicol Buchanan Currie, Headteacher, Garthamlock Secondary School, Glasgow.
- James Raymond Cutler, Senior Principal Scientific Officer, Scottish Office.
- Michael Davies, Chairman, Thames Regional Flood Defence Committee, National Rivers Authority.
- Peter Denniss, Senior Principal Scientific Officer, Ministry of Defence.
- Joseph Dickinson. For services to Agriculture.
- Sheila Marion Dobie, Head Movement Studies Department, Moray House College of Education, Edinburgh.
- David Kester-Dodgson, lately Design Director, Christie-Tyler plc.
- Hugh Dodgson, Grade 7, Ministry of Defence.
- David Donovan. For services to Karate.
- Derek James Dormer, National President, Working Men's Club and Institute Union.
- Diana Dowdeswell, Chairman and Managing Director, Dowdeswell Engineering Company Ltd.
- Walter Eric Duckworth, lately Managing Director, Fulmer Ltd.
- Patricia Duff, Director, Quality Assurance and Human Resources; District Nursing Adviser, Basingstoke and North Hampshire Health Authority.
- Helen Audrey Dunlop, President, Somerset Branch, British Red Cross Society.
- Ronald Charles Dunn, Regional Managing Director, John Laing Construction, Northern Ireland.
- George Dyce, Chairman, Committee of the Aberdeen and North East Scotland Wing, Air Training Corps.
- Professor Anthony Roy Emerson, Chairman, Norfolk Family Practitioner Committee.
- Bersey Ian Evans, lately Vice-Chairman, UK Pilots' Association (Marine); Member, Pilotage Commission.
- Nancy Evans. For services to Music.
- John Reginald Farthing, lately Management Development Co-ordinator, Dorset Education Authority.
- Barry Flanagan, Sculptor.
- Robert Walter Fordham. For services to Industry in the West Midlands.
- John Frederick Foster. For services to road safety education.
- Elizabeth Mary Gallagher, MBE. For services to disabled people and travelling people in Northern Ireland.
- Peter Harold Gilbert, Chief Officer, Royal Parks Constabulary, Department of the Environment.
- John Goddard, Grade 7, Department of Social Security.
- Jack Philip Goldstone. For charitable services in Northern Ireland.
- Graham Alan Gooch, For services to Cricket.
- Michael Arthur John Gossip, Chief Executive, Argyll and Bute District Council.
- Elizabeth Ann Gray, Deputy Head Teacher and former Head of English Department, Wakefield Girls' High School.
- George Bovill Rennie Gray, DL. For services to Agriculture in East Lothian.
- Egerton Gerard Hope Green, Head of Air Traffic Services Standards, Civil Aviation Authority.
- Myra Green, Overseas Director, Voluntary Service Overseas.
- Tom Greenwood, Senior Fire Prevention Inspector, HM Fire Service Inspectorate.
- Scott Grier, Managing Director, Loganair, Ltd.
- Eugenie Cynthia Hampton, DL. For services to the community and the Probation Service, Hampshire.
- James Allitt Hancock. For services to Ornithology.
- John Hardwick. For political service.
- Ronald Dobson Harkness, Secretary, The Scottish Agricultural College.
- John Henry Harland, Deputy Chief Constable, Avon and Somerset Constabulary.
- Anthony John Harrison, MBE, Chief Scientific Adviser, Avon County Council; Public Analyst and Official Agricultural Analyst, Avon and Gloucestershire County Council.
- Sandra June Harrison, Headteacher, Mossbrook School, Sheffield.
- Miss Evelyn Hastings, Chief Area Nursing Officer, Lanarkshire Health Board.
- Brenda Hatton, lately Principal, City and East London College.
- Christopher William Dupen Holt, Vice-President, Victim Support.
- Richard Threlfall Hurst, Chairman, Richard Threlfall Ltd. For services to the community in Bolton.
- Robert Francis Jackson, Director, Forward Strategy and Planning, British Aerospace (Dynamics) Ltd.
- Thomas Gordon Jackson, Political Editor, Thomson Regional Newspapers.
- Donald James Jeffrey. For services to the Leicester Engineering Training Group Ltd.
- Michael Nicholas Howard Jenkins, Chief Executive, London International Financial Futures Exchange.
- Joan Johnson. For political and public service.
- Elizabeth Jane Lloyd-Jones, Principal Architect, Department of Education and Science.
- Evan Michael Jones. For political and public service.
- Jacqueline Maud Wynne-Jones, Area Organiser, South and West Yorkshire Metropolitan Area, Women's Royal Voluntary Service.
- Alfred Nevill Joseph, Governor, HM Prison Liverpool.
- Michael Kaye. For services to Music.
- Alan Keith, Broadcaster, British Broadcasting Corporation.
- Robert Deans Kernohan, lately Editor, Life and Work.
- Peter Kiddle, Sales and Marketing Director, Philips Telecom.
- Nora Elizabeth King, Vice-President, Scottish Council, Save The Children Fund.
- Cecilia Madeliena Knowles, Principal, Board of Inland Revenue.
- Margaret Rita Kyrle. For political and public service.
- Meriel Denison Laverack, lately National Heritage Adviser, The Countryside Commission.
- John Leggate, Biochemist, Department of Biochemistry, Stobhill Hospital, Glasgow.
- Richard Stuart Lines, Chairman and Chief Executive, MTM plc.
- George Howard Longden, lately Chief Executive and Borough Treasurer, Hove Borough Council.
- Peter Herent Lord, Consultant Surgeon, Wycombe General Hospital, High Wycombe.
- Ewen McKinnon Low. For services to the Home Grown Cereals Authority.
- William Lowther, Managing Director, UCB Sidac Ltd.
- Sister Joan Kathleen Lynam, lately Principal, Rathmore Grammar School, Belfast.
- William Ewan Maclean, Principal Medical Officer, Remploy Ltd.
- Alexander Mitchell MacPherson, lately Headmaster, Lord Mayor Treloar College, Hampshire.
- Nigel Ernest James Mansell. For services to Motor Racing.
- Peter David Marshall, Principal Scientific Officer, Ministry of Defence.
- Peter Holland Martin, lately Courts Administrator, Lord Chancellor's Department.
- Alasdair Burnett Matheson, Consultant, Accident and Emergency Department, Aberdeen Royal Infirmary.
- The Right Honourable William Basil McIvor, Chairman, Board of Governors, Lagan College.
- Patrick Arthur McKeown, Chairman and Chief Executive, Cranfield Precision Engineering Ltd; Professor of Precision Engineering, Cranfield Institute of Technology.
- Robert McKinney, Principal, Ayr College.
- Rosemary Mellor. For political and public service.
- Christopher Stewart Metcalf, Chairman, The Chaseley Trust.
- Ivor Neil Morgan, Headteacher, Horndean School, Portsmouth.
- Herbert Edward Harnett Murphy, Public Affairs Director, Scotland Automobile Association.
- Elsie Emily Nash, Chairman, Women's Section, The Royal British Legion.
- Heather Mary Nightingale, Chief Nursing Officer, Canterbury and Thanet Health Authority.
- David Baird Nisbet, Deputy Managing Director, GEC Ferranti Defence Systems Ltd.
- Tom Timothy Norreys, MBE, Managing Director, Avon Inflatables, Ltd, Llanelli, Dyfed.
- Squadron Leader Harold Walter Oliver (Ret'd). For political and public service.
- Eric Ollerenshaw. For political and public service.
- Ann Doric Orme, Chairman, Board of Visitors, HM Prison Erlestoke.
- Mohan Sankar John Pathy, Professor of Geriatric Medicine, University of Wales College of Medicine.
- Captain Michael John Perry, lately Marine Manager and Deputy Superintendent, Research Vessel Services, Natural Environment Research Council.
- William Petrie, DL, Provost, Dumbarton District Council.
- Gordon Charles Pettitt, Director, Regional Railways, British Railways Board.
- Neville Phillips. For political and public service.
- John Richard Plant, Chief Executive, Royal Brompton National Heart and Lung Hospitals.
- Ronald John Presley, President, Lawn Tennis Association.
- William John Reaprice, lately Director, Social Services, Islington.
- George Priestley, Managing Director, Old Mill Marketing Ltd.
- Jane Priestman, Director of Architecture and Design, British Railways Board.
- Reginald Henry Pyne, Assistant Registrar, Standards and Ethics, United Kingdom Central Council for Nursing, Midwifery and Health Visiting.
- Anthony Charles George Raggett, Technical Director, Marine and Aviation, RFD Ltd.
- James Maynard Rainbow, Managing Director, Monarch Aircraft Engineering Ltd.
- Richard Walsh Rallison, Deputy Managing Director, Ratcliff Tail Lifts Ltd.
- Esther Rantzen, Producer and Presenter, British Broadcasting Corporation; Chairman of ChildLine.
- Donald Gordon Rennie. For political service.
- Dudley Raymond Richards DL For services to the community and the Llangollen International Eisteddfod.
- Charles Michael Dennison Roberts, Appeals Director, St, Gemma's Hospice, Leeds.
- Patrick Dugan Robertson, Chairman, Highland Region, Children's Panel Advisory Committee.
- Frank Elms Robson, Registrar, Diocese of Oxford; Provincial Registrar, Province of Canterbury.
- William Henry Robson. For services to Agriculture.
- Graham Tullis Ross, LVO, lately Director, Scottish Business in the Community.
- Helmut Rothenberg. For charitable services.
- Herbert Morrison Runciman, Top Grade Consultant, Barr and Stroud Ltd.
- Joy Elizabeth Rose Ryley. For political and public service.
- Bhagwan Khushaldas Samtani, Consultant Physician and Unit General Manager, Kettering District Health Authority.
- Daniel Sharpe, Grade 6, Department of Trade and Industry.
- Roy Edwin Shaw. For services to Local Government External Audit.
- Peter Leslie Shilton, MBE. For services to Association Football.
- Peter Douglas Stark, Director, Northern Arts.
- Robert Noel David Stephenson, Managing Director, Newcastle Breweries Ltd.
- Arthur John Crispin Stevenson, Headmaster, St Marylebone School, Westminster.
- Nancy Stewart. For political service.
- John Walbridge Sumsion, Registrar of Public Lending Right.
- John Tait, Principal Nursing Officer, Department of Health.
- John William Ransom Taylor, Editor Emeritus Jane's All the World's Aircraft.
- Major Anthony Leslie Thres, lately Regional Secretary, Devon Branch, Country Landowners' Association.
- Lorna Margaret Timms, Principal Scientific Officer, Central Veterinary Laboratory.
- James Sadler Treasure, lately Technical Director, Sadlers (Lytham) Ltd.
- David Trowbridge. For political service.
- Antony Neville Twine, Chairman, GRI Group plc, Perth.
- John Reginald Tylar, Head of Technical Audit, Aeroengine and Technology Division, Ruston Gas Turbines Ltd.
- Albert Bryan Upton, Chairman, Richardson Sheffield, Ltd. For services to Export.
- Charles John Uridge, Counselling Adviser, Small Firms Service.
- John Richard Uttley, Group Director, Finance and Administration, National Grid Company.
- Eric Arthur Vallis, Member, Estates Committee, Canterbury Cathedral; Fellow and Estates Bursar, Oriel College, Oxford.
- Angela Mary Vivian, Inspector of Taxes (SP), Board of Inland Revenue.
- Ian Nicoll Walden. For services to Urban Regeneration.
- Professor David Walker, lately Chairman, Agricultural Wages' Board.
- Raymond James Walker, Chief Executive, The Simpler Trade Procedures Board. For services to Export.
- James Rennie Watt, Director, March Consulting Group.
- Sidney Shalom Wayne, Chairman, Waltham Forest Health Authority.
- Clement Trevor Wheatley, Chairman, Control Techniques plc, Newtown, Powys.
- Rosemary Heather White, Member, Interim Advisory Committee on School Teachers' Pay and Conditions.
- Winston Timothy White. For services to the Luton and South Bedfordshire Hospice.
- Christine Margaret Elizabeth Whitehead. For services to Housing.
- Frederick John Wells Whiting, Leader, Independent Group Association of County Councils.
- Arthur Ronald Williams, Chief Executive, Timber Growers United Kingdom.
- Oliver Darien Willmore, Member, Building Regulations Advisory Committee.
- Ian Edmund Wooldridge, Sports Columnist, Daily Mail.
- Norman Arthur Wragg, Principal Scientific Officer, Health and Safety Executive.
- John Keith Wright, Director, Health and Safety, Nuclear Electric plc.
- Lieutenant-Commander John Walter Lloyd Zehetmayr, VRD, RNR (Retd.) For services to Forestry and Conservation.

==== Members (MBE) ====
Military Division

Royal Navy

- Warrant Officer 2 (Bandmaster) Trevor John Attwood, Royal Marines.
- Warrant Officer Edward Cameron Clamp.
- Lieutenant-Commander James Andrew Davies RD, Royal Naval Reserve.
- Lieutenant-Commander John Alexander Downie.
- Lieutenant-Commander Gavin John Richard Eyre.
- Lieutenant-Commander Nicholas Acklom Franks.
- Lieutenant-Commander Philip Faulder Hasler Helby.
- Warrant Officer David Howard Jones.
- Lieutenant-Commander (SCC) Frank Arthur Pettifer, Royal Naval Reserve.
- Lieutenant-Commander Derek Edward Rowland.
- Lieutenant (now Lieutenant-Commander) Christopher John Straughan.
- Lieutenant-Commander Henry Francis Farnall Thurstan.
- Lieutenant-Commander Lyndsay Donald Walton-Waters.
- Lieutenant-Commander David Ernest Western.
- Warrant Officer John Trevor Willmitt.
- Lieutenant-Commander Gordon Barry John Wilson.

Army

- Major Nigel Athelstan Afford, Royal Regiment of Artillery.
- Warrant Officer Class 2 Christopher Leslie Aston, Corps of Royal Engineers.
- Major Balkrishna Rana, Gurkha Transport Regiment.
- Warrant Officer Class 1 Norman Beavis, Royal Army Ordnance Corps.
- Major John Alfred Blackmore, TD, Royal Regiment of Artillery, Territorial Army.
- Warrant Officer Class 1 Alan David Bradshaw, Corps of Royal Military Police.
- Major Jonathan Michael Bray, The Royal Highland Fusiliers (Princess Margaret's Own Glasgow and Ayrshire Regiment).
- Captain Douglas Graham Bridges, The Staffordshire Regiment, (The Prince of Wales's), Territorial Army.
- Major Andrew Thomas Bruce, Royal Regiment of Artillery.
- Captain Terence Christopher Byrne, Royal Corps of Transport.
- Warrant Officer Class 1 (now Lieutenant) Michael John Roberts Cotton, Royal Army Pay Corps.
- Major Dalman Golay, 7th Duke of Edinburgh's Own Gurkha Rifles.
- Major James Stewart Douglas, The Royal Irish Rangers, (27th (Inniskilling) 83rd and 87th).
- Major David Waring Eustace, The Light Infantry.
- Warrant Officer Class 1 Philip John Everitt, Royal Regiment of Artillery.
- Captain John Alexander Farr, The Parachute Regiment.
- Major David Gordon Fisher, Royal Corps of Transport.
- Major Geoffrey Arthur Fryatt, Royal Regiment of Artillery.
- Warrant Officer Class 1 William Gibson, Royal Corps of Transport, Territorial Army.
- Major Robert Barry Hobson, Royal Corps of Transport.
- Major Roderick Alexander Ingleby-Mackenzie, Scots Guards.
- Acting Major Barry Dennis Jeffries, Army Cadet Force, Territorial Army.
- Major Edward Cyril Kimberley, The Royal Hampshire Regiment.
- Captain Robert William Lockwood, Royal Corps of Signals.
- The Reverend Terence John Makings, Chaplain to the Forces 3rd Class, Royal Army Chaplains' Department.
- Major Raymond McCall, Royal Army Pay Corps.
- Warrant Officer Class 1 Malbon Arthur Peaple, Army Air Corps.
- Warrant Officer Class 2 Ellis Graham Pittaway, Royal Army Ordnance Corps.
- Captain Alan William Richards, MM, The Parachute Regiment.
- Major John Hughes Richardson, Royal Corps of Signals.
- Warrant Officer Class 1 Harold Scott, The King's Own Royal Border Regiment.
- Captain Roy Ian Shipton, Corps of Royal Electrical and Mechanical Engineers.
- Major Nicholas Anthony Shryane, 13th/18th Royal Hussars, (Queen Mary's Own).
- Warrant Officer Class 1 David Anthony Simpson, Royal Regiment of Artillery.
- Major (now Lieutenant-Colonel) Kenneth Simpson, TD, General List, Territorial Army.
- Captain Peter Gordon William Smith, Royal Regiment of Artillery, Territorial Army.
- Major Derek Alan Craig Smyth, TD, Royal Army Pay Corps, Territorial Army
- Warrant Officer Class 2 (now Lieutenant) Robin Thornton, The Queen's Regiment, Territorial Army.
- Major Godfrey Harold Robert Tilney, 14th/20th King's Hussars.
- Major Ian Alexander Vere-Nicholl, Royal Regiment of Artillery.
- Warrant Officer Class 1 Roy Gordon Whitford, Royal Army Ordnance Corps.
- Major Christopher William Wilks, The Royal Regiment of Wales (24th/41st Foot).
- Captain Richard John Williams, The Royal Regiment of Wales (24th/41st Foot), Territorial Army.
- Major Allan George Wise, TD, Royal Army Ordnance Corps, Territorial Army.

Royal Air Force

- Warrant Officer Samuel Colin Allen.
- Flight Lieutenant John David Anderson.
- Warrant Officer James Armstrong.
- Flight Lieutenant Roy William Arnold, RAFVR(T).
- Flight Lieutenant Mervyn Humphrey Astle.
- Warrant Officer Hugh William Barnfather.
- Warrant Officer Eileen Joan Beasley, BEM, Women's Royal Air Force.
- Warrant Officer David Desmond Brailey.
- Flight Lieutenant Frederick George Chapman, RAFVR(T).
- Squadron Leader Roger Victor Davis.
- Master Aircrew Geoffrey Edwards.
- Warrant Officer Maxine Jeanette Gore, WRAF.
- Squadron Leader Michael Keith Green, (Ret'd).
- Squadron Leader Robert William Grundy.
- Squadron Leader Eric Clive Harrison.
- Squadron Leader Timothy John Kerss.
- Squadron Leader Nicholas Julian Eugene Kurth.
- Master Aircrew Michael Muttitt.
- Squadron Leader Edward Finbar O'Toole.
- Flight Lieutenant Ian McCulloch Pride.
- Squadron Leader Frank Frederick Pullen.
- Warrant Officer Eric Robertson.
- Squadron Leader Michael George Salter.
- Flight Lieutenant Alfred James Shears.
- Squadron Leader James Philip Stenson.
- Flight Lieutenant Graham Edward Thomas.
- Warrant Officer John Willows.

Civil Division

- William Desmond Aisthorpe. For political service.
- Alexander Bayliss Alexander, Auxiliary Lieutenant, Staff Port Naval Auxiliary Officer, Royal Naval Auxiliary Service, Clyde.
- John Fleming Allan, Chief Administrative Dental Officer, Shetland.
- Arthur Ernest Anderson, Divisional Director, Conveyor Belting Division, J.H. Fenner and Co. Ltd.
- John Graham Anderson, lately Constabulary Superintendent, United Kingdom Atomic Energy Authority.
- William John Baird, Northern Ireland Chairman, Institute of Fisheries Management.
- Jean Baker, Headteacher, Alderman Smith County Infant School, Bury, Lancashire.
- Margaret Baker. For services to the community in Saughall, Chester.
- Captain Lancelot Ball, Captain of the Mobil Lubchem.
- Maureen Joan Bane, Nursing Officer (Hospital Manager), South East Kent Health Authority.
- Hazel Margaret Barbour, Community Affairs Advisor, Shell UK.
- Douglas Godfrey Barrett, TD, Deputy Chairman, Domestic Coal Consumers' Council.
- The Reverend Canon John Barton, lately Chaplain, Oxford Hospitals.
- John Carmichael Beard, County Librarian, Hampshire.
- Bill Bellerby. For services to the community in Guildford, Surrey.
- Doreen Bellerby. For services to the community in Guildford, Surrey.
- Constance Mary Bent. For services to the community in Rochdale.
- George Alan Berry. For services to Journalism.
- Doris Rose Besant, Chairman, Covent Garden Estate and Kensington and Chelsea Residents' Association.
- Clive Henry Best, Technical Manager (Iron), Davy McKee (Stockton) Ltd.
- Iris Beynon, Officer-in-Charge, Caemaen Residential Home for the Elderly, Llanelli, Dyfed.
- Juliet Martin Bingley. For services to St Mark's Hospital, City and Hackney Health Authority.
- John Samuel Binks. For political and public service.
- David Bloom, Senior Executive Officer, HM Board of Customs and Excise.
- Walter Harold Blore, Group Controller, Lincoln Group, United Kingdom Warning and Monitoring Organisation.
- John Bond, Marketing Executive, British Federal Ltd. For services to Export.
- Anne Eileen Bone, Co-ordinator, Grampian Sudden Bereavement Helpline Service.
- Myriam Margaret Lucia Booth, Senior Clerk, British Antarctic Survey, Stanley Office, Falkland Islands, Natural Environment Research Council.
- Beryl Bradford, lately Officer-in-Charge, Burton's Orchard Social Services Department, Somerset.
- Joan Egerton Bouverie-Brine. For political and public service.
- Eric Harrison Broadley, Chairman, Lola Cars Ltd. For services to Export.
- Allin Brookfield, Controller, Philips Radio Communications Systems Ltd.
- Martin Christopher Broom, Chairman and Managing Director, Broom Boats Ltd.; lately Chairman National Boat Shows Ltd.
- Christopher Bratton Brown. For political and public service.
- Carl Albert Burton, Senior Site Representative, APEX.
- Iris Bozier Butcher. For services to the community in Reading, Berkshire.
- John Derek Byrne, Manager, Employee Relations, Fina plc.
- Pearl Langsdale Cain, President, County Committee, Royal British Legion Women's Section, Isle of Man.
- Susan Catherine Campbell, Director, National Coaching Foundation.
- Desmond John Edward Carter, lately Commander, Roxeth, and Harrow Company, Church Lads' and Church Girls' Brigade.
- Lieutenant-Colonel Ronald Cartwright (Ret'd) TD, Member, Limavady, Borough Council.
- Nora Elizabeth Casey. For services to the community in Lisnaskea.
- John Cawley, Higher Executive Officer, Ministry of Defence.
- Margaret Ruth Chadd. For services to the community in Suffolk.
- Michael Chew Koon Chan, Chairman, Chinese Overseas Christian Mission.
- Leonard Kingsley Gordon Chick, Higher Executive Officer, Crown Prosecution Service.
- William John Chignell, Chairman, Solihull Branch, The Royal Air Force Association.
- Freda Child, Higher Executive Officer, Training Agency, Department of Employment.
- Wilfrid John Chippendale, Senior Executive Officer, Ministry of Defence.
- John William Clark, lately Divisional General Manager and Deputy Director Nursing, Mental Handicap Services Unit, Southampton, and South West Hampshire Health Authority.
- Margaret Hepburn Clark, Cancer Registration Officer, Grampian Health Board.
- Donald Ralph Clarke, Honorary Secretary and Founder, Mildenhall Register, (15-149-622 Bomber Squadrons RAF).
- George Coates, Deputy Area Commissioner, East Devon, St. John Ambulance Brigade.
- Marjory Cockburn. For services to St. Luke's Hospice, Sheffield.
- Elspeth Alison Lydford Cole, lately Council Member, World Wide Fund for Nature, UK.
- Ronald Cook, Assistant Divisional Officer, East Sussex Fire Brigade.
- Robert Cottam, Trainer and Organiser for Youth Training.
- George Courtney, For services to Association Football.
- Alan John Coxon, Chief Superintendent, Metropolitan Police.
- Philip Lee Craven. For services to Sport for the Disabled.
- David Cripps, Photographer.
- John Edward Crisp, Assistant Housing Officer, Rheindahlen Garrison, West Germany.
- Robert Cuckney, Senior Administrative Officer (Grade 7), London Fire Brigade.
- Peter George Cull, Director, Education and Medical Illustration Services, St Bartholomew's Hospital, Medical College, University of London.
- Bronwen Cullinane, lately Domestic Services Manager, National Health Service.
- Gerald Frank Curtis, lately Clerk to the Lord Chief Justice, Lord Chancellor's Department.
- Margaret Ann Dale, Director of Nursing, London Chest Hospital.
- Trevor Bryan Davey, Chief Superintendent, West Yorkshire Police.
- Frena Elizabeth Macintyre Davidson. For political and public service.
- John Davies. For services to the Disabled in Wales.
- Ada Bell Dixon, Higher Executive Officer, Department of Health.
- Alan Dixon, Engineering Manager (West), North West Water Ltd.
- Patricia Dixon. For services to the Royal Marines' School of Music.
- Joan Pamela Dobby, Senior Programmer, University of Kent, Canterbury.
- William Donaldson, Superintendent, Royal Ulster Constabulary.
- Joseph William Edward Douglas, Higher Executive Officer, Paymaster General's Office.
- Sadie Naomi Douglas, Administrative Director, Scottish Civic Trust.
- Robert Patrick Duffy, Representative, International Affairs, Road Haulage Association.
- Paul William James Dunsby, Chairman, Vale Plums.
- Pauline Mary Edwards. For services to Archery.
- Alexander Pirie Elrick, Choirmaster, Kevock Choir, Midlothian.
- Hugh Alexander Evans, General Medical Practitioner, Great Yarmouth, Norfolk.
- Peter John Francis Faithfull, Project Manager, Ground Systems, Marconi Space Systems Ltd.
- Jean Margaret Faulkner, Senior Personal Secretary to the Chief Executive, Horticultural Research International.
- Alban Thomas Fay, Advisory Head Teacher, Deputy Chief Education Officer, Manchester.
- Alexander Wilson Ferrier, Assistant Principal, Inverness College of Further and Higher Education.
- Gordon Sydney Flory, Lay Member, Hampshire Family Practitioners' Committee.
- David Forder, lately Administrative Director, Colchester Mercury Theatre.
- Elma Forteath, Executive Officer, Department of Social Security.
- Albert Lewis Fowler, Education Liaison Manager, Hughes Microelectronics Ltd., Glenrothes.
- William Henry John Frost. For political service.
- Isaac Gabay, Executive Chef, Refreshment Department, House of Commons.
- Teresa Mignon Gaisman. For political service.
- William Malcolm Galbraith. For services to the community in Liverpool.
- David Gale. For services to Ballet.
- David Ronald Gibbard, lately Tariffs and Contracts Manager, Eastern Electricity plc.
- Frederick Henry Gibbons, Senior Probation Officer, South East London.
- Kenneth Sidney Goddard, General Manager, Market Finance, Corporation of Lloyd's.
- Mary Frances Gough, Managing Director, The Bury St. Edmunds Hotel Company.
- George Paul Graham. For political service.
- Christopher Graves, Secretary, Galloway Cattle Society of Great Britain and Ireland.
- Geoffrey Greed, Lecturer, Bishop Grosseteste College, Lincoln.
- Trevor Green, lately Head, Department of Science, Senior Pro-Director, Bristol Polytechnic.
- Annette Frances Mary Griffith, Vice-President, Carmarthen Dyfed Branch, British Red Cross Society.
- David Ernest John Guy, Managing Director, Packhouse Properties.
- Frederick Brian Haffern, Programme Co-ordinator, Northern Ireland Small Business Institute.
- Helen Neva MacDonald-Haig. For services to Scottish Riding for the Disabled Association.
- Leslie James Hall, Technical Director, Dairy Trade Federation.
- Charles Halliday. For political and public service.
- John Stuart Hambridge, Director, Sheffield Chamber of Commerce.
- Francis Hand, Programmes Manager, Defence Fabrications Division, Lucas Aerospace, UK.
- Derek Davison Hardy, Local Officer II, Department of Social Security.
- Basil Vernon Harfield, Senior Executive Officer, Ministry of Defence.
- Ronald Harrison, Business Editor, The Journal, Newcastle upon Tyne.
- Peter Hawkey, Warden/Naturalist, The National Trust, Farne Islands.
- The Reverend Thomas Russell Hawthorn. For services to the community in Lowestoft.
- Jean Henderson, Metropolitan Organiser, Sheffield Branch, Women's Royal Voluntary Service.
- Mary May Hewitt, Executive Officer, Department of Social Security.
- Edward Gerald Higson. For public service in Bolton.
- Barbara Iolen Hill, lately Vice-Chairman, Wolverhampton Health Authority.
- Peter Charles Hoare, Director, the National Inspection Council for Electrical Installation Contracting.
- Roy Hodgkinson, lately Senior Professional and Technology Officer, Home Office.
- Edward Michael Hollingsworth, Chairman, Hyde Housing Association.
- Alfred Basil Howell, Management Consultant, Jobs Club.
- Hugh Calderwood Hunter, Assistant Firemaster, Strathclyde Fire Brigade.
- John Douglas Ingham. For services to BLESMA.
- Albert Ronald Isherwood, Workshop Manager, Development Department, Birmingham City Metropolitan Council.
- James Stanley Jackson. For services to the Pottery Industry.
- Helen Muriel James, Founder Member, St. Giles Club, Newton Stewart.
- Sheila James, Head Teacher, St. Agnes Primary School, Manchester.
- Lewis Johnston Murray Jamieson, lately Deputy Branch Medical Officer, Northumbria Branch, British Red Cross Society.
- Margaret Johnston. For services to Bowls.
- Bruce Edward Fayrer-Jones. For services to the Coal Industry.
- Thomas John Leslie Jones. For services to Athletics.
- Joan Kempe. For political and public service.
- Alan John Kendall, Divisional Director, Barnardo's, North West Division.
- John Martin Kennair, Chief Executive, Romag Holdings plc.
- Leighton James Kent, District Controller, Maritime Rescue Co-ordinating Centre, Swansea, HM Coastguard.
- Michael Wallace Kenyon, BEM, lately Senior Executive Officer, Department of Trade and Industry.
- Gerry Kinsella, Scheme Manager, Greenbank Project.
- Sheila Margaret Coleby Klopper, Founder, Ready Call General Good Neighbour Scheme.
- Henry John Bannister Knowles. For services to the community in Melbourne, Derbyshire.
- Peter Herbert Lambert, lately Group Station Manager, Clapham South.
- Margaret Lawford, Secretary, Dancers' Resettlement Fund and Trust.
- William Burgess Lawrenson, Regional Information Officer, Department of Social Security.
- The Reverend Hubert Brian Leathley. For services to The Clapham Junction Rail Disaster Fund.
- Edward Joseph Lee, lately President, Cinema Exhibitors' Association.
- Jessie Mac Farlane Leighton, lately Headmistress, Newlands School, Maidenhead, Berkshire.
- Colin Maurice Leon, Principal in General Practice Gateshead; Associate Adviser in General Practice, University of Newcastle-upon-Tyne.
- Pamela Jean Lessin. For services to the Save the Children Fund.
- Hazel Penelope Lewis, Senior Personal Secretary, Ministry of Defence.
- Terence Victor Lewis, Senior Professional and Technology Officer, Ministry of Defence.
- Vincent James Linklater, Auctioneer, Kirkwall Auction Mart Ltd.
- Margaret Evelyn Littlefield, Assistant Youth Worker, Hillside Youth and Community Centre, Portsmouth, Hampshire.
- Elizabeth Janette Lloyd. For services to the community in Derbyshire.
- Shirley Ann Lockwood, Secretary to Managing Director, FR Aviation Ltd.; Main Board Director, FR Group plc.
- Margaret Rita Lough, Medical Ward Sister, Specialist Diabetes Clinical Nurse, Gateshead, Health Authority.
- Hazel Noreen Love. For political service.
- Marjorie Edna Lyne, President, Teignmouth, League of Friends.
- John Patrick Lyon. For services to Amateur Boxing.
- Mairi MacKinlay. For services to Glasgow Branch, Soldiers' Sailors' and Airmen's Families Association.
- Angus Macrae, President, Scottish Crofters' Union.
- Marion Mallon. For services to the community in Kilmarnock.
- Mary Mann. For political service.
- Victor James Alban Manton. For services to Zoo Management.
- Arthur Harry Martin, lately Field Commissioner, The Scout Association.
- Ramsay Quayle Martin, Marine Equipment Engineer.
- Ronald Alexander Matthews, Chief Superintendent, Royal Ulster Constabulary.
- James Maynard, Senior Executive Officer, Board of Inland Revenue.
- Dennis McCarthy, Broadcaster, Radio Nottingham, British Broadcasting Corporation.
- Samuel McClelland, lately Director of Nursing Services, Muckamore Abbey Hospital, Eastern Health and Social Services Board.
- Iris Ellen McGowran, Member, Post Office Users' Council for Scotland and Scottish Advisory Committee for Telecommunications; Member, Post Office Users' National Council.
- Marion Scott McGregor, Personal Assistant to the Secretary, Chartered Institute of Management Accountants.
- Mary Morgan McIntosh. For services to the community in Walkerburn.
- Ian McLennan McIntyre, Divisional Manager Production, Yarrow Shipbuilders, Ltd.
- William Rolf Semple McMaster, Clerk and Chief Executive, Magherafelt District Council.
- John Michael McMeeking, Chairman, Nottinghamshire Wildlife Trust.
- Mary McMullan. For services to the community in Belfast.
- Geoffrey William Meetham, Chief, Non-Metal and Composite Manufacturing Technology, Rolls-Royce plc.
- John Mitchell, Manager, Health and Safety Department, Vickers Shipbuilding and Engineering Ltd, Barrow-in-Furness.
- Michael John Moore, Member and former Chairman, Manchester Port Health Authority and for services to local government.
- Kenneth Charles Morby. For services to Charity.
- John Frederick Charles Morris, Secretary, Freight Transport Association.
- Donald Alexander Morrison, Chairman, Skye and Lochalsh, Housing Association.
- Gerard Francis Murphy, Bakery Manager, Arthur McCann Ltd, Victoria Bakery, Newry.
- Yvonne Carol Grace Murray. For services to Athletics.
- Eileen Dorothy Murrell, Senior Executive Officer, HM Board of Customs and Excise.
- George Nelson, Senior Engineer Construction Dundee, Scottish Hydro Electric plc.
- Mike Neville, Presenter, Look North, British Broadcasting Corporation.
- Molly Lee Norris. For political and public service.
- Rosaleen O'Hanlon, Staff Officer, Industrial Development Board, for Northern Ireland.
- Ursula Evelyn Lloyd-Owen, County President, Norfolk St. John Ambulance Brigade.
- Gladys Violet Parke. For political service.
- Peter Irwyn Pavey, lately Senior Field Service Engineer, Martin-Baker Aircraft Ltd.
- Esther Jane Pearson, Higher Executive Officer, Department of Social Security.
- John Mervyn Pell, Secretary, Hampshire Playing Fields Association.
- John Hamilton Pendered, General Practitioner, Sussex.
- Dorcas Phelps, Nursing Officer, South East Kent Health Authority.
- Cora Frances Phillips, Vice-President, Alzheimer's Disease Society.
- Gladys Phillipson. For services to the community in Carnforth, Lancashire.
- John Joseph Philpott, Mapping and Charting Officer, Ordnance Survey.
- Evelyn Jessie Pigott, Member, Executive Council, National Grocers' Benevolent Fund.
- Robert Raymond Pittam, Chairman, Home Office Retired Staff Association.
- Joan Irene Plumb, lately Chief Education Officer, Royal College of Veterinary Surgeons.
- Bryan Harold Powell, Chairman, Berkshire War Pensions Committee.
- Pamela Mary Elizabeth Powell. For services to the promotion of tourism in Wales.
- Tessa Gillian Rosamond Preece. For political service.
- Robert Priestley, lately Senior Scientific Officer, Scottish Office.
- Patricia Dorothy Prince, Principal Photographer, Health and Safety Executive.
- The Reverend William Robert Pryce, lately Senior Training Adviser, Training Agency, Department of Employment.
- Dorothy Purcell, Personal Secretary, Territorial, Auxiliary and Volunteer Reserve Association.
- Betty Raitt, lately Nursing Officer, Accident and Emergency Department, Aberdeen Royal Infirmary.
- Mary-Elizabeth Raw, Veterinary Surgeon, Weston-super-Mare, Avon.
- Irene Rayner, Director, Wallasey, Council for Voluntary Service.
- Robert Heslop Reay. For services to the North Sunderland, Lifeboat Station.
- Michael John Reid, Managing Director, John Reid and Sons (Strucsteel) Ltd.
- Leslie Rheinberg, Chairman and Secretary, Silk Association of Great Britain.
- Allan Richmond, Engineering Director, Huwood Ltd.
- Joyce Mary Rimmer, lately Lecturer in Social Work, Birmingham University.
- Jenny Ritchie, Co-ordinator, Family Support Project, Voluntary Service Aberdeen.
- Ronald Anthony George Rivett, Credit and Commercial Manager, Perkins Group Ltd.
- Elizabeth Christina Rogers, Senior Nurse, National Spinal Injuries Centre, Stoke Mandeville Hospital, Aylesbury, Vale Health Authority.
- William James Gerald Rogers. For political and public service.
- Colin Ronald, Director, International Sales, Motherwell Bridge Projects Ltd., Motherwell.
- Frank Roper, Sculptor.
- Alan Harwood Roscoe, lately Company Medical Adviser, Britannia Airways.
- Harold Wilfred Rose. For services to the community in Sunderland.
- Ronald Robertson Rose, Wildlife Manager, Eskdalemuir.
- Shannie Ross, Founder ASPIRE; Charity for rehabilitation for orthopaedic patients.
- Mary Rowland, Nursing Sister, Warrenpoint Health Centre.
- John William Sabourn, Master, MV Silver Pit.
- Katherine Satchell, Head Office Services, City and East London Health Authority.
- Jack Schofield, Senior Lecturer, Liverpool Polytechnic.
- Harry Edward Schulman TD, Member, North Creake Parish Council, Norfolk.
- John James Scully. For services to Amateur Dramatics in Bristol.
- Patrick Michael Scutt, Director Development, British Rail Property Board.
- Gordon Aldous Sewell, Executive Officer, Department of Energy.
- Margaret Sharich, lately Head Teacher, Penywaun Infants School, Aberdare, Mid-Glamorgan.
- Elizabeth Monica Shaw, Sister-in-Charge, Taylor Brooks House, Dartford and Gravesend Health Authority.
- Ian Kirk Shaw, Regional Secretary, Yorkshire Region, Royal Institute of British Architects.
- James Shaw, National Officer, Foundry Section, Amalgamated Engineering Union.
- Peter Henry Shepherd, Director, A.H. Worth.
- Derrick Sheridan, Senior Executive Officer, Department of Employment.
- John Nigel Shillabeer, Divisional Officer, Staffordshire Fire and Rescue Service.
- Shiv Ranjan Singh, Chairman, Bristol Race Equality Council.
- Jean Kathleen Skeggs, Senior Personal Secretary, Department of the Environment.
- Melita Slatter, Assistant Principal Engineer, Development Control, Buckinghamshire County Council.
- John Smillie, Staff Officer, Board of Inland Revenue.
- Graham Neil Smith. For political service.
- Isobel Anderson Smith, lately Assistant Headteacher Guidance, Craigroyston Community High School.
- Philip Dawson Smith, Chairman, Committee for the Employment of Disabled People, Leicestershire.
- Frederick Arthur Stallard, Manager Buyer Credits, General Electric Company plc.
- John Raymond Stevens. For services to the community in Swindon, Wiltshire.
- Thomas Stevenson, Inspector, Strathclyde Police.
- John Michael Stone, Chairman, Sims Food Group plc.
- Ian Stuart. For political service.
- Brian Roland Sutcliffe, Chairman, The Friends of the Settle and Carlisle Line.
- John Crawford Sutherland, Secretary, The Committee of Scottish Clearing Bankers.
- Ann Sutton, Textile Artist and Writer.
- Terence Albert Sutton, Deputy Editor, Dover Express.
- Richard Warwick Taper, Inspector, Board of Inland Revenue.
- Elizabeth Anne Tarr, Headteacher, Thornbury County Primary School.
- Isabel Millar Barr Taylor, Headteacher, Gretna Primary School.
- Sheila Telford. For political and public service.
- Colin Terris, Design and Marketing Director, Caithness Glass plc, Perth.
- Michael George Theobald, lately Chief Superintendent, Metropolitan Police.
- Helen Margaret Tatlor-Thompson. For public service.
- Keith Fulton Scott Thompson, Chairman, Express Engineering (Thompson) Ltd, and Exact Engineering (Thompson) Ltd.
- David John Tingey, Chief Inspecting Officer, Metropolitan Police (Civil Staff).
- Evelyn May Tomlinson, Deputy Leader, High Peak Borough Council; Member, Peak Park Joint Planning Board.
- Mike Townsend. For services to the Fishing Industry.
- Violet Martha Turner, lately Typing Manager, Ministry of Agriculture, Fisheries and Food.
- Josephine Gillespie Veitch, Records Co-ordinator, Foreign and Commonwealth Office.
- Elizabeth Waddell. For political service.
- Geoffrey John Wainwright, Principal Inspector Ancient Monuments, English Heritage.
- Douglas Dalton Walker, Inspector, Board of Inland Revenue.
- John Walker, Valuer I, Department of Finance and Personnel, Northern Ireland.
- Ernest Herbert Warrell, Organist and Choirmaster, King's College London.
- David George Wassell, Chief Landscape Adviser, Telford, Development Corporation.
- Brian Foreman Webb, Assistant Inspector, HM Fire Service Inspectorate.
- Charles John Frederick Webb, BEM, lately Driver, Government Car Service, Department of the Environment.
- Ernest Hoyland Webster, Technical Consultant, British Textile Technology Group.
- John Alfred Weston, Chief Commandant, Leicestershire Special Constabulary.
- Peter Richard White. For services to Waterways Conservation.
- Ivy Whiting, Branch Training Officer, British Red Cross Society, Humberside.
- Charlotte Helen Wilde, Member, The National Asthma Campaign.
- Hugh Pritchard Williams, Higher Professional Technology Officer, Welsh Office.
- Patricia Mary Miles Williams. For services to the Ceredigion, Red Cross Society.
- Mavis Wood, Education Officer (Careers Service), Bolton.
- Michael Alexander Wood, Director and Chief Executive, Ulster Cancer Foundation.
- Harry George Wrixton, Senior Professional and Technology Officer, Ministry of Defence.
- Kenneth Frank Yeo, Inspector (S), Board of Inland Revenue.

=== Imperial Service Order (ISO) ===
- Margaret Norma Armstrong, Principal, Department of the Environment, Northern Ireland.
- Peter Bellamy, Grade 7, Department of Employment.
- William Martin Bowman, Inspector (P), Board of Inland Revenue.
- June Doris Bulley, Grade 6, Training Enterprise Education Directorate, Department of Employment.
- Anthony John Burroughs, Chief Clerk, Supreme Court Taxing Office, Lord Chancellor's Department.
- Arthur Barry Cawthorn, lately Agricultural Adviser, British High Commission, Wellington, New Zealand.
- John Edwin Charlton, Inspector (P), Board of Inland Revenue.
- William Douglas RD, Senior Principal, Ministry of Defence.
- John Robert Morris Flucker, lately Principal, Scottish Office.
- Enid Mabel Foster, lately Grade 7, Department of Transport.
- Max Anthony Granger, Principal, Ministry of Defence.
- Alan Stuart Grover, Grade 7, Department of the Environment.
- William Hood, Assistant Collector, HM Board of Customs and Excise.
- John Mann, Grade 7, Department of Trade and Industry.
- Kenneth Marshall, lately Grade 7, Department of Social Security.
- Hugh McCormick, First Class Valuer, Board of Inland Revenue.
- Derek Edwin Parker, Senior Principal Civil Secretary, Ministry of Defence, Hong Kong.
- Desmond Cecil Pinnock. Foreign and Commonwealth Office.

=== Bar to British Empire Medal ===
Military Division

Army

- Staff Sergeant Roy Garnell BEM, Corps of Royal Military Police.

=== British Empire Medal ===
Military Division

Royal Navy

- Chief Petty Officer (Local Acting Charge Chief) Marine Engineering Artificer (ML) David Alexander Anderson.
- Chief Marine Engineering Mechanic (M) Brian David Bogie, Royal Naval Reserve.
- Chief Petty Officer (Operations) (Missile) (CAS) James Albert Cox.
- Colour Sergeant Keith Fordy, Royal Marines.
- Charge Chief Weapon Engineering Artificer David Victor Gerrey.
- Colour Sergeant Colin Graham Gillingham, Royal Marines
- Chief Petty Officer Air Engineering Artificer (WL) Raymond Michael Goodby.
- Charge Chief Marine Engineering Artificer (M) Patrick Ronald Halsey.
- Chief Petty Officer (Operations) (Missile) Barry Homer.
- Chief Petty Officer Airman (AH) William John Thomas Hulston.
- Enrolled Nurse (General) Teresa Margaret Kerr, Queen Alexandra's Royal Naval Nursing Service.
- Chief Petty Officer Marine Engineering Artificer (M) Geoffrey William Mecham.
- Chief Marine Engineering Mechanic (M) (CAS) Barry Nash.
- Chief Petty Officer (Operations) (Missile) Kevin Ronald Price.
- Colour Sergeant Robert William Sidney, Royal Marines.
- Chief Petty Officer (Operations) (HQ) Gordon William Peter Warner, Royal Naval Reserve.
- Chief Weapon Engineering Mechanic (O) Allan Whiting.
- Leading Writer John George Wilkinson.

Army

- Sergeant John David Andrews, Royal Army Ordnance Corps.
- Sergeant William Brian Andrews, Irish Guards.
- Staff Sergeant Christopher Aslett, Royal Corps of Signals.
- Sergeant Duncan Gregory Astley, Royal Army Medical Corps.
- Staff Sergeant Neville Walter James Barnard, Royal Corps of Signals.
- Staff Sergeant Stephen James Barratt, Royal Army Medical Corps.
- Bandsman Jason Bendix, The Royal Anglian Regiment.
- Corporal Andris Richards Berzins, Corps of Royal Military Police.
- Staff Sergeant Kenneth Barry Brown, Royal Tank Regiment.
- Staff Sergeant Jeffrey John Burgess, Corps of Royal Military Police.
- Staff Sergeant (now Warrant Officer Class 2) Neil Johnstone Burke, Corps of Royal Engineers.
- Lance Corporal Guy Crispin Douglas Burrows, The Royal Anglian Regiment.
- Sergeant Roderick Kenneth Butler, Corps of Royal Electrical and Mechanical Engineers.
- Staff Sergeant (now Warrant Officer Class 2) Robert Brian Cleaves, The Worcestershire and Sherwood Foresters Regiment, (29th/45th Foot), Territorial Army.
- Staff Sergeant Neil Andrew Coleman, Intelligence Corps.
- Staff Sergeant Albert William Dickens, The Duke of Lancaster's Own Yeomanry, Territorial Army.
- Staff Sergeant Reginald Arthur Albert Dicks, Army Catering Corps, Territorial Army.
- Staff Sergeant Alan Donnelly, The King's Own Royal Border Regiment.
- Corporal Ricky Alan Duff, Army Catering Corps.
- Staff Sergeant Mark Eaton, Royal Corps of Signals.
- Staff Sergeant Alexander Ferguson, The Royal Scots, (The Royal Regiment).
- Sergeant Graham James Finlayson, The Royal Regiment of Wales (24th/41st Foot), Territorial Army.
- Bombardier Kelvin Alan John Ford, Royal Regiment of Artillery.
- Staff Sergeant Geoffrey Harding, The Yorkshire Volunteers, Territorial Army.
- Staff Sergeant Geoffrey Harmer, The Queen's Regiment, Territorial Army.
- Staff Sergeant Hitparsand Thakali, 6th Queen Elizabeth's Own Gurkha Rifles.
- Corporal Robert Desmond Inglesant, Royal Corps of Signals.
- Staff Sergeant William David Ivison, The Queen's Lancashire Regiment.
- Private David Alan James, Royal Army Medical Corps.
- Staff Sergeant Richard Maurice Jones, Corps of Royal Military Police.
- Sergeant Clive George Edward Kersey, The Parachute Regiment.
- Staff Sergeant Krishna Gurung, Queen's Gurkha Signals.
- Staff Sergeant Leung Mak Shun, Gurkha Transport Regiment.
- Staff Sergeant Terence Arthur Lingard, Royal Regiment of Artillery, Territorial Army.
- Staff Sergeant (now Warrant Officer Class 2) Ronald Lowes, The Parachute Regiment, Territorial Army.
- Corporal Michael Arthur Lynn, The Royal Anglian Regiment.
- Sergeant Nigel Andrew Mandella, Intelligence Corps.
- Sergeant Francis David Mann, Royal Regiment of Artillery.
- Staff Sergeant Michael John Maughan, The Queen's Own Hussars.
- Gunner Anthony Patrick McKenzie, Royal Regiment of Artillery.
- Sergeant Michael Molyneux, 51st Highland Volunteers, Territorial Army.
- Corporal William Craig Moore, Royal Corps of Transport.
- Corporal Paul Anthony O'Callaghan, Army Catering Corps.
- Sergeant Robert Parry, The Parachute Regiment.
- Sergeant Kevin James Parsons, Corps of Royal Engineers.
- Sergeant Brian Michael Resoun, Royal Corps of Signals, Territorial Army.
- Staff Sergeant Michael William Roberts, Corps of Royal Engineers.
- Staff Sergeant Isaac Edward Robertson, The King's Own Royal Border Regiment.
- Staff Sergeant Anthony Paul Salter, Royal Corps of Signals.
- Staff Sergeant Reginald Sargeant, Grenadier Guards.
- Staff Sergeant Satish Rajpall Sharma, Royal Corps of Signals.
- Staff Sergeant Malcolm Small, The Light Infantry.
- Corporal Alfred Smith, 17th/21st Lancers.
- Staff Sergeant Gerard William Smith, Royal Corps of Signals.
- Staff Sergeant James John Smith, Royal Army Ordnance Corps.
- Staff Sergeant Philip Gregory Spencer, Royal Regiment of Artillery.
- Sergeant James Thom, Royal Regiment of Artillery.
- Corporal Alan James Tipping, Royal Corps of Transport.
- Staff Sergeant (now Warrant Officer Class 2) Charles Edward Tomkins, Royal Corps of Transport.
- Corporal Carl Roland Tomlinson, Corps of Royal Engineers.
- Staff Sergeant Lee Andrew Wookey, Royal Corps of Signals.
- Bombardier Brian Worden, Royal Regiment of Artillery.
- Corporal Robert Joseph Wright, The Staffordshire Regiment, (The Prince of Wales's).
- Staff Sergeant William Thomas Wright, Royal Army Ordnance Corps.

Royal Air Force

- Sergeant David John Baker.
- Flight Sergeant Brian Ronald Basting.
- Chief Technician Patrick Gerard Daly.
- Flight Sergeant Michael Joseph Fields.
- Flight Sergeant Robert Foster.
- Chief Technician Reginald John Gooding.
- Flight Sergeant Peter Darryll Gough.
- Sergeant Kenneth Robin Gray.
- Sergeant Ian Douglas George Keyan (Ret'd).
- Flight Sergeant Eric Raymond Lewis.
- Sergeant Donald Anthony Meechan.
- Flight Sergeant James Alexander Moffat.
- Chief Technician John Anthony Morley.
- Chief Technician (now Flight Sergeant) Michael Robert Morris.
- Sergeant Edward Pike, RAF Regiment.
- Flight Sergeant Adrian Peter Rawle.
- Sergeant David Eric Rose.
- Flight Sergeant John Vater.
- Flight Sergeant Roy James Waldock.
- Flight Sergeant Neil Edwin Williams.
- Flight Sergeant Lynn Williamson.
- Chief Technician Harry Kenneth Wilson.
- Sergeant Ian Colin Wright.
- Chief Technician Roland Henry Wright.

Civil Division

- Samuel Cyril Abbott, Craftsman, Northern Ireland Electricity.
- Ernest Henry John Adams, lately Sheetmetal Worker, Royal Aerospace Establishment, Farnborough, Ministry of Defence.
- John Patrick Airton, Superintendent Gardener, Durham Health Authority.
- Gwendoline Winifred Anson, Welfare Officer, West Midlands Branch, British Red Cross Society.
- Clive Ambler Appleton, Police Constable, Northamptonshire Police.
- George Paul Joseph Aquilina, Club Manager, Navy, Army and Air Force Institutes, (NAAFI).
- William Beattie Arlow, Groundsman, Collegian's Club, Belfast.
- Margaret Hilda Bailey. For services to the Alsager Committee, Cancer Research Campaign.
- Sigfroy Baldwin. For services to the West Midlands Royal British Legion, and Burma Star Association.
- Arthur Ernest Spence Barr. For services to the community and the Waterside Churches for Community Needs in Derry.
- Kathleen Ethel Bates, Membership and Examinations Supervisor, Chartered Institute of Building.
- Joy Bean. For services to the community in Biddenham, Bedford.
- Dorothy Beeson. For services to the Egham, Swan Sanctuary, Surrey.
- Terence Desmond Belshaw, Deputy Area Commissioner, St. John Ambulance Brigade.
- Alexander Charles Benford, Sergeant, Devon and Cornwall Constabulary.
- John Walter Charles Bilson, Process and General Supervisory (Grade E), Ministry of Defence.
- Norman Bimpson, Ambulance Liaison Officer, Preston Health Authority.
- John Ronald McMaster Black, Master of Works, Dundee Institute of Technology.
- Peter Anthony Bland. For services as Chauffeur to the Cheshire Lieutenancy.
- Agnes Isabella Blenkinship. For services to the community in Penrith, Cumbria.
- Eric Arthur Bonser, Volunteer Observer, Meteorological Office.
- Edith Boon. For services to Horses and Horse Riding in Saddleworth.
- Irene Lilian Boot, Resident Warden, Rotherham Metropolitan Borough Council.
- Barbara Gaynor Boxhall, Administrative Officer, Welsh Office.
- John Boyd, Sergeant, Royal Ulster Constabulary.
- John Michael Bradley, Constable, British Transport Police.
- Arthur Joseph Bray, Area Road Safety Organiser, Hereford and Worcester County Council.
- Miss Claire Mary Beatrice Bridcut, Personal Assistant to the Chairman and General Manager, Lancashire Family Practitioner Committee.
- Ann Brockington, Counters Manager, Witney, Branch Office, The Post Office.
- John William Brown, lately Housing Depot Manager, Leicester City Council.
- Robert Buchanan, Cook and Steward, Andrew Weir Shipping Ltd.
- Herbert Douglas Budd, Garagehand, Metropolitan Police.
- Bernard George Bullock, Senior Production Operator, J. C. Bamford Excavators Ltd.
- James Frederick Bunyan, Superintendent, Anglian Water plc.
- Royston Craig Burgess, lately Driver, Eastern Region, British Railways.
- Jennifer Bush, Constable, West Yorkshire Police.
- Cecelia Dorothy Butcher, Postmistress, Rudgwick, West Sussex.
- Arthur Henry Ernest Butler, lately Company Sergeant Major, Scarborough College, Combined Cadet Force.
- Eric Butler, Workshop Foreman, Durham Fire Brigade.
- Mary Pamela Care. For services to the Kingston and Merton Boys' Brigade.
- Avanda Murylene Carter, Administrative Officer, United Kingdom Atomic Energy Authority.
- Marcelle Yvonne Carter, Centre Organiser, Norwich Branch, British Red Cross Society.
- Maurice Owen Case. For services to Young People in Dorset.
- Jacqueline Iris Cashmore. For services to Animal Rescue in Kenilworth, Warwickshire.
- Sandra Chenery, Secretary to Chief Constable, Suffolk Constabulary.
- George Benjamin Cheshire. For services to the Long Eaton, Operatic Society.
- Elsie Ann Christie. For services to the Angus District Council.
- Robert Edwin Clapham, Arbroath, Town Missionary.
- Brian Arthur Clark, Senior Operating Department Assistant, Southmead Hospital, Bristol.
- Albert Wilfred Colley, Service Supervisor, West Midlands British Gas plc.
- William Overton Conboy, lately Caretaker, St. Wilfrid's Catholic High School, West Yorkshire.
- James Conlon. For services to the Mount St. Nicholas Parish Action for Community Employment Project in Co. Antrim.
- Sydney Alfred George Cook. For services to Sport and the community in Windlesham, Surrey.
- Margaret Cooper, Personal Secretary, Department of Transport.
- Basil Donald James Coppard, Leading Hand Carpenter, Department of the Environment.
- James Andrew Coyle. For services to the Cockermouth, Mountain Rescue Team.
- Cornelious Crowley. Foreman Porter, University College London.
- Edmund Robert Bolam Cummings, Fireman Retained, Northumberland Fire and Rescue Service.
- Ronald Arthur Charles Victor Cummins. For services to the community in Nettlebed, Oxfordshire.
- Thomas Davidson, Supervisor, Remploy.
- Brian Hayes Davies. Foreign and Commonwealth Office.
- Harry Walton Davies. For services to MENCAP, in Smethwick, West Midlands.
- Joy Florence Davies. For services to the community in Leominster, Herefordshire.
- Richard Archibald Davis, Postman, Bristol Letter District Office, The Post Office.
- David Harry Dawson, Director, Dawson Lightning Conductors Ltd.
- Peggy Marjorie Dean. For services to the community in St Albans, Hertfordshire.
- Paul Vernon Derek Deburgh, Freelance Film Restorer.
- Francis John Disney, Prison Officer, HM Prison Shepton Mallet.
- Ann Dixon, Administrative Officer, Department of Social Security.
- Frank Dixon. For services to the community in Melbourne, Derbyshire.
- James Ormandy Dixon, Chief Technician, Stott Park Bobbin Mill.
- Brian David Donnell, Chief Petty Officer Instructor, Lincoln Unit Sea Cadet Corps.
- Margaret Drain. For services to the community in Ayrshire.
- Anne Drysdale, lately Senior Commercial Officer, International Military Services Ltd.
- Dorothy Duxbury, Caretaker, Woodnook County Primary School, Blackburn.
- Ivy Marie Dye, Clerical Officer, General Optical Council.
- Annie Eccles, Ward Orderly, Mater Infirmorum Hospital, Belfast.
- William James Edmunds, Burner, Property Services Agency, Department of the Environment.
- Albert Edwards, Ganger, Newborough Forest, Forestry Commission (Wales).
- Valentine Albert Eggleston, Prepayment Collector, Southern British Gas plc.
- Irene Violet Elliott, Support Manager, Department of Health.
- Doris English. For services to the community in Wakefield, West Yorkshire.
- Asneth Jane Evans, Typist, Board of Customs and Excise.
- Constance Eileen Harrison Fawcett. For services to the community in Nottingham.
- William Clifford Fennell. Forest Craftsman, Ministry of Agriculture, Fisheries and Food (Forestry Commission).
- Donald Grenville Few, Treasurer and Welfare Officer, Cambridge Branch, Far Eastern Prisoners of War Association.
- Edward William Finch. For services to the Blind in Thetford, Norfolk.
- Campbell Findlay, Sergeant, Northumbria Police.
- Ronald Albert Fisher. For services to the Blind in Ripon, North Yorkshire.
- Kenneth Frank Fitzjohn, Constable, Ministry of Defence Police, Ministry of Defence.
- Donald Wells Foord, Regional Administrative Officer, Chartered Institute of Building.
- Davannah Isobel Mitchell Merson Forbes, Accident Prevention Officer, Grampian Regional Council.
- Charles Frederick Ford, Caretaker, Hawley Primary School, Hampshire.
- Peter Fox, lately for services to the Motorcyclist Training Scheme of the former Royal Automobile Club, and Auto-Cycle Union.
- Derek France, Dust Suppression Officer, British Coal Corporation.
- Esther French, Officer-in-Charge, Group Home for the Mentally Handicapped, Newport.
- Noel Thomas Frizell, Prison Officer, Northern Ireland Prison Service.
- Miss Pamela Iris Fry, Administrative Officer, Ministry of Defence.
- Albert John Fynney, Tractor Driver, Slindon House Farm.
- Edmund Francis Hubert Gale. For services to Firmin and Sons plc.
- Miss Martha Rene Gallagher, lately Social Security Officer 2, Department of Health and Social Services, Northern Ireland Civil Service.
- William James George, School Bus Driver, Southern Education and Library Board.
- William Davies Gibson. Foreman, Scottish Power.
- Barbara Marion Glendinning. For services to the Devizes Women's Royal Voluntary Service.
- Lettice Ursula Godfrey. For services to the community in Dorchester on Thames, Oxfordshire.
- Jean Alison Golding, lately Support Grade Band 2, Board of Customs and Excise.
- John Gosling, Convenor Steward, Union of Construction, Allied Trades and Technicians.
- Betty Irene Green, Secretary, Churchill Hospital, Oxford.
- Violet May Green, Support Grade Band 1, Laboratory of the Government Chemist, Department of Trade and Industry.
- Joan Greenall, School Crossing Patrol, Cumbria County Council.
- John Joseph Greene, Head Porter, Queen Mary College, University of London.
- Adelaide Felicia Greenidge, Matron, Metropolitan Police.
- Lily Alberta Helen Gregory. For services to the Women's Royal Voluntary Service Speech-after-Stroke Clubs.
- Catherine Frances Guilding. For services to the community in Bushley, Gloucestershire.
- Joan Mary Hall, Senior Telephonist, British Steel Seamless Tubes.
- Bernard Joseph Hand, Shift Supervisor, Calder Hall, British Nuclear Fuels.
- William Curtis Harley, Road Signs and Markings Superintendent, North Tyneside Council.
- Alexander Harper, Site Manager, Double Dykes Travelling People Site, Perth, Scotland.
- Richard Russell Harpur. For services to the St. John Ambulance Brigade.
- Malcolm John Harris, Postman, Batley District Office, The Post Office.
- Gertrude Hart. For services to the community in Elmstead Market, Essex.
- John Richard Hayfield. For services to the Upton Branch, Royal British Legion.
- Mary Fisher Hunter Heaney. For services to the community in Mosspark, Glasgow.
- Ronald Scott Henderson, Administrative Officer, Dounreay, United Kingdom Atomic Energy Authority.
- Kenneth Hylton Henry, lately Coxswain of the Aith Shetland Lifeboat.
- Percy Leslie Edwin Hewitt, Excavator Driver, Lower Bure, Halvergate Fleet, and Acle Marshes Internal Drainage Board.
- Sylvia Kathleen Hewitt, Support Grade Band 1, Department of Trade and Industry.
- Norman Basil Higgins, Motor Transport Driver, Ministry of Defence.
- Frederick John Hill, Sergeant, Metropolitan Police.
- Ernest Archibald Holwill. For services to the community in Torrington, Devon.
- James Arthur Horton, Head Observer, No.7 Group, Bedford Royal Observer Corps.
- Reginald Horton, Construction Foreman, Leicestershire County Council.
- Margaret Annie Houghton. For services to the community in Welton, Lincolnshire.
- Peter Howe, Sergeant, Cleveland Constabulary.
- Anthony Hudson, Divisional Superintendent, High Wycombe Division, St. John Ambulance Brigade.
- Ronald Thomas Humphreys, General Handyman, Portland Training College for the Disabled, Mansfield.
- Alan William Hutchings, Process and General Supervisory Grade C, Ministry of Defence.
- Edward Francis Jackson. For services to the Royal Air Forces Association.
- Francis Agnes Jackson, Domestic Assistant, Muckamore Abbey Hospital, Antrim.
- Joan Margaret Jay, Secretary to the Director, National Wool Textile Export Corporation.
- Arthur Philip Jellings, Driver, London Midland Region, British Railways.
- George Thomas Edward Jellings. For services to Campanology.
- Maurice John . For services to the community in Hay-on-Wye.
- Robert Johnson, lately Milk Roundsman.
- Clifford William Jones, Water Treatment Superintendent, The South Staffordshire Water Company.
- Reverend Richard Jones, Chaplain, Royal British Legion, Wales.
- Joyce Joynson. For services to the Moray District Women's Royal Voluntary Service.
- David Albert Juland, Senior Transmitter Technician, Daventry, British Broadcasting Corporation.
- Francis Patrick Keenan, Production Controller, London Underground Ltd.
- John Kelly, Distribution Supervisor, South Western British Gas plc.
- Lilian Mary Kennedy, Warehouse Employee, Hall Forster and Company Ltd.
- Malcolm Keslake, Instructional Officer I, HM Prison Channings Wood.
- Cecily King. For services to the community in Tamworth, Staffordshire.
- Lilian Daisy Lamb, lately Support Grade Band 1 (Senior Messenger), Home Office.
- Francis William Lane, lately Headquarters Administrator, Young Men's Christian Association.
- Peter John Langridge, Personnel Officer, Southern Water plc.
- Bernard Victor Laughlin, Bailiff, Brentwood County Court, Lord Chancellor's Department.
- Alastair Thomas John Lean, Sub-Officer Retained, Cornwall Fire Brigade.
- James Lemin, Ambulanceman, Newcastle-upon-Tyne.
- Alec Lewis, lately Secretary, 8th Army Veterans' Association.
- Robert John Lewis, Process and General Supervisory Grade C, Ministry of Defence.
- Trevor Cenydd Lewis. For services to the Royal Marine Light Infantry Cadet Marching Band.
- George Hawkins Lilly, Process Worker, Calder Hall, British Nuclear Fuels.
- Dorothy Jean Lister, Typist, Ministry of Defence.
- Miss Euphemia Bryce Little, Administrative Officer, Department of Agriculture for Scotland, Scottish Office.
- David James Henry Lock, lately Administrative Officer, Ministry of Defence.
- Joyce Pamela Lock, lately Support Manager 3 (Telephone Supervisor), Ministry of Defence.
- Ronald Charles Lockley, lately Chief Clerk, Rugby Cement.
- Annette Diana Logan, Nursing Auxiliary, Basingstoke District Hospital.
- Edward Charles Long. For services to the Lockwood Day Centre, Surrey.
- William MacDonald, Field Assistant Driver, Ordnance Survey, Department of the Environment.
- William James George MacDonald, Stores Officer Grade C, Ministry of Defence.
- Euphemia Christeen Munro MacKinnon, lately Administrative Officer, Forestry Commission (Scotland).
- John Stewart MacLennan, Fitter, Scottish Region, British Railways.
- Clive MacLeod, Police Constable, City of London Police.
- Muriel Mainwood, Prison Auxiliary, HM Young Offenders Institution Werrington.
- Margaret Doreen March, lately Administrative Officer, Ministry of Agriculture, Fisheries and Food.
- Annie Maria Mark, Ambulance Officer, British Red Cross Society.
- David Moore Matthews, Sergeant, Royal Ulster Constabulary.
- Lilian Elizabeth McAvoy, Administrative Officer, Peterborough Passport Office, Home Office.
- Elizabeth McCarthy, Laundry Maid, Hillsborough Castle, Northern Ireland Civil Service.
- Miss Mary Winifred McCloskey, School Meals Supervisor, St. Louise's School, Belfast.
- Fredrick Victor McCurry, Sergeant Royal Ulster Constabulary.
- Joseph McDonald, Driver, Ulsterbus Ltd.
- David Henry McDonald McLauchlan, lately Principal Officer, HM Prison Friarton.
- Gilbert McMillan, Farm Grieve, D. W. Gourlay and Company.
- James Pachelli McSorley, Site Supervisor, Enterprise Ulster.
- Carole Margaret Meek, Administrative Officer, Department of Energy.
- Harold Vernon Meek, Station Supervisor, Western Region British Railways.
- Charles Still Louttit Millar, Clerk of Works, Orkney Islands Council.
- Lilian Mabel Mitchell, Administrative Officer, Office of Fair Trading, Department of Trade and Industry.
- James Pearl Moffat, Flockmaster.
- Margaret Imelda Moran. For services to the Multiple Sclerosis Action Group in County Londonderry.
- John William Morgan, Travelling Ticket Inspector, London Midland Region, British Railways.
- George Edward Morris, Catering Manager, Rampton Hospital, Nottinghamshire.
- Miss Frances Duke Smith Mullan, Cook-in-Charge, Burnfoot Primary School, Dungiven, Co. Londonderry.
- Frank Mytton, Production Worker, Warrington, Workshop for the Disabled.
- Josephine Jean Nash, Administration Officer, St. Albans Unit, Sea Cadet Corps.
- Nellie Needham, Laundry Supervisor, St George's Hospital, Tooting.
- Victor George Nelson, lately Courtkeeper, Lord Chancellor's Department.
- William Nelson, Subpostmaster, South Normanton, The Post Office.
- Harold Claud Nobes, Farm Worker, Robert Watts Farms.
- Derek James Noblett, Police Constable, Metropolitan Police.
- James O'Rourke. Foreman, Royal Strathclyde Blindcraft Industries.
- Cecilia Gertrude O'Shea. For services to Physically and Mentally Handicapped Children in Surrey.
- Peter Owen, Driver, Western Region, British Railways.
- Flora Elizabeth Martha Parker. For services to the Sunderland Women's Royal Voluntary Service.
- Thomas Peter Parry, Radiation and Vacuum Officer, Science and Engineering Research Council.
- Barbara Perriss, Administrative Officer, Ministry of Defence.
- Hilda Alice May Perry, Administrative Assistant, Ministry of Defence.
- Daphne Gertrude Pester, Administrative Officer, Ministry of Defence.
- Edward William Piper, Works Engineer, Stone Manganese Marine Ltd.
- Edward Arthur Pither, Sub-Officer Retained, Hampshire Fire Service.
- June Beverly Pitts. For services to the Leeds Women's Royal Voluntary Service.
- Elizabeth Julia Poczopko, lately Assistant Secretary Joint Committee of St. John of Jerusalem and the British Red Cross Society.
- Eric Gordon Poole, Production Supervisor, British Aerospace (Military Aircraft) Ltd.
- Maurice Richard Potter, lately Examinations Administrator, Royal Institution of Chartered Surveyors.
- Emyr Pugh, Craft Attendant, Nuclear Electric plc.
- David Stanley Purdy. Foreman, Property Services Agency, Department of the Environment.
- Catherine Jane Rae, Assistant Linen Service Manager, Ninewells Hospital, Dundee.
- Albert William Randolph, Shorthand Typist, Cossor Electronics Ltd.
- Denis James Charles Ray, lately Baker, Smarts Hill Bakery.
- Valeda May Rees. For services to the community in Aberdare.
- Christina McFarlane Reid. For services to the Kilbirnie, and Glengarnock, Age Concern.
- Hazel Mary Temple Reid, Telephonist, Department of the Environment, Northern Ireland Civil Service.
- George William Reincke, Chairman's Chauffeur, Essex County Council.
- Muriel Eva Rich, Audio Typist, South Wales Electricity plc.
- James Gordon Richards, District Service Officer, Southern British Gas plc.
- Margaret Richards, Administrative Officer, Driver and Vehicle Licensing Centre, Swansea, Department of Transport.
- Peter Francis Richardson. For services to the Romford, Royal British Legion Boys' Band.
- Joan Rimmer. For services to the community in Warrington, Cheshire.
- Brenda Violet Robbins, School Crossing Patrol, Blean County Primary School, Canterbury.
- Norman Roberts, lately Administrative Officer, Ministry of Defence.
- Diane Robinson, Cleaner, Coventry Letter District, The Post Office.
- Maureen Joyce Robinson, Personal Secretary, Foreign and Commonwealth Office.
- Arnold Herbert Rosher, Chairman's Chauffeur, Eastern Electricity plc.
- Muriel Winifred Rossiter, lately Librarian, The Marine Society.
- George Rowley, Service Engineer, West Midlands British Gas plc.
- Evelyn Elizabeth Jane Ruck. For services to the community in Canterbury, Kent.
- Stella May Ruff, Volunteer Typist, Victoria and Albert Museum.
- Frank Eric Ruggles, Sergeant, Essex Police.
- Clarice Kate Rumble. For services to the Wycombe General Hospital, League of Friends.
- Cyril David John Russell. For services to the New Tredegar Community Centre, Gwent.
- Joan Lilian Russell, Administrative Officer, Kent Army Cadet Force.
- Ralph Joseph Ryan, Constable, Merseyside Police.
- Stanley Frederick Salmon, lately Support Grade Band 2 (Usher), Lord Chancellor's Department.
- Rodney William Samuels, Police Constable, Bedfordshire Police.
- Robert Renwick Sanderson, Warehouse Manager, Robert Noble Ltd.
- George Henry Sands. For services to the Leukaemia Fund Trust, Walton Hospital, Liverpool.
- Anthony Martin Sansome. For services to the Smethwick Old Church Scout Group.
- David Graham Sargent, Detective Constable, West Midlands Police.
- William Rennie Shanks. For services to the Balerno Burns Club.
- Mella Elizabeth Shannon, Cook, Northern Ireland Railways.
- George Frank Shaw, Divisional Superintendent, British Rail Division, Rugby St. John Ambulance Brigade.
- Gladys Elizabeth Shaw, lately Administrative Officer, Ministry of Agriculture, Fisheries and Food.
- Kenneth Lawrence Sherwood, lately Parks Manager, Middlesbrough District Council.
- James Marr Davidson Sim, lately Vehicle Mechanic, Ministry of Defence.
- Albert Victor Skinner, Chargeman, Eastern Region British Railways.
- Robert David Smith, Constable, Royal Ulster Constabulary.
- John Spink, Qualified Ambulanceman, West Midlands Regional Health Authority.
- Harold James William Stagey. For services to the Tedburn St. Mary Parish Council.
- Leslie Stainthorp, Head Custodian, Whitby Abbey.
- Kenneth George Starky, Local Officer II, Department of Social Security.
- Barbara Helen Statham. For services to the Bedfordshire Women's Royal Voluntary Service.
- Janette Stewart, Personal Secretary, Scottish Office.
- Morag Donnelly Stewart, Senior Pharmacy Technician, Glasgow Royal Infirmary.
- William MacDonald Stirton, Head Stockman, Stirling Auction Mart.
- William Joseph Storer, Mace-bearer to Lord Mayor, Stoke-on-Trent City Council.
- Kevin Storey, Postal Officer, Silver Street Branch Office, The Post Office.
- Robin Sunley. Foreman Electrician, Yorkshire Electricity Group plc.
- Derek Fleetwood Tasker, Observer No.21 Group, Preston Royal Observer Corps.
- John Henry Tatterton, Constable, West Yorkshire Police.
- Ernest Charles Taylor, lately Administrative Officer, Department of Employment.
- Alan Frederick Thomas, Sergeant, Metropolitan Police.
- Charles Alfred Thomas, Petty Officer (Bosun), Cunard Line Ltd.
- George Edmund Thompson, Marine Pilot, Harwich Haven Authority.
- Evelyn May Thorne. For services to the communities in Crudwell, and Oaksey, Wiltshire, and Ashley, Gloucestershire.
- Jean Todd. For services to the Bromley Women's Royal Voluntary Service.
- James Eric Tomlinson, Process and General Supervisory Grade B, Science and Engineering Research Council.
- Michael Edwin Towndrow, Postal Officer, Gloucester Letter District Office, The Post Office.
- Edgar George Harold Tucker TD, lately Technical Officer, British Telecommunications plc.
- Keith Allan Tutty, Industrial Craftsman, Transport Road Research Laboratory, Department of Transport.
- Kathleen Mary Tyson. For services to the Girl Guides Association.
- Christopher Bernard Upham, Detective Constable, Cheshire Constabulary.
- Edwin John Vanstone, School Crossing Patrol, Devon County Council.
- Pauline Sylvia Verlander, Administrative Officer, Office of Fair Trading, Department of Trade and Industry.
- Iris May Voinus, Typist, Department of Social Security.
- William Roy Wadeson, Constable, Cumbria Constabulary.
- Derek Harry Walker, Workshop Manager, London Fire Brigade.
- David William Walkerdine, Technical Sales Representative, East Midlands British Gas plc.
- Alan William Waller. For services to the 13th Bromley Company Boys' Brigade.
- Stanley Wallwork, Works Manager, H. Marcel Guest Ltd.
- Stanley Cyril Walters. For services to the South Wales Cancer Research Council.
- Joyce Mary Walton. For services to the Lincoln Women's Royal Voluntary Service.
- Jacob Ralph Warren, lately Head Forester, Pitcairn Island, Foreign and Commonwealth Office.
- Irene Muriel Webb, School Crossing Patrol, St. Luke's Church of England First School, Redditch, Worcestershire.
- Robert Webster, Fireman, Wick Airport.
- John Westwell. For services to the Burton-on-Trent Scout Band.
- Roy Allen Wheeler, Tanker Station Supervisor, Guinness plc.
- Brian Frederick Whitworth, Head Groundsman, London School of Economics.
- Henry Wilkinson, Head Observer No.21 Group, Preston Royal Observer Corps.
- Bryn Owen Williams, Professional Toastmaster.
- Terry Joseph James Kettle-Williams, Stores Officer Grade C, Ministry of Defence.
- Patricia Joan Wilsher, Personal Secretary, Ministry of Defence.
- Jane Wilson, lately Subpostmistress, Elvanfoot, Sub-Office Biggar, The Post Office.
- John Wilson, Senior Warden Royal Society for the Protection of Birds.
- John Henry Wilson. For services to the Handicapped in Fife.
- Thomas William Winfield, Base Engineer, Brymon Airways.
- George Albert Wood. For services to the Derby Council for Voluntary Service.
- Alan Woodcock, Quality Engineer, Jasmin plc.
- Maurice Alec Woodman, Police Constable, Metropolitan Police.
- Joseph Raymond Wyatt, Station Officer Retained, Avon Fire Brigade.
- Heulwen Kathleen Yates, Civilian Clerk, Gwent Constabulary.
- David Young, Underground Mechanic, British Coal Corporation.

=== Air Force Cross (AFC) ===
Royal Navy

- Acting Lieutenant-Commander Peter Kenneth Hulett.

Royal Air Force

- Squadron Leader David Reginald Bagshaw.
- Squadron Leader Timothy William Leslie Miller.

=== Royal Red Cross ===
==== Members (RRC) ====
Army

- Lieutenant-Colonel Thomas James Allsopp, Royal Army Medical Corps, Territorial Army.
- Colonel Shelia Margaret Cooper, A.R.R.C., Queen Alexandra's Royal Army Nursing Corps.
- Major Margaret Macmillan MacDonald, Queen Alexandra's Royal Army Nursing Corps.

==== Associates (ARRC) ====
Army

- Major Jean Alexander, Queen Alexandra's Royal Army Nursing Corps.
- Major Patricia Ann McKay, Queen Alexandra's Royal Army Nursing Corps.
- Major Stephanie Lynn Margaret Webster, Queen Alexandra's Royal Army Nursing Corps.

Royal Air Force

- Squadron Leader Angela Juliette Scofield, Princess Mary's Royal Air Force Nursing Service.

=== Queen's Police Medal (QPM) ===
England and Wales

- John William Botterill, Assistant Chief Constable, West Yorkshire Police.
- Kenneth Philip Douglas Cooper, Assistant Chief Constable, Northamptonshire Police.
- Percy Dennis Gatiss, Assistant Chief Constable, Durham Constabulary.
- Richard Henry Gregory, Chief Superintendent, Derbyshire Constabulary.
- Peter Neville Howse, Deputy Chief Constable, Norfolk Constabulary.
- Edward John Innes, Detective Chief Superintendent, British Transport Police.
- William Robert Lawrence, Chief Constable, South Wales Constabulary.
- Pauline Cynthia Low, lately Chief Superintendent, Avon and Somerset Constabulary.
- Robert Clive Marsh, Commander, Metropolitan Police.
- John Edward Metcalfe, Deputy Assistant Commissioner, Metropolitan Police.
- Robert Aubrey Mills, lately Chief Superintendent, West Midlands Police.
- Henry Donald Milner, Detective Constable, Greater Manchester Police.
- Alan Ronald Rose, Assistant Chief Constable, Dorset Police.
- Michael Bradley Taylor, Deputy Assistant Commissioner, Metropolitan Police.
- William Taylor, Assistant Commissioner, Metropolitan Police.
- Raymond White, Chief Constable, Dyfed Powys Police.
- Raymond William Wood, lately Chief Inspector, Nottinghamshire Constabulary.
- Arthur Ernest Yates, Constable, Metropolitan Police.

Northern Ireland

- Robert Keith Donnelly, Chief Inspector, Royal Ulster Constabulary.
- Francis Thomas Gilleece, Chief Inspector, Royal Ulster Constabulary.

Scotland

- David Leith Allan, Assistant Chief Constable, Deputy Commandant, Scottish Police College.
- Ian Malcolm Gordon, Superintendent, Grampian Police.
- Alistair Birch Ritchie, Detective Superintendent, Grampian Police.

=== Queen's Fire Service Medal (QFSM) ===
England and Wales

- Jeremy Wilson Beech, Chief Officer, Kent Fire Brigade.
- Adrian Robert Currie, Chief Officer, Gloucestershire Fire and Rescue Service.
- Frank Noel David, Assistant Chief Officer, London Fire Brigade.
- David Harry Blackwell Seal, Divisional Officer III, Warwickshire Fire and Rescue Service.
- John Henry Taylor, Deputy Assistant Chief Officer, London Fire Brigade.

=== Queen's Commendation for Valuable Service in the Air ===
Royal Navy

- Lieutenant-Commander Allan James Howden.
- Chief Petty Officer Aircrewman Steven Lionel McNaughton.
- Lieutenant-Commander Ross Thoburn.

Army

- Major David Robert Charles Woods, Army Air Corps.

Royal Air Force

- Flight Lieutenant David Alexander Beveridge.
- Squadron Leader Thomas Leonard Boyle.
- Flight Lieutenant Max Burton.
- Flight Lieutenant John Barrie Clark.
- Flight Lieutenant Andrew Gerald Dakin.
- Squadron Leader Keith Everest.
- Flight Lieutenant David Keith Fletcher.
- Flight Lieutenant Peter Wayne Gregory.
- Squadron Leader Michael John Harwood.
- Squadron Leader Edward Gareth Jones.
- Master Aircrew John Richard Denis Mellor.
- Flight Lieutenant Paul Michael Millikin.
- Squadron Leader Christopher Hugh Moran.
- Squadron Leader Garry Reginald Roy Porter.
- Squadron Leader Michael John Whybro.

Civil

- Richard Byron Duckenfield, Qualified Flying Instructor, Riyadh, British Aerospace (Military Aircraft) Ltd.

== Diplomatic Service and Overseas ==
=== Order of St Michael and St George ===
==== Knight Grand Cross (GCMG) ====
- Sir David Wilson, K.C.M.G., Governor, and Commander-in-Chief, Hong Kong.

==== Knights Commander (KCMG) ====
- William James Adams, C.M.G., HM Ambassador, Cairo.
- Patrick Robin Fearn, C.M.G., HM Ambassador, Madrid.
- John Olav Kerr, C.M.G., UK Permanent Representative to the European Community, Brussels.
- William Roger Tomkys, C.M.G., British High Commissioner, Nairobi.

==== Companions (CMG) ====
- Henry John Chumas, TD, lately Director, European Commission, Brussels.
- Edward John Field, Minister, HM Embassy, Tokyo.
- Robin Andrew Kealy, lately Counsellor and Consul-General, HM Embassy Baghdad.
- David Brian Carleton Logan, HM Embassy Moscow.
- Mark Anthony Marshall, HM Ambassador Sana'a.
- Michael Charles Oatley, OBE, Foreign and Commonwealth Office.
- Thomas Legh Richardson, Minister and Deputy Permanent Representative United Kingdom Mission to the United Nations, New York.
- Rosemary Jane Spencer, Foreign and Commonwealth Office.
- David Everard Tatham, HM Ambassador Beirut.
- John Stephen Wall, LVO, Foreign and Commonwealth Office.

=== Order of the British Empire ===
==== Commanders (CBE) ====
Civil Division

- Chan Wa-Shek, I.S.O., J.P., Commissioner for Correctional Services, Hong Kong.
- Cheung Yan-lung, OBE, J.P. For public services in Hong Kong.
- Augustine Chui Kam, J.P., Secretary for Recreation and Culture, Hong Kong.
- Nigel Clayton. For services to British commercial interests and to the community in Natal.
- Michael Dealtry, lately Deputy Head, Monetary and Economic Department, Bank for International Settlements, Basel.
- Michael Edward John Gore, lately HM Ambassador Monrovia.
- Brian Anthony Lavers. For services to British commercial and community interests in Nigeria.
- Niall MacDermot, OBE, QC, lately Secretary-General, International Commission of Jurists, Geneva.
- Anthony McClellan, lately Director, European Commission Legal Service, Brussels.
- Justice Rory O'Connor, Judge of the High Court Hong Kong.

==== Officers (OBE) ====
Civil Division

- Raymond Joseph Addington. For services to British commercial interests in Canada.
- Dr, Austin Keith Auckland. For services to horticultural development in the Philippines.
- Leslie Walter Boxer, lately Deputy Head of Research and Development, IEA, Paris.
- Dr. Andrew Adam Brzechwa-Ajdukiewicz. For medical services to the community in the Solomon Islands.
- Gordon Edward Charles Burrows. For services to British commercial interests in Rome.
- John Michael Candlish, lately British Exhibition Unit, Kiev.
- Ronald Robert Capie, MBE, lately British Deputy High Commissioner, Port of Spain.
- Philip Hugh Champniss. For services to British aviation interests in Saudi Arabia.
- Philip Victor Coggins. For services to British commercial and community interests in Guatemala.
- Dr, Michael John Condon, Principal Dental Officer, Ministry of Health, Botswana.
- John Alexander Coope, British Council Representative, Colombia.
- Florence Edna Daley, Permanent Secretary, Ministry of Communications and Works, Montserrat.
- The Venerable Thomas Dyson, Archdeacon of Bermuda.
- John Richard Harry Evans, lately First Secretary, HM Embassy Caracas.
- Guy Dunning George Gribble, lately Head of Interpreting Services, NATO HQ, Brussels.
- Kenneth Heald, First Secretary and Consul-General HM Embassy Madrid.
- Michael John Holden, lately Fisheries Division, EC Commission, Brussels.
- Alan Norman Hoole, Deputy Governor, Anguilla.
- Allen Henry John Jenkins, MBE, lately Police Special Branch Adviser, Government of Belize.
- Edward Stanley Jones. For services to British commercial and community interests in Los Angeles.
- Malcolm Stuart Keeley. For services to British commercial and community interests in Tanzania.
- Captain Charles Leonard Kirkconnell. For public and community services in the Cayman Islands.
- Lau Wan-sum, J.P. For public and community services in Hong Kong.
- David Li Kwok-po, J.P. For public and community services in Hong Kong.
- Peter Edward Lyner, lately Cultural Attache (British Council), HM Embassy Sofia.
- Professor Donald Gillies McLarty. For services to medical education in Tanzania.
- Anthony Reginald Matthews, MBE. For services to British commercial interests in the United States.
- David John Miller. For services to the British community in Tokyo.
- Roy Duffell Mitchell. For services to British commercial and community interests in Paris.
- Iain Richard Murray, Chargé d'Affaires HM Embassy San Salvador.
- Ransom James Murray. For services to British commercial interests in Nigeria.
- George Simeon Papadopoulos, lately Deputy Director of Education, OECD, Paris.
- Alison Jane Phillips, lately First Secretary, HM Embassy Paris.
- Dr, John William Powell. For services to technical education in Ghana.
- Michael James Schofield. For services to British commercial interests in Japan.
- Solomon Abraham Seruya. For public services in Gibraltar.
- Alan William Shave, First Secretary and Consul, HM Embassy La Paz.
- William Sheckleston, MBE, Vice-Consul British Embassy Office Berlin.
- James So Yiu-cho, J.P., Director of Urban Services, Hong Kong.
- Melvyn Richard Stewart. For services to British commercial interests in Dubai.
- Michael Hardwick Tomalin. For services to the British community in Tokyo.
- John Campbell Matheson Trail. For services to animal husbandry in Africa.

==== Members (MBE) ====
Civil Division'

- Elizabeth Jane Allan-Ritson. For services to the British community in Antwerp.
- Attallah Joseph Attallah, Visa Examiner, HM Embassy Beirut.
- John Clement Buffery, lately Communications Officer, Cyprus.
- Jocelyn Mary Ricci Cammack, Consular Clerk, HM Embassy Buenos Aires.
- Chow Kwan-sing. For community services in Hong Kong.
- Lloyd Edwin Crooker, lately Second Secretary, British Embassy Office Berlin.
- John George William Crossland, Head of Communications Section, HM Embassy Bonn.
- Gwendoline Mary Gushing. For educational and welfare services to the community in South India.
- Ada Verbena Daniels, Registrar of Companies, Ministry of Finance, Bermuda.
- Graham Vaughan De Vere Lane, lately Third Secretary (Communications), HM Embassy Moscow.
- Ann Mary Douthwaite, lately Personal Assistant to HM Ambassador Algiers.
- Ilid Evans, lately Senior Security Officer, HM Embassy Baghdad.
- Frances Irene Freeman, lately Translator, NATO HQ, Brussels.
- Fu Kam-hung, Assistant Director of Municipal Services, Hong Kong.
- Joseph Garcia. For services to journalism in Gibraltar.
- Kearney Sidney Gomez, Principal Secretary, Ministry of Communications, Cayman Islands.
- William Arthur Gomez. For services to music in Gibraltar.
- The Reverend Donald Morrison Harper. For services to the British community in Sicily.
- Alexander Hay, lately British Exhibition Unit, Kiev.
- Barbara Logan Hay, First Secretary (Information), HM Embassy Moscow.
- Lorna Phyllis Lalliede Lannoy Hayes. For services to the British community in Kenya.
- Joane Ethel Jordan. For welfare services to the community in Brussels.
- Dr, Anthony Lee Yip-chuen, Assistant Director, Shipping Register, Hong Kong.
- Richard Alfred Lee. For public and community services in Montserrat.
- Lo King-man. For services to education in Hong Kong.
- The Reverend Andrew Mair McCabe. For educational and welfare services to the community in Eastern India.
- Dr, Peter Roger Morgan. For services to the community in Zimbabwe.
- Mariejeanne Morphy-Karatza, Honorary British Vice-Consul, Patras, Greece.
- Joan Brown Learmonth Ellis Nakhla. For welfare services to the community in Cairo.
- George Charles Newman. For services to the British community in Berlin.
- Ng Kai-kai, Chief Maintenance Surveyor, Public Works Department, Hong Kong.
- Catherine Mary Park. For services to the British community in Paris.
- Christopher Alan Ramsden. For services to education in Somalia.
- Richard George Rowe, Vice-Consul, HM Consulate Seville.
- Michael Ernest Rowney, lately Vice-Consul, HM Embassy Monrovia.
- Clarence Saunders. For services to athletics in Bermuda.
- Stephen James Seaman, Second Secretary, HM Embassy Monrovia.
- Monika Maria Katharina Segbert, Librarian, British Council, Germany.
- Dr, Daniel Orlando Smith, Chief Medical Officer, British Virgin Islands.
- John Smith, Curator, Port Stanley Museum, Falkland Islands.
- Jean Margaret Spayne. For services to the British community in Lisbon.
- Margaret Goodwillie Stark. For services to the British community in Oslo.
- Susan Jayne Tucknott, Vice-Consul HM Embassy Beirut.
- Dr, Keith Mortimer Waddell. For medical welfare services to the community in Uganda.
- Margaret Pauline Waugh, lately Second Secretary and Consul, HM Embassy Baghdad.
- Edward John Williams. For services to the British community in Brunei.
- Mary Jane Wilson. For nursing welfare services to the community in Kenya.
- Laurence Allan Wright, BEM. For services to the British community in Monaco.
- Edward James MacGregor Potter, lately Greffier, and Chief Law Draftsman, States of Jersey.
- Brian Charles Sherhard, Grade 7, Treasury Solicitor's Department.
- Clifford William Smith, Inspector (P), Board of Inland Revenue.
- Sybil Joyce Smith, Grade 7, Department of Trade and Industry.
- Robert Spence, Principal Scientific Officer, Department of Economic Development, Northern Ireland.
- Derek Philip Stevens, Deputy Director, Wales Employment Service, Department of Employment.
- Frank Alfred Sumner, Principal, Department of Health.
- Brian Victor Surridge, Principal, Scottish Office.

=== Imperial Service Order (ISO) ===
- Hyder Hatim Tyebjee Barma, J.P., Director of Regional Services, Hong Kong.
- Benjamin Mok Ni-hung, J.P., Commissioner of Census and Statistics, Hong Kong.
- Michael Sze Cho-cheung, J.P., Director of Marine, Hong Kong.
- Patrick John Williamson, J.P., Commissioner of Customs and Excise, Hong Kong.

=== British Empire Medal ===
- Ana Maria Ballqui, Legal Secretary, Law Department, Gibraltar.
- Donald William Bonner, Steward and Chauffeur, Government House, Falkland Islands.
- Amy Chan Lim-chee. For services to Badminton in Hong Kong.
- Fok Yat-sang, lately Grade A Clerk, Naval Department, Hong Kong.
- Ling Chun-shing, Personal Chauffeur to the Chief Secretary, Hong Kong.
- Wong King-chiu, Grade III Section Leader, Civil Aid Services, Hong Kong.
- Marjorie May Young, lately Community Nursing Officer, St Helena.

=== Queen's Police Medal (QPM) ===
- Peter Chau Cham-chiu, C.P.M., Assistant Commissioner, Royal Hong Kong Auxiliary Police Force.
- Peter Wong Tsan-kwong, C.P.M., Assistant Commissioner, Royal Hong Kong Police Force.

=== Queen's Fire Service Medal (QFSM) ===
- Pang Tak-Sum, C.P.M., Chief Ambulance Officer, Hong Kong Fire Services.

=== Colonial Police and Fire Service Medal (CPM) ===
- Michael John Benson, Senior Superintendent, Royal Hong Kong Police Force.
- Chan Hung, Principal Ambulanceman, Hong Kong Fire Services.
- James Clements, Superintendent, Royal Hong Kong Police Force.
- Fong Hung-Kwan, Inspector, Royal Hong Kong Police Force.
- Leonard Briton Hill, Senior Superintendent, Royal Hong Kong Police Force.
- Ho Kit-pui, Principal Fireman, Hong Kong Fire Services.
- Donald Kee Yau-yin, Chief Inspector, Royal Hong Kong Police Force.
- William Henry Kirkhope, Chief Superintendent, Royal Hong Kong Police Force.
- Li Sing-kwong, Senior Divisional Officer, Hong Kong Fire Services.
- Arthur John Luke, Chief Inspector, Royal Hong Kong Police Force.
- John Richard Finch Mason, Senior Superintendent, Royal Hong Kong Police Force.
- Francis Murphy, Superintendent, Royal Hong Kong Police Force.
- Wayne Norris Maxwell Perinchief, Detective Superintendent, Bermuda Police Force.
- Angus John Delano Stevenson-Hamilton, Senior Superintendent, Royal Hong Kong Police Force.
- Tam She-sang, Principal Fireman, Hong Kong Fire Services.
- Richard John Tudor, Senior Superintendent, Royal Hong Kong Police Force.
- Gerald Vianney Lovell Willy-Furth, Superintendent, Royal Hong Kong Police Force.
- Yau Tong, Station Sergeant, Royal Hong Kong Police Force.
- Yeung Kwing, Superintendent, Royal Hong Kong Police Force.
- Yeung Kwok-fai, Station Sergeant, Royal Hong Kong Police Force.
- Yuen Yuk-kwan, Chief Inspector, Royal Hong Kong Police Force.

== Cook Islands ==
=== Order of the British Empire ===
==== Officer of the Order of the British Empire (OBE) ====
Civil Division

- Dr Pupuke Robati. For public services.

=== British Empire Medal (BEM) ===
Civil Division

- Tiki Tetava Ariki. For services to education and the community.
- Tutai Tutai teura JP. For services to the community.
- Michael Toki JP. For services to education.

== Mauritius ==
=== Knight Bachelor ===
- Maxime Edouard Lim Man Lim Fat. For services to industry.
- Indurduth Ramphul, Governor of the Bank of Mauritius.

=== Order of Saint Michael and Saint George ===
==== Companion of the Order of St Michael and St George (CMG) ====
- Paul Tobin Jones. For services to tourism.

=== Order of the British Empire ===
==== Commander of the Order of the British Empire (CBE) ====
Civil Division

- Lutchmiparsadsing Ramlagun. For services to commerce.
- Benjamin Claude Ricaud. For services to agriculture.

==== Officer of the Order of the British Empire (OBE) ====
Civil Division

- Muhmud Farouk Barahim. For services to commerce and to the community.
- Bissoon Bhogun. For services to the sugar industry.
- Premchun Mohith. For public service.
- Khodadeen Sumodhee. For public service.
- Yun Sing Tan. For services to the community.
- Hassam Teeluck. For services to industry.

==== Member of the Order of the British Empire (MBE) ====
Civil Division

- Catheerasa Caulee. For services to the community.
- Andre Regis Fanny. For services to the Co-operative movement.
- Balseck Gopal. For services to the community.
- Mehta Prayag. For services to the community.
- Bapnaidu Sokappadu. For services to the community.

=== Companion of the Imperial Service Order (ISO) ===
- Tayab Khodabocus. For public service.

=== Queen's Police Medal (CPM) ===
- Antoine Marie Therese Cyril Morvan, Assistant Commissioner of Police.
- Jean Harold Munso, Assistant Commissioner of Police.
- Jayeshwur Raj Dayal, Commanding Officer, Special Mobile Force.

=== Mauritius Police Medal (MPM) ===
- Narainsamy Kylassam Pillay, Superintendent of Police.
- Luc Pierney, Police Sergeant.
- Marie Francois Paul Antione, Police Constable.

== Bahamas ==
=== Order of the British Empire ===
==== Commander of the Order of the British Empire (CBE) ====
Civil Division

- The Reverend Dr. Charles Wellington Saunders. For services to the community.

==== Officer of the Order of the British Empire (OBE) ====
Civil Division

- Elizabeth Strachan. For public service.
- The Venerable William Edward Thompson. For services to the community.

== Grenada ==
=== Order of the British Empire ===
==== Commander of the Order of the British Empire (CBE) ====
Civil Division

- Arnold Morris Cruickshank. For public service.

==== Officer of the Order of the British Empire (OBE) ====
Civil Division

- Christopher Augustus Alonzo Williams. For services to the community.

==== Member of the Order of the British Empire (MBE) ====
Civil Division

- Jaij Margaret Celestine. For services to sport.
- Naaman Joseph Lewis. For services to agriculture.
- Patrice Agatha Robertson. For services to nursing and the community.

=== British Empire Medal (BEM) ===
Civil Division

- Samuel Patrice Olive. For services to fishing and agriculture.
- Miriam Alice Roden. For public service.

== Papua New Guinea ==
=== Knight Bachelor ===
- Ronald Dennis Buchanan, MBE. For services to civil aviation.
- Mekere Morauta. For services to banking and finance.

=== Order of Saint Michael and Saint George ===
==== Companion of the Order of St Michael and St George (CMG) ====
- The Honourable Mathew Bendumb, MP. For political services.
- The Honourable Brown Sinamoi, MP. For political services.

=== Order of the British Empire ===
==== Commander of the Order of the British Empire (CBE) ====
Civil Division

- Roger Keith Cunningham. For services to commerce and shipping.
- The Honourable Patterson Lowa, MP. For political services.
- Gerardus Johannus Antonius Lucas, MBE. For public service.

==== Officer of the Order of the British Empire (OBE) ====
Military Division

- Colonel Eric Rauki Ani (86009). For service to the Papua New Guinea Defence Force.

Civil Division

- The Honourable Pedi Larkin Arms, MPA. For public service.
- Christopher John Dooley. For services to banking.
- The Honourable Kaidama Elliott, MPA. For political services.
- John Desmond Fitzer, ISO. For public service.
- The Honourable Menu Hesingut, MP. For political services.
- Alan Keet. For services to commerce.
- The Honourable Arnold Marsipal, MP. For political services.
- Arthur Swinfield. For services to the community.
- The Right Reverend Wala Tamate. For services to the community.
- Thomas Tse. For services to the community.

==== Member of the Order of the British Empire (MBE) ====
Military Division

- Captain Mark Banasi (84378). For service to the Papua New Guinea Defence Force.

Civil Division

- Christian Arek. For services to the community.
- Goia Asimbi. For services to local government.
- Sean Christopher Dorney. For services to broadcasting and sport.
- Bruce Fisk. For services to the community.
- Senior Inspector Joseph Spencer Gawi. For services to the Royal Papua New Guinea Constabulary.
- Trevan Gordon Glough. For services to the community.
- Jessie Joseph. For services to Government House.
- Howard Lahari. For services to civil aviation.
- Alexis Indrajit Lovell. For services to banking.
- Paraka Nil, MPA. For services to local government.
- Senior Inspector David Tende. For services to the Royal Papua New Guinea Constabulary.
- John Towarait. For services to the community.
- Chief Inspector Julian Edward Twine. For services to the Royal Papua New Guinea Constabulary.

=== Companion of the Imperial Service Order (ISO) ===
- John Wagalia Malisa. For public service.
- Maimu Raka-Nou. For public service.

=== British Empire Medal (BEM) ===
Military Division

- Warrant Officer Robert Leck (83232). For service to the Papua New Guinea Defence Force.
- Sergeant Kon Tapaua (81875). For service to the Papua New Guinea Defence Force.

Civil Division

- Salesi Baira. For services to local government.
- Mesak Bubu. For services to the community.
- Mago Doilegu. For services to women and youth affairs.
- Sinsingal Dutikmosep. For public service.
- Gapi Molo. For services to the community.
- Senior Constable Dominic Orosoto. For services to the Royal Papua New Guinea Constabulary.
- Voretala Palo A. For public service.
- Constable Michael Taragau. For services to the Royal Papua New Guinea Constabulary.
- Mirupasi Wamea. For services to local government.

=== Queen's Police Medal (CPM) ===
- Chief Superintendent Bunu Katusele, Commander, Coastal Division, Royal Papua New Guinea Constabulary.
- Chief Superintendent John Toguata, Provincial Police Commander, East New Britain, Royal Papua New Guinea Constabulary.

== Solomon Islands ==
=== Order of the British Empire ===
==== Officer of the Order of the British Empire (OBE) ====
Civil Division

- Dennis Carlos Lulei. For public service.

==== Member of the Order of the British Empire (MBE) ====
Civil Division

- Lionel Oloni. For services to the community.

=== British Empire Medal (BEM) ===
Civil Division

- Pastor Sale Ofaidia. For services to the community.

== Tuvalu ==
=== Order of the British Empire ===
==== Officer of the Order of the British Empire (OBE) ====
Civil Division

- Dr. Falasene Salesa. For services to health and the community.

==== Member of the Order of the British Empire (MBE) ====
Civil Division

- Seluka Fred Resture. For services to education.
- Pulekai Sogivalu. For services to education.

== Saint Vincent and the Grenadines ==
=== Order of the British Empire ===
==== Commander of the Order of the British Empire (CBE) ====
Civil Division

- Alan Richard Gunn. For public service.

==== Officer of the Order of the British Empire (OBE) ====
Civil Division

- Randolph Toussaint, Commissioner of Police.

== Belize ==
=== Knight Bachelor ===
- George Noel Brown, Justice of the Supreme Court.

=== Order of the British Empire ===
==== Officer of the Order of the British Empire (OBE) ====
Civil Division

- Jose Marzurka Shoman. For services to commerce,

==== Member of the Order of the British Empire (MBE) ====
Civil Division

- Evadne Loretta Grant. For services to nursing and the community.
- John Clifford Paulino, Assistant Superintendent of Police.

== Antigua and Barbuda ==
=== Queen's Police Medal (CPM) ===
- Jocelyn Benta-Richards, Superintendent of Police.

== Saint Christopher and Nevis ==
=== Order of the British Empire ===
==== Commander of the Order of the British Empire (CBE) ====
Civil Division

- Ivan Charles Buchanan. For public service.

==== Officer of the Order of the British Empire (OBE) ====
Civil Division

- Colin David Pereira. For services to the hotel industry.

=== British Empire Medal (BEM) ===
Civil Division

- Vincent McDonald Prince. For services to the community.
