= Richard Peck (British Army officer) =

English cricketer and British Army officer

Major-General Richard Peck CB
- Born: 27 May 1937 (age 89); Rushden, Northamptonshire, England
- Military career
- Allegiance: United Kingdom
- Branch: British Army
- Service years: 1957–1997
- Rank: Major-General
- Units: Royal Engineers; Brigade of Gurkhas
- Conflicts: Gulf War
- Awards: Companion of the Order of the Bath

Richard Leslie Peck CB (born 27 May 1937) is a retired British Army officer and English first-class cricketer. Peck served mostly with the Royal Engineers in a military career that spanned from 1957 to 1997, rising to the rank of major-general. He also played two first-class cricket matches for the Combined Services cricket team.

== Military career ==
Peck was educated at Wellingborough School, before attending the Royal Military Academy Sandhurst. He graduated from Sandhurst in December 1957, whereupon he entered the Royal Engineers as a second lieutenant. In December 1959, he was promoted to the rank of lieutenant. Promotion to captain came in December 1963. He became a major in December 1969, with seniority antedated to June 1969. His promotion to lieutenant colonel followed in June 1974. He was promoted to the rank of colonel in December 1979, and to brigadier in December 1981, antedated to June 1981. Peck was appointed to the position of Chief in Engineer at the Ministry of Defence in January 1988, at which point he was also promoted to the substantive rank of major-general in February 1988, with seniority to January 1987. He was appointed as a companion to the Order of the Bath in the 1991 New Year Honours. In the lead up to military operations in the Gulf War, Peck was involved in terrain analysis. He relinquished the position of Chief in Engineer at the Ministry of Defence in August 1991. Though he retired from service in December 1991, he later served as colonel of the Brigade of Gurkhas, a position he had taken up in March 1993, until his tenure expired in April 1996, at which point he was replaced by major-general Anthony Pigott. His tenure as colonel commandant of the Royal Engineers expired in December 1997, a position he had held since October 1991, at which point he was succeeded by major-general John Drewienkiewicz. Following his retirement, Peck became a trustee of the Lord Kitchener Memorial Fund, which runs university scholarships for armed services members or their children.

== Cricket ==
Peck played two first-class cricket matches for the Combined Services cricket team, in 1960 against Surrey at The Oval, and in 1962 against Ireland at Belfast. He scored 24 runs across these two matches, as well as taking 2 wickets. These wickets came in the only over he bowled in first-class cricket, during the match against Ireland when he dismissed Stanley Bergin and Noel Ferguson for the cost of one run.

He later played minor counties cricket for Berkshire, making two appearances in the 1969 Minor Counties Championship and two further appearances in the 1971 Minor Counties Championship. His brother David also played cricket at first-class level.
