= William Utting =

British social worker and civil servant

Sir William Utting
- Born: 13 May 1931 (age 95); Great Yarmouth

Sir William "Bill" Utting (born 13 May 1931) is a British social worker and civil servant who served as the first Chief Inspector of Social Services from 1985 to 1991.

== Early life ==
William Benjamin Utting was born on 13 May 1931 in Great Yarmouth, Norfolk.

In 1950 and 1951 Utting undertook national service with the Royal Artillery at Oswestry and was later posted to the Rhine with the British Army.

== Professional life ==
=== Early career and local government (1956–1976) ===
Between 1956 and 1968, Utting worked within the probation services of County Durham and Norfolk and was later appointed as the Chief Officer of the Probation and After-Care Service for Newcastle upon Tyne.

In 1968, Utting spent two years as a Lecturer in Social Studies at the University of Newcastle upon Tyne. He returned to local government in 1970, serving as the Director of Social Services for the Royal Borough of Kensington and Chelsea until 1976.

=== Civil service and national oversight (1976–1991) ===
Utting transitioned to national policy in 1976, joining the Department of Health and Social Security (which later became the Department of Health). Between 1976 and 1985 Utting worked as the Chief Social Work Officer. In 1985 he became the inaugural Chief Inspector of the Social Services Inspectorate for England, a position he held until his retirement in July 1991.

=== Voluntary sector and public standards (1991–present) ===
In 1991, Utting was knighted for his services to social services.

Following his retirement, Utting chaired several organizations, including:

- The National Institute for Social Work
- The Council of Goldsmiths (University of London)
- The Joseph Rowntree Foundation and Housing Trust

In May 1991, the Secretary of State for Health, William Waldegrave, appointed Utting to chair a public inquiry into Britain's children's homes. The inquiry followed allegations of children being placed in solitary confinement, as a punishment, leading to suicide attempts. The report (Children in the Public Care: A Review of Residential Childcare) was published later the same year.

In June 1996 the Prime Minister, John Major, appointed Utting to chair a public inquiry into abuse in Britain's children's homes. The inquiry was ordered following reports of abuse in children's homes in North Wales and London. The report (People Like Us: Review of the Safeguards for Children Living Away from Home) was published in November 1997. The Secretary of State for Health, Frank Dobson MP, described the report as presenting "a woeful tale of failure at all levels to provide a secure and decent childhood for some of the most vulnerable children".

Between 1994 and 2002 Utting served as a member of the Committee on Standards in Public Life (the Nolan/Neill Committee), where he contributed to the oversight of ethical standards in British public office.

In January 2026, Utting become the first patron of the Social Work History Network. This position was conferred ‘in appreciation of his distinguished lifetime leadership of social work and commitment to the values of public service’.

== Archival collection ==
A collection of Utting’s professional records is held at the Modern Records Centre at the University of Warwick.

In 2006, Utting was interviewed as part of the British Library's 'National life stories: pioneers in charity and social welfare' collection.
