= Richardson Sheffield =

British knife brand

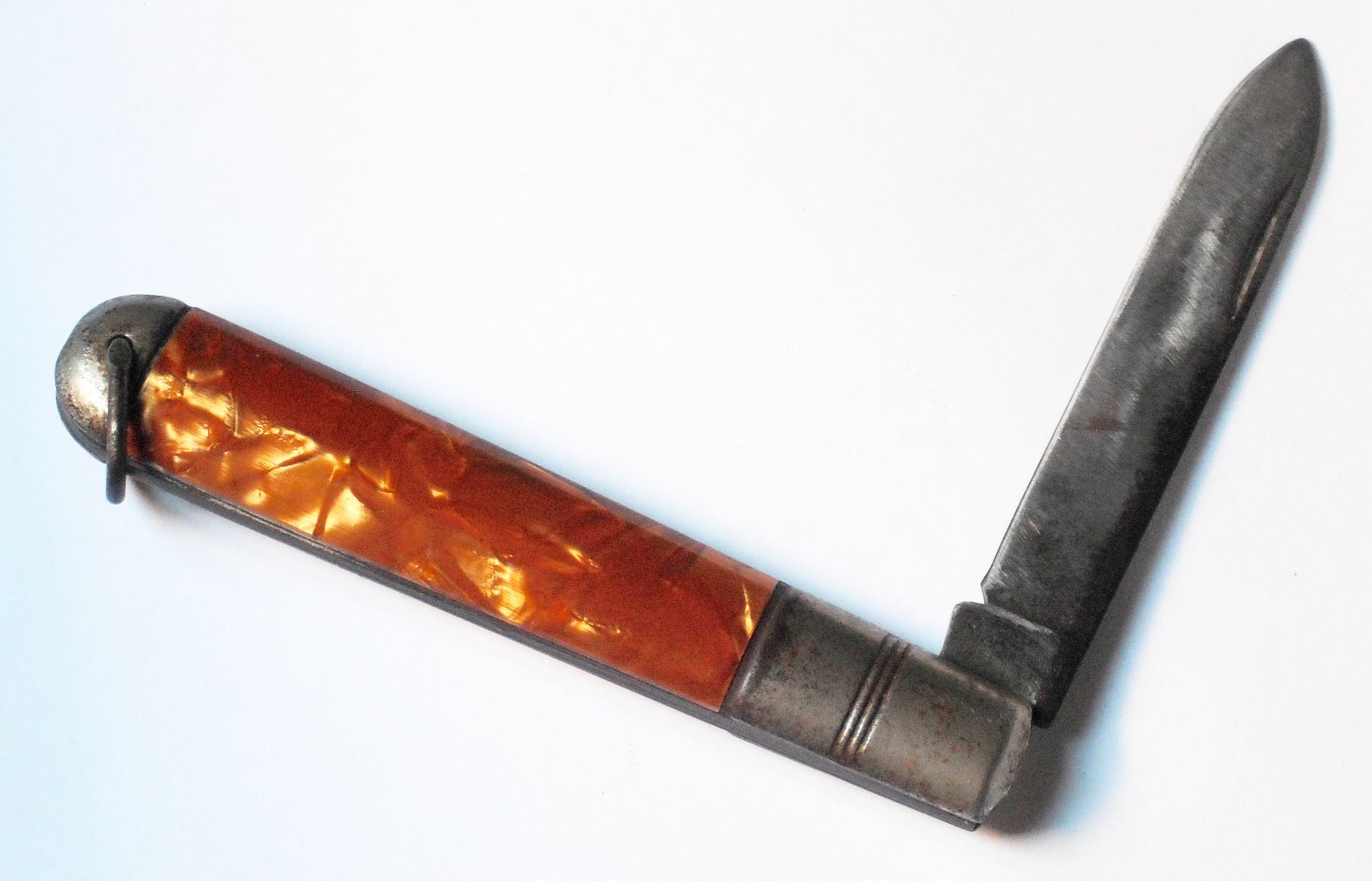
Pen knife made by Richardson in the 1970s

Richardson Sheffield is a major supplier of kitchen knives and scissors to the United Kingdom market. It is owned by the Dutch Amefa group.

Established in 1839, the company is headquartered in Sheffield and through many takeovers and successful marketing of its Laser brand in the 1980s became the number one knife brand in the UK.

Financial problems exacerbated by competition eventually led to collapse in 2007 and the brands were bought by Amefa. In common with the majority of Sheffield knifemakers, production has moved abroad. Whilst much design work remains in the city, many of the products are imported from the Far East except for the '1839' range which is produced in Sheffield. The company retains 'Sheffield' in its name.
