= SITPRO Limited =

Former UK trade-related public body

SITPRO Limited was a UK non-departmental public body that was constituted as a limited company and was focused on the removal of barriers to international trade through the simplification and harmonisation of trade procedures. Based in London, SITPRO was dedicated to encouraging and helping business trade more effectively and to simplifying the international trading process. It was closed as part of government cut-backs in September 2010.

SITPRO was an acronym, originally for the Simplification of International Trade Procedures Board and latterly for the Simpler Trade Procedures Board, set up in 1970 as the UK's trade facilitation agency. Reconstituted in April 2001 as a company limited by guarantee, it was a British non-departmental public body and the responsibility of the Department for Business, Innovation and Skills from which it received funding. The chairman (who at the time of its closure was Norman Rose) was appointed by the Secretary of State. Its other major stakeholder was HM Revenue and Customs.

== Role ==
SITPRO served the UK trading community as a whole. Its mission was to use its unique status to improve the competitive position of UK traders, and its work was guided by its board and advisory groups. These advisory groups brought together experts from government, industry, trade (both exporters and importers), transport, banking and financial services. At any one time, there were about 100 executives and specialists taking part, and its ability to obtain this voluntary support and guidance was essential for both its research and development and its promotional roles.

SITPRO also offered a wide range of services to businesses, including advice, briefings, publications and checklists covering various international trading practices. It managed the UK Aligned System of Export Documents, and licensed the printers and software suppliers who sell the forms and export document software. The series contains nearly seventy standard commercial, transport, banking, insurance and official forms.

SITPRO was involved with a wide variety of trade facilitation activities including:

- Work towards a trade facilitation agreement through the World Trade Organization
- Development of the UNeDocs electronic messaging standards at UN/CEFACT and the UK national implementation UNeDocsUK
- Development of policy on supply chain security
- Development of the UK's International Trade Single Window

In July 2010, it was announced that SITPRO would close within the next year, with responsibilities being assumed by the Department for Business, Innovation and Skills and the organisation ceased operations in September 2010.
