= Wichard Joachim Heinrich von Möllendorf =

Prussian field marshal

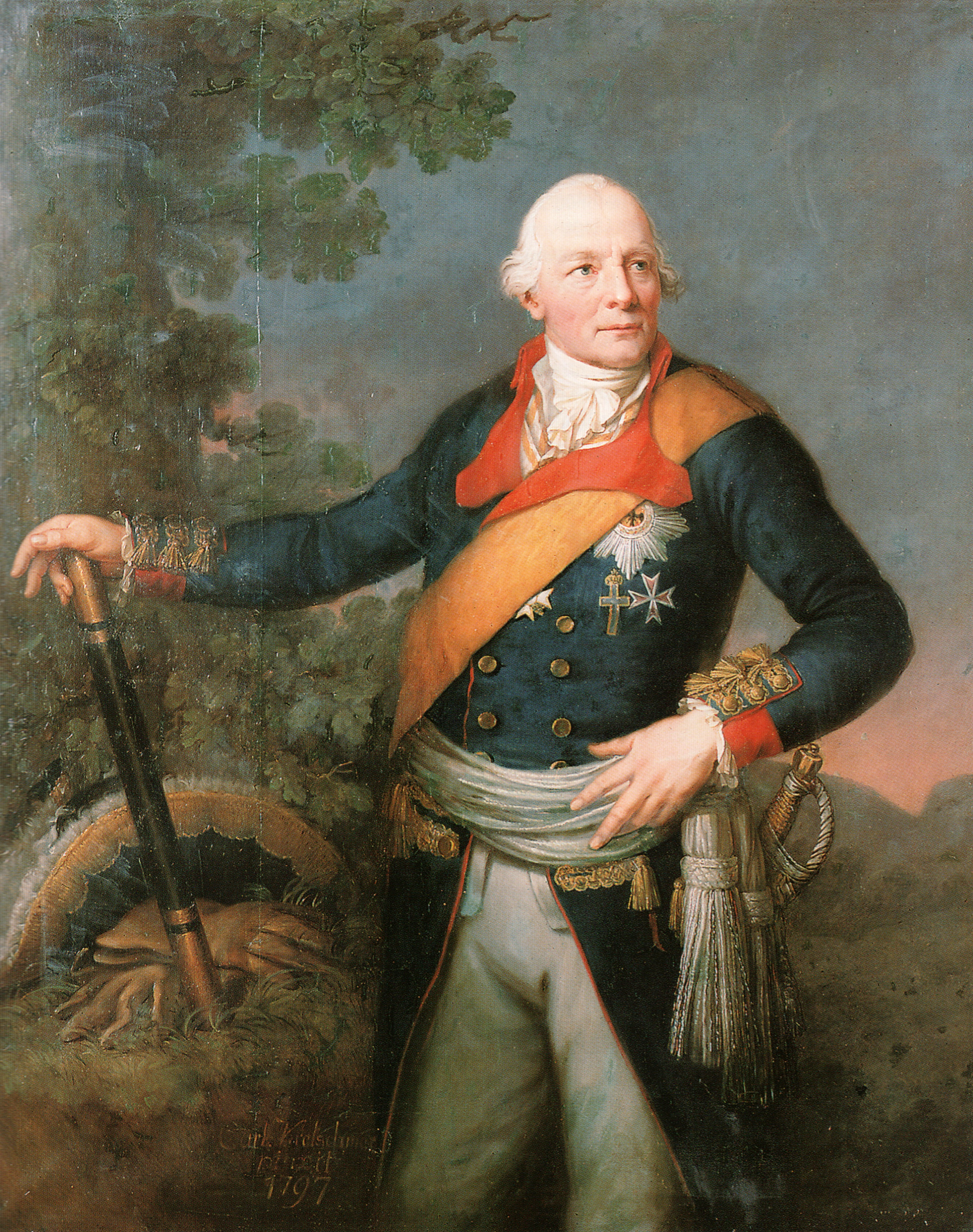
Wichard Joachim Heinrich von Möllendorf.

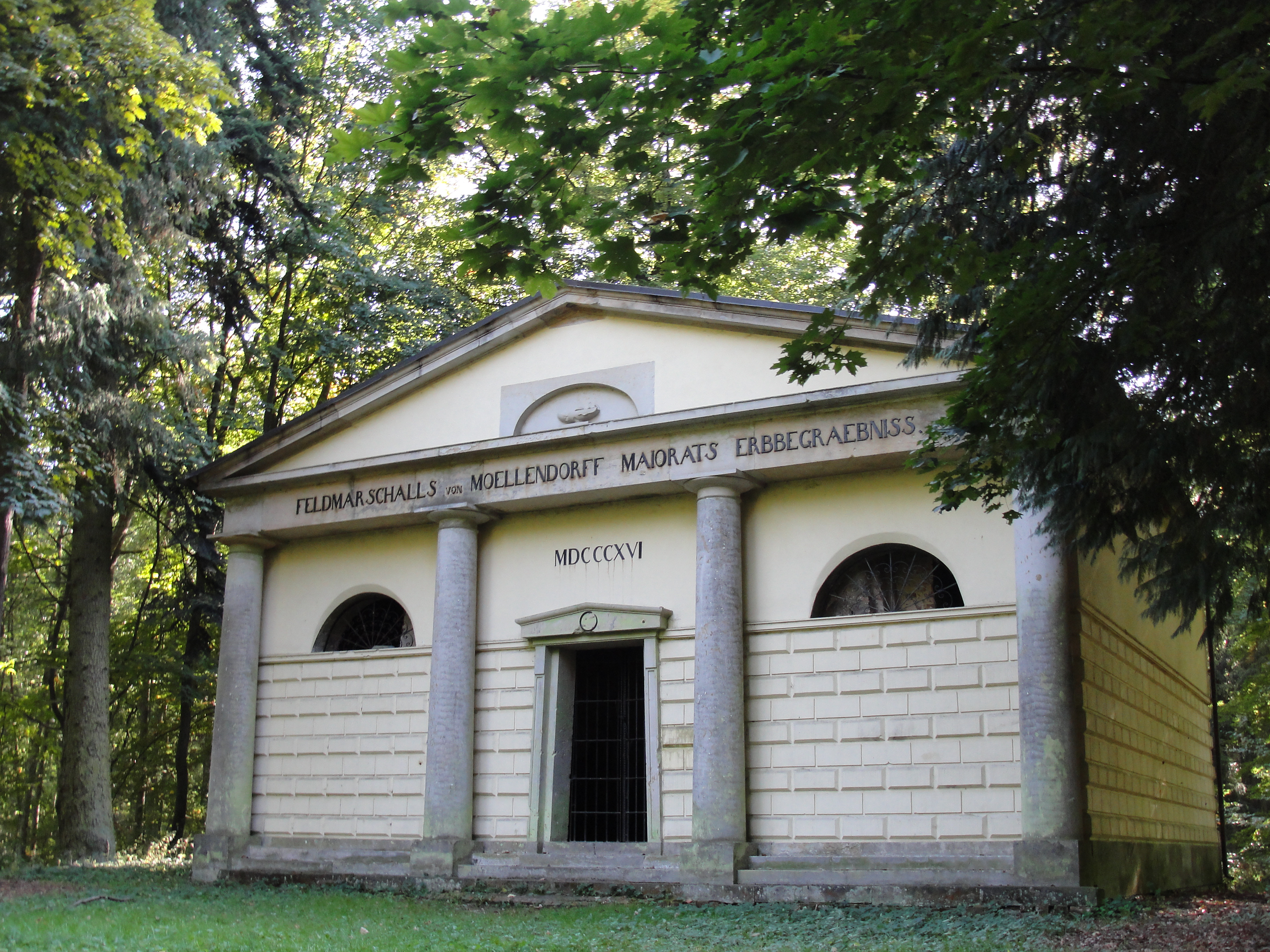
Hereditary burial of Field Marshal Möllendorff (architect Salomo Sachs 1816)

Wichard Joachim Heinrich von Möllendorf (7 January 1724 – 28 January 1816) was a Generalfeldmarschall of the Kingdom of Prussia.

== Life and career ==
Möllendorf was born in Lindenberg (Prignitz), now a part of Wittenberge, in the Margraviate of Brandenburg. He began his career as a page of King Frederick the Great in 1740. The outbreak of the Silesian Wars gave him his first opportunity of seeing active service, and the end of the second war saw him a captain, promoted for bravery at Soor (1745).

In the Seven Years' War, his brilliant conduct at the churchyard of Leuthen and at Hochkirch won him promotion to major. In 1760, in the almost lost Battle of Torgau, Möllendorf was captured by the Austrians, but released in 1761, and was made major general later in the year. He received an Order of Merit for his exertions. At the Battle of Burkersdorf Möllendorf commanded a brigade that participated in the successful assault of the fortified Austrian positions.

Seventeen years later, as lieutenant-general, he won at Brix one of the few successes of the War of the Bavarian Succession (or Potato War). In the years of peace Möllendorf occupied considerable posts, being made governor of Berlin in 1783. Promoted to general of the infantry in 1787, and general field marshal in 1793, that year he commanded the troops which put into effect the second partition of Poland. He commanded the Prussian army on the Rhine in 1794.

In the disastrous Battle of Jena-Auerstedt (1806) Möllendorf played a considerable part, though he did not actually command a corps. He was present with King Frederick William III at Auerstedt. He was wounded, and fell into the hands of the French, in the debacle which followed. After releasing him, Napoleon awarded him the cross of the Legion of Honor.

Wichard von Möllendorff lived the remainder of his life in retirement. He died in Havelberg at the age of 92 on 28 January 1816, his final resting place being a mausoleum in the Gadow Castle Park (at Lanz, Brandenburg), built in 1816 according to plans by the architect Salomo Sachs.
