= Salomo Sachs =

Jewish Prussian architect, astronomer, building official (1772–1855)

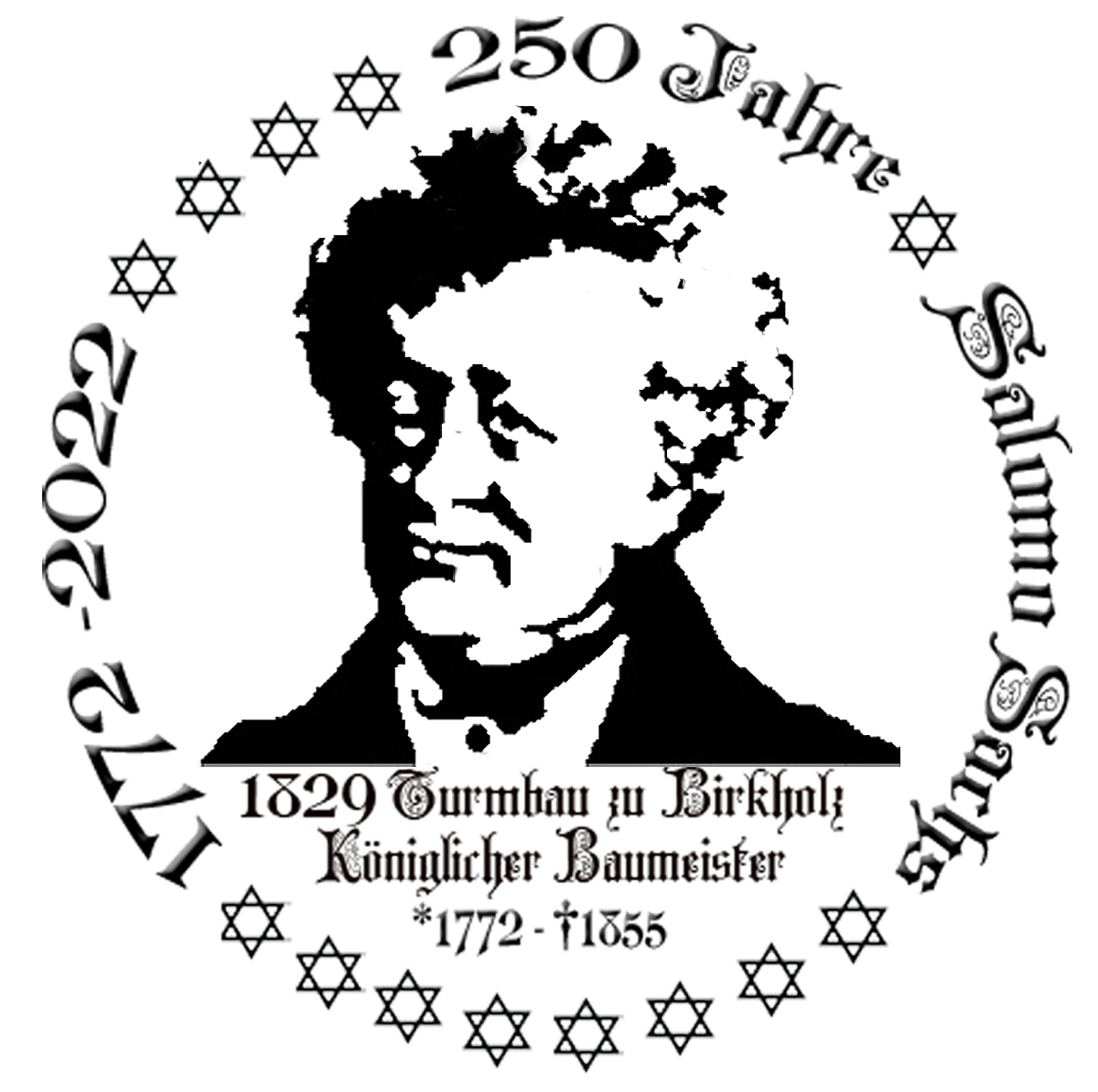
- Born: 22 December 1772; Berlin, Germany
- Died: 14 May 1855 (aged 82); Berlin, Germany
- Spouse: Henriette Isser

Signature
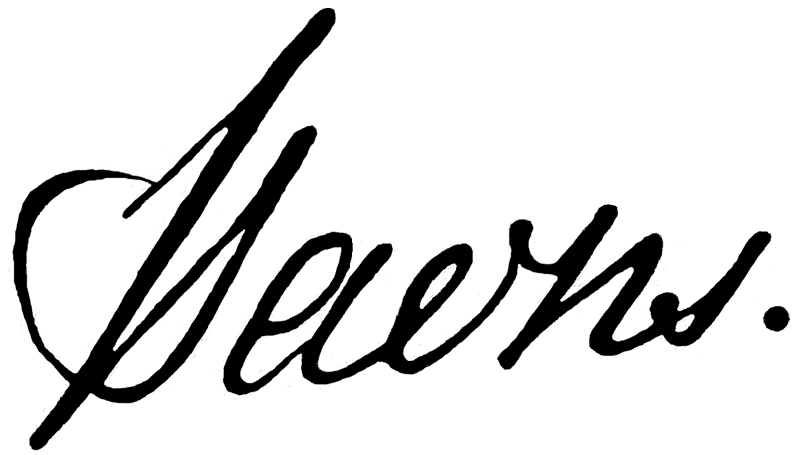

Salomo Sachs (Hebrew: זקס שְׁלֹמֹה, romanized: Šəlomoh Sachs; born on 22 December 1772 in Berlin; died on 14 May 1855) was a Jewish Prussian architect, astronomer, Prussian building official, mathematician, drawing teacher for architecture, teacher for machine drawings, building economist, writer, author of non-fiction and textbooks and universal scholar. He attained the rank of a royal building inspector and with his cousin Major Meno Burg they were the only men in the Prussian civil service who had not renounced their Jewish faith.

Sachs was born in Berlin on 22 December 1772, the son of Lottery collector and Protected Jew Joel Jacob Sachs (born 30 July 1738 in Berlin; died 18 April 1820 in Berlin) and his second wife Esther Sachs (c. 1746 – 1813). His father was head of the association Bedek Habajith of the Jewish community of Berlin ("The Damage to the House"; "Maintenance of the Building", here "Building Maintenance") (Hebrew: תחזוקת הבניין)

== Education and qualification ==
At the age of 18 he studied architecture and drawing from 1790 to 1792 at the Royal Academy of Arts in Berlin. On 9 December 1792 he was sworn in as pupil at the Oberhofbauamt in Berlin. His teacher and superior in service was the Royal Oberhofbaurat and Geheime Kriegsrat Friedrich Becherer.

I was sworn at the same time on the basis of my trial work with the Government and Building Councilor Mandel. He, the Christian, and I, the Jew, jointly took our oath of office into the hands of the legal adviser from the Upper building authority Mr. Troschel. At the same time we pronounced one and the same oath together, but with different closing formula. With regard to my, there was no mention of any Jewish scholar, of any Jewish witness, of any washing of hands, putting on the prayer robe etc., nor of any synagogue.

— Salomo Sachs (a translation)

At this time ruled Frederick William II. On 1 July 1794 Sachs obtained a patent as Ober-Hof-Bau-Conducteur and on 26 September 1799 he was appointed Ober-Hof-Bau-Inspector at the Oberhofbauamt. During his training, Dr. Johann Albert Eytelwein was also one of his teachers, to whom he dedicated his work Complete instruction in the manufacture of building hardware in 1827. As building inspector he took over the leadership of the building police in his department and the chairmanship of the examination commission of the master builders. Between 1790 and 1796, it was planned to use the land in the Molkenmarkt 1 area for the construction of the new city bailiwick. Projects were designed by members of the Oberhofbauamt and construction began in 1791 under the direction of Paul Ludwig Simon and Friedrich Gilly. Solomo Sachs had, not officially requested, designed two facades for this. These were the facades of the portal and the front on the Spree side, which the authority accepted very favourably, and for which he received his first public recognition. Since 1786 the Academy of Arts and Mechanical Science published the catalogue for the annual Academy exhibition. In the following years the biennial rhythm was introduced. The aim was to distinguish the Berlin public from the other academies in Kassel and Dresden. In the years 1786 to 1816, mainly architectural models and designs based on antique models took up space. A large proportion of the entries were submitted by academy students and younger Conducteuren. In 1794, Johann Carl Gottlieb Schlaetzer, Salomo Sachs, August Ferdinand Mandel (1771–1846), Johann Georg Moser and Paul Ludwig Simon were able to contribute their designs for churches, prisons, a playhouse, hunting lodge, country houses and town houses, summer houses and mortuaries to the exhibition and catalogue. In 1798 Sachs designed a mortuary for the Society of Friends (Gesellschaft der Freunde), but for financial reasons it was never executed. From 1799 to 1806 he taught as a drawing teacher for architecture and a teacher for machine drawings at the Bauakademie, which was newly founded by King Frederick William III. on 6 July 1799.

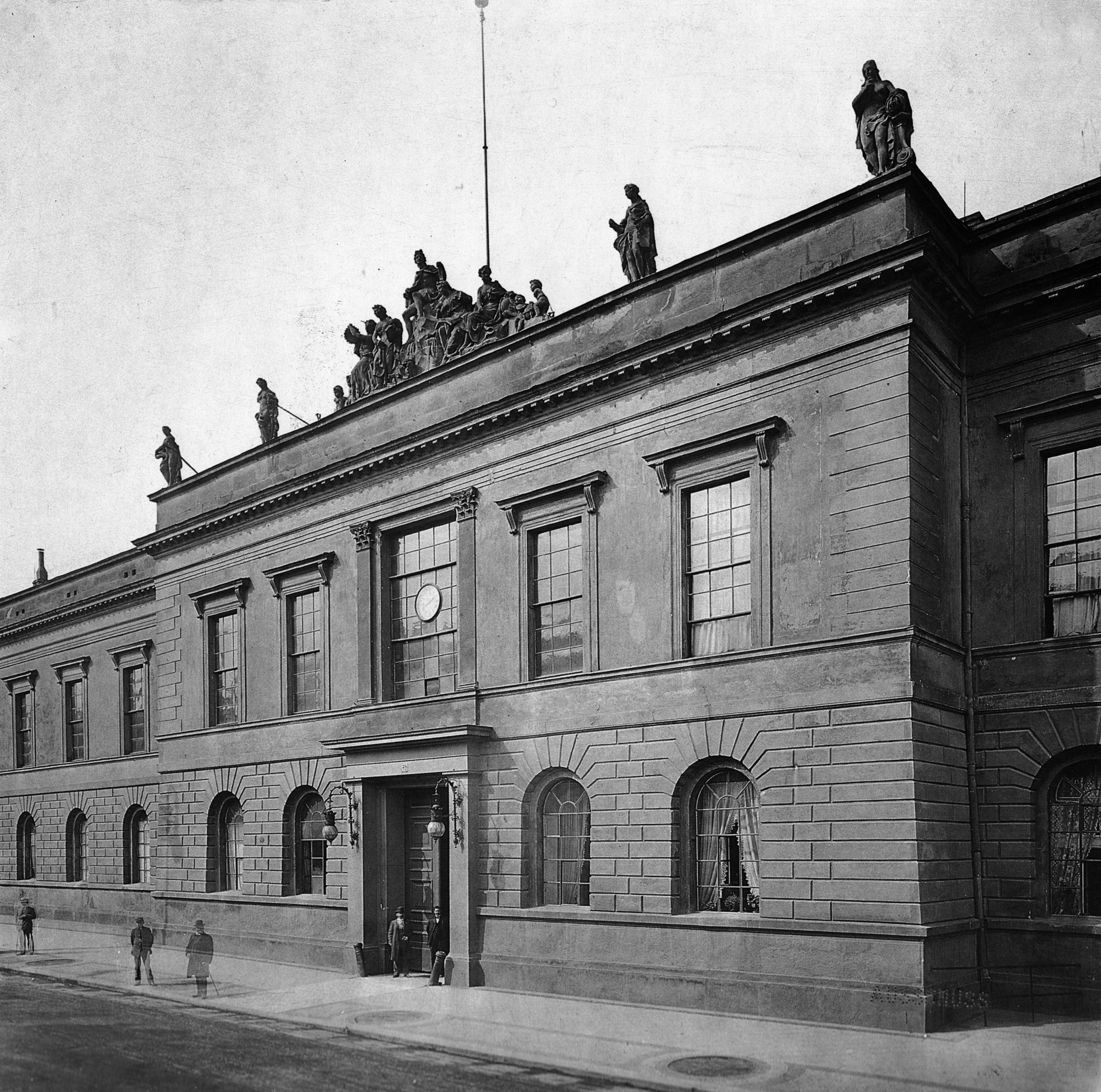
1790–1809 Königliche Akademie der bild. Künste und mech. Wissenschaften

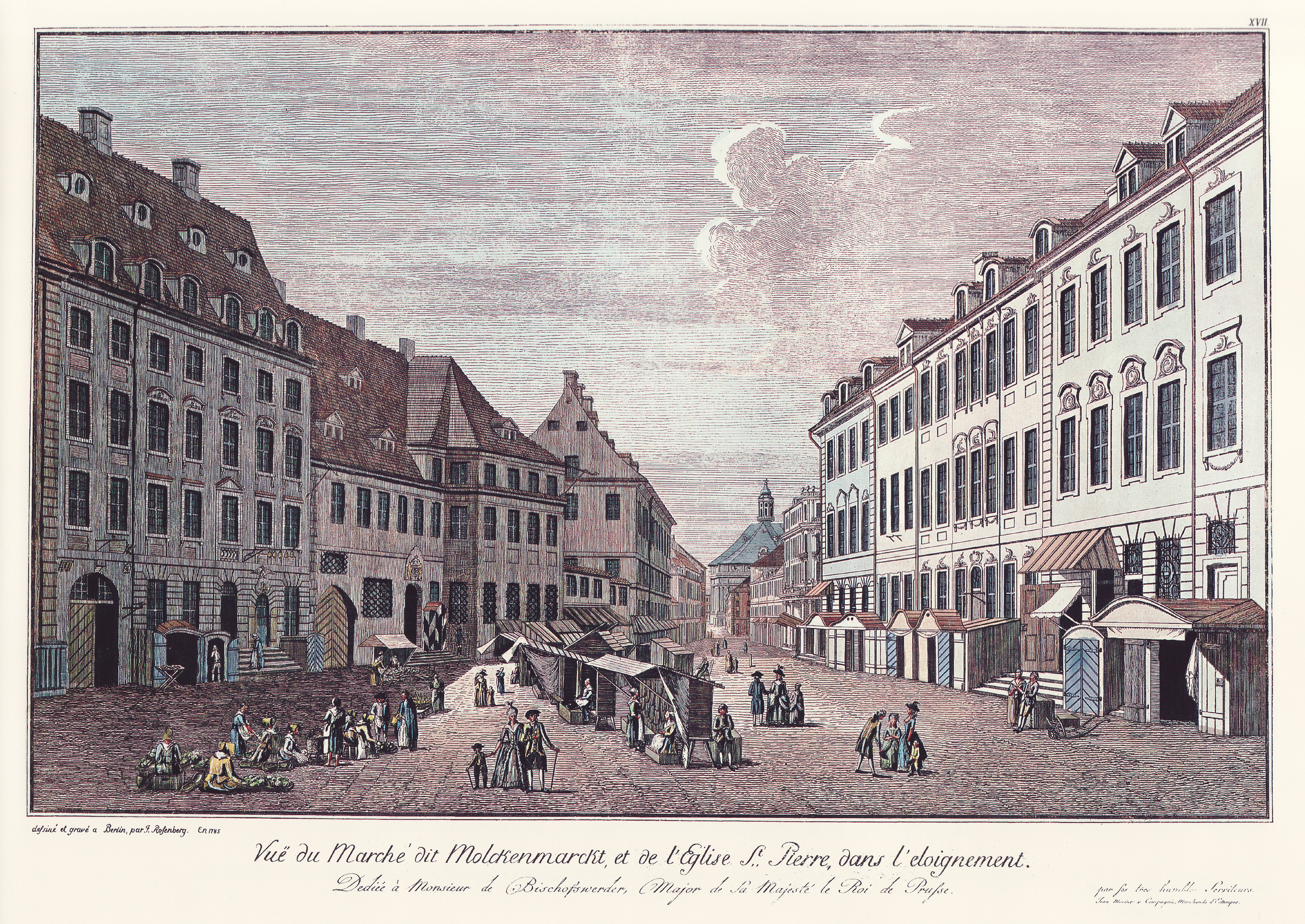
Molkenmarkt um 1780

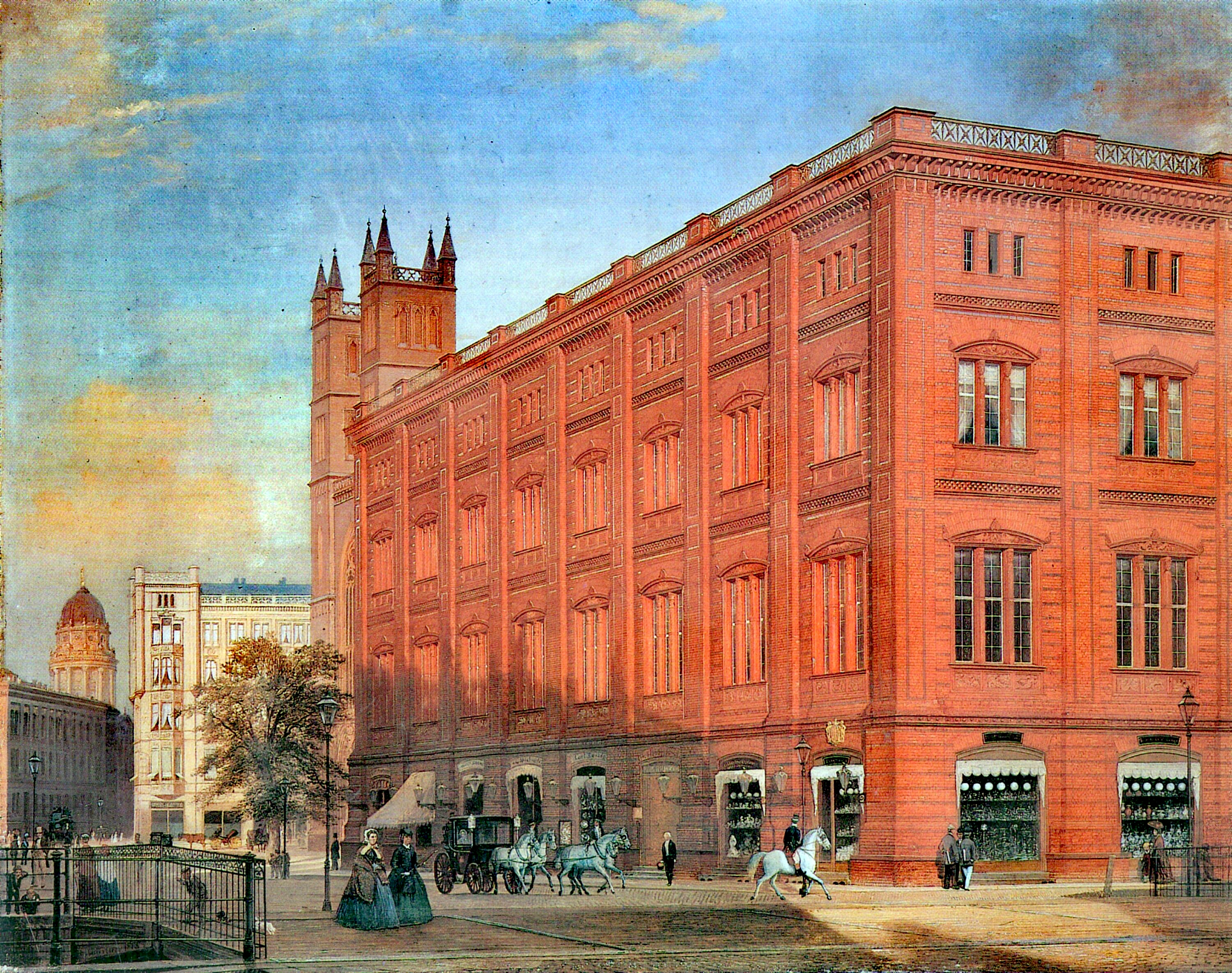
Berliner Bauakademie

== Family and siblings ==
On 21 September 1802 he married Henriette Isser from Hamburg in Berlin. The marriage produced a son. His son Albert Sachs (* 29 August 1803 in Berlin, † 11 November 1835 ibid.) became a doctor.
His uncle was Jüdel Sachs (born 10 April 1752 in Berlin; died 17 May 1819 ibid.), who was a gardener by profession and made a name for himself as a pioneer of career changes. (To provide new career prospects for Jews who were no longer allowed to work in the professions they had previously practised or who had little or no chance of advancement.)
Salomo Sachs had the following siblings

- Israel Joel Sachs (born 25 March 1762 in Berlin; died 26 August 1848 in Berlin). He was a pawnbroker by profession and lived in Eyergasse 2. Civil rights 1809 on the basis of the city ordinance of 19 November 1808
- Hirsch Joel Sachs (born 18 October 1770 in Berlin; died 22 September 1824 in Berlin) was a gardener and owner. He lived at Am Grünen Weg 2 Civil rights on 9 August 1813
- Veile (Veilchen; Feilchen; Fanny) Sachs (born 4 November 1778 in Berlin; died c. 1858) married Daniel Alexander Benda (Daniel David Alexander Benda) Berlin publicist and city councilor (born 22 April 1786; died 6 January 1870) on 13 February 1809. Veile was honorary mother of the orphan education institute of the Jewish community of Berlin, founded by Baruch Auerbach. The following children were born from the marriage, Salomo Sachs' nieces
  - Clara (1810–1818)
  - Esther (16 October 1813 - 1877)
  - Nephew Anton Ferdinand Benda. (born 10 February 1817 in Berlin; died 6 January 1893 in Lübeck) Both converted later to Christianity, Esther Benda (later she called herself Eda (Edda) Anna) still received the baptism by Friedrich Schleiermacher.
- Jacob Joel Sachs was born in Berlin on 13 September 1781. He was a craftsman, and on 16 March 1810 he was granted a concession to manufacture goods with silver plating. Resident in Berlin Münzstraße 24. civil rights on 12 March 1812. Solomo's daughter-in-law was Süsche Kinschberg (born 24 June 1792 Berlin; died 24 November 1843 in Berlin) who married Jacob Joel on 11 June 1812. Around 1831 Jacob became an inspector of the Jewish hospital. Joel Jacob Sachs died in Berlin on 20 December 1847.

Jewish couples, but also Veile and Alexander Benda as well as Süßsche and Jacob Joel, had to file applications for marriage licenses, in some cases also for marriage certificates and, after marriage, for the children's rights of residence.

== New Guardhouse (Neue Wache) and the outbreak of war ==
In 1806, shortly before the outbreak of the French war, the Collegium of the Bauakademie was commissioned by the highest authority to draw up and submit plans for the reconstruction of the Opera Bridge with a guardhouse nearby and the construction of a massive dog bridge (castle bridge). Here, the older and higher-ranking officials of the Collegium were in demand, for example Johann Heinrich Gentz. As a young civil servant, Solomo Sachs was so fascinated by this task that he worked out his own drawings, ideas and drafts in complete silence. He submitted them to his teacher, the privy councillor Becherer, who submitted the drawings for examination. Against all the specialists' magnificent drawings, his designs for the Palace Bridge and the New Guardhouse won the prize. The outbreak of war delayed the plans.

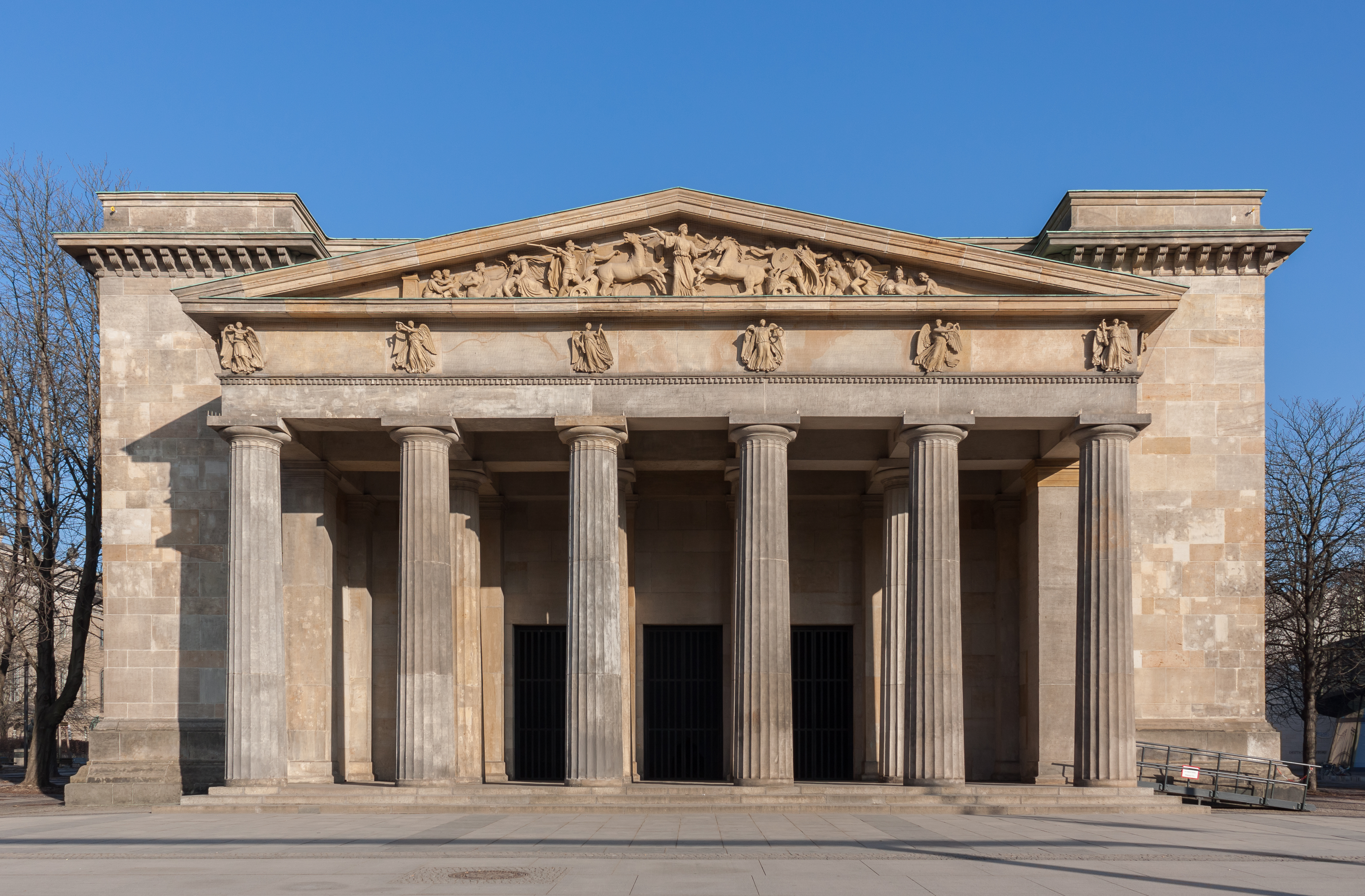
View of the Neue Wache from the street Unter den Linden. Architects Salomo Sachs (architectural design 1806) and Karl Friedrich Schinkel (Adapted design and execution 1816)

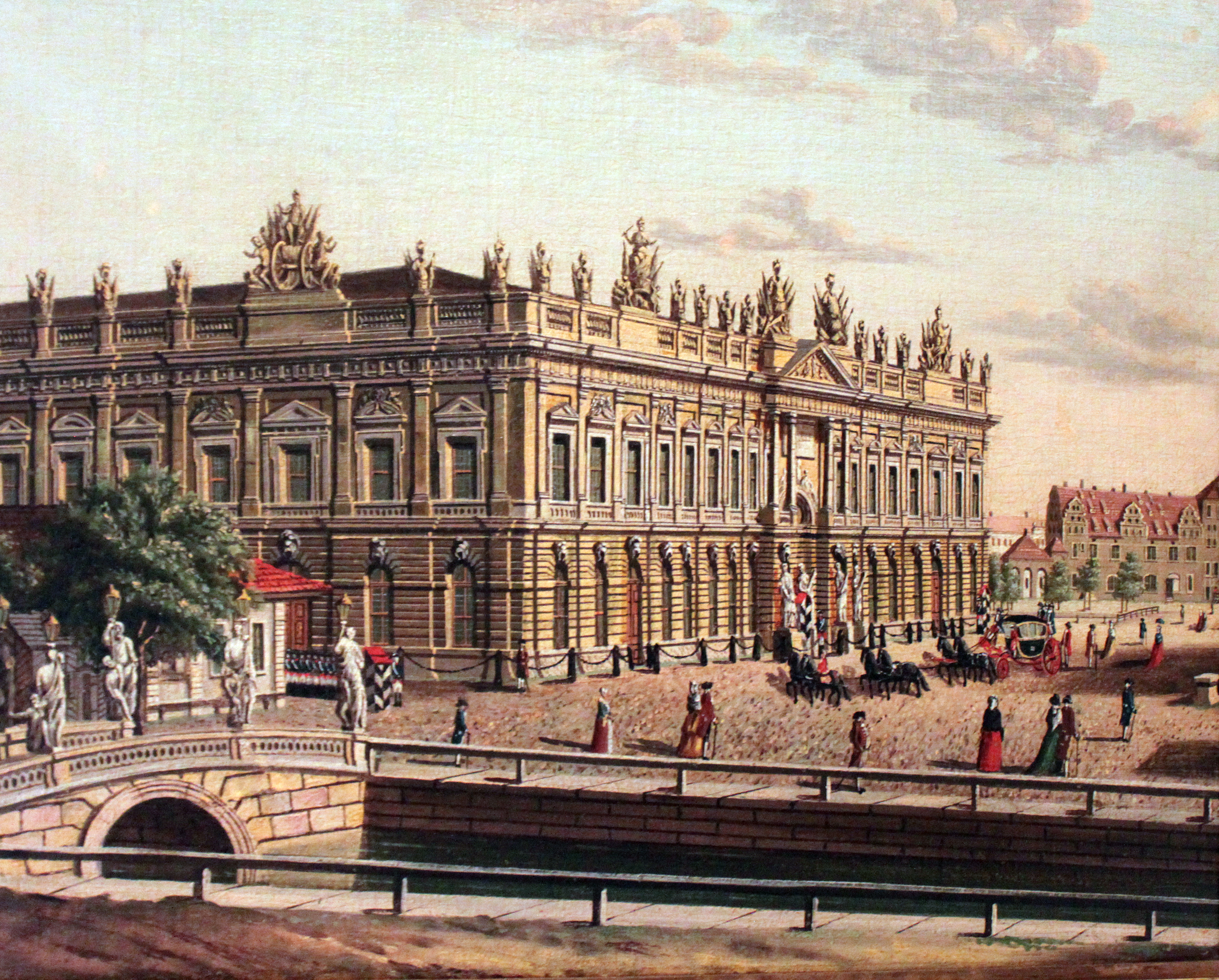
Painting by Carl Traugott Fechhelm, 1785: Armoury, in front the old opera bridge

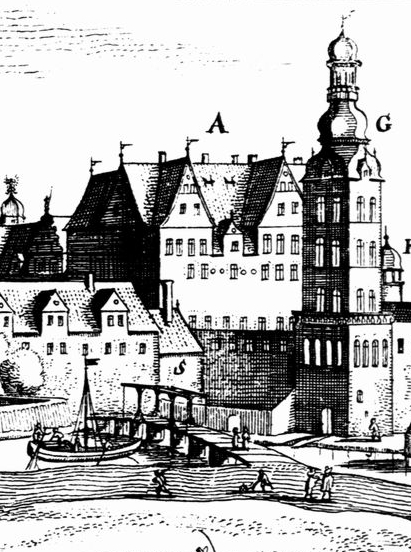
Dog bridge (castle bridge) on an engraving by Matthäus Merian, 1652

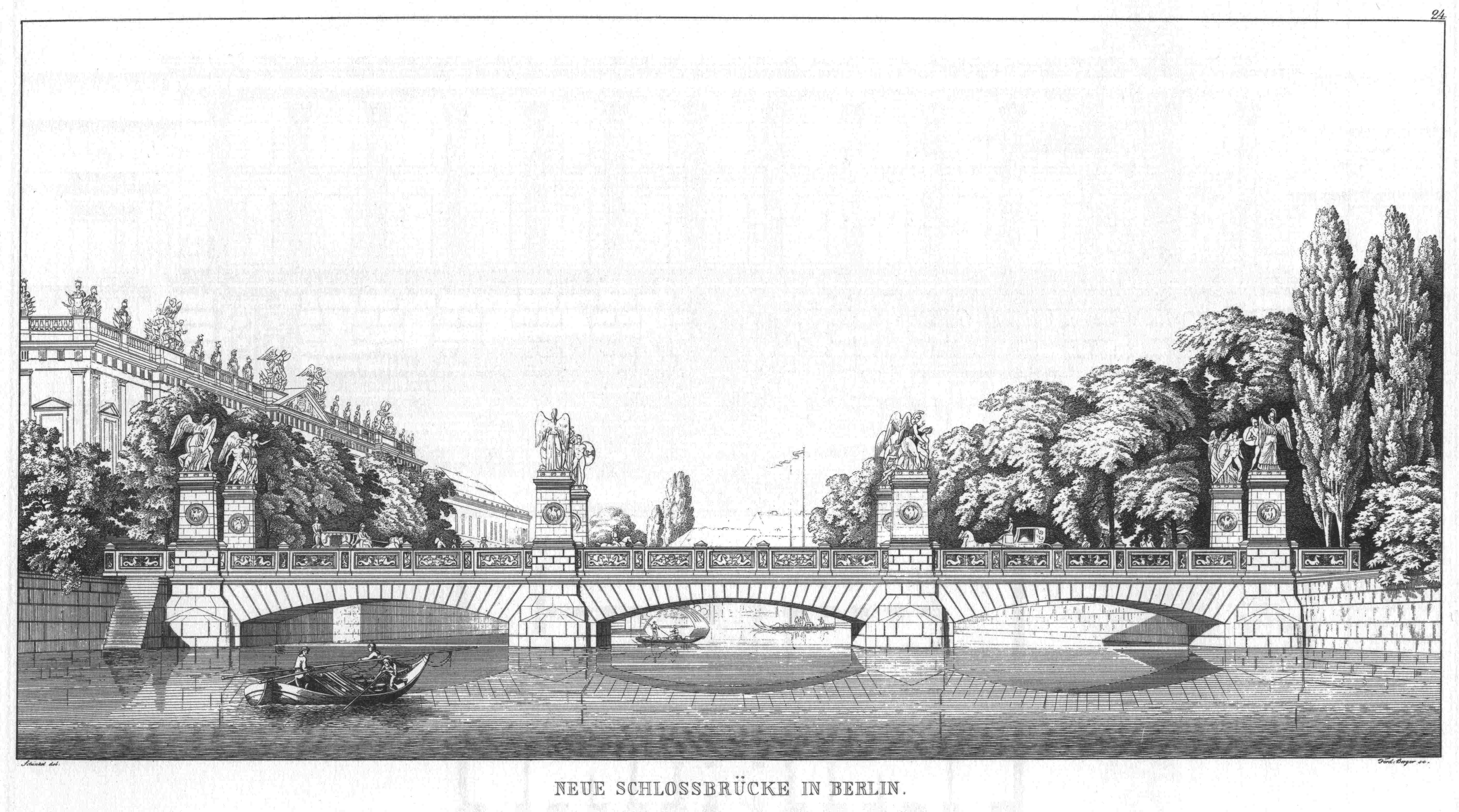
Castle bridge on a drawing by Karl Friedrich Schinkel from the Collection of Architectural designs

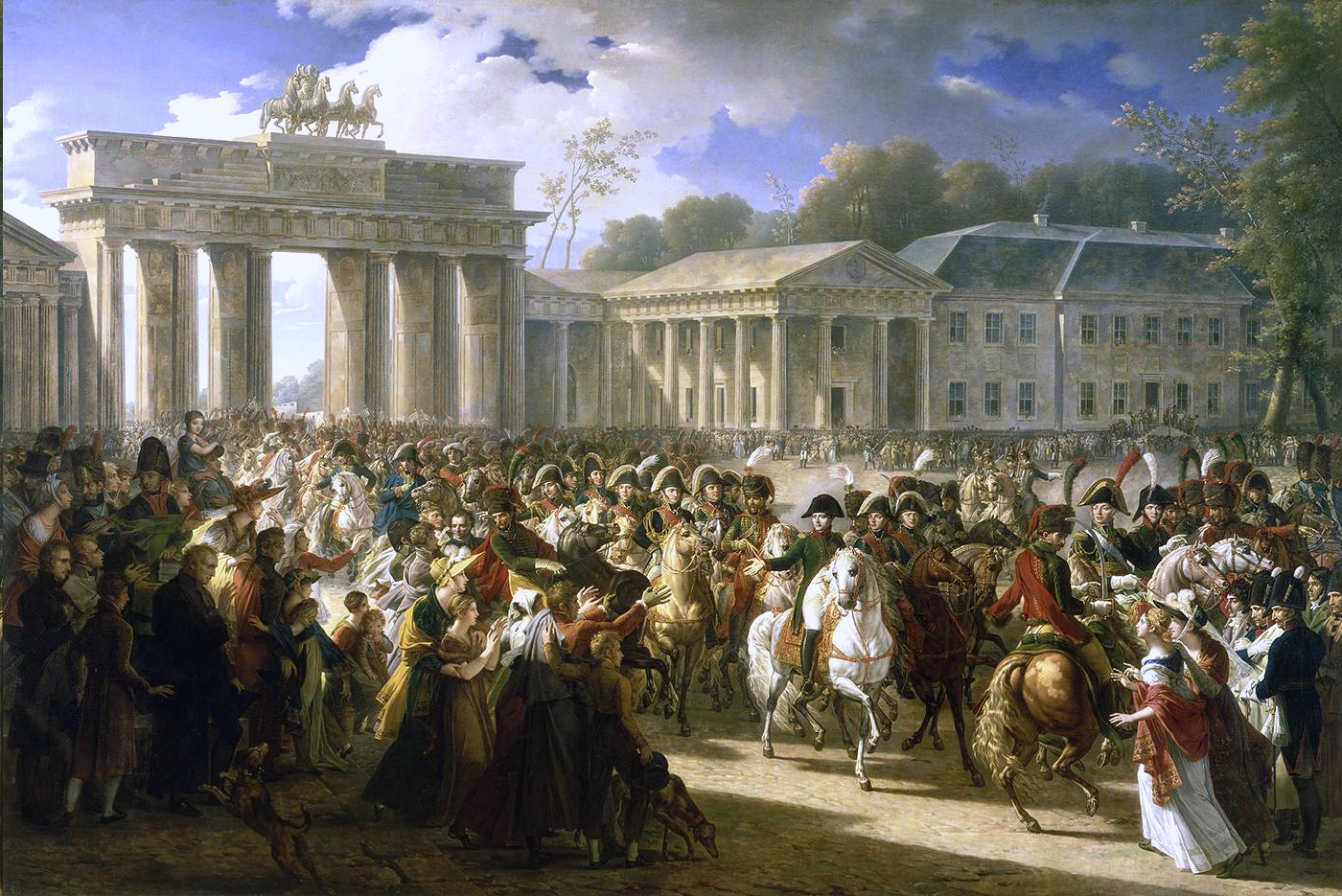
Charles Meynier – 1806 Napoleon in Berlin

== The Coalition Wars and the War of Liberation 1813–1815 and the search for new intentions ==
After the lost war, the financing of the Bauakademie and the Oberhofbauamt fell victim to the state austerity measures in favour of contributions to France and Sachs lost his job. He received waiting pay from the government from 1808 to 1816.

Only after the end of the war was the plan resumed by Friedrich Schinkel, but now it was implemented with its adaptations. It was not until 1842 that Sachs noted in his autobiography that the new guardhouse in particular resembled his basic designs, with the exception of Schinkel's masterly decoration of the building.

"Here I cannot fail to point out how the basic features of the building complex up to the new guardhouse, as it stands there now, correspond to mine. At first I had put this building on aligned, not with the armoury but with the university. The peculiarity of my construction was that the façade was actually formed by the rear front (high wall), in that the roof was to have its waste only towards the rear. In addition, two short side wings, connected by a Blinding-Masonry at the back and enclosing a small courtyard, were placed in such a way that the whole was a closed square. Finally, the façade was decorated with 6 Doric columns and two pavilions on each side. I hope that nobody will take offence at the comparison I am making here between Schinkel's design and my earlier project of one and the same building, because I am not talking about Schinkel's elaborate decoration of the building, but only about the adaptation of the execution and the construction"

— Salomo Sachs from his autobiography 1842

=== The flying cataster and the municipal tax ===
In 1812, Sachs wrote the first complete Allgemeine Straßen und Wohnungs-Anzeiger for the royal capital of Berlin. It was a groundbreaking work for future address books as well, and this masterpiece even found buyers abroad. The king ordered 4 copies and the State Chancellor Karl August Prince von Hardenberg ordered 12 copies. The police stations also ordered, as the map plans and addresses were very accurate. Unfortunately the beginning of the second French war prevented him from making a good financial living. However, the address book opened up another possibility, since the Privy Councillor Friedrich August von Staegemann, chairman of the finance party, was currently working on the organisation of the property tax, the idea of a flying cataster was born. Sachs opened an office to deal with this task, in order to gain control of the taxpayers with the least personnel. Berlin was thereby divided into 12 tax districts, with each district receiving information on changes in the residence of its citizens every day by means of a form and updated hourly. This is also how the first residents' registration offices came into being and police-relevant parts of the flying cadastre were set up and used at every police station in Berlin's residential city. The Privy Oberfinanzrat von Staegemann commissioned Sachs to make proposals to provide the state with income of several million talers through a suitable tax. His proposal led to the municipal tax that is still in force today and was first implemented as a Mieth tax.

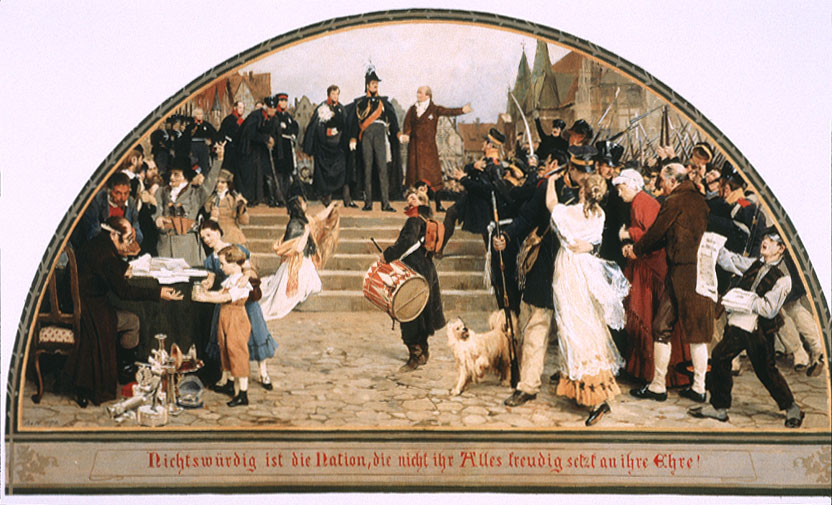
Die nationale Erhebung 1813 (1870, Anton von Werner)

=== The Accommodation authority ===
In 1813 the accommodation authority had to be reorganized, as Russian troops passing through had to be accommodated and fed by tenants and house owners. This represented an unbearable burden of war and many complaints were made about the state's ruthless distribution practices. On 15 March 1813, at the highest cabinet order of King Friedrich Wilhelm III, who was in Breslau, Silesia at the time, the entire Prussian territory between the Elbe and the Russian border was divided into four military governorates (1813–1815) for military strategic reasons of waging war against France. At the same time, the Oberregierungskommission in Berlin, which had been founded on 20 January 1813, was dissolved, as was the General Commission for Accommodation, Food and marching affairs (German General Kommission für das Einquartierung, Verpflegung und Marschwesen), which had been created on 24 April 1812.
The royal order to Berlin to establish the 1st Military Governorate between the Elbe and Oder rivers was given to Military Governor Lieutenant General Anton Wilhelm von L'Estocq and Civil Governor and Privy State Councillor Dr. Johann August Sack. They were to find suitable measures and solutions for the troops passing through and their quartering. This important authority entrusted Sachs with this task. He was assigned staff and assigned a room in the Kölln town hall, which he set up as an account office. There he and his colleagues were the contact persons for inquiries, complaints, claims and the development of a fair system of accommodation for the citizens.
In March 1813, the orders of magnitude to be handled amounted to 13300 soldiers and 4000 horses of the Russian military and 8100 soldiers and 1000 horses of the Prussian army every day. In July the maximum number of Prussian soldiers, 2000 prisoners and 5500 sick people reached 18000. Solomon had found the ingenious solution with a voucher system (paper money) that would be paid out at the end of the war. Everyone who reported within 24 hours of being billeted and handed in his billet for the quarter received these vouchers. This fair system could thus be installed, and Sachs and his many employees solved this task to everyone's satisfaction.

== Struggling for reinstatement into the Prussian civil service ==
On the basis of a specially-prepared expert opinion of 23 September 1815, for the Jewish community of Berlin, following damage caused by moisture to the dome of the Old Synagogue, Sachs had produced architectural drawings.
On 7 April 1816, Sachs asked the king for his reinstatement. This request was rejected on the basis of Prussian Jewish Edict §9 of 1812. However, his second petition, dated 24 April 1816, led to success through the king, who allowed the exception to the rule, and through the announcement of the supreme cabinet order of 29 April 1816, by Cabinet Counsel Albrecht. At this time, Sachs lived at 49 Markgrafenstrasse and was a neighbor of Abraham Mendelssohn Bartholdy.

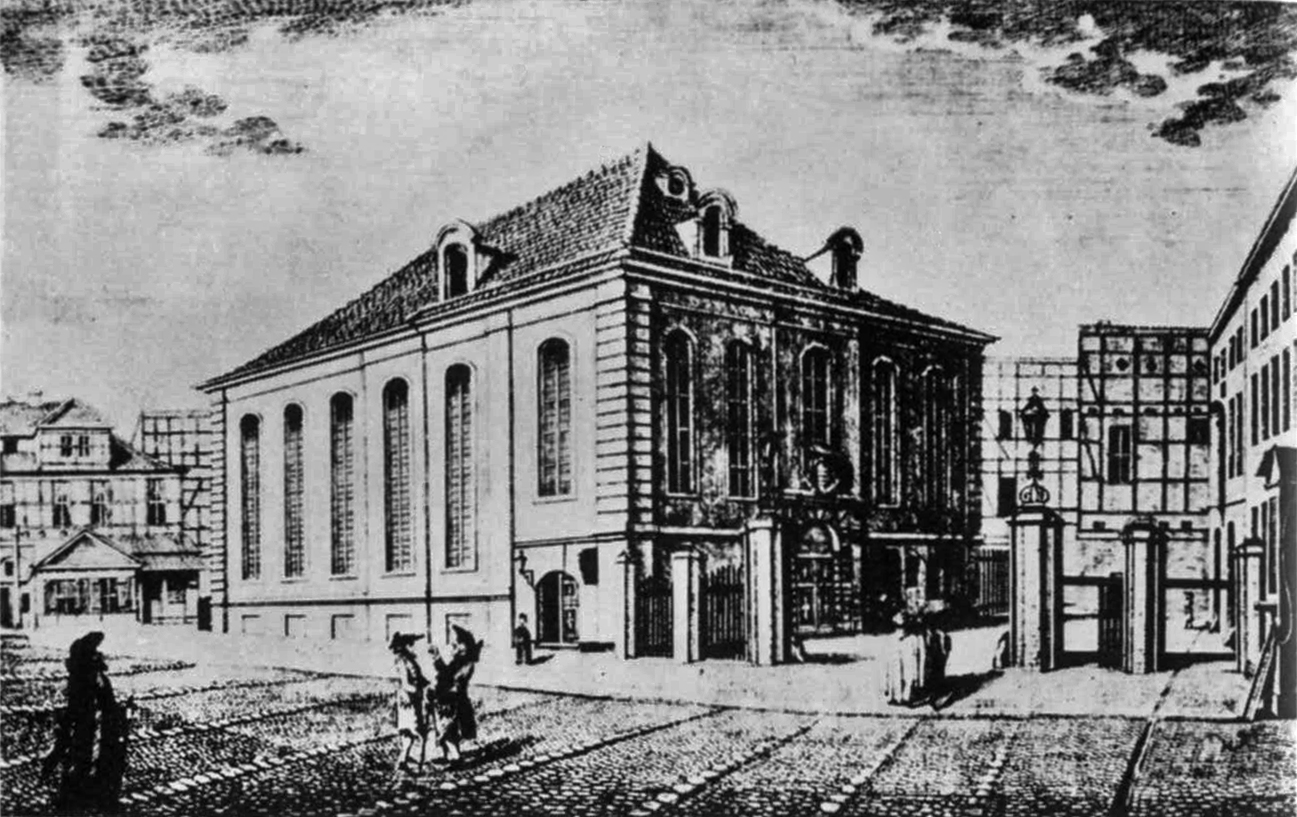
Old synagogue, etching of Friedrich August Calau

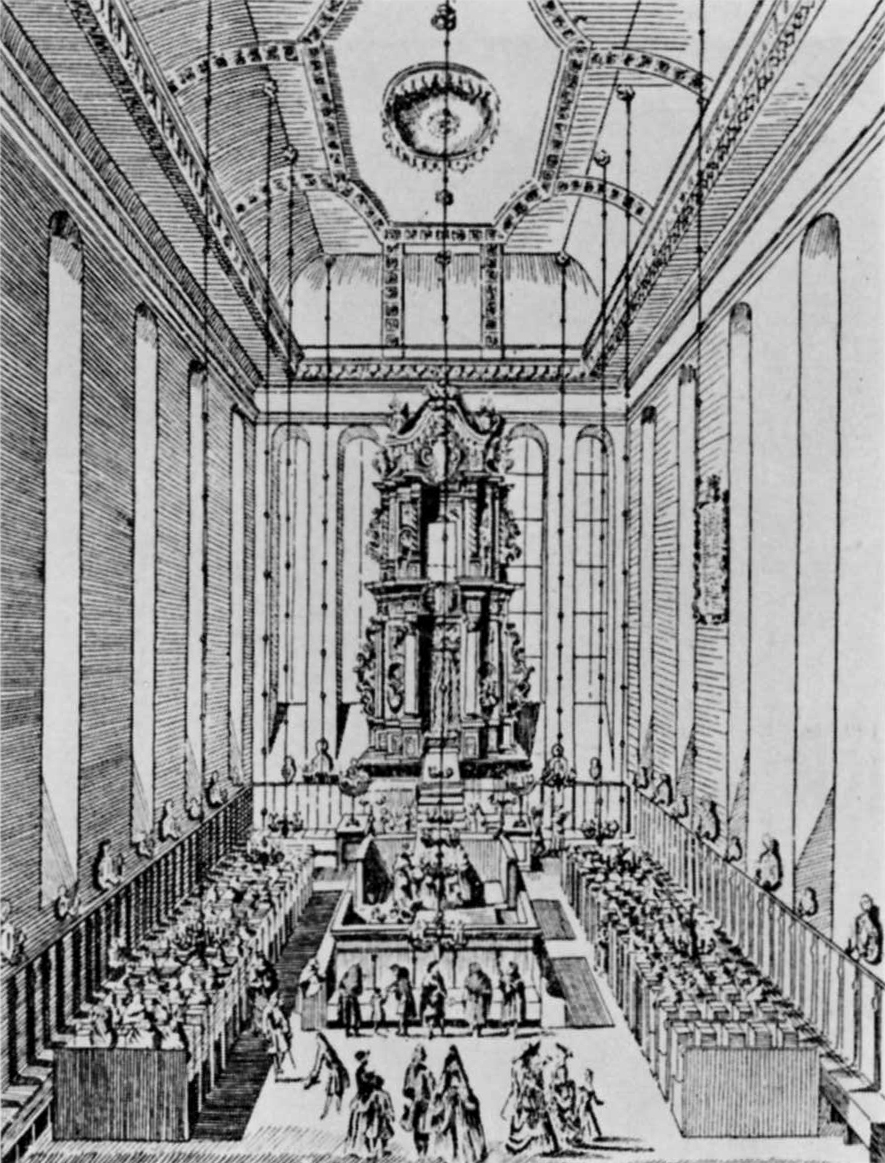
The interior

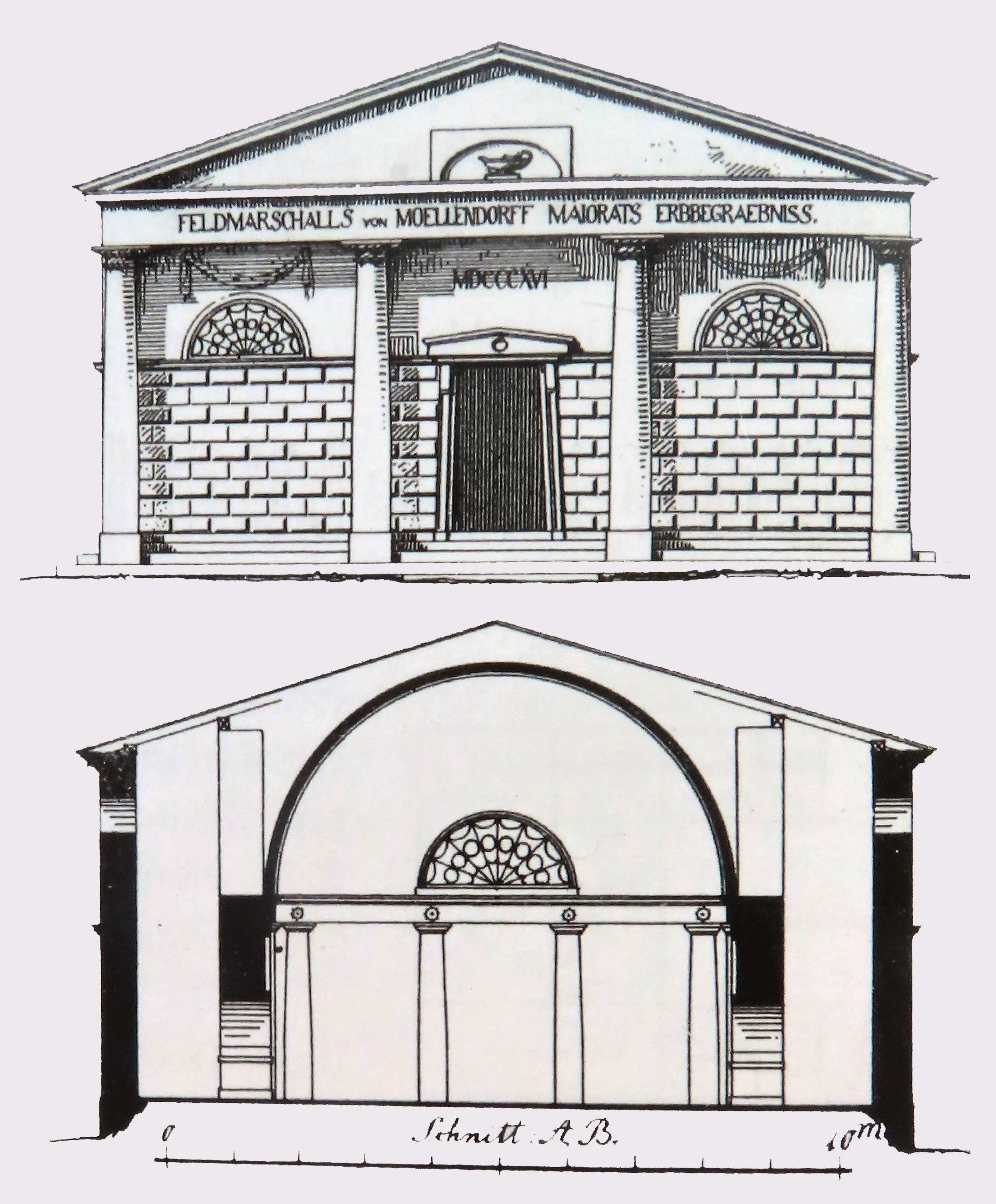
Plan of the Mausoleum in the Gadow Castle Park 1816

== His transfer to Marienwerder in West Prussia ==
From 1816 to 1820 he worked as Country master builder for the Royal Government Marienwerder in West Prussia. From the laying of the foundation stone on 3 May 1818 until its ceremonial consecration on 3 August 1823, a Protestant church was built in Mewe according to plans by Schinkel, under the construction supervision of Sachs. In other church buildings in Stuhm and Marienwerder he was discriminated against by Protestant clergy anti-Semitic, which is why he built here as a Jew. He implemented Schinkel's designs despite all adversities. There were great difficulties in doing so, because the construction drawings of Schinkel were partly not understood or misinterpreted by Sachs' superior, the government and building official Balkow (1816–1825 building official in Marienwerder). In 1819, Salomo Sachs opened a Baugewerkschule in Marienwerder, which existed for 15 years until 1834. He took over the management and offered free lessons.

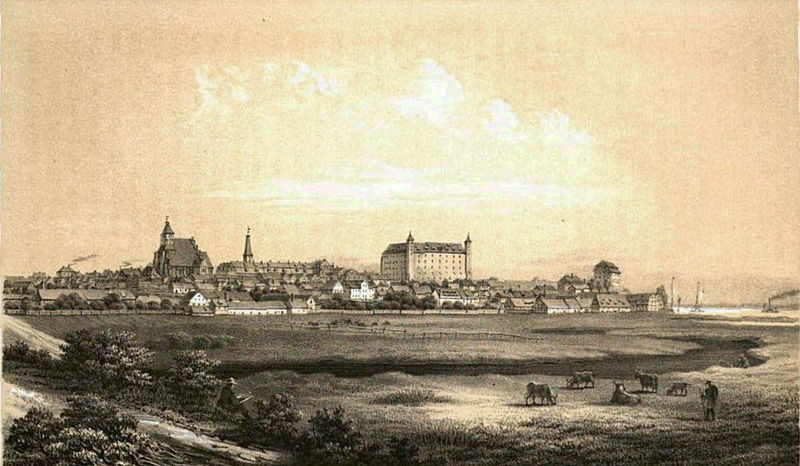
Mewe on the Vistula around the middle of the 19th century – with the Protestant church in the middle

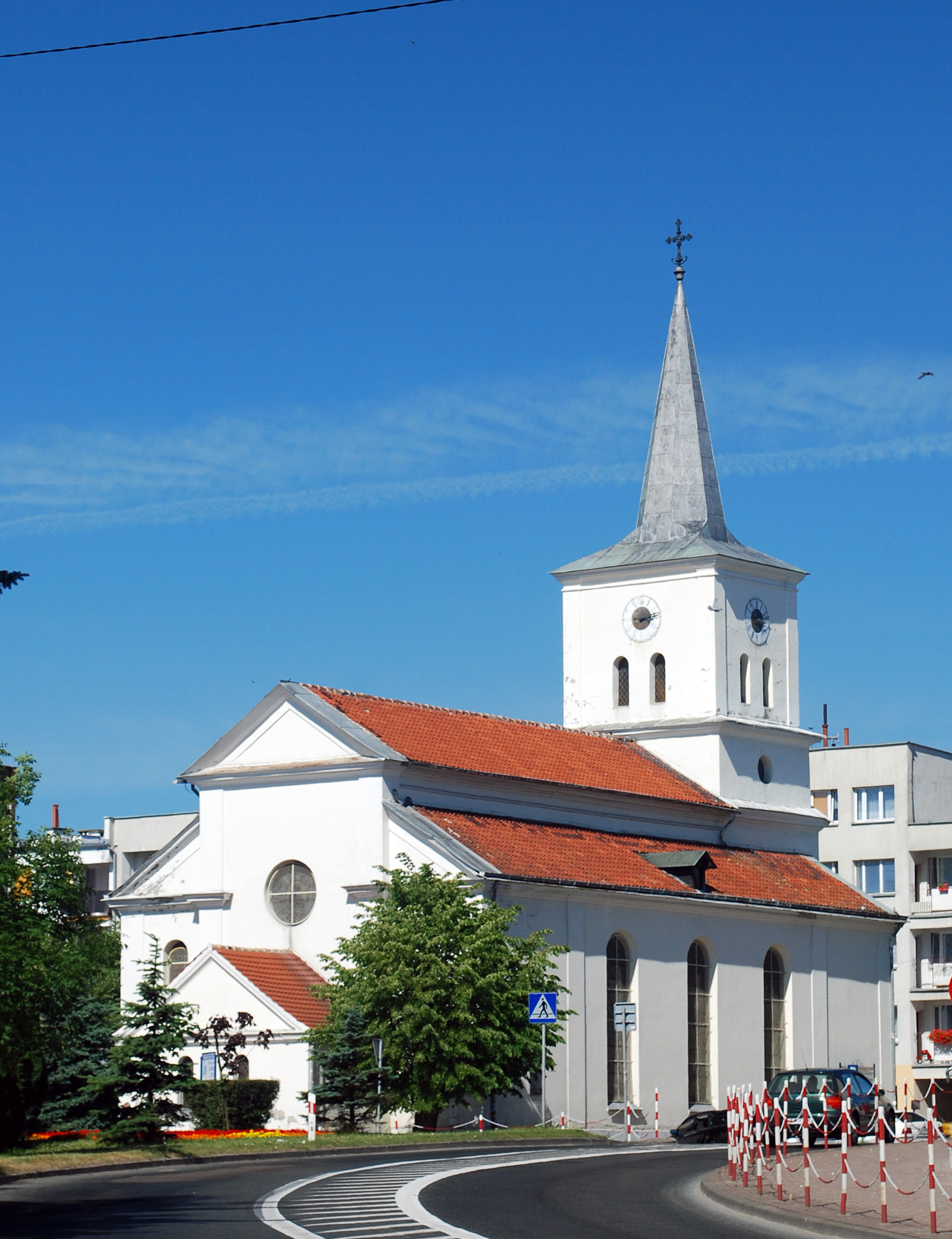
Former Protestant church of Stuhm – today Sztum.

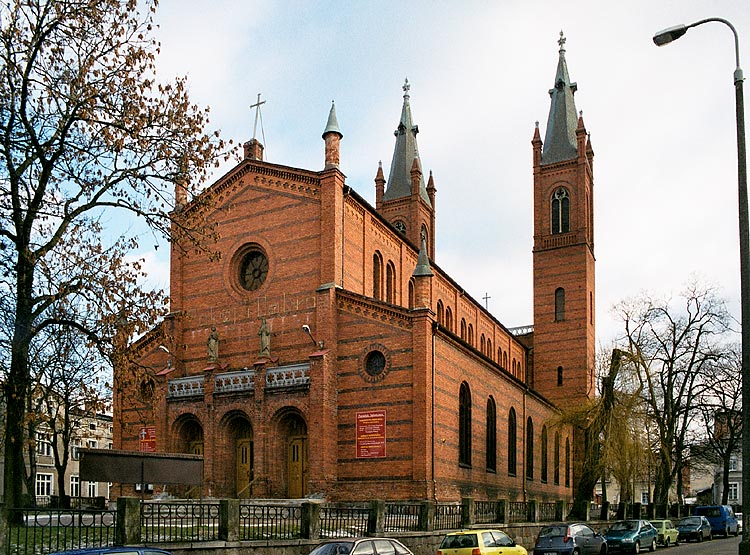
Church of the Holy Trinity and the Assumption in Kwidzyn (Marienwerder)

== His transfer back to Potsdam ==
From 1820 to 1830 he was again, under his qualification, employed as Country master builder in the fourth building district at the Royal Government in Potsdam and was an employee of Karl Friedrich Schinkel. From 8 December 1820 Sachs was appointed to the examination commission for building craftsmen, and his area of responsibility here was the district of Spandau. At this time he lived at Spandauerstraße 49 in the center of Berlin. On 3 December 1824 a so-called art road from Prenzlauer Tor to Heinersdorf was approved, it is today's Prenzlauer Allee. Sachs had done all the preliminary work here, including surveying, design, situation plan and cost planning. He brought together the most distinguished residents, who enabled him to do the necessary work financially. This group formed a public limited company, which, with the help of the government, put the project into practice. In 1825 Sachs began planning the new construction of the Fasanenmeisterhaus in the Tiergarten in its improved loam construction. The commission was given by the royal chief hunter Friedrich Detlev Graf von Moltke. (1750–1825). According to an expert opinion, issued by Friedrich Schinkel and Johann Carl Ludwig Schmid, on his rammed earth pisé buildings, which was devastating for Sachs, he was unable to complete his work. Schinkel was commissioned by the Oberbaudeputat to execute the house in classical brick construction.
The animosity of the members of the Oberbaudeputation against Salomo Sachs increased further.
After Sachs was crushed by the Oberbaudepartement with his plans for the new home of the pheasant hunter, he was commissioned by Wilhelm zu Sayn-Wittgenstein-Hohenstein to hand over his drawings and cost accounting, for comparison with Schinkel's designs. After the handover, his work disappeared forever, despite demands for restitution, and Sachs was not paid for his expenses until 17 years later. Despite these setbacks and insinuations, he continued to work on his reputation. In 1829 he was commissioned by the sons of Otto von Voß to Birkholz (Bernau near Berlin) to design and rebuild a new church tower. At the same time Carl Justus Heckmann for the roofing and Carl August Mencke for the gilding of the spire were also appointed to the building work. From 1829 to 1830, Sachs became increasingly disliked by the royal government and his superiors. He had been commissioned by the military, who were convinced of his cost-saving clay construction method, to build a cavalry horse stable in Charlottenburg. At the request of the military leadership, the construction was to take place very quickly and under his sole leadership without the participation of the royal government. This caused further tensions with his superiors, as the design in brick was already available.

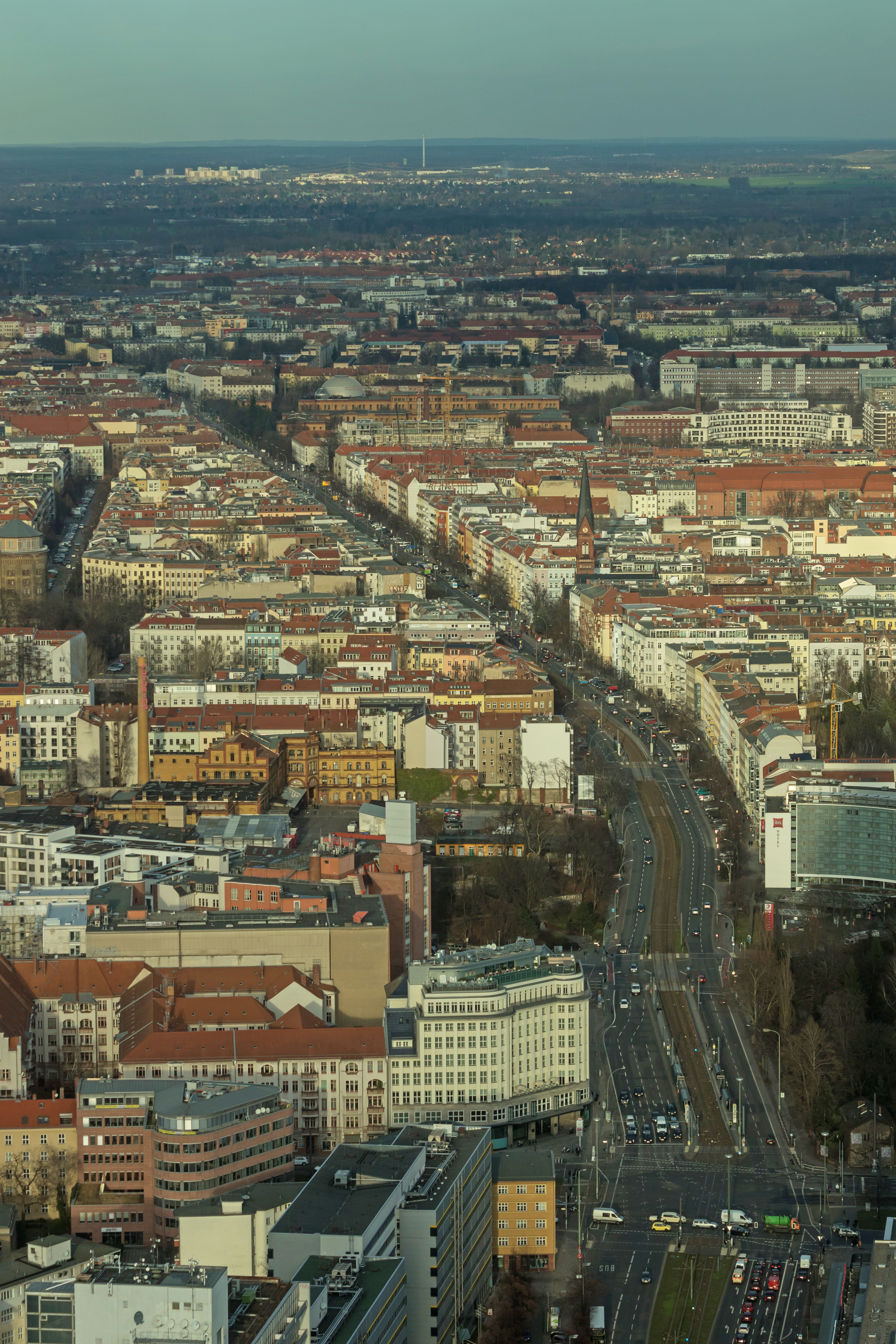
View of Prenzlauer Allee from the television tower

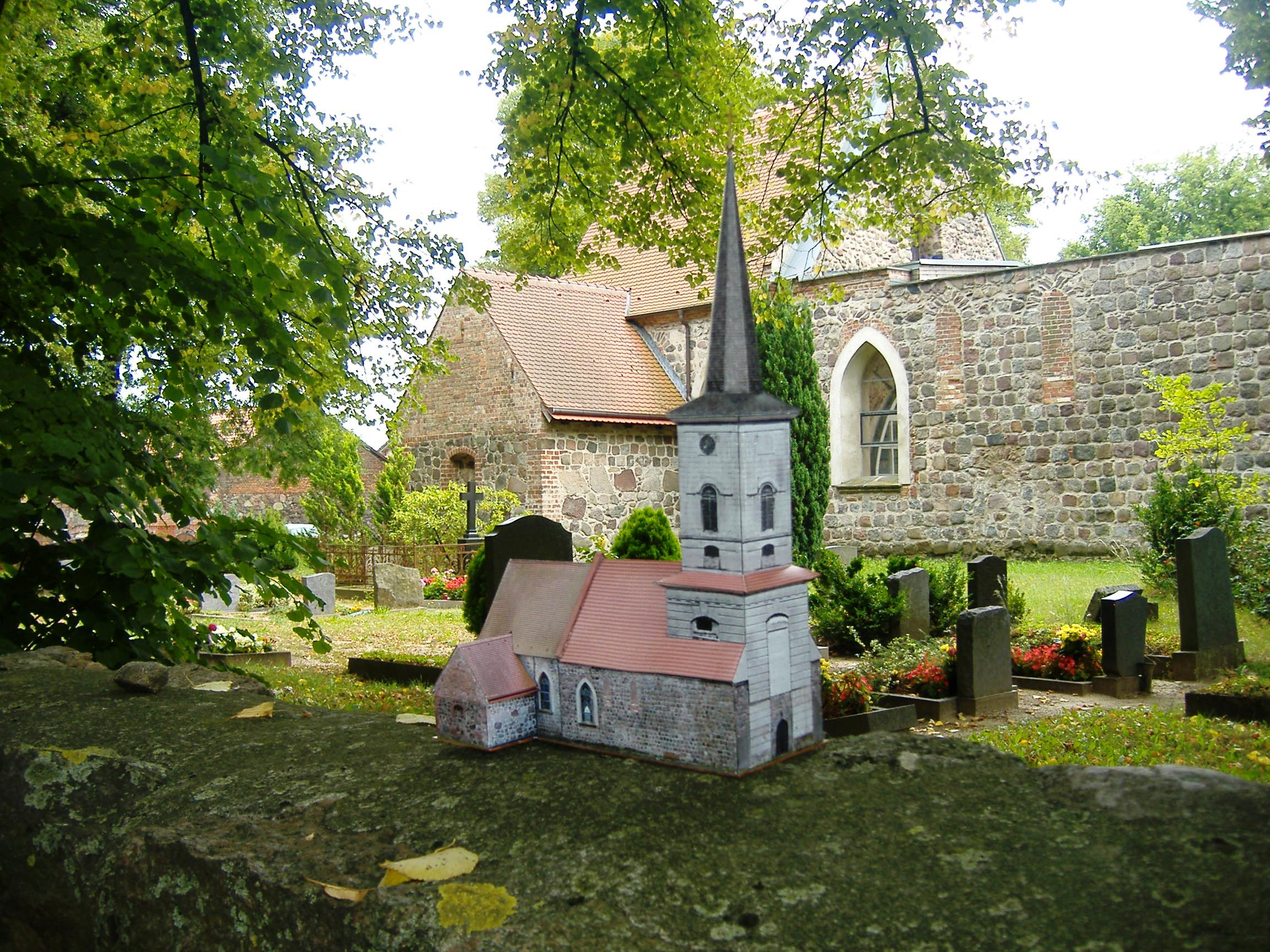
Church Birkholz Model 1:100

== The involuntary retirement ==
With his involuntary retirement in 1830, Salomo Sachs' career in the Prussian civil service came to an end. In June, he once again expressed his unbroken enthusiasm for his work with a design for a monument to Friedrich II. He was praised for this by his superiors. From then on, he devoted himself to his literary work, the restoration of his reputation and the validity of his improved pisé building (through expert opinions)

=== The invention of a new roof covering with roofing felt ===
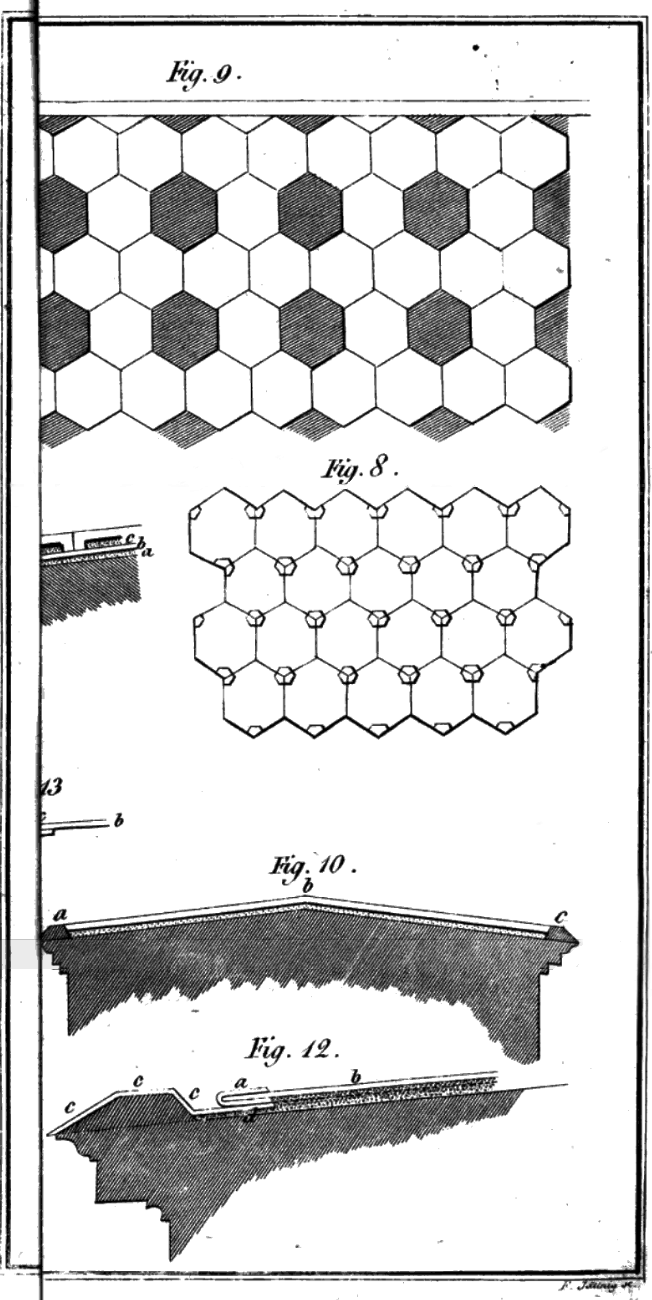
Laying technique for roofing felt shingles, invention by Salomo Sachs 1837

On November 25, 1835, the Royal Court pewter master Carl Friedrich Michaut (1799–1877) laid the foundation stone for the new house of his father Johann Friedrich Michaut (1758–1834) and grandfather Jeremie Michaut (1719–1793) at An der Schleuse 13 in Berlin, which had to be completely demolished due to dilapidation. It was located on the Friedrichswerder, opposite Schinkel's Academy of Architecture. Here, Salomo Sachs was able to rescue Mr. Michaut from a difficult situation with the invention of his new roof covering, because the clay roof of the new house, invented by Dorn, was leaking.

Other houses that were roofed according to Sachs' invention:

- the house of the pharmacist Blell, Neuer Markt 14,
- the house of the master carpenter Caspar, Karlstraße No. 21
- and on one of the three pavilions of the newly built house of the local merchants, on the Herkules Bridge.

With his applied experiments in roofing with paper, pitch and tar, Salomo Sachs became the inventor of roofing felt and in his treatise, Instructions for the production of a new, completely fireproof and absolutely waterproof roof covering for very flat roofs (balconies), he describes the production, handling and advantages over Dorn's clay roofs. A few years later in 1841, the method was taken up again and refined by the Neustrelitz architect Friedrich Wilhelm Buttel, a colleague of Schinkel. Buttler published this in his work Practical Experiences on Dornsche Roofs, together with a detailed description, cost calculation and drawing of such constructions, which give them greater durability and tightness, and an appendix on flat roofs in economic buildings.

=== His 50th anniversary of office and 70th birthday ===
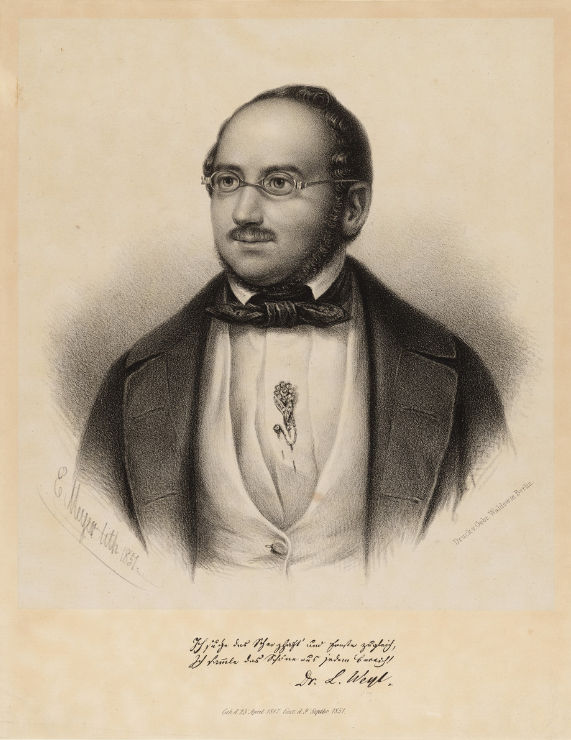
Portrait Louis Weyl (23 April 1815 – 9 September 1851). Half-length portrait from the front, head turned to the left, before indicated background. Below the picture of facsimile autograph and life data: "I am looking for the jocular and serious at the same time, I collect the beautiful from every area! Dr. L. Weyl."

Booklet for the celebration of Solomon Sachs 9 December 1842 in German

In honour of his 50th anniversary, scholars, architects, merchants, writers and friends gathered for lunch on 9 December 1842 in a daytime restaurant in Berlin.The room was decorated by the royal landscape and theater decoration painter Johann Karl Jakob Gerst (1792–1854) with the Portrait of Sachs under Flower garlands. Part of the table decoration had the shape of the Sloping Tower of Pisa, with the inscription "Sachs' indestructible Pisébau".Among the dinner speakers and guests were community leader Joseph Lehmann, editor of the magazine for foreign literature, Dr. Löwe as organizer of the festival and Prof. Wilhelm Stier. Stier had been trained by Solomon as a student of the Bauakademie in 1816 and they had become friends. Another speaker was the writer, philosopher, bookseller and humorist Dr. Louis Weyl. (* 23 April 1817; † 9 September 1851). With his humorous lecture on the arts, especially architecture, and a table song, he delighted the society.
On 22 December 1842 Sachs celebrated his seventieth birthday.
Sachs' varied literary activities continued in 1844. His astronomical writings – Achsenparallelismus und Sonnensystem, i.e. parallelism of axes and the solar system, appeared in Berlin in 1850, but were not as successful. However, his two self-developed illustrative models for teaching, the "Diagonon" and the "Cylindrical Ellipto-Tellurium", are to be praised. In 1845, Solomon wrote a pamphlet On the existence of air and water pressure, which was directed against Friedrich Johann von Drieberg.

== The emancipation of the Jews always remained an important concern ==
An article in the Allgemeine Zeitung des Judentums of 26 June 1847 once again demonstrates the efforts of Solomon Sachs, even at the high age of 75, that Jewish emancipation continued to be a current topic for him.

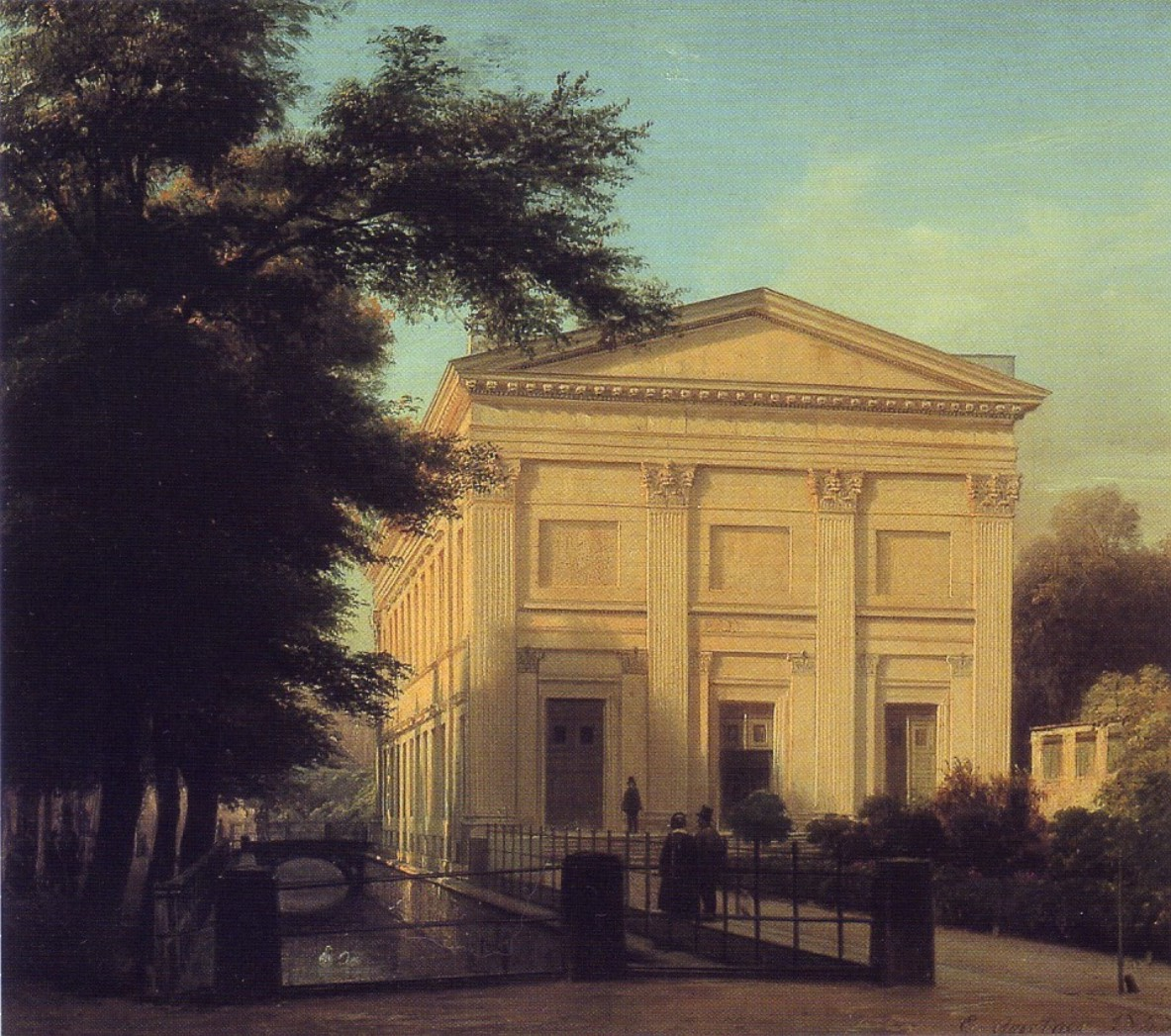
Sing-Akademie – Tagungsort der Nationalversammlung 1848

A controversial statement by the Landtag commissioner Minister Ernst von Bodelschwingh the Elder, during the discussion of the Prussian Jewish Law of 1847 at a city council meeting, led to a retrospective encounter with Sachs.

Some people had wrongly assumed that here in Berlin a Jewish building inspector had once existed.

— Ernst von Bodelschwingh the Elder

He drove to the hotel of the Ministry of the Interior and waited for the minister there to hand over his biography with picture and signature as a souvenir. Bodelschwingh thanked him and asked him whether he had remained true to the Jewish faith and received a pension from the state.

However, but so small that I cannot really blame Your Honourable Excellency if you doubted my existence.

— Salomo Sachs

On 25 July 1848, the constituent Prussian National Assembly met at its 32nd session in the rooms of the Sing-Akademie zu Berlin. In the commission report on the motion of the members of parliament Count Eduard von Reichenbach, Dr. Stein and Dr. Elsner to change the meeting room of 26 May, Baurat Eduard Knoblauch had been commissioned to find or rebuild a suitable larger plenary hall with various building surveys. A provisional construction of a new house for the Prussian Chambers had also been suggested to the commission by the untiringly Sachs. His plan for the house referred to the part of the chestnut grove at Am Kupfergraben that adjoins Dorotheenstraße.

"This morning, in the 83rd year, of the Köngl. building inspector Sachs gently and painlessly fell asleep..
The funeral will take place from the house of death Grenadierstraße 18th (Scheunenviertel) Wednesday the 16th, Vormitt. 9 o'clock. This is reported to his friends in Berlin 14 May 1855 and the bereaved." (Quoting Vossische Zeitung Berlin of 15 May 1855)

== Buildings, drafts and expert opinions ==
- 1793: Facade designs for the New Bailiwick in Berlin
- 1796: Reconstruction of the burnt down Ephraim's house at Spandauer Straße Berlin. Property of the Ephraim family. For example, Nathan Veitel Ephraim (1658–1748) and Veitel Heine Ephraim, who gave the Ephraim Palace its name, lived here.
- 1798: Design of a mortuary and rescue centre (not executed)
- 1806: Designs for the Neue Wache and of the Opera and Palace Bridge in Berlin
- 1806 – 1807: Conversion of the residence of merchant Israel Moses Henoch at Schlossplatz 13
- 24 April 1810: Commission to Sachs of the "Section for Culture and Public Education" with its then director Wilhelm von Humboldt (20 February 1809 to 23 June 1810) for an expert opinion on 100 machine drawings to be purchased for teaching purposes, for Professor Johann Philipp Hoberts (born 22 April 1759 in Berlin; died 6 February 1826 ibid.) mechanical engineering class and Johann Gottlieb Schlaetzer's drawing class.
- 1815–1816 Construction drawings for the dome of the Old Synagogue in the Heidereutergasse (according to an expert's report specially prepared by Sachs, for the Jewish community, after the dome was damaged by moisture).
- 1816: Plans for the construction of the mausoleum for the late Prussian Field Marshal General Wichard Joachim Heinrich von Moellendorff (1724–1816) in the park of Gadow Palace in the West Prignitz
- 1816–1818: Construction management of the Protestant church in Stuhm (after design by Schinkel)
- 1818–1823: Construction management of the Protestant church in Mewe (according to Schinkel's design; demolished in autumn 1957)
- 1819: Construction management of the Protestant church in Marienwerder (Sachs found that Schinkel's construction drawings had again been misunderstood and reported to Berlin that he would leave the project estimate until clarification. Since he did not receive an answer, he could not continue with the construction).Trinity and Assumption Church in Kwidzyn (Marienwerder) according to probably Schinkel's design, since the construction was planned in 1819 with two towers.
- 1820: School building in Weißensee (with the permission of the royal government to use loam construction instead of half-timbered construction)
- 1821: Appraisal for the newly built organ (Buchholz & Sohn company) in the village church in Schöneberg, together with music director Christian Friedrich Gottlieb Wilke from Neuruppin on behalf of the royal government
- 1822: Military economy building in the courtyard of the barracks of the Kaiser-Alexander-Garde-Grenadier-Regiment in Berlin (400 feet long, in loam construction)
- 1823: Second contract from the War Ministry to build a 700-foot long wall for the local royal powder factory using the low-cost pisé construction method. The cost and execution for a brick wall had already been submitted by the building authorities. However, the ministry decided in favour of the rammed earth wall to its complete satisfaction.
- 1824: Planning of an art street from Prenzlauer Tor to Heinersdorf (today's Prenzlauer Allee; execution by a newly founded stock corporation)
- 1825: Planning in Pisé style for the new building of the pheasant master house in the royal pheasantry in the Tiergarten. The order was given by the royal master hunter Friedrich Detlef Graf von Moltke (not executed).
- 1827: Construction appraisal (material and cost accounting) on December 7 for the building timber regulation of the municipality Zehlendorf in the Mühlenhoff municipal office, this was confirmed by the municipality after Sachs’ report and passed in January 1828
- 1829: Project planning and site management for the new construction of the church tower in Birkholz Bernau near Berlin
- 1829–1830: Planning and execution of a cavalry horse stable in Charlottenburg, on behalf of the military in Pisé construction.
- 1830 June Publication of a design for a monument to Frederick the Great.
- 1842 Drawn self-portrait for the binding of his memoirs. right: The figurative representation of mathematics left: The figurative representation of architecture Above: A symbol of religion. The star of hope in the midst of radiant eternity.
- 1848 Planning of a house for the plenary hall of the Prussian National Assembly

== Honors ==
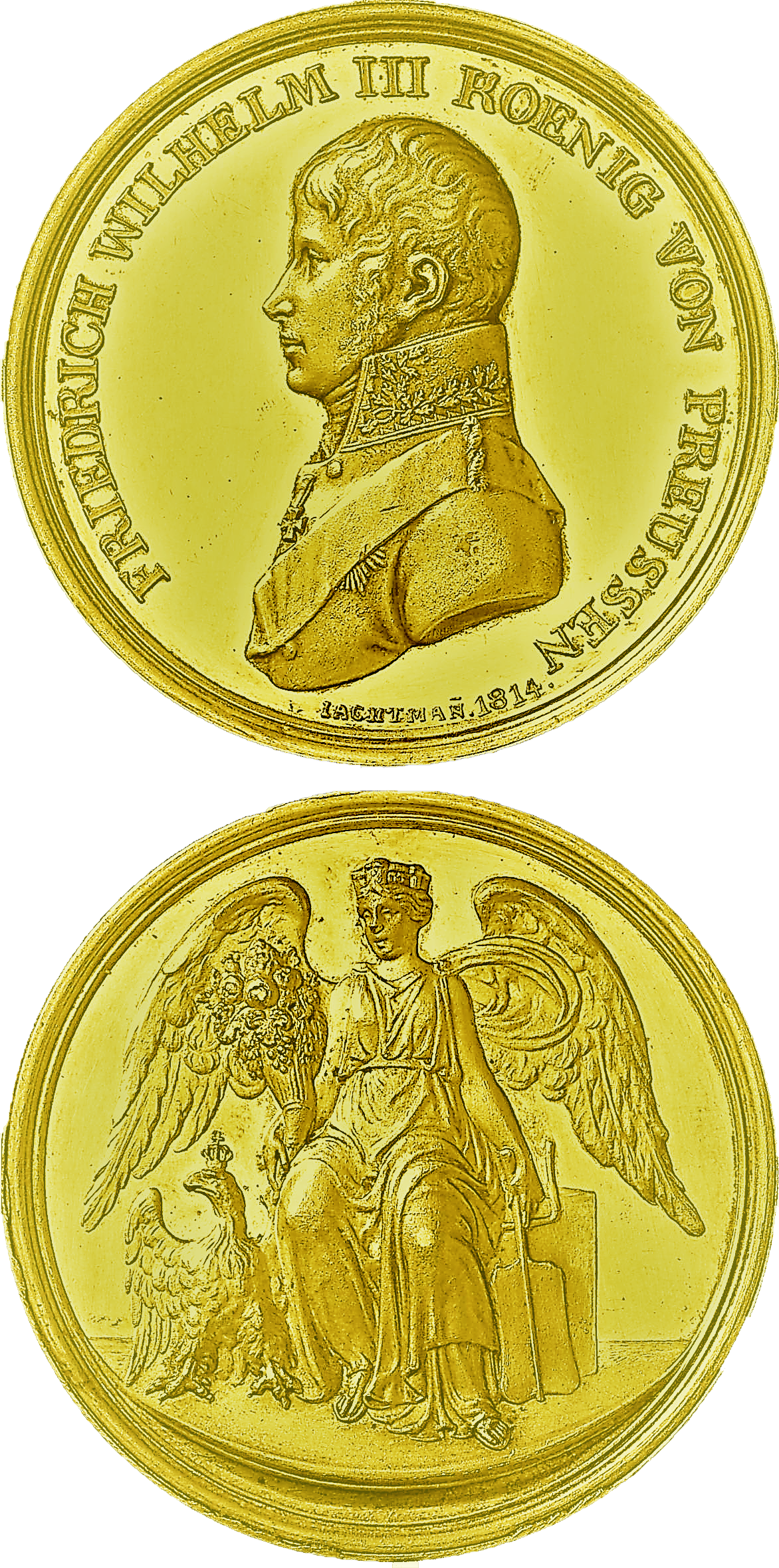
Golden Medal for Art and Science Prussia

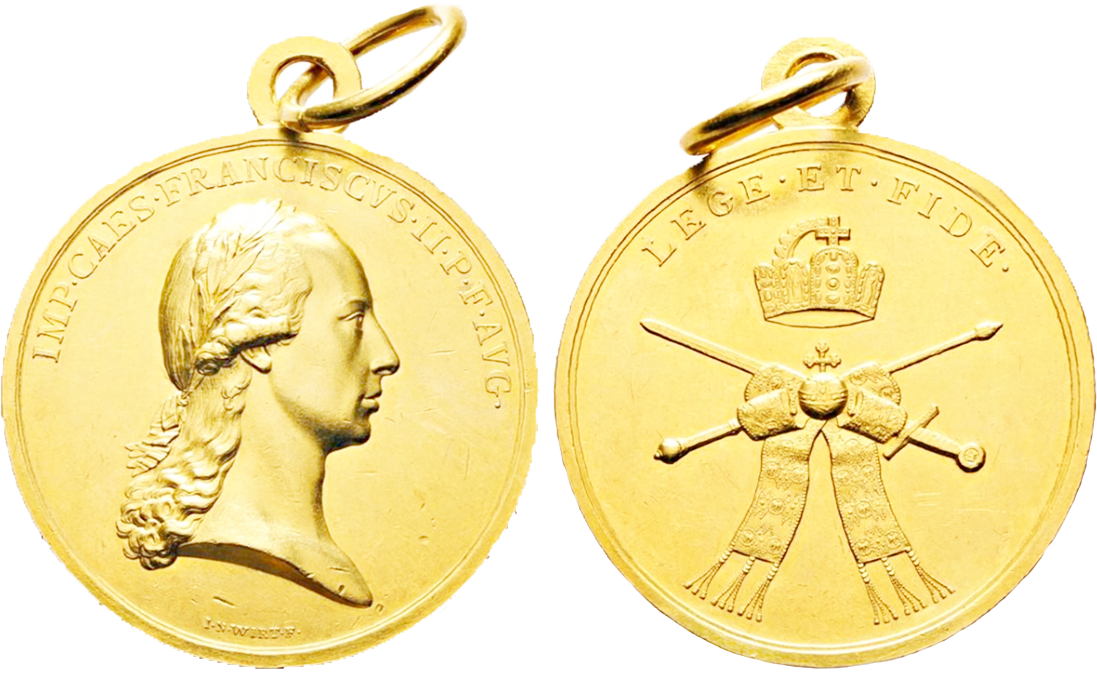
Kaiser Franz II. Österreich Medaille von Johann Nepomuk Wirt

- 1796 First public honor with the Academic Silver Award Medal for the facade designs of the New City Bailiwick.
- 1823 Gratification from the Ministry of War of 100 thalers for the construction military-economy building on the courtyard of the barracks of the Emperor Alexander Guard Grenadier Regiment in Berlin from 1822.
- 1824 Gratuity from the Ministry of War of 100 talers for the construction of the Pisé Wall at the Royal Powder Factory of 1823.
- 1831 Golden Medal for Art and Science from the King of Prussia Friedrich Wilhelm III. for - Ueber das Bau-Recht in seinem ganzen Umfang (On the Building Law in its entirety)
- 1832 Great Golden Medal from the Emperor Franz II. of Austria for the work of Sachs - Ueber das Bau-Recht in seinem ganzen Umfang (On Building Law in its entirety) - presented to him by Count Trauttmannsdorf-Weinsberg, Royal Austrian Envoy in Berlin.

== Inventions ==
- 1812 Rental tax levy (today's municipal tax)
- 1817 Calculator for multiplying and dividing
- 1813 Founder of the registration and deregistration system with the Berlin police (residents' registration offices)
- 1827 patent window. The patent was valid for 8 years.
- 1829 A new roof construction – fireproof and waterproof
- Mortar stones

== Newly developed games ==
- The arrival in Olympus, an entertaining and instructive game: ib. 1815, 8.
- The true prophet in all circumstances of life. A newly invented game: ib. 1815, 12; ib. 1827, 12.
- One day in Berlin. An entertaining game of dice, along with 41 views of the most distinguished buildings and statues of this residence. 2nd ed.: ib. 1817, f.
- Moira or the journey through life. For entertainment in the winter evenings: Berlin, 1817 et seq.
- A day in Potsdam. An entertaining dice game, together with a description and 51 views etc.: ib. 1819, 8.

== Non-fiction and literary works ==
- Versuch, algebraische Aufgaben vom 1. Grade mit 1 u. 2 unbekannten Grössen, ohne Algebra, aufzulösen: ib. 1799, 8.
- Darstellung geometrischer Wahrheiten für Künstler u. s. w., überhaupt für Nichtmathematiker. Mit 4 KT.: ib. 1806, 8.
- Auflösung der in Meyer Hirsch Sammlung von Beispielen, Formeln u. Aufgaben aus der Buchstabenrechnung u. Algebra enthaltend Gleichungen und Aufgaben: ib. 1810, 8.; ib. 1821, 8; verbessert: ib. 1829, 8; ib 1839, 8.
- Supplement zur Auflösungen der Meyer Hirsch'schen Aufgaben u. s. w.: ib. 1811, 8.
- Gemeinnütziges Rechenbuch im Zusammenhang mit arithmetischen Auflösungen der aus der Algebra entlehnten Aufgaben: ib. 1811, 8.
- Ideen zur Vertheilung der Einquartierungen in einer großen Stadt, Berlin 1813. 8.
- Deutschlands bewaffnete Jugend, oder erste Grundzüge zur Errichtung einer Reichswehr zu Befestigung und Erhaltung des Weltfriedens. Berlin 1814. 8.
- Allg. Strassen- u. Wohnungsanzeiger oder Adressbuch für Berlin: ib. 1812 Julius Eduard Hitzig Berlin, 8. Mit einem Grundriss.
- Neuster und vollst. Rechnender Haushalter u. Kaufmann: Halle, 1815, 8.
- Plan von Berlin, nach den neusten Veränderungen: ib. 1816; f.; ib. 1827, f.
- Neuerfundene Rechenmaschine, die bei allen vorkommenden Rechnungsarten auf eine sehr leichte und sehr einfache Weise multiplizieren und dividirt. Die Form ein Triangels auf Holz geklebt, nebst Erklärung: ib. 1817.
- Der verbesserte Pisé – Bau; ein Beitrag zur Vervollkommnung des Staatshaushalts, nebst Bemerkung über ein auf Befehl u. s. w. ausgeführtes Militär-Oekonomie-Gebäude von 400 Fuss Länge: ib. 1822, 8.
- Anleitung zur Erdbau – Kunst (Pisé – Bau); mit Anwendungen auf alle Arten von Stadt- und Landbauten, nebst einer vollständigen Lehre von der Konstruction der Tonnen-, Kappen- und Kreuzgewölben in reinem Lehm u. s. w.: ib. 1825, 8. Mit 4 KT. In Fol.
- Ueber das Baurecht in seinem ganzen Umfang, oder Grundlage einer vollständigen und zeitgemässen verbesserten Bau – Ordnung. 2 Theil: 1831, 8.Vollständiger Unterricht in der Anfertigung der Baubeschläge: ib. 1827, 8.
- Sammlung von Bauanschlägen für alle Zweige der bürgerlichen Baukunst. Ein Taschenbuch für Architekten u. s. w.: ib. 1828, 8.
- Vorschläge zur Verbesserung der Weichseldämme, um künftige Ueberschwemmungen für die Niederungen unschädlich zu machen, zum Besten für die verunglückten Niederungsbewohner. Berlin 1829, Salomo Sachs Selbstverlag (mit 2 Auflagen im gleichen Jahr)
- Beschreibung einer neu erfundenen Dach – Construction, zu städtischen u. ländlichen Gebäuden aller Art anwendbar, welche nicht blos wasserdicht und dauerhaft, sondern auch von Aussen und Innen völlig feuerfest ist und alle Vortheile der Flächen mit Metall gedeckten Dächer gewährt, ohne kostbarer als die gewöhnliche Stroh – Bedachung: ib. 1829, 8.
- Der wohlfeile Bauherr. Ein Handbuch für Hausbesitzer und alle die es werden wollen, oder vollständige auf Praxis begründete Belehrung über Alles, was bei dem Kauf städtischer und ländlicher Grundstücke u. s. w. wahrzunehmen ist u. s. w.: ib. 1832, 4.
- Kurzer Abriss der theoretischen u. praktischen Arithmetik. Als Leitfaden für die Lehrer und als Anhalt für Schüler; ib. 1833, 8.
- Kurzer Abriss der reinen u, prakt. Geometrie u. s. w.: ib. 1833, 8.
- Allgemeiner Bau-Tarif oder genaue Angaben der Preise aller Bauarbeiten Und Materialien, welche sowohl bei Neubauten als Reparaturen am gewöhnlichsten vorkommen. In Beziehung auf Verf.`s Baurecht etc.: ib. 1833, 4.
- Elementar-Unterricht in der reinen und angewandten Mathematik, so wie in den damit in Beziehung stehenden Wissenschaften. Schüppel, Berlin 1833, urn:nbn:de:gbv:9-g-4882985 (3 Lehrbücher in der Digitalen Bibliothek Mecklenburg-Vorpommern).
- Kurzer Abriss der angewandten Mathematik ets.: ib. 1835, 8.
- Die Schieferdeckkunst in ihrem ganzen Umfang, praktisch dargestellt. Mit 12 Kupfertaf.: ib 1836, 8.
- Anweisung zur Anfertigung einer neuen, völlig feuerfesten uns absolut wasserdichten Dachdeckung für ganze Dächer (Altane), mittels eigens dazu erfundenen Harzplatten u.s.w. ib 1837, 8.
- Unterhaltende Verstandesübungen aus dem Gebiet der mathematischen Analyse. Schulmänner, Eltern und Erzieher gewidmet. 1. Klasse. Für Kinder von 6 bis 10 Jahre: ib 1836, 12; zweite Klasse. Für Kinder von 10–12 Jahren: ib. 1836, 12; driite Klasse. Für Kinder von 12–14 Jahre; ib. 1836, 12; vierte Klasse. Für Schüler über 14 Jahre: ib. 1836, 12; fünfte Klasse. Für Schüler über 16 Jahre: ib. 1837; 12.
- Special – Bau – Reglement für die Stadt Berlin. Mit Erläuterungen. Nebst einem Anhang, welcher die im Allg. Landrecht zerstreut befindlichen Bau – Gesetze enthält: 1838, 8.
- Salomo Sachs Autobiografie Mein fünfzigjähriges Dienstleben und literarischen Wirken. Ein Beitrag zur thatsächlichen Bedeutung der Frage: Sind die Juden zum Staatsdienst geeignet? Berlin 1842. / als Nachdruck: Hentrich & Hentrich, Berlin 2005, ISBN 3-933471-04-4. (Verlagsanzeige).
- Ueber die Existenz des Luft- und Wasserdrucks in Beziehung zu den dagegen gemachten Entwürfen des Herrn Baron von Drieberg. Ein Beitrag zur neuen Physik. Berlin 1845 Verlag von Julius Springer
- Das Sonnen-System, oder neue Theorie vom Bau der Welten. Schlesinger, Berlin 1850.
- Der Glaube meiner Väter: ib 1851, 8.

== Literature ==
- My Fifty Years of Service and Literary Work – I Atone for My Faith – Jewish Memoirs, Volume 3, Werner Heegewaldt and Oliver Sander, published by Hentrich&Henrich, 1. Auflage 2005 Printet in Germany ISBN 3-933471-04-4 (in German)
