= Mausoleum in the Gadow Castle Park =

Mausoleum in Brandenburg, Germany

Coordinates: 53.0762°N 11.6143°E

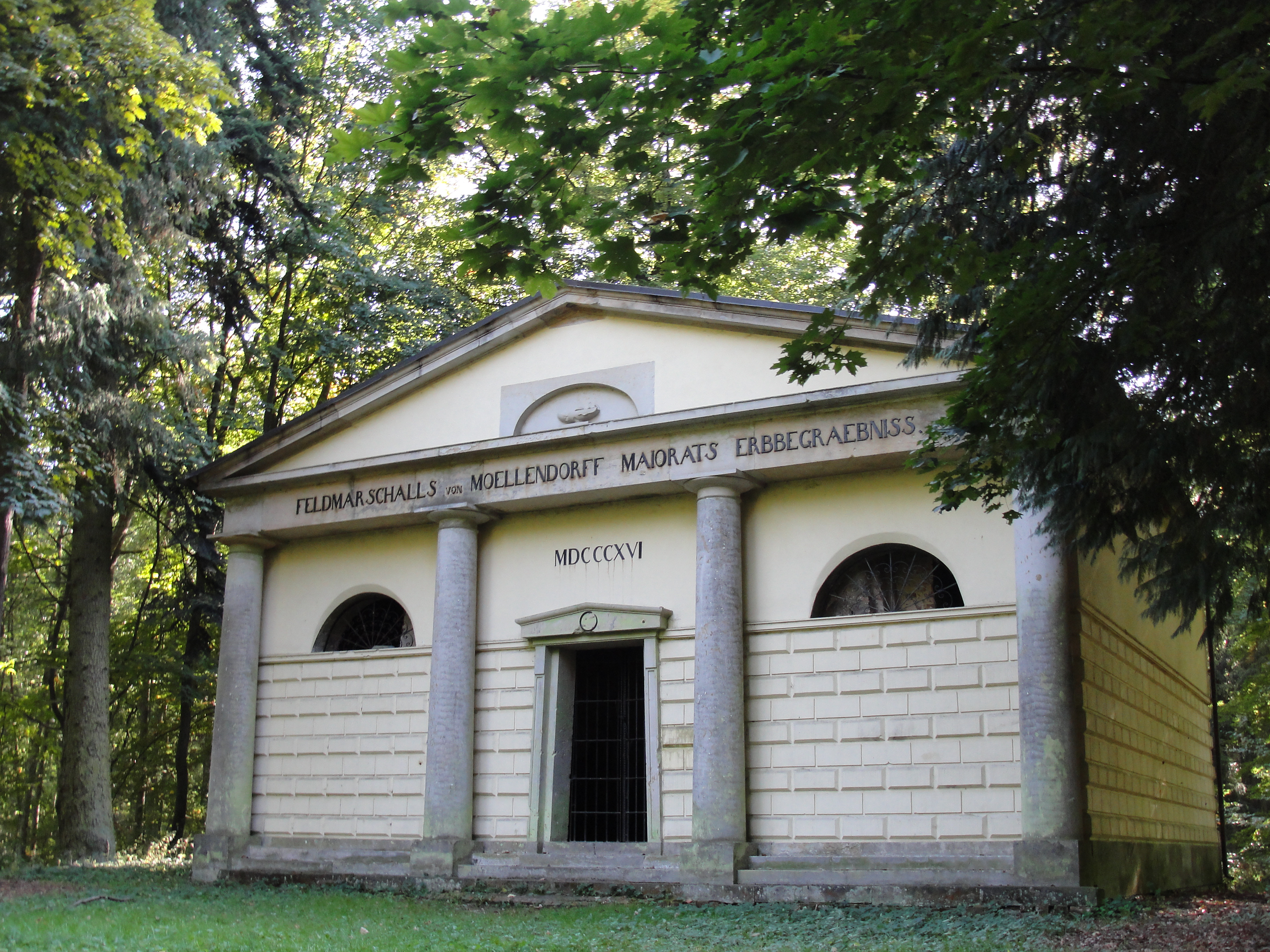
Mausoleum hereditary burial Möllendorff

The mausoleum in the Gadow Castle Park in the northwest of the Prignitz in Brandenburg was built in 1816 for the late Royal Prussian Field marshal Wichard Joachim Heinrich von Möllendorf (1724–1816). The architectural plans come from the Prussian architect Salomo Sachs. The building is one of the outstanding classicist monuments in Prignitz and the northwest Brandenburg region and is a listed building.

== Location ==
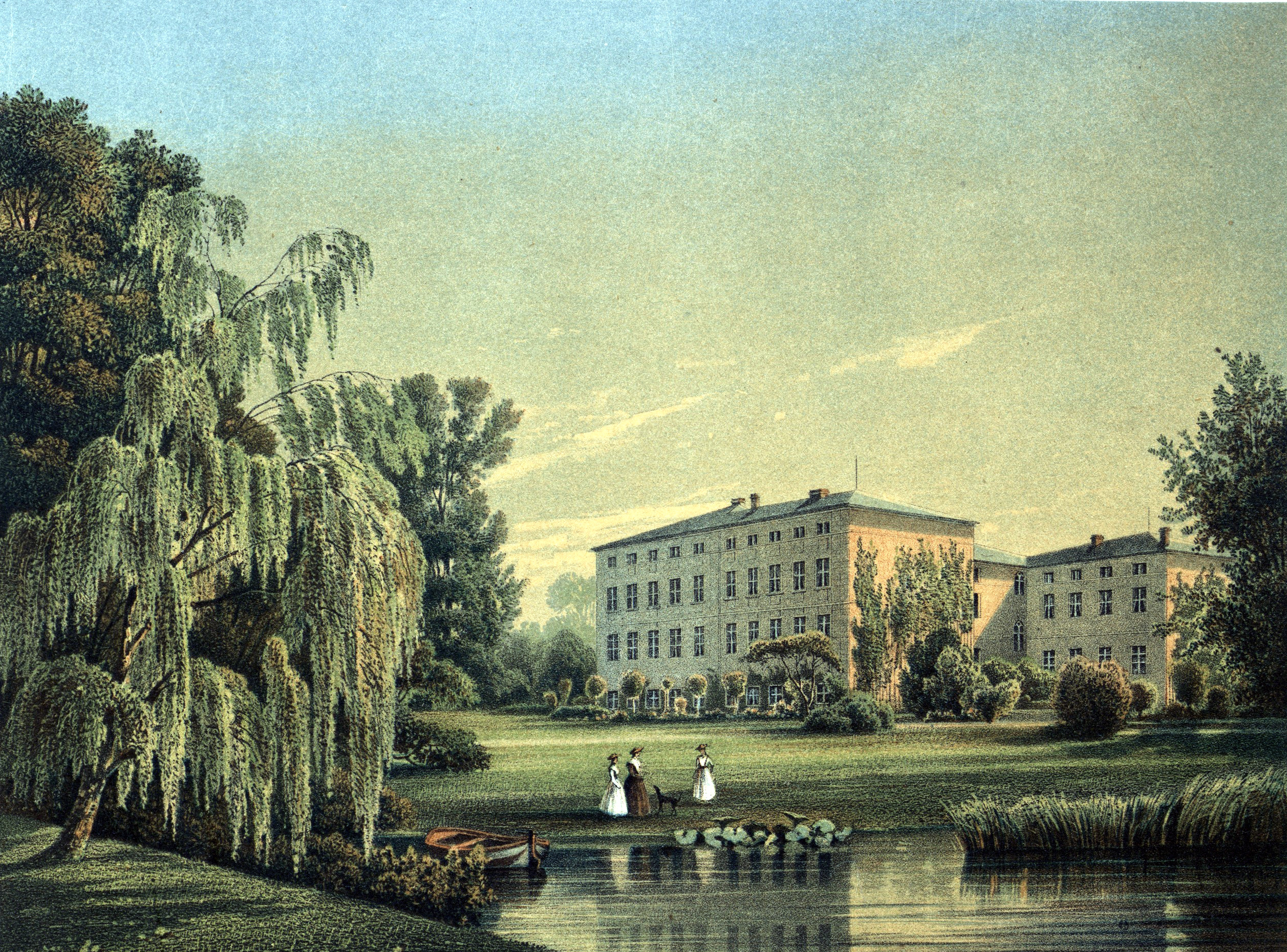
Manor house in Gadow Castle Park near Lanz around 1870

The grave is located on the edge of the wooded park of Gadow Castle between Lanz and Gadow. The mausoleum is located approximately 1.08 kilometers northeast of Lanz and approximately 700 meters to the southwest from Gadow.

== History ==
Wichard von Möllendorff had ordered the construction of the hereditary burial at its current location in his will. Gadow Castle was in his possession from 1804 to 1816. On October 28, 1817, the funeral ceremonies took place for Wichard von Möllendorf and Captain von Bonin-Möllendorff, who died in the Battle of Hagelberg on August 27, 1813 (Wichhart Friedrich Wilhelm Heinrich Ernst Bogislav (1782–1813)). was reburied in a hereditary burial at this point. The preacher's nephew from Cumlosen gave the speech at the opening of the mausoleum in front of clergy and numerous guests.

== Architecture ==
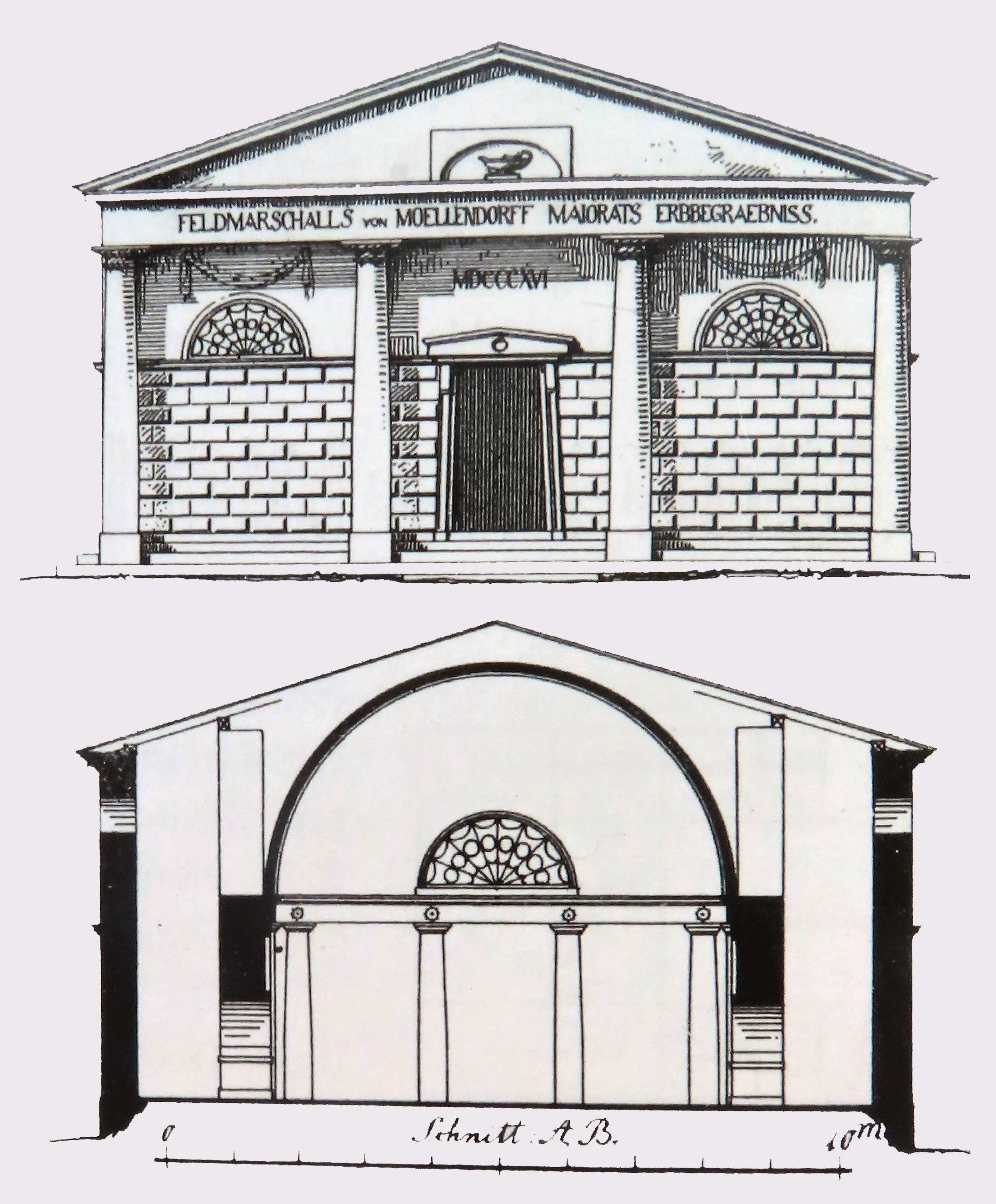
Architectural drawing of the mausoleum in Gadow Palace Park by architect Salomo Sachs (1816)

The building is built on an approximately square floor plan of 12 by 12 meters and shows a tomb structure based on Greek temple architecture with a columned entrance (portico) and a three-step staircase. Four Doric sandstone columns support a triangular gable, and the inscription can be read on the architrave above the columns:

FELDMARSCHALLS von MOELLENDORFF MAIORATS ERBBEGRAEBNISS MDCCCXVI.

A limestone block is embedded in the decorative area in the middle of the gable triangle, from which an arched niche with a skulpturale designed oil lamp was carved out. Up to half the height, the facade is surrounded by brick and plastered blocks, a so-called rustication. The remaining facade surfaces are covered with smooth plaster and the gable roof is covered with slate. The entrance is formed by a sandstone-framed door that tapers towards the top. The mausoleum has a total of seven frameless window openings, which are semicircular windows with a fan-shaped grid filling. The stone festoons above the entrance windows, designed by Sachs, are no longer preserved. The interior has a central nave, which was built as a barrel vault 6.5 meters high and 6.5 meters wide. The side walls have five squat, arched niche openings on the left and right sides, also known as arched arcades, through which sarcophagi can be inserted into the aisles behind them. The two side aisles are only accessible via the low openings and enabled choirs to set up discreetly at funeral ceremonies.

Between 2015 and 2016, the monument was renovated with funds from the German Foundation for Monument Protection and was opened to the public on November 22, 2016.

== Subsequent use ==
Together with the park and the castle, it will be used for tourism and partly as a museum.
