= Paul Ludwig Simon =

German architect and scientist (1771–1815)

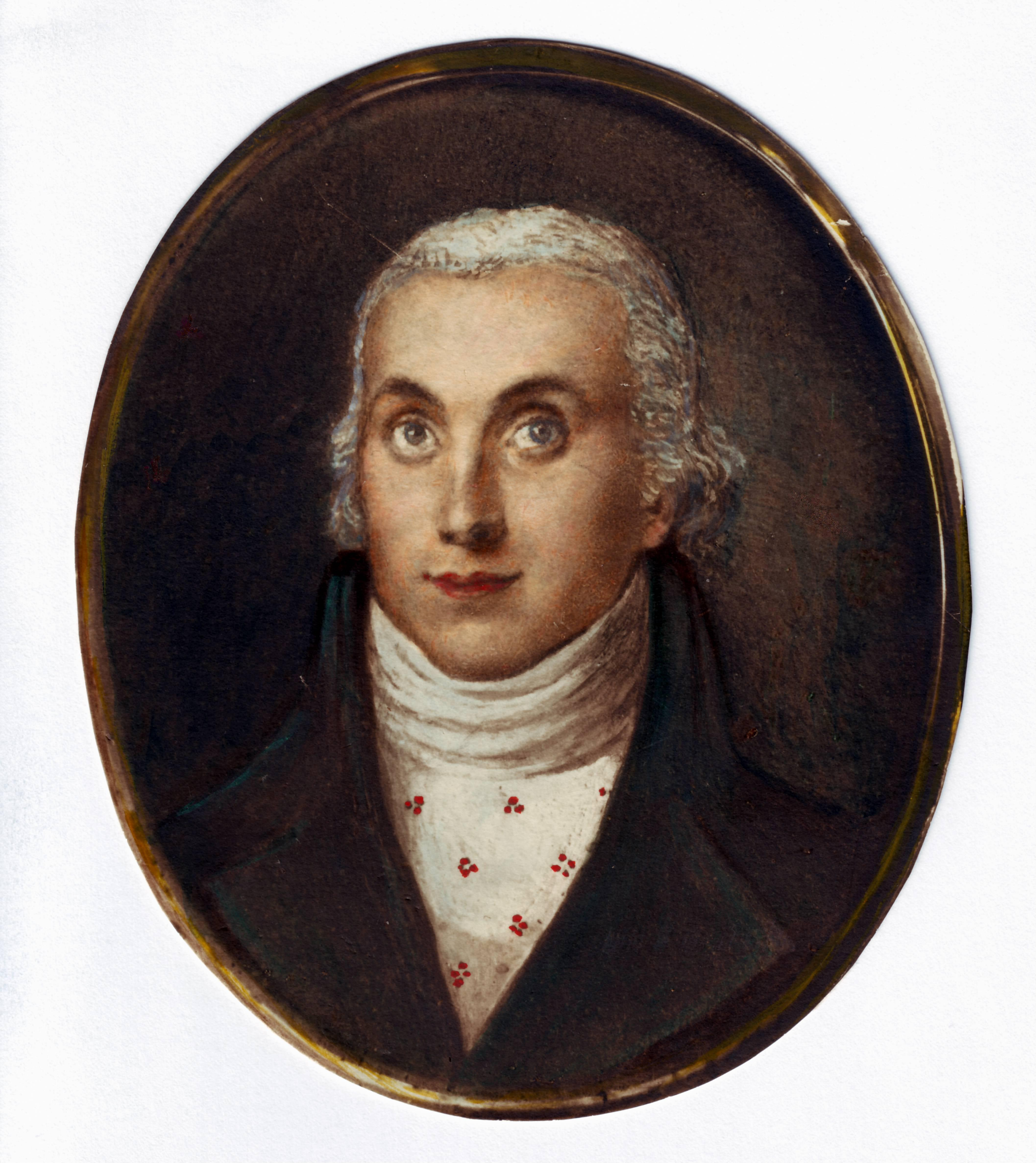
Paul Ludwig Simon

Paul Ludwig Simon, also known as Paul Louis Simon (January 12, 1771 – February 14, 1815), was a German architect and professor at the Building Academy (Bauakademie) in the faculty of architectural physics and a privy architectural counsellor at the Prussian Higher Council of Architecture (Preußische Oberbaudeputation) in Berlin. In the latter position Simon was the predecessor of Karl Friedrich Schinkel. Simon was serving as well as Senior Director of public works for the Marches of Pomerania and Prussia. Beside these fields of activity Simon did – at that time in Europe well known – research work in the field of Electrochemistry and Galvanism. He published different articles on these subjects in German scientific journals – as for example “Annals of Physics” (Annalen der Physik).

== Life ==
Born in Berlin, Simon was a descendant of French Huguenots, who had taken refuge in Brandenburg-Prussia. After a two-year period of training at the Prussian Academy of Arts in October 1789 Simon was hired to serve as a “special director” at the Royal Building Administration (Königliches Oberhofbauamt). In 1791 he was leading the new construction of the Reeve Building (Stadtvogtei) in Berlin as the superior of Friedrich Gilly.

In November 1798 Simon was appointed professor at the Academy of Arts in Berlin and one year later – at the same time of the foundation of the new Building Academy in Berlin – professor in the faculty of architectural physics.

In 1804 Simon joined the Prussian Higher Council of Architecture as a privy architectural counsellor and became senior director of public works for the Marches of Pomerania and Prussia in 1809.

According to family lore Simon accompanied Prussian Queen Luise on her flight from Berlin to Tilsit in October 1806 during the French military occupation of Napoleon in Prussia, as his professional activities afforded him rights of travel that enabled the Prussian queen an inconspicuous passage.

Among other buildings Simon reconstructed the Palais Wilhelmstraße 76 (since 1819 the Prussian Ministry of Foreign Affairs) for the Russian Diplomatic Representative Minister Alopeus in 1805 and the Palais Wilhelmstraße 65 (later the Prussian Ministry of Justice) for Prinz Ferdinand in 1809–1813. During 1809–1811 the new Higher Civil Court (Oberlandesgericht) in Königsberg was built according to Simon’s plans.

As a private architect Simon worked for Elisabeth von Humboldt – the mother of Wilhelm and Alexander von Humboldt – by building the Humboldt family crypt in Falkenberg. Between 1804 and 1806 Simon built the estates and manor houses of Tempelberg and Gölsdorf for the Prussian prime minister Karl August von Hardenberg.

In January 1789 Simon married Marie Madelaine Royer, who was also a descendant of French Huguenots. They had four children. The eldest son Friedrich Louis Simon also became Prussian architect.

Simon died at the age of 44 in Berlin.
