= Lanz, Brandenburg =

Lanz
- Municipality
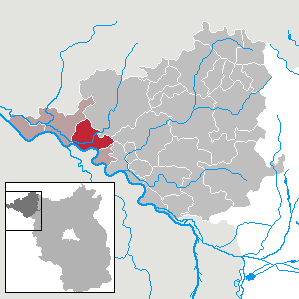
- Location of Lanz within Prignitz district
- Interactive map of Lanz
- Location within Germany Location within Brandenburg
- Coordinates: 53°04′00″N 11°35′59″E
- Country: Germany
- State: Brandenburg
- District: Prignitz
- Municipal assoc.: Lenzen-Elbtalaue
- Subdivisions: 7 Ortsteile

Government
  - Mayor (2024–29): Uwe Tiedemann (CDU)

Area
  - Total: 59.99 km^{2} (23.16 sq mi)
- Elevation: 22 m (72 ft)

Population (2025-12-31)
  - Total: 687
  - Density: 11.5/km^{2} (29.7/sq mi)
- Time zone: UTC+01:00 (CET)
  - Summer (DST): UTC+02:00 (CEST)
- Postal codes: 19309
- Dialling codes: 038780
- Vehicle registration: PR

Lanz is a municipality in the Prignitz district, in Brandenburg, Germany.

== Demography ==
Development of Population since 1875 within the Current Boundaries (Blue Line: Population; Dotted Line: Comparison to Population Development of Brandenburg state; Grey Background: Time of Nazi rule; Red Background: Time of Communist rule)

Lanz: Population development
within the current boundaries (2013)

Year	Pop.	±% p.a.
1875	1,712	—
1890	1,482	−0.96%
1910	1,378	−0.36%
1925	1,388	+0.05%
1933	1,416	+0.25%
1939	1,343	−0.88%
1946	1,932	+5.33%
1950	1,884	−0.63%
1964	1,336	−2.43%
1971	1,308	−0.30%
1981	1,069	−2.00%
1985	1,049	−0.47%
1989	1,054	+0.12%
1990	1,035	−1.80%
1991	1,002	−3.19%
1992	993	−0.90%
1993	988	−0.50%
1994	972	−1.62%
1995	978	+0.62%
1996	962	−1.64%

Year	Pop.	±% p.a.
1997	950	−1.25%
1998	951	+0.11%
1999	932	−2.00%
2000	923	−0.97%
2001	914	−0.98%
2002	897	−1.86%
2003	900	+0.33%
2004	905	+0.56%
2005	896	−0.99%
2006	864	−3.57%
2007	855	−1.04%
2008	852	−0.35%
2009	840	−1.41%
2010	825	−1.79%
2011	804	−2.55%
2012	780	−2.99%
2013	764	−2.05%
2014	766	+0.26%
2015	745	−2.74%
2016	743	−0.27%
