= 1979 New Year Honours =

British royal recognitions

The New Year Honours 1979 were appointments in many of the Commonwealth realms of Queen Elizabeth II to various orders and honours to reward and highlight good works by citizens of those countries. They were announced on 1 January 1979 to celebrate the year passed and mark the beginning of 1979.

The recipients of honours are displayed here as they were styled before their new honour, and arranged by honour, with classes (Knight, Knight Grand Cross, etc.) and then divisions (Military, Civil, etc.) as appropriate.

== United Kingdom and Commonwealth ==
=== Knight Bachelor ===
- Peter Coleman Boon, lately Chairman, Hoover Ltd. For services to Export.
- Lawrence Boyle, Chief Executive, Strathclyde Regional Council.
- John Keyworth Boynton, MC, Chief Executive, Cheshire County Council.
- Derrick Holden-Brown, Vice Chairman, Allied Breweries Ltd.
- Eugene Cross, MBE, MM. For public service in Wales.
- Alastair Robert Currie, Professor of Pathology, University of Edinburgh.
- Professor William Empson. For services to English Literature.
- Moses I. Finley, Professor of Ancient History, University of Cambridge.
- Isaac Hai Jacob, QC, Senior Master of the Supreme Court (Queen's Bench Division) and Queen's Remembrancer.
- Brian Smith Kellett, Chairman, Tube Investments Ltd.
- John Leonard King, Chairman, Babcock & Wilcox Ltd. For services to Export.
- Alan Charles MacLaurin Mackerras, CBE, Conductor.
- Kenneth Mather, CBE, Professor of Genetics, University of Birmingham.
- Frederick William Page, CBE, Chairman and Chief Executive, Aircraft Group, British Aerospace.
- John Joseph Joffre Page, OBE, Chairman, National Ports Council.
- William Drummond Macdonald Paton, CBE, Professor of Pharmacology, University of Oxford.
- James Redmond, lately Director of Engineering, British Broadcasting Corporation.
- Bernard Francis William Scott, CBE, TD, Chairman, Lucas Industries Ltd. For services to Export.
- Walter Stansfield CBE, MC, QPM, CPM, Chief Constable, Derbyshire Constabulary.
- John Nicholas Walton, TD, Professor of Neurology and Dean of Medicine, University of Newcastle upon Tyne.
- Professor John Crossley Wood, CBE, Chairman, Central Arbitration Committee.

Diplomatic Service and Overseas List

- Eric John Ewan Law, Judge of the Court of Appeal, Kenya.

Australian States

State of Victoria

- The Honourable Mr. Justice George Hermann Lush, of Canterbury. For distinguished service to the law.
- Mr. Oscar Gwynne Meyer, OBE, ED, of Toorak. For distinguished service to the State of Victoria.

State of Queensland

- The Honourable William Edward Knox, MLA, Deputy Premier and Treasurer.
- Robert Lyndley Sparkes, of Jandowae. For distinguished services to the State and to local government.

State of Western Australia

- Bruce MacKinlay, CBE, of Dalkeith. For services as President, Confederation of Western Australian Industry and also to the community.

=== Order of the Bath ===
==== Knight Grand Cross of the Order of the Bath (GCB) ====
Military Division

- General Sir Edwin Bramall, KCB, OBE, MC, (277408), Colonel Commandant 3rd Battalion The Royal Green Jackets, Colonel 2nd King Edward VII's Own Gurkha Rifles (The Sirmoor Rifles).

Civil Division

- Sir Ian Powell Bancroft, KCB, Head of the Home Civil Service.

==== Knight Commander of the Order of the Bath (KCB) ====
Military Division

Royal Navy

- Vice Admiral Peter Egerton Capel Berger, MVO, DSC.
- Vice Admiral James Henry Fuller Eberle.

Army

- Lieutenant General Robin Macdonald Carnegie, OBE, (364503), late The Queen's Own Hussars.
- Major General James Michael Gow (278637), late Scots Guards, Colonel Commandant Intelligence Corps.

Royal Air Force

- Air Marshal Alan Cyril Davies, CB, CBE.
- Acting Air Marshal Keith Alec Williamson, AFC.

Civil Division

- Frederick John Atkinson, CB, Chief Economic Adviser, HM Treasury.
- John Wilfrid Bourne, CB, Clerk of the Crown in Chancery, and Permanent Secretary, Lord Chancellor's Office.
- Thomas Chalmers Hetherington, CBE, TD, QC, Director of Public Prosecutions.

Additional Knight Commander

- Major Sir James Rennie Maudslay, KCVO, MBE, Keeper of the Privy Purse and Treasurer to The Queen.

==== Companion of the Order of the Bath (CB) ====
Military Division

Royal Navy

- Rear Admiral Thomas Henry Bradbury.
- Rear Admiral John Roger Southey Gerard-Pearse.
- Rear Admiral Wilfred Jackson Graham.
- Rear Admiral Michael Laurence Stacey.

Army

- Major General David Stanley Appleby, MC, TD, (91843), Army Legal Corps (now Retired).
- Major General Peter Aldcroft Downward, DSO, DFC, (299293), Colonel The Queen's Lancashire Regiment.
- Major General Arthur Michael Lancelot Hogge, (357322), late The Queen's Own Hussars.
- Major General Kenneth Saunders, OBE, (148549), late Royal Army Pay Corps.
- Major General Richard Brooking Trant, (383269), late Royal Regiment of Artillery.

Royal Air Force

- Air Vice-Marshal John Bagot Curtiss.
- Air Vice-Marshal Harry Gill, OBE.
- Air Vice-Marshal Peter Turner.
- Air Commodore Hubert Desmond Hall, CBE, AFC, ADC.

Civil Division

- Robert John Andrew, Deputy Secretary, Home Office.
- Allan Geoffrey Beard, Under Secretary, Department of Health and Social Security.
- Ronald Ernest Bearing, Deputy Secretary, Department of Industry.
- Herbert John Dunster, Deputy Secretary, Health and Safety Executive.
- Michael David Milroy Franklin, CMG, Deputy Secretary, Cabinet Office.
- Eric Frank Hedger, OBE, Under Secretary, Ministry of Defence.
- Martin Wyatt Holdgate, Director General of Research, Departments of the Environment and Transport.
- Samuel Frederick Radcliffe Martin, First Legislative Draftsman, Northern Ireland.
- John Angus Macbeth Mitchell, CVO, MC, Secretary, Scottish Education Department.
- John Howard Nelson, Deputy Secretary, Ministry of Defence.
- Antony Derek Maxwell Oulton, Deputy Secretary, Lord Chancellor's Office.
- Alexander Brown Paterson, Director, Veterinary Laboratories, Ministry of Agriculture, Fisheries and Food.
- Denis Henry Payne, Principal Director, Ministry of Defence.
- Lois Audrey Pittom, lately Under Secretary, Department of Employment.
- William Sinclair Ryrie, Deputy Secretary, HM Treasury.
- George Girdwood Stewart, MC, TD, Commissioner, Forestry Commission.
- John William Weston, Principal Assistant Solicitor, Board of Inland Revenue.
- Richard William Longworth Wilding, Deputy Secretary, Civil Service Department.
- Stanley David Wilks, Chief Executive, British Overseas Trade Board, Department of Trade.

=== Order of Saint Michael and Saint George ===
==== Knight Grand Cross of the Order of St Michael and St George (GCMG) ====
Diplomatic Service and Overseas List

- Sir David Scott, KCMG, HM Ambassador, South Africa.

==== Knight Commander of the Order of St Michael and St George (KCMG) ====
Diplomatic Service and Overseas List

- Sir Sam Falle, KCVO, CMG, DSC, British High Commissioner, Lagos.
- Stanley James Gunn Fingland, CMG, British High Commissioner, Nairobi.
- Arthur Temple Franks, CMG, Foreign and Commonwealth Office.
- Reginald Alfred Hibbert, CMG, Foreign and Commonwealth Office.
- Arthur John Wilton, CMG, MC, HM Ambassador, Jedda.

Australian States

State of Western Australia

- The Honourable Sir Charles Walter Michael Court, OBE, MLA, Premier of Western Australia.

==== Companion of the Order of St Michael and St George (CMG) ====
- Gordon Elliot Myers, Under Secretary, Ministry of Agriculture, Fisheries and Food.
- Rupert George Raw, United Kingdom Director, European Investment Bank.
- Richard John William Rees, Head of Laboratory for Leprosy and Mycobacterial Research, National Institute for Medical Research.
- Ian James Shaw, OBE, Under Secretary, Ministry of Defence.

Diplomatic Service and Overseas List

- Charles Leonard Booth, MVO, HM Ambassador, Rangoon.
- Sydney John Guy Cambridge, HM Ambassador, Kuwait.
- Alan Ewen Donald, HM Ambassador, Kinshasa.
- George Ferguson Finlayson, British Consul-General, Toronto.
- Bertram Anthony Flack, British Deputy High Commissioner, Ottawa.
- Brian Hutchinson, Government Communications Headquarters.
- Derek John Claremont Jones, Secretary for the Environment, Hong Kong.
- John William Denys Margetson, HM Ambassador, Hanoi.
- Peter James Scott Moon, British High Commissioner, Dar es Salaam.
- John Anthony Benedict Stewart, OBE, HM Ambassador, Vientiane.
- Andrew Christopher Stuart, CPM, lately Counsellor, HM Embassy, Jakarta.
- Reginald Robert Temple, Foreign and Commonwealth Office.
- Reginald James Wallace, OBE, Governor, Gilbert Islands.
- Joe Booth Wright, lately HM Ambassador, Abidjan.

Australian States

State of New South Wales

- Keith Ransome Gollan. For service to medicine and the community.

State of Queensland

- Leo John Williams, of Hamilton. For services to the community.

State of Western Australia

- Gordon Barratt Hill, of Claremont. For services to the profession of engineering.

=== Royal Victorian Order ===
==== Knight Grand Cross of the Royal Victorian Order (GCVO) ====
- The Right Honourable Simon, Earl of Dalhousie, KT, GBE, MC.

==== Knight Commander of the Royal Victorian Order (KCVO) ====
- Alfred Lapthorn Blake, CVO, MC.
- The Reverend Canon James Seymour Denis Mansel, MVO.
- Sir Peter Malden Studd, GBE.

==== Commander of the Royal Victorian Order (CVO) ====
- Margery Grace Blackie.
- Vice-Admiral Sir Ronald Vernon Brockman, KCB, CSI, CIE, CBE.
- William John Chalmers, CB, CBE.
- Lieutenant Colonel Alexander Colin Cole, MVO, TD.
- Roger Ivan Mutimer, MVO.
- The Right Honourable James Wogan, Baron Remnant.
- Russell Dillon Wood, MVO, VRD.

==== Member of the Royal Victorian Order (MVO) ====
At this time the two lowest classes of the Royal Victorian Order were "Member (fourth class)" and "Member (fifth class)", both with post-nominal letters MVO. "Member (fourth class)" was renamed "Lieutenant" (LVO) from the 1985 New Year Honours onwards.

Fourth Class

- Carol Elizabeth Barrington Haynes.
- Geoffrey Gowen Collins.
- Christopher Gordon Llewin Cory.
- Major Robert Anthony Gordon Courage, MBE, Grenadier Guards.
- Chief Superintendent Stanley Critchlow, Metropolitan Police.
- Lieutenant Commander Oswald Manuel Blaxland de Las Casas, OBE, Royal Navy (Retired).
- Martin Hynes.
- Surgeon Commander David Askey Lammiman, Royal Navy.
- Captain Michael Henry Tindal Mellish, OBE, ERD.
- Frank Ronald Mintram.
- Jane Napier.
- Surgeon Lieutenant Commander (Temporary) Peter Huntly Robinson, Royal New Zealand Navy.
- Nigel Vinson.
- Commander Leslie Frederick John Walker, QPM, Metropolitan Police.
- Peter Wilson.

Fifth Class

- Keith Alexander Evans.
- Stella Elizabeth Lewis Marks.
- Edith Victoria Martin.
- Laura Joan Maxey.
- Claudia Ann Wyndham Payne.
- Leonard George Perkins.
- Alan Neale Stimson.
- William Worgan Taylor.

==== Medal of the Royal Victorian Order (RVM) ====
In Silver

- Yeoman Bed Goer Charles Blackmore, Her Majesty's Bodyguard of the Yeomen of the Guard.
- Rose Mary Crowe.
- James Forbes.
- Mary Kenny.
- Harry Eric Pashley.
- Chief Petty Officer Steward John Stuart Rhodes, D071137P.
- Ronald Charles Russell.
- William Eric Wickett.
- Chief Marine Engineering Mechanic James Taylor Wightman, D069322N.

=== Order of the British Empire ===
==== Dame Commander of the Order of the British Empire (DBE) ====
Civil Division

- Elizabeth Coker, Chairman, Executive Council, Association of County Councils. For public service.
- Gracie Fields, CBE, (Mrs. Alperovici), Entertainer.
- Naomi Christine James. For services to sailing.

==== Knight Commander of the Order of the British Empire (KBE) ====
Military Division

- Major General Roy Michael Frederick Redgrave, MC, (330640), late The Royal Horse Guards (The Blues).
- Air Marshal Geoffrey Harold Ford, CB, Royal Air Force.

Civil Division

- Robert Hill Kidd, CB, Head of Northern Ireland Civil Service.

Diplomatic Service and Overseas List

- Jack Cater, CBE, Chief Secretary, Hong Kong.

==== Commander of the Order of the British Empire (CBE) ====
Military Division

Royal Navy

- The Reverend John Charles Creber, QHC.
- Captain Peter Keith Corbin Harris.
- Surgeon Commodore John Keeling, QHP.
- Captain William Fergus Moore.
- Captain Stephen Alexander Stuart, ADC.

Army

- Brigadier Gordon Baxter, ADC, (327248), Army Catering Corps.
- Colonel (Local Brigadier) Tony William Alphonse Glenister, TD, (394479), late Royal Army Medical Corps, Territorial and Army Volunteer Reserve.
- Colonel Guy Sydney Hatch, (364744), late Royal Regiment of Artillery.
- Brigadier Egon Bjarne Madsen, (383186), late Intelligence Corps.
- Brigadier Richard James Parker, MC, (303686), late Army Air Corps.
- Brigadier John Richard Roden, MBE, (285838), Colonel The Duke of Edinburgh's Royal Regiment (Berkshire and Wiltshire).
- Colonel James St Clare Simmons, OBE, (414974), late The Royal Green Jackets.

Overseas Awards

- Colonel (Acting Brigadier) Norman Roberts, MBE, (414958), late 10th Princess Mary's Own Gurkha Rifles.

Royal Air Force

- Air Commodore Robert Keith Hooks.
- Air Commodore John Frederick George Howe, AFC.
- Acting Air Commodore Graham Ian Chapman, OBE, AFC.
- Group Captain John Bryan Mitchell, AFC.
- Group Captain Leonard Edward Robins, AE, ADC, Royal Auxiliary Air Force.

Civil Division

- Ronald William Abbott, Deputy Chairman, Occupational Pensions Board.
- John Norman Agate, Consultant Geriatrician, Ipswich and East Suffolk Hospital.
- Derek Michael Anderson. For services to the Cocoa, Chocolate and Confectionery Alliance.
- James Anderson, QFSM, Firemaster, Lothian and Borders Fire Brigade.
- Professor Alick Ashmore, Director, Daresbury Laboratory, Science Research Council.
- Professor Richard John Copland Atkinson. For services to the University Grants Committee.
- Charles George Bennion, lately Chairman, British United Shoe Machinery Co. Ltd.
- Robert Edward Thomas Birch, Solicitor, Metropolitan Police Office.
- Alan Beckett Birt, Consultant Surgeon, Norfolk and Norwich Hospital.
- Lawrence Byford, QPM, HM Inspector of Constabulary.
- James Cameron (Mark James Walter Cameron), Journalist and author.
- Harry Cartwright, MBE, Director, Atomic Energy Establishment, Winfrith, United Kingdom Atomic Energy Authority.
- Edwin George Chandler, Architect and Officer, Planning Corporation of the City of London.
- Edward Conn, Chief Veterinary Officer, Department of Agriculture for Northern Ireland.
- Joseph Arthur Corry, lately Assistant Secretary, Department of Health and Social Security.
- Harold Godfrey De Ville, Executive Vice Chairman, British Insulated Callenders Co. Ltd.
- John Ivor Disley, Vice-Chairman, Sports Council.
- Donald Charles Cassels Dixon, lately Deputy Chairman, Cleveland Bridge & Engineering Co. Ltd.
- Alan James Dowling, OBE, DFC, lately Director, Royal Mint.
- Michael Gascoigne Falcon, Chairman, National Seed Development Organisation Ltd.
- Basil Henry Frank Fehr. For service to the Baltic Exchange.
- Derek Fowler, Member, British Railways Board.
- Hugh Wynell Gamon, MC, Senior Partner, Sherwood & Company, Parliamentary Agents.
- William George Nicholson Geddes, Senior Partner, Messrs. Babtie, Shaw & Morton, Consulting Civil and Structural Engineers, Glasgow.
- Henry Ridyard George, Director Engineer, Department of Energy.
- Ifor Bowen Griffith, MBE. For services to local government in Gwynedd.
- James Turner Griffiths, MC, Chairman, Electronic Consumer Goods Sector Working Party.
- Frederick Otto Grinke, Violinist.
- Alexander MacDonald Hamilton, lately President, Law Society of Scotland.
- John Laker Harley, Professor of Forest Science, University of Oxford.
- Arthur Edward Harvey, Head of Division, Operational Programming Department, Post Office.
- Dennis Alec Head, Managing Director, Aero Division, Rolls-Royce Ltd.
- Sister Francis Ellen Henry (Miss Ellen Henry), lately Principal, Notre Dame College of Education, Glasgow.
- Richard Hermon, Director General, National Council of Building Material Producers.
- William Stephen Holley, General Manager, Washington Development Corporation.
- Kevin Horan, QFSM, Chief Fire Officer, West Yorkshire Fire Brigade.
- Albert Harry Hounsell, Managing Director, Compair International Ltd. For services to Export.
- Robert Andrews Huskisson, Chairman, Hotels and Catering Economic Development Committee.
- Maurice William Jerram, Chairman, United Kingdom Food Distribution Division, Booker McConnell Ltd.
- Benjamin George Jones, lately Chairman, Council for the Welsh Language.
- James Kennedy, Director of Research, The Delta Metal Company.
- Thomas George Kent, Group Director, Dynamics Group, British Aerospace. For services to Export.
- Neil Ripley Ker. For services to palaeography.
- George Alfred Brown King, Managing Director, B.P. Tanker Co. Ltd.
- Edward Ronald Knapp, Managing Director, Timken Europe. For services to Export.
- Oliver Hugh Lawn, lately Assistant Secretary, Department of the Environment.
- Thomas Loftus Townshend Lewis, Consultant Obstetric and Gynaecological Surgeon, Guy's Hospital.
- John Gordon Seymour Linacre, AFC, DFM, Managing Director, Yorkshire Post Newspapers Ltd. For services to Journalism.
- Peter Alan Long, Managing Director, Machine Tools Division, The 600 Group Ltd. For services to Export.
- James Adrian Loring, Director, Spastics Society.
- Moura Lympany, Pianist.
- Eric Alfred Lyons, OBE, Architect.
- Nicholas Cole McClintock, Secretary-General, Order of St. John of Jerusalem.
- Alistair Ian McDonald, Investments Secretary, Church Commissioners.
- William Desmond McKee, lately President, Federation of Building and Civil Engineering Contractors (Northern Ireland) Ltd.
- Romola Mary, Lady Marre. For public service.
- Charles Edwin Merrett. For services to local government in Bristol.
- John Stanley Millar, County Planning Officer, Greater Manchester Metropolitan County Council.
- Charles Ernest Mills, lately Member for Economic Planning, British Gas Corporation.
- Patrick Loudon Mollison, Professor of Haematology, St. Mary's Hospital Medical School, London.
- Gerald James Mortimer, MBE, lately Group Chief Executive, Consolidated Gold Fields Ltd.
- John Allen Cowell Kennedy Nivison, Member of Legislative Council, Isle of Man.
- Leslie O'Connor, Regional Treasurer, South West Thames Regional Health Authority.
- Lawrence William Orchard, TD, Chairman and Chief Executive, Berec Group Ltd. For services to Export.
- Richard Aubrey Padfield, lately Foreign and Commonwealth Office.
- James Francis Pantridge, MC, Professor of Cardiology, Queen's University, Belfast.
- Basil Brockett Parrish, Director, Marine Laboratory, Department of Agriculture and Fisheries for Scotland.
- Bright Harold Piper, Director and formerly Group Chief Executive, Lloyds Bank Ltd.
- James Conrad Douglas Rainbow, Chief Education Officer, Lancashire County Council.
- John Dacre Rigg, Chairman, Organics Division, Imperial Chemical Industries Ltd. For services to Export.
- Derek Robinson, Chairman, Social Science Research Council.
- John Rorke, Managing Director, Offshore Engineering Group, Vickers Ltd., Edinburgh. For services to Export.
- George Clifford Shephard, Board Member for Industrial Relations, National Coal Board.
- Geoffrey Thomas Shepherd, Chairman, Midlands Electricity Board.
- Donald Alfred Sinden, Actor.
- Colin North Smith, Chairman, Policyholders Protection Board.
- Ruskin Spear (Augustus John Ruskin Spear), Artist.
- Cyril Kenneth Spinks, Assistant Secretary, Department of Transport.
- Robert Steel, Secretary-General, Royal Institution of Chartered Surveyors.
- Arthur Edwin Stevens. For charitable services, especially to Jesus College, University of Oxford.
- Alfred John Suich, Assistant Secretary, Department of Industry.
- Arthur Frank Seton Sykes, CVO, Farmer, Wiltshire.
- John Ian Tanner, Director, Royal Air Force Museum, Ministry of Defence.
- Yvonne Avice Dorothy Joan Tough, Senior Lecturer, School of Education, University of Leeds.
- Nigel David Walker, Wolfson Professor of Criminology, University of Cambridge.
- Frank Dixon Ward, Chief Executive, Lambeth.
- Maysie Florence Webb, Deputy Director, British Museum.
- Elsie May Widdowson, Nutritional Research Worker, Medical Research Council.
- Hazel Lilian Wilde, Headmistress, Central High School for Girls, Manchester.
- Frederick John Wilkin, OBE, DFM, Accountant, House of Commons.
- Kenneth Grahame Wilkinson, Engineering Director and Member of the Board, British Airways.
- Gordon Robert Alexander Wixley, OBE, TD, Deputy Chairman, National Biological Standards Board.
- David Woodrow, lately Chairman, Oxford Regional Health Authority.
- Alfred Horace Wright, MC, MM, Chairman, Chemical and Allied Products Industry Training Board.

Diplomatic Service and Overseas List

- Derek Beard, British Council Representative, West Germany.
- Desmond Walter Bloxam. For services to British commercial interests in Zambia and to Anglo-Zambian relations.
- Frank Gutteridge, lately Head of Legal Division, World Health Organisation, Geneva.
- Karl George Donald Lacobiniere. For public services in St. Lucia.
- Fook-wo Li, OBE. For services to the community in Hong Kong.
- Kwee-seong Lo, OBE. For public services in Hong Kong.
- Brigadier Francis Grahame MacMullen, DSO. For services to Anglo-Irish relations.
- Alistair Angus Macaskill. For services to British commercial interests and the British community in Bahrain.
- Michael Morley-John, RD, lately Judge of the High Court, Hong Kong.
- Ernest Stanley Owens, OBE. For services to British commercial interests in Australia.
- John Sholto Herries Skrine, MC. For services to British commercial interests in Malaysia.
- Albert Llewellyn Staine, Puisne Judge, Belize.
- John Sydney Joseph Starkey. For services to British commercial interests in South Africa.
- Major Michael William Stillwell, OBE, MC. For services to the British community in Portugal.
- John Paul Woodhouse Ward, OBE. For services to the development of water and land resources in Nigeria.
- Kenneth Warner. For services to British commercial interests and the British community in India.
- William John Watts, OBE, Counsellor (Commercial) British High Commission, Nairobi.
- Arthur William Edge Wheeler, OBE, Chief Judge, Kaduna State, Nigeria.
- Spencer Frank Willey. For services to British commercial interests in Malaysia.

Australian States

State of New South Wales

- John Anthony Lionel Hooke. For service to industry.
- Professor Harry Messel, Professor and Head of the School of Physics, University of Sydney. For service to education and science.
- Milton Wallace Taylor. For service to primary industry.

State of Victoria

- Henry Krongold, of Melbourne. For service to the community.

State of Queensland

- John Alexander Barton, of Auchenflower. For community services.
- Cecil Krebs Carmody, of Ayr. For service to the sugar industry, the business community and the people of North Queensland.

State of Western Australia

- Robert Inglis Ainslie, DSO, QC, of Crawley. For services to the legal profession.

==== Officer of the Order of the British Empire (OBE) ====
Military Division

Royal Navy

- Commander John Roy Atherton.
- Commander Ilka Erik James Bowles.
- Major Malcolm David Cavan, Royal Marines.
- Commander Herbert Edgar Chappell.
- Commander John Anthony Coleman.
- Commander Thomas Robert Matthew Duke.
- Reverend Thomas Kenneth Hodson.
- Commander John Louden McCann, RD, Royal Naval Reserve.
- Lieutenant Colonel Gerald Frederick Dawson Roberts, Royal Marines.
- Commander John Richard Symonds-Tayler.
- Commander John Norman Underhill.
- Commander John Gavin Wemyss.
- Commander Kenneth Wollan.

Army

- Lieutenant Colonel Anthony Stephen Jeremy Blacker, (461374), Royal Tank Regiment.
- Lieutenant Colonel Derek James Corner, (453458), Royal Regiment of Artillery.
- Lieutenant Colonel Paul John Daly, TD, (419500), Royal Army Medical Corps, Territorial and Army Volunteer Reserve.
- Lieutenant Colonel Roy Eyeions, (470780), Royal Army Medical Corps.
- Lieutenant Colonel (now Acting Colonel) Iain Alexander Ferguson, (424314), Scots Guards.
- Lieutenant Colonel (Staff Quartermaster) Frank Stanley Field, MBE, (452191), The Royal Regiment of Wales (24th/41st Foot) (now Retired).
- Lieutenant Colonel (Acting) Henry Daniel Frampton, (324606), Combined Cadet Force, Territorial and Army Volunteer Reserve.
- Lieutenant Colonel (now Acting Colonel) Lionel Norman Green, (446697), Royal Army Ordnance Corps.
- Lieutenant Colonel Basil Raymond Hobbs, (393173), The Duke of Edinburgh's Royal Regiment (Berkshire and Wiltshire).
- Lieutenant Colonel Lewis William Huelin, (393180), Royal Regiment of Artillery.
- Lieutenant Colonel Ian Kempthorne McKay, (403531), Royal Regiment of Artillery.
- Lieutenant Colonel (now Colonel) Anthony Richard Guy Mullens, MBE, (449016), 4th/7th Royal Dragoon Guards.
- Lieutenant Colonel Peter Stanley Reader, (437146), Royal Corps of Signals.
- Lieutenant Colonel Robert Douglas Upton, (409969), Royal Regiment of Artillery.
- Lieutenant Colonel Cecil Timothy Freeman West, (408077), The Queen's Regiment.
- Lieutenant Colonel Vernon Peter Chase Whitamore, (393966), The Queen's Lancashire Regiment.

Royal Air Force

- Acting Group Captain (now Group Captain) Richard Tom Dixon.
- Wing Commander David Henry Barnes (3519747).
- Wing Commander Timothy William Fane De Salis (58130), AFC.
- Wing Commander George Onslow Graydon (4034118).
- Wing Commander Edwin Thomas John Manning (584341), MBE.
- Wing Commander Peter Gordon Naz (3515759).
- Wing Commander Antony Neale (3129878).
- Wing Commander Roger Hewlett Palin (507462).
- Wing Commander Ivor Darell Pattinson (579960).
- Wing Commander Alan Leslie Murray Rochard (202247), (Retired).
- Wing Commander John Vincent Towey (505476).
- Wing Commander Cyril John Trevains (3035366), MBE.
- Wing Commander Laurence Frank Whittingham (178965), (Retired).

Civil Division

- Lewis Charles Allcock, Engineering Manager, Shell U.K. Exploration & Production Ltd.
- John Piers Allen, lately Principal, Central School of Speech and Drama.
- Percy George Allen, Station Director Grade I, Ministry of Agriculture, Fisheries and Food.
- John Woolven Anderton, VRD, Director, Wildfowlers' Association of Great Britain and Ireland.
- Herbert Frank Andrews, General Manager, Gallaher Ltd., Northern Ireland.
- William Albert Ankers, Principal, Department of Employment.
- Mildred Agnes Archer, Foreign and Commonwealth Office.
- Anthony Armstrong, QPM, Chief Constable, Bedfordshire Police.
- Eric Bainbridge, Director, British Ports Association.
- Alexander Young Balfour, Senior Inspector of Taxes, Board of Inland Revenue.
- Denis Phillips Barritt, Secretary, Belfast Voluntary Welfare Society.
- James Simpson Beattie, MM, QPM, Deputy Chief Constable, Lothian and Borders Police.
- John James Beattie, Head of Science Division, Science Research Council.
- Robert Beckham, Managing Director, SPD Distribution Ltd.
- David Stark Binnie, General Manager, London Midland Region, British Rail.
- William Percy Blair, Member, Executive Council, Electrical, Electronic, Telecommunication and Plumbing Union.
- Edward Hamer Boot, MM, Chairman, Joint Safety Administration Committee, Yorkshire Safety Training Centre for the Construction Industry, Leeds.
- Barry Frank Boyden. For services to Rugby Football.
- Edgar Leonard Bradley, Chairman, Legal Committee, Magistrates' Association.
- Peter Leonard Charles Brazier. For services to the Road Haulage Association in Kent.
- Michael Sladen Colborne Brown, Education Officer, Royal National Institute for the Blind.
- William Arthur Bryars, Regional Engineer, Mersey Regional Health Authority.
- Janet Helen Burgess, lately District Nursing Officer, Wessex Regional Health Authority.
- Lieutenant Commander Gilbert John Harries Burrington, Royal Naval Reserve., lately Chairman, Post Office Users' Council for Wales.
- John Bury, Associate Director (Design), National Theatre.
- Alfred Butler, QFSM, Chief Fire Officer, Surrey Fire Brigade.
- Joyce Cadbury, President, Birmingham Association of Youth Clubs.
- Maurice James Grove Cahalan, Head, Research Department, Rio Tinto-Zinc Corporation.
- Professor John Bernard Caldwell, Head of School of Marine Technology, University of Newcastle upon Tyne.
- Ralph Carr, Vice-Chairman, Cumbria Area Health Authority.
- Douglas Hornsby Carrack, Superintending Grade Civil Engineer, Department of the Environment.
- George Arthur Cathcart, Chairman, Fire Authority for Northern Ireland.
- Brunswick Cedric Charles Cawrse, Principal Professional and Technology Officer, Ministry of Defence.
- Francis William Cheetham, Director, Norfolk Museums Service.
- Leonard Allcock Clarke, President, Nottinghamshire Area, National Union of Mine workers.
- Philip Annett Coggin, Headmaster, Park Senior School, Swindon.
- William Prior Cole, Director of Quality Engineering, GEC-Marconi Electronics Ltd.
- Basil Richard Coney, Vice-President, Devon and Cornwall Rent Assessment Panel.
- Susie Cooper (Susan Vera Barker), Design Director, Susie Cooper Ltd.
- Eileen Alice Mary Coram, National Chairman, National Union of Townswomen's Guilds.
- Margaret Nancy Cornish, Senior Inspector, Primary Schools, Nottinghamshire Local Education Authority.
- George William Crawford, Chairman, National Federation of Fishermen's Organisations.
- Thomas Michael Cronin, National Secretary, Docks and Waterways Group, Transport and General Workers Union.
- Euphemia Crowe, lately Deputy Headteacher, High Southwick Junior School, Sunderland.
- William Frederick Cusworth, Director-General, North West Region, Central Electricity Generating Board.
- Michael Hague Dale, General Medical Practitioner.
- James Davidson, lately Manager, Kelvin Hall, Glasgow.
- Peter Deavin, MC, County Surveyor, Norfolk County Council.
- John Albert Dellow, Deputy Assistant Commissioner, Metropolitan Police.
- Professor Ivey Dickson, Musical Director, The National Youth Orchestra of Great Britain.
- Geoffrey Herbert Dix, Secretary-General, The Institute of Bankers.
- John Archibald Donaldson, Editor, British Dental Journal.
- Denis Dooley, HM Inspector of Anatomy, Department of Health and Social Security.
- Sheila Mary Ross Dronfield. For services to the community in York.
- Clulow Riba Lillah Dugdale, Director, Powys Branch, British Red Cross Society.
- Ronald Francis Hamilton Anson Duncan, RD, Senior Operations Executive, Commonwealth Development Corporation.
- John Hughes Dunlop, Principal, Northern Ireland Office.
- Albert John Dunn, lately Member, London Borough of Croydon Council.
- Harry Norman Eccleston, Artist Designer, Bank of England.
- Courtenay Edwards, Motoring Correspondent, Sunday Telegraph.
- Charles Dale Falconer, Scottish Secretary, British Medical Association.
- James Mayfield Fetherston, Chief Executive, Thomas Meadows International Ltd.
- Commander Rodney Simon Flynn, Royal Navy, lately Sub-Treasurer, The Honourable Society of the Inner Temple.
- John Stuart Forbes, Deputy Warden and Assay Master, Worshipful Company of Goldsmiths of London.
- Sheila Edith Fraser, General Medical Practitioner, Bristol.
- Thomas Fulton, lately Councillor, Strathclyde Regional Council.
- Leslie Arthur Gane, Clerk to the Justices, Newcastle upon Tyne.
- Paul Elford Garbutt, MBE, Chief Secretary, London Transport Executive.
- George Cock Gibson. For charitable services.
- Arthur Goldthorpe, Chairman, Leeds Branch, British Polio Fellowship.
- Stephen Gortvay, Chairman, Spark Plug Division, Smiths Industries Ltd. For services to Export.
- John James Graham, Headteacher, Anderson High School, Lerwick, Shetland.
- John Gratwick. For services to the Clothing Economic Development Council.
- Doris Griffiths, Member, Clwyd County Council.
- Iris Hall, lately District Nursing Officer, Cleveland Area Health Authority.
- Margaret Hemsley Handyside, National Chairman, Women's Section, Royal British Legion.
- John Robertson Hare, Actor.
- Roland St. George Tristram Harper, TD. For service to the National Association of Boys' Clubs.
- John Neill Harris, MC, Deputy Chairman, IPC Business Press; Chairman, Agricultural Press Ltd.
- James Stanley Heaton. For services to the English Industrial Estates Corporation.
- Dennis Hebden, Programme Director, Westfield Development Centre, British Gas Corporation.
- William Cecil Hepworth, Senior Inspector, Board of Customs and Excise.
- James Herriot (James Alfred Wight), Author.
- John Nelson Hewitson, lately Headmaster, Eaton School, Norwich.
- Nancy Maureen Hickey, Area Nursing Officer, Coventry Area Health Authority.
- William Arthur Higgs, lately Chairman, Board of Visitors, HM Prison, Preston.
- Stanley Campbell Hilditch, Prisons Administration, Northern Ireland Office.
- Clara Hinchliffe, Headmistress, Handsworth Wood Girls' School, Birmingham.
- Charles Anderson Hinks, lately Member, Law Reform Committee.
- John Hamilton Holden, Chairman, Creative and Performing Arts Board, Council for National Academic Awards.
- Frances Cicely Hollinghurst, Assistant Education Officer (Catering), Liverpool Education Authority.
- John Lapworth Holt, Director, Jack Holt Ltd. For services to Export.
- Hettie Ceridwen Hopkins, lately Secretary, Welsh Board of the Royal College of Nursing.
- Kevin Hughes, Chairman, GEC Medical Equipment Ltd.
- George Humphreys, Headmaster, Coleraine Academical Institution.
- William Furlonger Hunt, Head of Fleet Personnel Division, P & O Steam Navigation Co. Ltd.
- John Charles Ireland, MBE, ERD, lately Director of Trade Relations and Projects, Plessey Telecommunications Ltd. For services to Export.
- Alexander Jack, Senior Principal, Ministry of Defence.
- Gordon Cameron Jackson, Actor.
- Ralph Anderson Jackson. For service to the Boys' Brigade.
- Clifford William Jones. For services to Rugby Football in Wales.
- Llewelyn Jones, lately Headmaster, Dyffryn Conwy School, Llanrwst.
- John Stanley Keates, Senior Lecturer in Cartography, University of Glasgow.
- Henry Walter George Kendall, Director, British Printing Industries Federation.
- Sarkis Nazareth Kurkjian. For services to the Armenian community.
- John William Richard Lamb, Member, Executive Council, Scottish Federation of Meat Traders' Associations.
- John Alexander Reid Lawson, General Medical Practitioner, Dundee.
- Hubert Brian Leake, Town Clerk and Chief Executive, Tamworth District Council.
- William Rowland Lee. For services to the promotion of the English Language abroad.
- Leonard Lees. For services to the water industry and to local government in Mansfield.
- George William Leonard, DFC, Wing Representative Chairman, East Essex Wing, Air Training Corps.
- Margaret Elizabeth Lindars, Area Nursing Officer, Buckinghamshire Area Health Authority.
- Jacques Kenneth Lion, Senior Partner, Philipp & Lion Ltd.
- Glyndwr Kenneth Lockyer, QFSM, Chief Fire Officer, Leicestershire Fire Brigade.
- Douglas Stanley Love, Managing Director, EMI-MEC Ltd. For services to Export.
- Barbara Mary Lovell, Technical Adviser, Ministry of Defence.
- Mary Lund, General Secretary, Independent Television Companies Association.
- Norman Alexander MacCaig, Poet.
- Hamish MacInnes, BEM. For services to Mountaineering and Mountain Rescue in Scotland.
- Anne Margaret Mackie (Mrs. Davies). For services to industrial relations.
- Olive Lilian Mann. For services to Adult Literacy.
- Peter Martin, General Secretary, Hampshire Council of Community Service.
- James Cooksey Mason, Regional Secretary, Birmingham and West Midlands, General and Municipal Workers' Union.
- Lieutenant Colonel Edward Michael Koecher Mead, TD, Chairman, Avon Local Councils Association.
- Henry Bradshaw Mercer, lately Member, Northern Ireland Industries Development Advisory Committee.
- David Eryl Meredith, Senior Consultant Physician, North Clwyd Hospitals.
- John Stephen Milne, Adviser in Art and Design Education, Grampian Regional Council.
- Thomas Russell McDougall Milne, Chief Executive, Tay Valley Housing Association Ltd.
- Marjorie Elizabeth Monks, County Youth and Community Adviser, Staffordshire Local Education Authority.
- Alan Reginald Moody, Member, Shipbuilding Industry Training Board.
- Frank James Moon, lately Governor, HM Prison, Jersey.
- Major Ronald Edwin Moore, Secretary, Derbyshire, Soldiers', Sailors' and Airmen's Families Association.
- Neville Morley, Superintending Grade Engineer, Home Office.
- Anthony Joseph Morrison, Principal, Board of Inland Revenue.
- Derek Raymond Moyland, Managing Director, Firth Cleveland Steel Strip Ltd. For services to Export.
- Raymond Alan Neve, Senior Principal Scientific Officer, Department of Hops Research, Wye College, Ashford, Kent.
- George Richard Newbery, Radiological Safety Controller, Physics Department, Radiochemical Centre Ltd.
- Pauline Lilian Newnes, Director, Northamptonshire Branch, British Red Cross Society.
- Philip Frederick Nind, TD, Director, Foundation for Management Education.
- George Howard Orchard, Shipyard Manager, Scotts' Shipbuilding Co. Ltd.
- Allan William Panario, Principal Professional and Technology Officer, Department of Prices and Consumer Protection.
- Thomas Neill Pearce, TD. For services to Sport and particularly to Cricket and to Rugby Football.
- Mollie Doreen Phillips. For public service in Wales.
- Reginald John Phillips. For services to the Young Men's Christian Association.
- Leonard Vincent Pike, MBE, Chairman, Midland Electricity Consultative Council: Chairman, West Midland Transport Users' Consultative Committee.
- Frederick David John Pinto, General Manager, BRE-Metro Ltd. For services to Export.
- Robert William Porter, MBE, Director, Eastern Region, National Federation of Building Trades Employers.
- Mary Potter (Marian Anderson Potter), Artist.
- John Pringle. For service to the National Schizophrenia Fellowship.
- Jack Proctor, District Postmaster, Western District Office, London Postal Region.
- Reginald Charles Rainey, lately Senior Principal Scientific Officer, Ministry of Overseas Development.
- Ralph Rawlinson, Director, South Midlands Area, National Coal Board.
- James Laidlaw Redpath, Managing Director, Barrie Knitwear Ltd., Hawick. For services to Export.
- Eric Charles Reed, DFC, Director of Operations, Thames Water Authority.
- Donald Frank Rees, Chairman, William F. Rees Ltd.
- Arthur Capel Roberts. For services to Lawn Tennis.
- Alexander Robertson, MBE, Managing Director, Hugh Smith (Glasgow) Ltd. For services to Export.
- John Downie Robertson, MC, Deputy Keeper of the Registers of Scotland.
- Norman Frank Thomas Robinson, lately Assistant Chief Constable, Ministry of Defence.
- Daniel Ronald Ross, lately General Manager, Parke Davis Company, Pontypool.
- Frederick George Rowe. For services to the community in Dorset.
- Maldwyn Jones Rowlands, Senior Principal Scientific Officer, British Museum (Natural History).
- George Gordon Savage, Secretary, Tayside Health Board.
- Arthur Irwin Scott, Company Secretary, British Nuclear Fuels Ltd.
- Frederick Burt Secrett, Horticulturist and Chairman, Rosewarne Experimental Horticulture Station Advisory Committee.
- Michael Joseph Slevin, MBE, Assistant Chief Constable, Royal Ulster Constabulary.
- Ronald Jesse Smith, Principal, Department of Industry.
- Georgina Margaret Stafford, lately Assistant Chief Probation Officer, Inner London Probation and After-Care Service.
- Erie George Steele, Member, St. Edmundsbury Borough Council.
- Tommy Steele (Thomas Hicks), Entertainer and Actor.
- Charles Gordon Taylor, QPM, Chief Constable, Norfolk Constabulary.
- Frank Taylor (John Frederick Taylor), Senior Sports Writer, Daily Mirror.
- John Henry Gladstone Tegan, Principal, Department of Transport.
- Frederick Gilbert Stanley Thomas, Architect. For services to Liverpool Cathedral.
- Howell Henry Beaumont Morris Thomas, lately Senior Principal Scientific Officer, Ministry of Defence.
- John Moran Tulley, Rector, Our Lady's High School, Motherwell.
- Catherine Mary Walsh (Sister Barbara), Headmistress, St. John's School for the Deaf, Boston Spa, Wetherby.
- Jack Lionel Ward, Chairman, English Vineyards Association.
- Andrew Webster, London Editor, United Newspapers.
- Joyce Gladys Whitehead, Deputy Chief Nursing Officer, Department of Health and Social Security.
- Leonard Melville Williams, Treasurer, Lothian Health Board.
- Peter Firmston-Williams, Managing Director, ASDA Stores Ltd.
- Charles Douglas Wills, Secretary, St. Dunstan's.
- James Elliott Wilson, Chairman, Trustee Savings Bank of Northern Ireland.
- Gordon Wilyman. For services to agriculture in Wales.
- Sylvia Frances Wright, MBE, Headquarters Administrator (Areas), Women's Royal Voluntary Service.

Diplomatic Service and Overseas List

- The Reverend Canon Ronald Edward Adeney. For services to the community in Jerusalem.
- Jacobo Azagury. For services to art and the community in Gibraltar.
- Francis Eustace Baker, Administrative Secretary, British National Service, New Hebrides Condominium.
- Joseph Batty. For services to British commercial interests in Canada.
- Alfred Dennis Beesley. For services to British commercial interests and the British community in Ghana.
- The Reverend Joyce Mary Bennett. For services to education and the community in Hong Kong.
- Robin Thomas Hendley Bennett. For services to the British community in Libya.
- William Boyd Berry. For services to vocational training in developing countries.
- Philip Dalton Brewer. For services to British commercial interests and the British community in Saudi Arabia.
- Major Geoffrey Caiger-Watson, MC. For services to Anglo-Nigerian relations.
- Shou-lum Chen. For services to commerce and the community in Hong Kong.
- Edmund Kendall Clark, Principal Agricultural Officer, Malawi.
- Marian Clay, lately First Secretary (Aid), HM Embassy, Jakarta.
- William Manasseh Connor. For services to the community in St. Kitts-Nevis-Anguilla.
- Hamish Copland. For services to British commercial interests and the community in Venezuela.
- John Eugene Cox. For services to the British community in Oman.
- George Frederick Charles Crisp. For services to the British community in Lyons.
- Louis Scott Cruikshank. For services to British commercial interests in Pakistan.
- Saville Carlyle Cummings. For public services in St. Vincent.
- Philip Dale, lately Chief Secretary, Turks and Caicos Islands.
- Howell Davies, MBE. For services to the development of tsetse control in Nigeria.
- Peter Lewis Morgan Davies. For services to British commercial interests and the British community in Zambia.
- Wilfred John Davis. For public services in Bermuda.
- Frank Victor Dobson, MBE. For services to the British community in Argentina.
- Vernon Roy Dougall. For services to the British community in Buenos Aires.
- Spurgeon Andrew Ebanks. For public services in the Cayman Islands.
- Arthur Carleton Evelyn. For services to the community in St. Kitts-Nevis-Anguilla.
- Clement Anthony Fitzherbert, Honorary British Vice-Consul, Vitoria, Brazil.
- Charles John Gulliford. For services to British marine interests in Saudi Arabia.
- Dennis Gunton, Assistant Education Adviser (Libraries), British Council, New Delhi.
- John Michael Gregson Halsted, lately Regional Representative, British Council, Karachi.
- Sheila Eanswythe Harden, MBE, First Secretary, United Kingdom Mission to the United Nations, New York.
- Hari Naroomal Harilela. For services to the community in Hong Kong.
- Edward Taylor Henry, Permanent Secretary, Ministry of Barbuda Affairs, Antigua.
- Tim Ho. For services to the community in Hong Kong.
- Peter Frederick Victor Howard. For services to British commercial interests and the British community in Paris.
- Norman Hearst Hunter. For services to commerce in Belize.
- Peter Malcolm Jones. For services to technical education in Nicaragua.
- Captain Hugh Anthony Kidd, DSO, DSC, Royal Navy (Retd). For services to Anglo-Cameroonian relations.
- William Archibald Theodore King, Permanent Secretary, Ministry of Education, Antigua.
- Bobbie Madelaine Florence Kotewall, MBE. For services to education in Hong Kong.
- Ronald Leybourne. For services to the British Community in Aden.
- Edith Barbara Wethered Luke, lately First Secretary, HM Embassy, Hanoi.
- John Doveton Brennan McKibbin, First Secretary, HM Embassy, The Hague.
- Arthur Francis Markham. For services to higher education in India.
- John Marriott. For services to the community in Uruguay.
- Arthur Stirling Maxwell Marshall, First Secretary (Commercial), HM Embassy, Kuwait.
- Winifred Peggy Marjoribanks. For welfare services to the community in Malaysia.
- Donald Austin Marston, First Secretary, HM Embassy, Beirut.
- George Robert Mathison. For services to British commercial interests in Belgium.
- Jim William Moffatt, First Secretary and Head of Chancery, British High Commission, Maseru.
- David Goldschmid Montefiore. For services to medical education in Nigeria.
- Mary Agnes Parczewski, MBE. For services to English education in Argentina.
- Douglas Breed Pickersgill, British Council Representative, Denmark.
- Donald Pragnell, First Secretary and Head of Chancery, HM Embassy, Muscat.
- Lawrence Robert Stanley Price. For services to British commercial interests in Belgium.
- John Alfred Radford. For services to the British community in Bangladesh.
- Jean Muriel Reddaway. For services to Anglo-Polish relations.
- Iain Robert Richardson. For services to British commercial interests in Oporto.
- Frederick Geoffrey Robinson. For services to the British community in Paraguay.
- Arthur John Rodgers. For services to English education in Kuwait.
- John Other Roe. For services to the British community in Lausanne.
- George Arthur Romeril, First Secretary (Consular), British High Commission, Nicosia.
- John Albert Sandys. For services to agricultural development in Central Africa.
- Hugh Maxwell Scott. For services to the development of sheep farming in Colombia.
- John Desmond Seed. For services to British commercial interests and the British Community in Saudi Arabia.
- Clive Kelday Smith, lately British Council Representative, San'aa, Yemen Arab Republic.
- Thomas Smith. For services to the development of education in Nigeria.
- Jean Crawford Inglis Sowa. For medical services to the community in The Gambia.
- Kenneth Warrender Swann. For services to British interests and the British community in Beirut.
- Eric Jellicoe Tavares. For services to the development of sugar production in the Caribbean.
- Ata Taremon Teaotai, Secretary to the Chief Minister, Gilbert Islands.
- Garth Cecil Thornton, QC, Solicitor-General, Hong Kong.
- Rowena Adelaide Vining, MBE, lately HM Consul, British Consulate, Florence.
- Betty Bennet Wells. For medical services to the community in St. Lucia.
- James Rennie Wilson. For services to the British community in Antwerp.
- Alfred Charles Seymour Wright. For services to the development of agriculture in Belize.

Australian States

State of New South Wales

- Ian Morton Armstrong. For service to primary industry.
- James Theodore Aroney. For service to medicine and the ethnic community.
- Leon Parmeter Carter. For service to local government.
- Professor Malcolm Chaikin, Dean of the Faculty of Applied Science, University of New South Wales. For service to education and the community.
- Ailsa Mavis Hill. For service to women and the community.
- Phillip Vincent Lopez. For services to the community.
- William Patrick Maker. For service to tourism.
- Edna Sirius Roper. For parliamentary and trade union service.
- Sidney Sinclair. For service to commerce and industry.
- The Very Reverend Monsignor John Francis Slowey. For service to religious education.
- Gordon Frederick Webster. For service to the motor industry.

State of Victoria

- The Honourable Archibald Keith Bradbury, of Wangaratta. For service to the Parliament of Victoria.
- Ralph Leyton Cooper, of North Balwyn. For service to commerce and industry.
- Reginald Harry Ebbott, of Toorak. For service to the arts.
- Keith Thomas Henry Farrer, of Blackburn. For service to science and industry.
- Leo John Murphy, of Hawthorn. For service to special education.
- Francis James Sheehan, of Kew. For service to the real estate industry.
- Nellie Louise Stephenson, of Mont Albert. For service to hospital administration.
- Ivan Wade, of Kew. For services to the meat industry.
- Carmen Winter, of Toorak. For community service.

State of Queensland

- The Reverend Father Vincent James Carroll, of Kingaroy. For services to the Catholic church.
- William Colin James Cormie, of Ascot. For service to the Royal Queensland Society for the Prevention of Cruelty and to the dental industry.
- Councillor Colin Philip Marshall, of Monto. For service to local government and the community.
- Fred Thomas Matthews (Snr.) of New Farm. For services in the field of fire protection.
- Alderman Nellie Elizabeth Robinson, Mayor of the City of Toowoomba.
- Councillor Allister Carle Shepherdson, of Biloela. For service to local government and primary industry.

State of Western Australia

- Sydney Douglas Corser, of Mount Pleasant. For services to commerce.
- Theodore John Kannis, BEM, of City Beach. For services to the community.
- Jacob Jack Krasnostein, of Mount Lawley. For services to the economy and the community.
- William John Lucas, of Nedlands. For services to health education, the community and yachting.

==== Member of the Order of the British Empire (MBE) ====
Military Division

Royal Navy

- Lieutenant Commander (SCC) Cyril Denis Bartlett, Royal Naval Reserve.
- Fleet Chief Control Electrical Artificer Graham David Stanley Bowden, M887618F.
- Lieutenant Commander James Adair Bradley.
- Captain (SD) David Malcolm Crook, Royal Marines.
- Fleet Chief Cook Andrew Hogg, M840312H.
- Lieutenant (CS) Robert James Kennedy.
- Lieutenant Commander (SD) David Bernard King.
- Lieutenant (SD) David George Lemon.
- Lieutenant Commander Hugh Brian McConway, RD, Royal Naval Reserve.
- Lieutenant Commander (SD) Arthur John Phillips.
- Acting Lieutenant Commander (SD) David John Hugh Richardson.
- Lieutenant Commander Alexander McKellar Sinclair.
- Lieutenant Commander Frederic Gladwyn Thompson.
- Lieutenant Commander Ronald Charles Weale.
- Lieutenant Commander (SD) Joseph Whiteside.

Army

- Major Victor Charles Abplanalp (327970), The Queen's Regiment.
- Captain (Quartermaster) Gordon Ivor Amphlett, MVO, (490806), The Royal Regiment of Wales (24th/41st Foot).
- Major John Edmund Stuart Armstrong (470015), Royal Corps of Transport.
- Major Ian Michael Murray Bagshaw (479917), Royal Army Medical Corps.
- 22207480 Warrant Officer Class 1 Bruce Stanley Baxter, Royal Army Pay Corps (now Discharged).
- Captain (Acting Major) Stephen Blanche (490077), The Royal Irish Rangers (27th (Inniskilling) 83rd and 87th).
- 23573531 Warrant Officer Class 1 James Muir Bunton, Scots Guards.
- Reverend William Gray Burns, Chaplain to the Forces Fourth Class (Acting Chaplain to the Forces Third Class) (103348), Royal Army Chaplains' Department, Territorial and Army Volunteer Reserve.
- Lieutenant Colin Albert Bush (505826), Corps of Royal Electrical and Mechanical Engineers.
- Major Basil Allen Carlston (475844), The Queen's Regiment.
- 22815322 Warrant Officer Class 1 Adrian David Cowley, Royal Tank Regiment.
- Major (Quartermaster) Allan Davison, TD, (470709), The King's Regiment, Territorial and Army Volunteer Reserve.
- 22299064 Warrant Officer Class 2 David George Dyer, Royal Regiment of Artillery, Territorial and Army Volunteer Reserve.
- Captain David Robin Earle (493477), Royal Army Pay Corps.
- Major Gopalbahadur Gurung (477765), 6th Queen Elizabeth's Own Gurkha Rifles.
- 22619290 Warrant Officer Class 2 William Gunn, 51st Highland Volunteers, Territorial and Army Volunteer Reserve.
- Captain (Quartermaster) Jack Hall (490172), The Royal Regiment of Fusiliers.
- W/397037 Warrant Officer Class 2 Mary Margaret Hemmings, Women's Royal Army Corps (now Discharged).
- Major John Hoskins (483490), Royal Regiment of Artillery.
- 23525487 Warrant Officer Class 1 David Mortimer House, Corps of Royal Military Police.
- Captain (Acting Major) Michael James Hyslop, TD, (479544), The Royal Regiment of Fusiliers, Territorial and Army Volunteer Reserve.
- Major George David Gower Isaac (418298), The Royal Regiment of Wales (24th/41st Foot).
- Captain (Staff Quartermaster) John Henry Jenkinson (493590), Royal Army Ordnance Corps.
- Major (Quartermaster) Roy Jenns (485177), The Royal Anglian Regiment.
- 23481142 Warrant Officer Class 1 William Miller Kerr, Royal Corps of Signals (now Discharged).
- Major Derrick John Locke (431836), Royal Corps of Transport.
- Major (Staff Quartermaster) John Dermidy Douglas McGowan (476192), Royal Regiment of Artillery.
- Major Neil Duncan McIntosh (455056), The Green Howards (Alexandra, Princess of Wales's Own Yorkshire Regiment).
- Major Douglas Moorehead, TD, (310947), Royal Army Pay Corps, Territorial and Army Volunteer Reserve.
- Major Michael Burke Mounde (475662), Corps of Royal Engineers.
- Major Michael John Nicholson (479307), Royal Regiment of Artillery.
- 22988005 Warrant Officer Class 1 Michael Edmund O'Callaghan, Army Catering Corps.
- 23776331 Warrant Officer Class 1 Maxwell Williams Pratt, 51st Highland Volunteers, Territorial and Army Volunteer Reserve.
- Captain Leslie Alan Ramsden (495862), The Gloucestershire Regiment.
- Major Wilfred Rousell (289674), The Staffordshire Regiment (The Prince of Wales's) (Retired).
- Major (Quartermaster) Brian William Fraser Sharman (488330), The Parachute Regiment.
- Captain (Acting Major) Philip John Smyth (489803), Corps of Royal Military Police.
- Captain (Quartermaster) John Grieve Turner (490183), Royal Corps of Signals.
- Major Geoffrey George Conway White (400111), Corps of Royal Electrical and Mechanical Engineers.
- Major David MacLennan Whitfield (489079), Royal Army Medical Corps.
- 22297427 Warrant Officer Class 2 Charles Cecil Wicker, The Royal Yeomanry, Territorial and Army Volunteer Reserve.
- Major (Quartermaster) Dennis Arthur Joseph Williams (485027), 14th/20th King's Hussars.

Overseas Awards

- Major Benjamin William Faulkner (481767), Corps of Royal Military Police.
- Major Noshir Pheroz Pavri, ED, Royal Hong Kong Regiment (Volunteers).

Royal Air Force

- Squadron Leader Antony John Hamilton Alcock (4232267).
- Squadron Leader Terence Robert Bilton (4175269).
- Squadron Leader John Goodall (573975).
- Squadron Leader Gerald Patrick Hynes (4244212).
- Squadron Leader Robin Edward Holloway (2507582).
- Squadron Leader Stanley Wilfred Keyte (4231391).
- Squadron Leader James Edward McLoughlin (4009654), BEM, RAF Regiment.
- Squadron Leader Duncan Ian McTavish (586345).
- Squadron Leader Richard James Milsom (608378).
- Squadron Leader William Purchase (506051).
- Squadron Leader Anthony Peter Singleton (4335291).
- Squadron Leader Peter Dulvey Stonham (3127345).
- Squadron Leader Donald Frederick Wimble (1864239).
- Acting Squadron Leader Christopher Davison (5201001).
- Flight Lieutenant Robert Douglas Bone (1803877).
- Flight Lieutenant Edward Burge (190115), AE, Royal Air Force Volunteer Reserve.
- Flight Lieutenant Alistair Sinclair McKelvie (1924877).
- Flight Lieutenant David John Sturt Marchant (2620878).
- Flight Lieutenant Timothy James Pink (5201961).
- Flight Lieutenant Roger Piper (683755).
- Flight Lieutenant Derek Charles Tilford (2620880).
- Flight Lieutenant Ronald Williams (4012947), (Retired).
- Acting Flight Lieutenant Patrick Joseph Desmond Walton-Smith (206059), Royal Air Force Volunteer Reserve (Training Branch).
- Warrant Officer Lloyd William Brewer (T4089692).
- Warrant Officer Desmond Stanley Buller (E0575444).
- Warrant Officer Vincent Mervyn Jackson (N0553902).
- Warrant Officer Rowland Charles Alexander Morris (M4001320).
- Warrant Officer Albert Edward Silsby (P1921225).
- Warrant Officer Barrie Swales (L4130606).

Civil Division

- Evelyn Andrea Adams, Head of Remedial Education, Newlands School, Workington.
- Reginald George Adams, Head, Engineering Production and Services Department, South East London College.
- Ernest Arlington. For services to the National Association of Boys' Clubs in Buckinghamshire.
- Alfred William Alcock, Senior Executive Officer, Department of Health and Social Security.
- George Eric Deacon Alcock. For services to Astronomy.
- James Cecil Alderman, lately Safety Engineer, South of Scotland Electricity Board.
- Gwenfra Mary Amor. For services to the community in Bletchley and district.
- Margaret Fleck Anderson. For services to the community in Belfast and to Christian Aid.
- Tommy Francis Appleby, Manager, Manchester Opera House.
- Albert Archer, Environmental Officer, City of Birmingham.
- Walter Archer, Senior Process Supervisor, Risley Laboratories, United Kingdom Atomic Energy Authority.
- Lily Atkins, Secretary, Standing Conference of London Arts Councils.
- Eric Atkinson, Member, Yorkshire Water Authority.
- Robert Vincent Atkinson, Deputy Station Superintendent, Hinkley Point "A" & "B" Nuclear Power Stations, Central Electricity Generating Board.
- Eric Bailey, Proprietor of Pharmacy, Ashford, Middlesex.
- David Martin Hiatt Baker, Chairman, Bristol and District Disablement Advisory Committee.
- Jennifer Louise Banbury, Headmistress, Lillian de Lissa Nursery School, Birmingham.
- Harry Bancroft, Chief Maintenance Officer, Redditch Development Corporation.
- Peter Barber, Area Personnel Officer, Derbyshire Area Health Authority.
- George Barker. For services to Music in Essex.
- James Stanley Barlow, lately Senior Executive Officer, Department of Health and Social Security.
- Etty Elizabeth Barnes. For services to the community in Gloucestershire.
- John Sydney Barnes, Partner, Abbey Horn Works. For services to Export.
- Edward Beckett, Inspector (Higher Grade), Board of Inland Revenue.
- Hugh Begg. For services to East Kilbride New Town.
- Eric Alfred Bellars, Fire Service Officer I, Hong Kong, Ministry of Defence.
- Sarah Bennion. For service to disabled people in Heywood.
- Edward David Berman, Founder Director, Inter-Action Trust Ltd.
- Ann Handley Bird, Leader, Heath House, Young Ornithologists' Club.
- Evelyn May Bishop, Higher Executive Officer, Manpower Services Commission.
- Nora Blacklock, Superintendent, Metropolitan Police.
- Eric Blackmore, Superintendent of Works, East Anglia Territorial Auxiliary and Volunteer Reserve Association.
- Margaret Wood Blake, Organiser, Northampton Citizens' Advice Bureau.
- Roy Blythen, lately Director, Broadcast Equipment Division, EMI Industrial Electronics Ltd.
- William Boyd. For services to Music in Northern Ireland.
- Harold Bradshaw, Deputy Chief Executive, British Electrical and Allied Manufacturers' Association.
- Margaret Nora Braithwaite. For services to Medau Gymnastics.
- Sidney James Brearley, Head, School of Printing, Southfields College, Leicester.
- Malcolm Brodie, Sports Editor, Belfast Telegraph.
- Margaret Brodie, Local Officer I, Department of Health and Social Security.
- Willem Broekhuizen, Engineering Manager, Training Simulators Group, Military Systems Division, Ferranti Ltd. For services to Export.
- James Francis Clifford Brown, Secretary, Norfolk Community Bus Committee.
- Kenneth Locke Brown, Managing Director, J. Compton Sons & Webb Ltd.
- Desmond Browne, Superintendent, Royal Ulster Constabulary.
- Wilfred James Bryan. For services to the Royal British Legion in Dyfed.
- Geoffrey Leonard Bull, Project Team Leader (Data Processing), BP Oil Ltd.
- Rowland James Bull, District Secretary, North Wales, Amalgamated Union of Engineering Workers.
- Ronald Richard Burnhams, Chief Superintendent, Metropolitan Police.
- Kenneth Burrows, Nursing Officer, Liverpool Area Health Authority.
- Captain Barclay Godfrey Buxton, MC. For services to the Officers' Christian Union.
- Johanna Cadogan, lately Higher Executive Officer, Ministry of Defence.
- Ann Castel Calder, Senior Executive Officer, Department of Employment.
- Elsa Mary Carroll. For services to the community in Manchester.
- Charles Stanley Carter, Area Supplies Officer, St. Helens and Knowsley Area Health Authority.
- Pratul Chandra Chakravarti, Principal Community Relations Officer, Birmingham.
- Mary Ann Charles, Member, Afan District Council, West Glamorgan.
- Neville Gordon Chinn. For services to the League of Friends, Royal Liverpool Children's Hospital.
- Margaret Haggart Brown Chisholm, Teacher, Drummond School, Inverness.
- Roger Albert Clarke, Motor Rally Driver.
- Olive Clarke, Member, North West Transport Users' Consultative Committee. For public service in Cumbria.
- William Thomson Cloy, Member, Dumfries and Galloway Health Board.
- Lieutenant Commander Anthony John Cobham, GC, Royal Navy (Retd.). For services to the Scout Association in Hampshire.
- Douglas Peter Coelho, Executive Officer, Department of Employment.
- Stanley Collinson, Colliery General Manager, Rockingham Colliery, Barnsley Area, National Coal Board.
- Captain Hector Connell, Master Mariner. For services in connection with the rescue of Vietnamese refugees.
- Philip Thomas Conroy, Headteacher, St. Leonard's Roman Catholic Primary School, Sunderland.
- Kenneth John Cooper. For services to disabled people in Lowestoft.
- Kenneth Cordner, BEM, Chief Superintendent, Royal Ulster Constabulary.
- Arnold Walmsley Cresswell, Senior Scientific Officer, Ministry of Defence.
- Audrey Daniel, Divisional Nursing Officer, West Glamorgan Health Authority.
- David Thomas Davies, District Secretary, West Wales, Transport and General Workers Union.
- Nathaniel Day. For service to the theatre.
- Olga Mary Day, Controller of Typists, Board of Inland Revenue.
- Ann Minnie Bromley-Derry. For services to Education.
- John Doherty, Senior Executive Officer, HM Stationery Office.
- Muriel Alice Patricia Downes. For services to the Cordon Bleu Cookery School.
- William Hubert Doxey, Member, West Derbyshire District Council.
- Peter East, Warden, Tower Hill Hostel and Community Centre, Toc H.
- John Oliver Eatough, Managing Director, Eatoughs Ltd. For services to Export.
- Thomas Edwards. For services to agriculture in Wales.
- John Reade Emanuel, Headteacher, High Wych Junior, Middle and Infants School, Sawbridgeworth.
- Margaret Alicia Engleheart, lately Secretary, Canning House Economic Affairs Council Ltd. For services to Export.
- Hubert Glendore English, Member, Leeds Community Relations Council.
- David Trevor Enoch. For services to local government and the community in Dyfed.
- Charles Arthur Neatherton Evans, lately Superintendent, Physiology Department, University College, University of London.
- Edith Evans, District Midwife, Surrey Area Health Authority.
- Irene Fellows, Member, Alyn and Deeside District Council.
- Timothy Maynard Scott Ferguson, Deputy Chief Test Pilot, Warton Division, Aircraft Group, British Aerospace.
- Charles Edwin McDermott Fletcher, Inspector of Taxes, Board of Inland Revenue.
- Joan Fletcher, lately Mayor's Secretary, Maidstone Borough Council.
- Nora Vanda Morley-Fletcher, General Secretary, British Council for Aid to Refugees.
- John Alexander Forbes, BEM, Managing Director, A. B. Chalmers (Inverness) Ltd.
- Joseph William Ford, Senior Executive Officer, HM Treasury.
- Frank Fordham. For services to the Citizens' Advice Bureau in Bury St. Edmunds.
- Clifford James Foxlee, Company Secretary, Eastern Counties Omnibus Co. Ltd.
- Nesta Helene Lobbett Franklyn (Mrs. Cox), Teacher, String Instruments, Avon Local Education Authority.
- Albert Grant Fraser, General Medical Practitioner, Aberdeen.
- Alistair Fraser, Field Officer, Livestock Improvement Services, Meat and Livestock Commission.
- Frederick William Gallimore, lately Higher Scientific Officer, Ministry of Defence.
- Thelma Gant, Headteacher, Dalton Foljambe Infants' School, Rotherham.
- John Alexander Gibson, Inspector (Higher Grade), Board of Inland Revenue.
- John Henry Giles. For services to Squash Rackets.
- Elizabeth Alice Gilkes, Personal Secretary, Lancashire County Council.
- Richard George Goldsmith, Scientific Officer, National Physical Laboratory.
- Anthony George Gordon, Executive Director, Imported Meat Trade Association.
- Hedley Herbert Gore, lately Secretary General, Luton and District Chamber of Commerce and Industry.
- Thomas Herbert Gore, Regional Manager, Northern Ireland, Navy, Army and Air Force Institutes.
- Louise Bernice Gray. For services to the community in Totnes.
- Dorothy Murray Brown-Greaves, lately Nursing Officer, Suffolk Area Health Authority.
- Jack Green, Senior Executive Officer, Department of Health and Social Security.
- Margaret Olwen Griffith, lately Head of Poultry Department, Northamptonshire College of Agriculture.
- Lieutenant Colonel Robert Jacob Griffith, MC, lately Foreign and Commonwealth Office.
- Fred Fawcett Guddat, lately Higher Executive Officer, Ministry of Defence.
- Charles Douglas Hall, Higher Executive Officer, Office of the Director of Public Prosecutions.
- Arthur Richard Hambly, Group Export Sales Executive, Montfort (Knitting Mills) Ltd. For services to Export.
- Margaret Irene Hamilton. For services to health and safety at work.
- William Hamilton, Works Manager, John G. Kincaid & Co. Ltd.
- George William Hancock, Valuation Clerk (Higher Grade), Board of Inland Revenue.
- Leslie Charles Hannay, Chief Operations Manager (Guided Weapons Contracts), British Aerospace Dynamics Group. For services to Export.
- Mary Elizabeth Hanson, lately Principal, Holy Cross Girls' Primary School, Belfast.
- Trevor Harries, lately Divisional Officer Grade I, West Glamorgan Fire Brigade.
- William Henry Harris. For services to industrial relations in Northern Ireland.
- Edward Charles Hartley, Member, Stoke Poges Parish Council.
- Kathleen Annie Hawkey. For services to the Girl Guides' Association in Oxfordshire.
- Leonard James Hawksworth, Chairman, Halesowen and District Society for Mentally Handicapped Children.
- Robert Anthony Hayes, Administrative Manager, Mersey Mill, Bowaters United Kingdom Paper Co. Ltd.
- John James Heffernan, Divisional Nursing Officer, Essex Area Health Authority.
- William Higgins Henry. For services to the community in Clackmannanshire.
- Joyce Ottoline Hensman. For services to blind people in Boston and Spalding.
- Margaret Emma Hewit, Joint Chairman, Wrexham Supplementary Benefit Appeal Tribunal.
- Douglas Hewitson, Assistant Works Manager, D. Wickham & Co. Ltd. For services to Export.
- Andrew Peter Hewitt, Senior Marketing Manager, Racal Tacticom Ltd. For services to Export.
- Leonard Hill. For services to the community in Abertillery.
- Colin Shaw Hilton, Higher Executive Officer, Board of Customs and Excise.
- Jenny Urquhart Himsworth, lately Health Visitor, Dalkeith.
- Leonard Thomas Hodson, lately Community Development Officer, Scunthorpe Borough Council.
- Frederick Fortescue Hollis, Member, Brighstone Parish Council, Isle of Wight.
- Catherine Holmes. For services to the elderly in Normanton, West Yorkshire.
- Margaret Eleanor Cedergren Holt, Community Nursing Sister, Hertfordshire Area Health Authority.
- John Roland Caleb Honor, Deputy Chief Clerk, West London Petty Sessional Court.
- Leslie Hornsby, Quality Control Manager, Engineering Group, Michell Bearings, Vickers Ltd.
- John Stark Hoskins. For services to Motor Cycle Speedway Racing.
- Idris Howells, Mining Engineer, British Rail.
- Alice Gwendoline Howlett. For services to occupational health nursing.
- Eric Herbert Lancelot Hughes, BEM, Manager, New Projects, British Aerospace, Riyadh.
- Adam Brown Allan Hunter. For services to the community in Midlothian.
- Norman Victor Jackson, Medical Records and Statistics Adviser, South Western Regional Health Authority.
- Fred Jacques, Member, Cleveland County and Hartlepool Borough Councils.
- Derfyl John, Personnel Manager, Port Talbot Works, British Steel Corporation.
- Hilda Mary Rose Johnson, Organising Secretary, Meals on Wheels Service, Jersey.
- Rita Pauline Johnson. For services to elderly and physically disabled people in Stoke-on-Trent.
- Evelyn Joyce Jones, lately Personal Secretary, Essex Police.
- John St. David Jones, QPM, Deputy Chief Constable, North Wales Police.
- Lorna Gertrude Jones, Area Administrator, Oldham Area Health Authority.
- John Judd, Chairman, Hampshire and Isle of Wight Agricultural Wages Committee.
- Frank Kenneth Keene, County Emergency Planning Officer, Somerset County Council.
- Pamela Keily. For services to religious drama in the North of England.
- Margaret Mary Kelly. For services to Swimming.
- Grizel Kinloch Ker, President, Dumfriesshire Branch, British Red Cross Society.
- Kathleen Blanche Kinahan, Member, Board of Visitors, HM Prison, Armagh.
- Dennis George King. For services to the conservation and restoration of stained glass.
- Margaret Patricia King, Tax Officer, Higher Grade, Board of Inland Revenue.
- Norman Hamilton King, Assistant Chief Engineer, Independent Television News.
- Captain Edgar James Kirton, Dock and Harbour Master, Southampton, British Transport Docks Board.
- Helen Mary (Elma) Laing, Assistant to Secretary-Accountant, Royal Incorporation of Architects in Scotland.
- Catherine Laird, Senior Social Worker, Belvoir Park Hospital, Belfast.
- Jane Killoh Lamb, Personnel and Welfare Officer, British Fish Canners (Fraserburgh) Ltd. For services to Export.
- William Frederick Lancefield, Higher Executive Officer, Home Office.
- Arthur George Lange, lately Senior Executive Officer, Department of Health and Social Security.
- Sonia May Lannaman. For services to Athletics.
- Mabel Alice Larkin, BEM, Principal Fire Control Officer, Lancashire Fire Brigade.
- Janet Kathleen Laughton. For services to Paraplegic Sport.
- Albert Leach, Managing Director, Ballymoney Manufacturing Co. Ltd.
- Frederick Martin Leech, Senior Supervisor, Automobile Association.
- John Robert Leighton, lately Works Director (Keighley Plant), Hayward Tyler Ltd. For services to Export.
- George Ernest Leslie, Divisional Organiser (Engineering Section), Edinburgh and Fife, Amalgamated Union of Engineering Workers.
- Bernard William Lewis, Managing Director, Drury Engineering Co. Ltd.
- Gwynfryn John Lewis, Chief Buyer and Supplies Manager, Production Division, Decca Radar Ltd.
- Hilary Hale Leyshon, Chief Superintendent of Typists, Welsh Office.
- Harold Symons Linnard, lately Senior Scientific Officer, Ministry of Defence.
- Russell Granville Lloyd, Stores Controller, Department of Engineering, University of Cambridge.
- Michael Long, MC, District Officer, Forestry Commission (Scotland).
- Genevieve Watkin Lord. For service to the community in Scarborough.
- Eileen Luchi, Public Duties Officer, County Down Branch, British Red Cross Society.
- James Lugton, General Medical Practitioner, Edinburgh.
- Thora Annie Douglas MacCalman, Senior Rent Officer, Scottish Office.
- James McDonagh, Senior Executive Officer, Department of Health and Social Security.
- Robert Gillies MacDonald, Special Assistant Teacher, Allan Glen's Secondary School, Glasgow.
- Margaret McDonough, Senior Accountant, Royal Air Forces Association.
- Lillian June McElnea, Sister, Hospital for Sick Children, Great Ormond Street.
- Robert Ross McGimpsey, Chief Superintendent, Royal Ulster Constabulary.
- Robert Glen Edwards McKell, Headteacher, Dens Road Primary School, Dundee.
- The Reverend Joseph Ross McLaren, Manager, Lanthorn (Community Ecumenical Centre), Livingston.
- Donald George McMillan, Vehicle Quality Manager and Chief Engineer, Marshall of Cambridge.
- Denis Owen Maggott, Engineering Services Manager, Nuclear Power Co. (Whetstone) Ltd.
- Harold Gordon Makins, Seminar Co-ordinator, National Cash Registers Ltd.
- Noel Percy Mander, Master Organ Builder.
- Ellen Mann, lately Higher Executive Officer, Ministry of Defence.
- James Marks, Manager, Wire and Nail Department, John Williams (Wishaw) Ltd.
- Laurence Wyndham Marks, Executive Officer, Metropolitan Police Office.
- Agness Maureen Marr, lately Staff Officer, Department of the Environment for Northern Ireland.
- John Martin, General Secretary, National Union of Lock and Metal Workers.
- Captain Peter Harry Mattocks, Master, Esso Petroleum Co. Ltd.
- Thomas Megahy, lately Member, Kirklees Metropolitan Borough Council.
- Irene Midgley, Senior Collector of Taxes, Board of Inland Revenue.
- Ada Mary Miles, Relief Sister, Horsell Lodge, Woking, The Church Army.
- Winifred May Millar. For services to the teaching of Lace Making.
- Betty Muriel Millard, President, National Federation of Old Age Pensioners' Associations.
- George Dallas Miller, Principal Ophthalmic Optician, Glasgow Western Group Hospitals.
- Frederick William Millett. For services to Cricket.
- Agnes Elizabeth Millichap, Deputy Head, Church Stretton Primary School, Salop.
- Olive Irene Mitchell, Manager, Beckery Centre for the Mentally Handicapped, Glastonbury, Somerset.
- James West Moir, Conductor, Glasgow Caledonian Strathspey and Reel Society.
- Duncan Huelen Richards Moody, Member, Tendring District Council.
- Walter Bernard Moore, Chairman, Adullam Homes Housing Association.
- Peter Moxom, Senior Training Assistant (Workshops), London Transport Executive.
- Marjorie Winifred Mudge. For services to nursing.
- Mary Bertranda Mulryan (Sister Bertranda), Headteacher, St. Rose's Infants School, Boxmoor.
- Henry Nivet, Principal, Henderson Technical College, Hawick.
- David Evelyn Nye, Architect.
- Arthur James Ormond, Editor, Tenby Observer.
- Denis Stanley Osborn, Senior Auditor, Exchequer and Audit Department.
- Albert Owen, General Manager, North West Region, Trustee Savings Bank.
- Alexander Winter Patterson, Senior Lecturer, Department of Pharmacy, Heriot-Watt University, Edinburgh.
- Robert Hunter Patton, Chief Education Social Worker, Education Department, Sheffield.
- Kenneth George Pearn, lately Senior Executive Officer, Ministry of Defence.
- Albert Henry Peters, BEM, Principal Doorkeeper, House of Commons.
- Edward Charles Pinney, Senior Nursing Officer, Oxfordshire Area Health Authority.
- Miriam Elisabeth Plummer, Senior Occupational Therapist, Bethlem Royal Hospital and the Maudsley Hospital.
- Joyce Pollard, Nursing Officer, Kent Area Health Authority.
- Robert Pollock, Assistant Managing Director, William Bain & Co. (Structural) Ltd., Coatbridge. For services to Export.
- John Potts, lately Higher Executive Officer, Department of Employment.
- Reginald Alfred Gregory Powell, Assistant Division Officer, Ordnance Survey.
- Samuel Robert Douglas Power, Chief Mechanical and Electrical Engineer, Paddington, British Rail.
- Richard Prasher. For services to the environment in the West of. Scotland.
- Albert William John Pusey, Member Slough Borough Council.
- Charles Quant. For public services in Clwyd.
- Edward Joseph Quinn, Senior Executive Officer, Board of Customs and Excise.
- Winifred May Reed, lately Senior Executive Officer, Department of the Environment.
- Alfred Gordon Reilly, Freelance Journalist, Stirling.
- Robert Gwynedd Richards, lately Higher Executive Officer, Department of Health and Social Security.
- Gwendolen Phyllis Richardson, Centre Organiser, Cumbria Branch, British Red Cross Society.
- Patrick Martin Robertson, Director of Environmental Health, Clackmannan District Council.
- Thomas Oswald Robson, lately Works Engineer, Engineering Group, Scotswood Works, Vickers Ltd.
- Albert Roebuck, Chief Executive and Clerk, South Staffordshire District Council.
- Geoffrey Glencross Rogers, TD, lately Consultant Partner, Donaldson & Sons.
- Patricia Alice May Ruck, County Organiser, Kent, Women's Royal Voluntary Service.
- Ethel Lillian Craig Runnette, Deputy Principal, Department of Agriculture for Northern Ireland.
- Richard Rutherford, General Manager and Principal Adjuster, Marine Claims, Lloyd's Underwriters' Claims and Recoveries Office.
- William George Sansom. For service to the community in Bexhill on Sea.
- Francis Lilian Scandrett, Office Supervisor, Western Division, West Midlands Metropolitan Ambulance Service.
- Bernard Henry Scarlett, Chief Crime Reporter, Press Association.
- Roberta Elizabeth Seath, Teacher, Perth High School.
- Alastair Frank Sangster Seaton, Chief Superintendent, Tayside Police.
- Edgar Mervyn Sharp, lately Senior Executive Officer, Lord Chancellor's Department.
- Kathleen Mary Sheard, Women's Royal Voluntary Service Representative, Royal Army Pay Corps Apprentices College.
- Edwin Sheldon, Public Relations Officer, Tees Area, Northern Region, British Gas Corporation.
- Joyce Winifred Shellard, Senior Executive Officer, Department of Transport.
- Evelyn Murdoch Sillars, Member, Cunninghame District Council.
- Alexander Sim. For services to the Royal British Legion in Scotland.
- Isobel Larmour Sim, Assistant Head Teacher, Pollokshields Primary School, Glasgow.
- Kenneth Robert Simmonds. For service to young people in Gloucestershire.
- Osmond Paul Simmons, lately Area Education Officer, South East Hampshire.
- Allan Cyril Simpson, Technical Director, International Distillers and Vintners' Home Trade Ltd. For services to the wine and spirit trade.
- John Simpson, Probation Officer, Avon Probation and After-Care Service.
- Denise Sims, Headmistress, St. James Norland School, London.
- Richard Smallwoods, General Manager, Welch Margetson & Co. Ltd.
- David Smith, Fishing Skipper.
- Lieutenant-Commander Eric Leonard Smith, Royal Naval Reserve, Chairman, Dagenham and Romford Unit, Sea Cadet Corps.
- Gerald Howard Smith, Formerly Senior Executive Officer, Civil Service Department.
- Leonard Walter Smith. For services to lighterage in the Port of London.
- Norman William Smith, Member, North Warwickshire Borough Council.
- Jessie Bertha Katie Smout, Secretary, Tottenham and Wood Green Divisions, Soldiers', Sailors' and Airmen's Families Association.
- Edward Frederick Somers, Assistant County Director, Buckinghamshire, St. John Ambulance Brigade.
- Margaret Haig Stein, Higher Executive Officer, Board of Inland Revenue.
- Stanley Llewelyn Stennett. For services to entertainment and to charities.
- Ian Stewart. For services to Athletics.
- Peggy Eastwood Stockdale, Senior Executive Officer, Department of Trade.
- Patricia Gladys Stokoe, Assistant Company Results Manager, National Carriers Ltd.
- Douglas Storer, Senior Executive Officer, Department of Employment.
- Joan Robina Straker, Personnel Services Controller, North Eastern Co-operative Society Ltd., Gateshead on Tyne.
- Nathan Strang. For services to riding for disabled people.
- Peter Lawrence Stuckey, Higher Executive Officer, Northern Ireland Office.
- Leslie Margaret Swain, Clerical Officer, Department of Health and Social Security.
- Horace Henry Swannick, Marketing Director, Western British Road Services Ltd.
- William Talbot. For services to youth in Wigan.
- Trevor Angus Charles Tatchell. For services to the Royal National Institute for the Blind for Wales.
- Brenda Harris Taylor, Director Residential, British Property Federation.
- Mabess Annie Templar. For services to the Citizens' Advice Bureau in Cwmbran.
- Harry Arthur Thomas, Assistant Editor, Oxford Mail.
- Kenneth Elliott Thompson, Group Standards Manager, Alcan Aluminium (U.K.) Ltd.
- Christiaan Rudolph Truter, Clerical Officer, Department of the Environment.
- William Ernest Tucker. For services to the community in Colchester.
- Edward Tuff, Manager, Terminal 2, Ground Operations London, British Airways.
- Dennis Albert Turner, Professional and Technology Officer Grade II, Ministry of Defence.
- Herbert Samuel Turner, Playleadership Organiser, Parks Department, Greater London Council.
- Frank Tyson, Chief Designer, Scottish Division, Aircraft Group, British Aerospace.
- Adrian James Van Riemsdyk, Senior Scientific Officer, Department of Energy.
- Alan Newman Wackett, Officer, Board of Customs and Excise.
- Alwyn Mary Ward, Leader, Young Adventurers' Club, Hampstead, London.
- Elizabeth Warren, Superintendent, James Clydesdale House, Newcastle upon Tyne.
- Douglas Arthur Webb, Tourist Facilities Manager, British Tourist Authority.
- Robert Radford Welch, Designer and Silversmith.
- Edward Charles West, VRD, Senior Executive Officer, Department of Health and Social Security.
- Philip Charles Weston, Agricultural Advisory Officer, Grade III, Ministry of Agriculture, Fisheries and Food.
- Walter Wharton, Training Services Officer Grade I, Department of Employment.
- Peter Whitaker, Products Development Manager, Francis Shaw & Co. Ltd.
- Jonah Whitehouse. For service to the community in Tipton, West Midlands.
- Harold Thomas Williams, Local Officer I, Department of Health and Social Security.
- Ivy Clare Williams, Higher Executive Officer, Ministry of Agriculture, Fisheries and Food.
- Mark Aquilla Augustus Wills, lately Professional and Technology Officer Grade I, Ministry of Defence.
- Leonard Wilton Winder, lately Assistant Registrar, Royal Institute of Chemistry.
- Sylvia Ann Mary Winterbottom, Sister, Bolton Area Health Authority.
- William Albert Wiseman, lately Graphics Officer I, Department for National Savings.
- Alfred James Witherington, District Organiser, National Union of Agricultural and Allied Workers.
- Alfred John Woodcock, County Secretary, Northumberland, National Farmers' Union.
- Olive Emily Wright, BEM, lately Regional Co-ordinator, Emergency Services, West. Midlands, Women's Royal Voluntary Service.
- Rosa Louisa Wright, Higher Executive Officer, Home Office.
- Reginald Stanley Wyatt, President, South West Export Association. For services to Export.
- Lawrence Victor Yorke, Superintendent, General Services, Heathrow Airport, British Airports Authority.
- William Young, District Secretary, Hanley, Transport and General Workers Union.

Diplomatic Service and Overseas List

- Beatrice Mary Allen de Acosta. For services to English education in Colombia.
- Hudson Baptiste Ambrose, Chief Establishment Officer, Antigua.
- John Rowland Ashton. For services to the teaching of English in Sweden.
- Shiu-man Au-Yeung, Law Clerk, Attorney General's Department, Hong Kong.
- William Bett Stewart Bain. For services to British commercial interests in Zambia.
- Rupert Barry Baldock, lately Commercial Officer, HM Embassy, Asuncion.
- Jean Fletcher Smith Bastien. For services to the community in St. Lucia.
- Elsie (Liz) Beanland. For services to English Education in Qatar.
- Joan Elizabeth Bell. For services to the British community in Jedda.
- Nora Louise Bilgorai, Librarian, Information Section, HM Embassy, Paris.
- John Barker Blockley, Education Assistant, British Council, Amman.
- Margaret Joyce Brown, Honorary Curator, Shelley Museum, Lerici, Italy.
- David Edgar Burnett, lately Attache, HM Embassy, Hanoi.
- Ismay Almyra Burt. For services to the community in St. Kitts-Nevis-Anguilla.
- Derrick Forrest Butterfield, Education Officer, British National Service, New Hebrides Condominium.
- Ann Pauline Hester Cantrell, Personal Secretary to Political Adviser, Hong Kong.
- Hazel Elisabeth Eaves Caren. For nursing and welfare services to lepers in Sudan.
- Roy John Carter, lately Second Secretary (Commercial), HM Embassy, Tehran.
- Tsung-han Chen, Senior Housing Manager, Housing Department, Hong Kong.
- Eng-kuan Cheng. For services to the community in Hong Kong.
- Alexander Louis Dotto, Vice-Consul, British Consulate, Ceuta.
- John Harold Fisk. For welfare services to disabled people in the Bahamas.
- Charles Edward Fouracres. For services to the British community in Cannes.
- Yue-keung Fung, Senior Chinese Language Officer, Home Affairs Department, Hong Kong.
- Paul Albert Garbarino, Clerk to the House of Assembly, Gibraltar.
- Lunita Garson. For welfare services to the community in Gibraltar.
- Dennis Edward Gould. For services to English education in Stockholm.
- Lydia Rose Haley, Secretary, Commercial Department, HM Embassy, Washington.
- Desmond William Tom Harding. For services to technical development in Korea.
- Gladys Muriel Hickman, BEM. For welfare services to the British community in Paris.
- Brenda Nyasa Hobrow. For nursing and welfare services to the community in Malawi.
- Renate Susanne Holmes, Vice-Consul (Commercial), British Consulate-General, Frankfurt.
- Mohamed Hussain, Consular Clerk, HM Embassy, Doha.
- Alma Millicent Iton. For welfare services to the community in St. Vincent.
- Errey Bernard John. For services to education in St. Vincent.
- James Rhodri Herbert Jones. For services to the teaching of English in Japan.
- Frederick Charles Joseph. For services to the community in St. Lucia.
- Nicholas Astell Kaye. For services to the British community in Malaga.
- Clifford George Watts Kerswill, Superintendent, Customs and Excise Service, Hong Kong.
- Margaret Lillian Lowe. For services to the British community in Argentina.
- Ruth Eleanor McLaughlin, Matron, Health Department, Cayman Islands.
- Stuart Macpherson, Second Secretary (Administration), HM Embassy, Bonn.
- David Laughton Mathews, Senior Education Officer, Malawi.
- Roger Derek Milchem, Travel and Reception Officer, British High Commission, New Delhi.
- Stella Joan Miles, Telephone Supervisor. HM Embassy, Rome.
- Angeles Josephine Montado. For services to education in Gibraltar.
- Tom Murdoch, Marine Superintendent, Shipping Corporation, Gilbert Islands.
- Henriette Clementine Murphy. For services to the British community in Antwerp.
- Frederick Stuart Needham, Vice-Consul (Commercial), British Consulate-General, Cape Town.
- Kirkland Hencliff Nixon, Chief Fire Officer, Cayman Islands.
- Vivienne Elizabeth Nnoka, Secretary, Supreme Court, Nigeria.
- John Wynne Owen, lately Second Secretary (Information), HM Embassy, Tehran.
- Keith Holland Parker. For sporting and social welfare services to the community in the Bahamas.
- Ruth Emily Parks. For nursing and welfare services to the community in Jerusalem.
- John Edward Payne, lately P.S.A. Representative, HM Embassy, Tehran.
- June Patricia Pickford, Personal Assistant to Financial Secretary, Hong Kong.
- John Richard Ralph Stockwell Pitchford, Senior Assistant Secretary, Ministry of Health. Gilbert Islands.
- Jessie Eleanor Porritt, lately Head of English Section, Languages Division, United Nations, Geneva.
- Dorothy Prenafeta. For services to the British community in Barcelona.
- Charles Robin. For services to British commercial interests in Vietnam.
- Hilda May Rosado. For services to the community in Belize.
- Luther Sarkis Salakian. For services to education in Cyprus.
- Ian Howard Sercombe. For welfare services to the community in St. Helena.
- Kitty Hon-sum Siu. For welfare services to the community in Hong Kong.
- Sybil Suzanne Skelton, Vice-Consul, HM Embassy, Berne.
- Edward Adamson Skinner. For services to British commercial interests in Iran.
- Thomas Kenneth Smart. For services to British commercial interests in Sarawak, Malaysia.
- Cecil George Smith. For services to music in Bermuda.
- Kenneth Mazzini George Stephenson, VRD, lately Archivist, British High Commission, Nicosia.
- Mary Bonus Stimson. For nursing and welfare services to the community in Nigeria.
- James Claude Stocks. For services to technical development in Dominica.
- William Gordon Swansbury. For welfare services to disabled people in Kenya.
- Raghupathi Kasinath Tagat, Assistant Administration Officer, British Deputy High Commission, Madras.
- Mary Louise Tallon. For services to the British community in Argentina.
- Mote Teraoi, CPM, Assistant Commissioner of Police, Gilbert Islands.
- Emily Tompkins. For services to the British community in Bilbao.
- Francis Charles Unwin, Second Secretary (Consular), British High Commission, Lagos.
- Ernest James Voysey, BEM, lately Administration Officer, British High Commission, Nicosia.
- Frederick Charles Harry Wagstaff. For services to the British community in Qatar.
- John Burns Wallace, Principal Probation Officer, Bermuda.
- James Ebenezer Walwyn. For services to the community in St. Kitts-Nevis-Anguilla.
- Susan Mary Williams. For services to English education in Kuwait.
- Doris Witts, lately Administrative Assistant to the Chairman, N.A.T.O. Military Committee, Brussels.
- Charles Bertrand Wrathmell, Director, British Council, Shiraz, Iran.

Australian States

State of New South Wales

- Vera May Adderley (Mrs. V. M. Jones). For service to nursing.
- George Neville Bailey. For service to sport.
- Patricia Lucille Bernard. For service to the community.
- Charles Stanley Chambers. For service to the community.
- Mother (Miss) Marion Agnes Corless. For services to religious education.
- Alderman Janice Ann Crosio. For service to local government.
- Vincent John Crowe. For service to the transport industry.
- Councillor Anne Caroline Findlay. For service to local government and the community.
- Harold Casterton Harper. For service to conservation.
- The Reverend Father John Edward Heaps. For service to religion and the ethnic community.
- Chenya Huang. For service to medicine and the ethnic community.
- Robert James Ingram. For service to music.
- Ethel Marion Lane. For service to ex-servicemen and women.
- Anthony Guiseppe Lopes. For service to the community and Aboriginal welfare.
- Alexander Ian Mackie. For service to sport.
- Ronald Vivian Pearson. For service to ex-servicemen.
- David Robertson Reid. For service to medicine and the community.
- Vincent Ross Smith. For service to journalism.
- John Keith Walker. For service to the community and the wine and food industry.
- Hazel Claire Weekes. For service to medicine.
- Robert Alexander Forbes Weatherly. For service to the community.

State of Victoria

- William Henry Beischer, of Bendigo. For service to dentistry.
- Norma Jean Buckland, of Brighton. For public service.
- Harry Dench, of Strathmore. For service to the meat industry.
- Silvester Augustine Doyle, of Bendigo. For service to greyhound racing.
- Councillor Thomas Allan Drechsler, of Sedgwick. For municipal service.
- Royden Beresford Mactier Gerrand, of Stradbroke. For service to rural industry.
- The Reverend Canon Leslie Guy Harmer, of Doncaster. For community service.
- Councillor Kenneth Humphrey Harrison, of Pyramid Hill. For municipal service.
- Alister Ashworth Hinchley, of Dimboola. For service to medicine.
- Kenneth Irvine James Hodgson, JP, of McKinnon. For community service.
- Councillor Leslie James Howarth, of Ecklin South. For municipal service.
- Ruby May Ivison, of Hampton. For municipal service.
- Gwendolyn Marjorie Nisbet, of Glen Iris. For service to music.
- Henri Schubert, of Ashwood. For service to amateur athletics.
- Councillor Jessie Margaret Scott, of Ballarat. For municipal service.
- Lloyd Cecil Worland, of Frankston. For municipal service.

State of Queensland

- Councillor Thomas William Acton, of via Dingo. For local authority and community services.
- Henry Norman Charles Bandidt, of Monto. For services to the community.
- Caroline Barker, of Coorparoo. For her contribution to art.
- The Reverend Father Thomas William Carroll, of Kenmore. For community service.
- Gregory Stephen Chappell, of Kenmore. For his contribution to cricket.
- Councillor James Dimitrios, of Mundubbera. For service to the community.
- Gertrud Ann Amalie Sophie Goessling, of Kingaroy. For service to the community.
- Councillor William Joseph Harold Holmes, of Winton. For local authority and community service.
- Samuel James Charles Johnson, of Rita Island. For his contribution to the surf life saving movement.
- Harold Edward Phillips, of Thulimbah. For services to the fruit industry and to the community.
- Douglas Garland Rattray, of Bundaberg. For his local authority and community service.
- Somerset Thorn, of Dalby. For service to the community.

State of Western Australia

- James Henry Arbuckle, of Karrinyup. For service to the vegetable industry.
- Cezary Aleksander Baranowski, of Subiaco. For services to immigrants and the community.
- Noel Henry Maxwell Colyer, of Armadale. For services to medicine and the community.
- Lilian Sarah Higgins, of Salter Point. For services to the community.
- Clarice Jean Lucas, of Carnamah. For services to the community.
- Bernard Edward Kirwan Ward, of Nedlands. For services to journalism.

=== Companion of the Imperial Service Order (ISO) ===
Home Civil Service

- Basil Neale Baker, Principal, Board of Customs and Excise.
- Peter Bernard Barraud, lately Regional Executive Officer, Ministry of Agriculture, Fisheries and Food.
- George Richard Brandon, lately Principal, Department of Industry.
- Douglas Haig Cameron, Senior Legal Assistant, Scottish Land Court.
- Branston Martin Case, First Class Valuer, Board of Inland Revenue.
- Hamish Christie, Principal Professional and Technology Officer, Ministry of Defence.
- Denis John Day, Senior Principal Scientific Officer, Ministry of Defence.
- Lewis Bertram Grace, Superintending Engineer, Department of Transport.
- Hazel Frances Graham, Principal, Department of Education and Science.
- John Henry Haynes, Principal, HM Land Registry.
- Alan James Napier, Senior Inspector of Taxes, Board of Inland Revenue.
- Alastair Patrick Donald Ross, Senior Principal, Department of Employment.
- Norman Saddler, lately Official Receiver, Department of Trade.
- George Clark Stirling Telfer, lately Senior Principal, Ministry of Defence.
- Roy Leonard Thomas, Senior Principal, Ministry of Defence.
- Michael George Thompson, lately Senior Principal, Home Office.
- Henry Thornton, Principal, Department of Health and Social Security.
- Fred Tootle, HM Senior District Inspector of Mines and Quarries, Department of Employment.
- John Bullivant Whitehouse, Foreign and Commonwealth Office.
- Stanley Wilkins, Principal, Ministry of Defence.
- John Richard Wilson, lately Principal, HM Stationery Office.
- Mary Dorothy Wolfe, Principal, Department of Health and Social Security.
- Geoffrey Wooldridge, Senior Principal Scientific Officer, Ministry of Defence.

Diplomatic Service and Overseas List

- Manuel James Danino, Superintendent of Telephones, Gibraltar.
- Richard Officer Mackie, Senior Superintendent of Prisons, Hong Kong.
- Albert John Nutten, Government Chemist, Hong Kong.
- U-lam Wong, Deputy General Manager, Government Railway, Hong Kong.

Australian States

State of New South Wales

- Kenneth John Trott. Under-Secretary and Permanent Head, New South Wales Ministry of Transport.

State of Victoria

- Arthur John Alliance Gardner, lately Chairman of the Public Service Board of Victoria.

State of Queensland

- David Keith Houston, lately Permanent Head, Department of Works.

State of Western Australia

- Nancy Richards, Superintendent of Secondary Schools.

=== British Empire Medal (BEM) ===
Military Division

Royal Navy

- Chief Petty Officer Physical Trainer Norman Richard Malcolm Austwick, J835761L.
- Chief Marine Engineering Artificer (H) Colin Ernest Baskerville, M983714C.
- Sergeant John Brown, P990772E, Royal Marines Reserve.
- Chief Marine Engineering Mechanic Graham Evan Callander, K946330D.
- Colour Sergeant David Capper, P019264S, Royal Marines.
- Chief Control Electrical Artificer Derek George Dart, M933806H.
- Chief Petty Officer Stores Accountant Ronald Densham, M832849K.
- Colour Sergeant Edward Christopher Ennis, P021264G, Royal Marines.
- Acting Sergeant John David Francis, P020202A, Royal Marines.
- Ordnance Electrical Mechanician 1 Cyril Robert Gray, M838879E.
- Chief Petty Officer Airman (CA) William John Leslie Izzard, F769475Q.
- Chief Petty Officer Ralph Clifford Lawday, D985598D, Royal Naval Reserve.
- Petty Officer Marine Engineering Mechanic Leung Ting To, Hk 0.2895.
- Marine Engineering Mechanician (P)1 Brian Little, K914392P.
- Chief Medical Technician Albert Gerald Lyons, M8494S4E.
- Chief Wren Regulating Dorcas Moore, UW952116V, Women's Royal Naval Reserve.
- Acting Chief Petty Officer Store Accountant Denis Jerome Murphy, M950936L.
- Acting Chief Electrical Mechanician (A) (local) James Parker, F871748D.
- Chief Petty Officer (OPS)S David Charles Roberts, D066222L.
- Chief Petty Officer (OPS)R Philip Selwood, D051217G.
- Chief Petty Officer Physical Trainer John Elliott Sproule, J936S61Q.
- Marine Engineering Artificer (P)1 Joseph Lionel Temple, QD982566K, Royal Naval Reserve.
- Chief Radio Electrical Mechanician Brian Thomas, M974267U.
- Chief Petty Officer Writer Albert Edwin Tomlin, D128143W.
- Chief Aircraft Artificer (A/E) Michael Francis Welsh, D065766T.
- Leading Seaman (SR) Peter John Wooding, J978935Y.
- Leading Wren Writer Sarah Caroline Young, W129446E.

Bar to the British Empire Medal

- Chief Petty Officer Writer Victor Norris Smithbone, BEM, M605159B.

Army

- 14471621 Staff Sergeant (Local Warrant Officer Class 2) John Arthur Allott, The Light Infantry.
- 23809549 Corporal John Francis Andrews, The Gloucestershire Regiment.
- 24027626 Staff Sergeant John Arkinstall, Royal Army Ordnance Corps.
- 22134493 Staff Sergeant (Local Warrant Officer Class 2) Joseph Armstrong, Royal Regiment of Artillery.
- 23863607 Sergeant Alexander Wilson Arnold, 51st Highland Volunteers, Territorial and Army Volunteer Reserve.
- 23932822 Sergeant William Barlow, Royal Army Ordnance Corps.
- 23905287 Staff Sergeant Clairmonte Louis Belle, The Royal Scots Dragoon Guards (Carabiniers and Greys).
- 23666320 Staff Sergeant Eric Birchall, Royal Corps of Signals.
- 23998554 Staff Sergeant Ian Borland, Royal Corps of Signals.
- 24048749 Sergeant Dennis Bradley, Grenadier Guards.
- 22304117 Corporal Francis Clarke, Royal Corps of Transport, Territorial and Army Volunteer Reserve.
- 23705805 Staff Sergeant William Mitchell Clarke, Royal Army Medical Corps.
- 23487382 Staff Sergeant Lennard Cockerill, Corps of Royal Engineers.
- 23980532 Lance Corporal (Acting Corporal) John Alfred Crouch, The King's Regiment.
- 22831569 Staff Sergeant Horace Alfred Edwards, Welsh Guards.
- 23931303 Staff Sergeant Brian Hatch, Corps of Royal Engineers.
- 23657011 Staff Sergeant Trevor Hobday, Corps of Royal Electrical and Mechanical Engineers.
- 23786936 Sergeant George Henry Holden, Royal Corps of Signals.
- 23825874 Staff Sergeant (Acting Warrant Officer Class 2) John Hunter, Army Catering Corps.
- 24182733 Sergeant Paul Steven Jackson, The Royal Anglian Regiment.
- 22541015 Sergeant Charles Eric Jones, Royal Corps of Signals.
- 23937168 Staff Sergeant Graham Oliver Jones, The Light Infantry.
- 23663016 Staff Corporal Gilbert Charles Godwin Keeys, The Life Guards.
- 23542566 Staff Sergeant (Acting Warrant Officer Class 2) Brian Manton, Corps of Royal Military Police.
- 23978874 Bombardier (Acting Sergeant) Percy Bernard Marsh, Royal Regiment of Artillery.
- 22209313 Staff Sergeant Samuel Cameron McClean, Royal Regiment of Artillery, Territorial and Army Volunteer Reserve.
- 24030091 Staff Sergeant Andrew Ernest Nex, Royal Corps of Signals.
- 23527450 Sergeant Denis Patrick Joseph O'Donovan, The Royal Regiment of Fusiliers.
- 23886108 Staff Sergeant Peter Pagnanelli, Army Physical Training Corps.
- 21156013 Staff Sergeant Pasangdhendup Lama, 10th Princess Mary's Own Gurkha Rifles.
- 23229941 Corporal George Peat, Corps of Royal Military Police.
- 23809938 Corporal John Alun Pritchard, The Royal Regiment of Wales (24th/41st Foot).
- 24009992 Sergeant John Henry Richards, Royal Corps of Transport.
- 23674140 Corporal Geoffrey Tempest Robinson, Corps of Royal Military Police.
- 23743885 Sergeant (Acting Staff Sergeant) Clive Sawyer, Royal Corps of Transport.
- 24115871 Staff Sergeant Roy Sheriff, Royal Corps of Transport.
- 23535909 Sergeant Alexander Joseph Smith, Mercian Volunteers, Territorial and Army Volunteer Reserve.
- 24062211 Sergeant (Acting Staff Sergeant) William Charles Tonkins, Royal Army Ordnance Corps.
- 24008243 Staff Sergeant Richard Jonathan Tristram, Corps of Royal Electrical and Mechanical Engineers.
- 23910631 Sergeant Cyril Frederick Ward, The Royal Green Jackets.
- 23668964 Corporal Gordon Wharram, The Queen's Regiment.
- 22970162 Sergeant (Local Staff Sergeant) Ronald Woods, Royal Regiment of Artillery.
- 24190457 Sergeant David Bryan Williams, Corps of Royal Electrical and Mechanical Engineers.
- 22845629 Sergeant (Acting Staff Sergeant) Richard Willows, Royal Corps of Transport.
- 23978079 Staff Sergeant Christopher Stanley Wilson, Army Air Corps.

Royal Air Force

- J1933953 Flight Sergeant Terry Allen.
- U1945987 Flight Sergeant Richard Angel.
- Y0684292 Flight Sergeant George Corwin Fuller.
- U1812019 Flight Sergeant Alexander Henry Graham.
- Y1703339 Flight Sergeant Elwyn David James.
- B4092790 Flight Sergeant John David McIntyre.
- R4251711 Flight Sergeant James McNeil, RAF Regiment.
- V4071789 Flight Sergeant Peter Markwick.
- POS88268 Flight Sergeant Allan Payne.
- A4173297 Flight Sergeant David Arnold Terron.
- T3523341 Chief Technician John Baines.
- M0687873 Chief Technician John Leigh Caley.
- N1930449 Chief Technician Thomas Darling.
- A4201044 Chief Technician Cornelius Francis Lillis.
- J0S89797 Chief Technician David Richard Murley.
- W1937197 Chief Technician Graham Harold Gordon Cresswell Philp.
- N4194153 Chief Technician Walter Ritchie.
- N1937219 Chief Technician James Michael Wood.
- G0683106 Chief Technician Michael John Young.
- VI946215 Sergeant Brian James Balls.
- C3522639 Sergeant Jacques Fraser.
- G0688034 Sergeant Michael John Herbert.
- Q42S2207 Sergeant Alan Kelly.
- T3525710 Sergeant Donald Armour MacCallum.
- T4049570 Sergeant Peter Douglas Paige.
- X1935089 Sergeant Terence Edwin Tomlinson.
- D4263780 Sergeant John Watts.
- P4256870 Corporal William Graham Gibbs.
- Q2842481 Corporal Carole Una Plowman, Women's Royal Air Force.

Civil Division
United Kingdom

- Archibald Durward Adams, lately Chief Officer Class II, Longriggend Remand Institution.
- John Edward Alford, Resident Service Representative, British Aerospace, Romania.
- Francis Henry Allaway, Shift Supervisor, Southern Water Authority.
- Gordon Anderson, Janitor, Selkirk High School.
- William George Andrews, lately Chief Inspector of Machine Tools, H. W. Ward & Co., Worcester.
- David Appleby, Head Works Foreman, Welwyn Garden City.
- Margaret Doreen Argyle, Commandant, Tarnworth Centre, Staffordshire Branch, British Red Cross Society.
- Leonard Allan Arnold, Head Ranger, Ashdown Forest.
- Reginald Alec Arnold, lately Inspector, Vauxhall Motors Ltd.
- Gilbert Spencer Avis, Chief Steward Grade 1, H.Q. Officers' Mess, Ashford, Ministry of Defence.
- Thomas Lionel Baker, Superintendent, Wollaton Park, Nottingham City Council.
- Frank Ball, Roll Grinder, Shepcote Lane Works, Sheffield Division, British Steel Corporation.
- Hilda Beatrice Barnes, lately Domestic Orderly, The London Hospital, City and East London Area Health Authority.
- Ivy Mabel Annie Barron, lately School Crossing Patrol, Sutton Coldfield.
- Robert Samuel Barter, School Crossing Patrolman, Tremorfa, Cardiff.
- Henry Edward Baynham, lately Process and General Supervisory B, Royal Ordnance Factory, Birtley, Ministry of Defence.
- Wilfrid Richard Beagle, lately Process and General Supervisory B, Royal Ordnance Factory, Leeds, Ministry of Defence.
- William Beck, Sub-Officer, Derbyshire Fire Brigade.
- Margaret Beckett, Branch Secretary, Whitehaven Branch, General and Municipal Workers Union.
- Douglas Henry Belcher, lately Yard Foreman, Wolvercote Paper Mill, Oxford.
- James Bethell, Chargehand, Building Works Department, Capenhurst Works, British Nuclear Fuels Ltd.
- Percy Bicheno, Civilian Instructional Officer Grade III, Air Engineering School, HMS Daedalus, Ministry of Defence.
- Robert John Bingham, Sergeant, Royal Ulster Constabulary.
- David Lionel Blackman, Radio Officer, Ilfracombe Radio Station, External Telecommunications Executive, The Post Office.
- Leslie Blackmur, Supervisor, Catalogue Shop, British Library.
- Alec Bowles, Knitting School Manager, Wildt Mellor Bromley Ltd., Leicester.
- Ivy Bradley, Centre Organiser (Middlesbrough), Cleveland Branch, British Red Cross Society.
- Samuel Robinson Branch, Painter, Civil Engineering Department, Windscale and Calder Works, British Nuclear Fuels Ltd.
- Jack Gordon Bridges, Area Supervisor, Paxmans Ltd., Colchester.
- Joseph Henry Brittain, Office Keeper III, Office of the Director of Public Prosecutions.
- Percy Jack Brooker, lately Foreign and Commonwealth Office.
- Henry George Brown, Pest Operator, Ministry of Agriculture, Fisheries and Food.
- Peter Victor Brown, Area Staff Officer (Grade III), London District (South Eastern Area), St. John Ambulance Brigade.
- William Thomas Burdett Browning, Deputy Check Inspector, Redring Electric Ltd., Peterborough.
- Eric Kenneth Bunting, lately Gas Fitter, March District, Fens Area of Eastern Region, British Gas Corporation.
- John William Butler, DSM, lately Head Porter, St. Mary's Hospital, Hampshire Area Health Authority.
- Alexander Calder, Core Maker, Foundry, Leyland Operations, British Leyland.
- William Joseph Campbell, Boilerman, Mid-Ulster Hospital, Magherafelt, Co. Londonderry.
- Maurice Melville George Chandler. For services to Sport in Salop.
- Thomas Lawrence Chapman, Major Works Agent, London Borough of Waltham Forest.
- Evelyn Louisa Cheney, Sub-Postmistress, Bruntingthorpe, Midlands Postal Region, The Post Office.
- David William Chitty, Plaster Attendant, Battle Hospital, Berkshire Area Health Authority.
- Violet Kate Churchill, Cook-Supervisor, Maiden Beech School, Crewkerne, Somerset.
- Allan David Clark, lately Head Groundsman, Ayr Racecourse.
- James William Clarke, lately Production Manager, Cannon Rubber Ltd. For services to Export.
- Samuel Corbett, Senior Radio Car Inspector, Citybus Ltd.
- William Coulter, Highways Supervisor I, Department of the Environment, Northern Ireland.
- Reginald Tom Cripps, Gardener/Groundsman 2, HMS Dauntless, Ministry of Defence.
- Denzil Roy Franklin Cross, Chargehand, Electronic Component Manufacturing Section, Marconi Instruments Ltd., St. Albans.
- Francis John Dale, Constable, Royal Ulster Constabulary.
- Violet Evelyn Dalgleish, Assistant Steward, Wardroom Mess, London Division, Royal Naval Reserve, Ministry of Defence.
- William Davies, Chargehand, Billet Grinding Section, Edgar Allen Balfour Steels Ltd., Manchester.
- John Davis, Aircraft Woodworker, Aircraft Group, British Aerospace, Warton.
- William Charles Dawkins, Works Supervisor, Basildon Development Corporation.
- Thomas Derbyshire, Clerical Officer, London Midland Region, British Railways Board.
- Beatrice Dexter, Lace Mender, Holmes & Baxter Ltd., New Basford, Nottingham. For services to Export.
- William Robinson Douglas, lately Chauffeur, Marchon Works, Albright & Wilson Ltd.
- Constance Victoria Duncan. For services to the community, particularly to disabled people, in Aberdeen.
- Roy Dunkin, Truck Operator I, Esso Petroleum Co. Ltd., Immingham.
- Annie Eastwood, Senior Sample Machinist and General Supervisor and Training Instructor, Shaw & Lyddon Ltd.
- Eileen Hughes Evans, lately Organiser, Wales Area Clothing Store, Women's Royal Voluntary Service.
- George Stanley Evans. For service to disabled people in Cinderford, Gloucestershire.
- Reginald Douglas Fitzgerald, Driver, Oxfordshire County Council.
- Charles William Fogg, Sergeant, Metropolitan Police.
- William Forsyth, lately Cleaner/Caretaker, Calton Cash and Carry Warehouse, McNab Groceries Ltd.
- John Lawrence Fowler, Special Projects Engineer, Fairey Hydraulics Ltd., Heston.
- James Oswald Fraser, Section Officer, South Yorkshire Special Constabulary.
- Jeanie George, Domestic Assistant, Carrickfergus Old People's Home, Co. Antrim.
- Francis Harold Grant, Constable, West Midlands Police.
- Terence John Gray, Sergeant, Metropolitan Police.
- Leslie Gregg, Foreman Electrician, Property Services Agency, Department of the Environment.
- Gordon Harry Guilbert, Butler, Government House, Guernsey.
- Cedric Neville Harry Gunning, Steward, Guardian Royal Exchange.
- George Thomas Gutsell, Chargehand Carpenter, Royal Greenwich Observatory.
- George Haigh, Maintenance Craftsman I, Transport Section, Tingley, North Eastern Region, British Gas Corporation.
- Sarah Mary Haigh, Sorter, M. J. & G. Stross Ltd., Dewsbury.
- Nancie Edith Halsall, Local Organiser, Newcastle-under-Lyme (Country Area), Staffordshire, Women's Royal Voluntary Service.
- Harold Hannaford, Sergeant, Metropolitan Police.
- Elizabeth Harper (Mrs. Botshi), Telephone Operator, Ulsterbus Ltd. and Citybus Ltd.
- Ronald William Hasler, Supervisor Show Working Operative, British Broadcasting Corporation.
- John Hassard, Postal Officer, Northern Ireland Postal and Telecommunications Board, The Post Office.
- Frank Richard Hayman, Assistant Steward, County Hall, Maidstone.
- Arthur Charles Hazzard, Forest Clerk, Rhondda, Forestry Commission.
- William Henry Hearn, Artificial Limb Fitter, J. E. Hanger & Co. Ltd., London.
- Beatrice Maud Herkes, Foster Mother, Fife Regional Council.
- Frederick Hindley, Supervisor of Accommodation Services, Risley, United Kingdom Atomic Energy Authority.
- Arthur John Hinson, Commissionaire, London Coliseum.
- George Hird, Chargehand Motor Mechanic, York District, North Eastern Region, British Gas Corporation.
- Charles Arthur Hodge, lately Principal Officer, HM Prison, Chelmsford.
- Hugh Hogg, Grade I Foreman, Northern Ireland Electricity Service.
- Charles Hughes, Office Keeper Grade III, HM Customs and Excise.
- Elizabeth Mary Hughes, Assistant, Out-patient Department, Caernarfon and Anglesey Hospital, Bangor.
- William Henry Humphries, Leading Fireman, Fire Authority for Northern. Ireland.
- Robert Hunter, Process Technician, Scottish Region, British Gas Corporation.
- John Hurst, lately Maintenance Fitter, North West Region, British Gas Corporation.
- Victor George Iles, Painter, South West Works (Bristol), Bsc (Chemicals) Ltd., British Steel Corporation.
- Percival Frederick James, Foreman Installation Inspector, South Bank District, London Electricity Board.
- Lilian Kitty Jarvis, Forelady of Leatherwork, A. Lewis (Airlok) Ltd., London N.1.
- Richard William Percival Jeffers, Principal Keeper, Coquet Lighthouse, Trinity House Service.
- Doris Louise Jennings, Member, Ruislip, Women's Royal Voluntary Service.
- Arthur William Johnson, Chief Photoprinter, Board of Inland Revenue.
- Edith Maud Johnson, District Organiser, Mansfield, Women's Royal Voluntary Service.
- Frederick William Raymond Johnson. For services to Road Safety.
- Isabella Johnstone, House Matron, Queen Victoria School, Dunblane, Ministry of Defence.
- Sarah Jane Jones. For services to the community of Ammanford.
- Thomas James Jones, Full Loads Supervisor, Hafod Yard, Swansea, Western Region, British Rail.
- John Michael Jury, Constable, Nottinghamshire Constabulary.
- Alfred Kaye, Colliery Overman, Gedling Colliery, South Nottinghamshire Area, National Coal Board.
- Johanna Mary Kearney, Housekeeper to the Speaker, House of Commons.
- Douglas Wilfred Kelly. For services to the community, particularly the elderly, in Douglas, Isle of Man.
- William Aloysius Kelly, Foreman, Cottam Power Station, Midlands Region, Central Electricity Generating Board.
- Norman Russell Kemp, Craftsman I, National Maritime Institute.
- Marian Kidd, Village Representative, Danby and Castleton, North Yorkshire, Women's Royal Voluntary Service.
- John Knox, Colliery Training Officer, Boldon Colliery, North East Area, National Coal Board.
- Harold Hayden Lancaster, Machine Minder, HM Stationery Office.
- Raymond Leslie Langdale, Sergeant, Humberside Police.
- Nellie Margaret Leach, Deputy County Organiser, Northamptonshire, Women's Royal Voluntary Service.
- Arthur Leather, Commissionaire, Remploy Ltd., London.
- Luther Lodwig, Underground Haulage Rider, Cwm Colliery, South Wales Area, National Coal Board.
- Eric Lowe, Advanced Mining Training Instructor, Grassmoor Training Centre, North Derby, National Coal Board.
- Eric Arnold Lummas, Foreman 3, Commercial Section, York, North Eastern Electricity Board.
- Winifred Mary Lynham, Local Organiser, Bridgwater, Somerset, Women's Royal Voluntary Service.
- Robert Ernest McConachie, Chief Observer, Head Observer, No. 29 Group (Aberdeen), Royal Observer Corps.
- Arthur McCullough, Civilian Instructional Officer 3, Home Office.
- William George McCullough, Sergeant, Royal Ulster Constabulary.
- Douglas James Braund MacDonald, Head Gardener, Crathes Castle, The National Trust for Scotland.
- William MacFarlane, Production Foreman, Ferranti, Edinburgh.
- Philip Frederick McIntyre, Porter/Messenger, Patent Office.
- Peter Miller Mackay, Crofter, Caithness.
- Sydney Mackness, Postman, Eastern Postal Region, The Post Office.
- Lachlan Maclean, Sub-Officer, Northern Fire Brigade.
- Donald MacLeod, Instructor, High School of Dundee Pipe Band, Combined Cadet Force.
- Iain MacTaggart, Constable, Strathclyde Police.
- Andrew McMillan Mair, Foreman Plater, Steelwork Department, Ailsa Shipbuilding Co. Ltd.
- Albert Edward Manchester, Head of Maintenance, Confederation of British Industry.
- Brenda Mary Beaumont-Markland, Prison Welfare and After-care Organiser, St. Helens Metropolitan District, Women's Royal Voluntary Service.
- Leslie Henry Marshall, Senior Messenger, Department of Industry.
- John Matthews, Highway Superintendent, Humberside County Council.
- George Henry Meen, Senior Storeman, Royal Air Force, Wyton, Ministry of Defence.
- John Edgar Merton, Boatswain, Souter Hamlets Ltd.
- Sydney Ernest Mew. For service to the community in Tonbridge, Kent.
- Arthur Raymond Millard. For services to the community in Churchill, Avon.
- Albert Richard Miller, Leading Meter Mechanic, Thames Water Authority.
- Albert Edward Moore, Senior Storeman, Property Services Agency, Department of the Environment.
- Frank Moore, Motor Mechanic, Barrow Lifeboat, Royal National Lifeboat Institute.
- Hugh McGregor Morrison, Messenger, Mountwise Headquarters, Plymouth, Ministry of Defence.
- George Edgar Maurice Newton, lately Carpenter and Joiner, Medical Research Council Laboratories, Carshalton, Surrey.
- Joyce Oakes, Organiser, County Staff, Hospital Welfare, Suffolk Women's Royal Voluntary Service.
- Eric O'Dell, Foreman, Repository and Search Room Assistant, Public Record Office.
- Ralph Joseph O'Grady, lately Operations Foreman, Thorpe Marsh Power Station, North Eastern Region, Central Electricity Generating Board.
- Percival George Old, Production Superintendent, Sutton Bingham Reservoir and Treatment Works.
- Alice May O'Shea, Office Keeper III, Department of Education and Science.
- Stanislaw Walerian Pachowski, Chief Steward, Ambrosden Officers' Mess, Central Ordnance Depot, Bicester, Ministry of Defence.
- Allan Robert Frank Pady, Fitter/Erector, Weybridge, Bristol Division, Aircraft Group, British Aerospace.
- Idris Ivor Parfitt, County Cadet Officer, Gwent, St. John Ambulance Brigade.
- Arthur Parsons, Garden Supervisor, City of Stoke-on-Trent.
- Arthur William Alexander Parsons, Test Engineer, Dynamics Group, British Aerospace. For service to Export.
- Joseph Edward Paterson, Railway Shopman, Eastern Region, British Rail.
- James Paton, Vehicle Reception Clerk, City of Edinburgh District Council.
- Douglas Norman Pearce, Senior Writer, Port of London Authority.
- Grant Pedley, Head Gardener, Calderdale Area Health Authority.
- Edward Frederick Perry, Schoolkeeper, Parliament Hill School, Inner London Education Authority.
- Erik Gerald Petersen, Manager, Navy, Army and Air Force Institutes, St. Mary's Island, Chatham.
- Mary Phillips, lately Supervisor, Linen Department, Booth Hall Hospital, Blackley, Manchester.
- Queenie Lilian Phillips, Cook/Manageress, Staff Restaurant, National Institute of Agricultural Botany.
- William Kenneth Phillips, Postal Executive "D", Stoke-on-Trent, Head Post Office, Midlands Postal Region, The Post Office.
- Beryl Cynthia Pidcock, Station Catering Manager, Birmingham New Street, British Rail.
- Charles James Pilgrim, Scenemaster, Southern Television Ltd.
- William Jack Pitt, Professional and Technology Officer Grade 3, Ordnance Survey.
- Gordon Turnbull Potter. For services to St. Peter's Church, Monkwearmouth, Sunderland.
- Sydney Emmanuel Potter, Warden, Fernworthy Reservoir, Devon, South-West Water Authority.
- Ronald George Herbert Powell, Chargehand Gardener, Audley End, Department of the Environment.
- Jack Pratt, Salesman, Spencer, Abbott (Petroleum) Ltd. (Esso).
- Arthur Price, Foreman Pavior, Mersey Docks & Harbour Company.
- Harold Thomas Prickett, Cleaner, Ministry of Agriculture, Fisheries and Food.
- Albert Austin Proctor, Compositor, Shields Gazette, Tyne and Wear.
- Brian William Prust, Warrant Officer, Devon Wing, Air Training Corps.
- George Edward Reed, lately Regimental Sergeant Major Instructor, Army Cadet Force, Hampshire.
- Thomas Richard Reed, Constable, Cleveland Constabulary.
- William Charles Reed, Revenue Assistant, HM Customs and Excise.
- Nora Reeve, Administrator, Mansfield Unit, Sea Cadet Corps.
- Morris Henry Rex Regis. For services to the Chiswick and Thameside Boys' Club.
- William Roberts, Fitter, Hatfield/Chester Division, British Aerospace.
- William Richard Roberts, Mill Shift Boss, Geevor Tin Mines Ltd.
- David Albert Rogers, Leading Fireman, Avon Fire Brigade.
- Evelyn Lydia May Rogers. For services to the community, particularly the elderly, in Bromley and Bexley.
- Stanley Rogers, Chassis Dock Foreman, Midland Red Omnibus Co. Ltd.
- Thomas Walter Rolfe, Constable, Nottinghamshire Constabulary.
- Isabella Paton Ross, Cook Supervisor, Hamilton College of Education.
- James Alexander Ross, Foreman, Field Control Unit, Dingwall, North of Scotland Hydro-Electric Board.
- Edward William Rowe, Professional and Technology Officer Grade III, HM Dockyard, Devonport, Ministry of Defence.
- Patrick Ryan, Lorry Driver, Ipswich, British Road Services.
- Ernest James Saunders, lately Leading Hand Steel Erector, Property Services Agency, Department of the Environment.
- Roy Scanlan, Professional and Technology Officer Grade III, Principal Naval Overseer's Office, Barrow, Ministry of Defence.
- Frederick Arthur Sewell, Professional and Technology Officer Grade Iv, Royal Ordnance Factory, Nottingham, Ministry of Defence.
- Henry Shelock, Caretaker, Ministry of Defence.
- Michael Sims, Constable, City of London Police.
- Harold Arthur Slipper, Constable, Metropolitan Police.
- James William Small, Court Officer, Perth Sheriff Court.
- Henry Smith, lately Motor Driver, National Carriers Ltd.
- Leslie Frank Spragg, Professional and Technology Officer Grade III, HM Naval Base, Portsmouth, Ministry of Defence.
- William Charles Jack Stevens, Booking Clerk Class 1, London Transport Executive.
- Bessie Ellen Strutt, Member, City of London Branch, British Red Cross Society.
- John Arthur Sturman, Senior Vesselman, Normanby Park Works, Scunthorpe Division, British Steel Corporation.
- Kenneth William Talbot, Sub-Officer, London Fire Brigade.
- Thomas Alfred Sydney Taylor, Foreign and Commonwealth Office.
- William Eaton Taylor, Hand Weaver, Luthermuir. For services to Export.
- Lawrence Teasdale. For services to the Grainger Park Boys' Club, Newcastle upon Tyne.
- Harry Albert Telling, Ambulanceman, Chase Farm Ambulance Station, London.
- Arthur Oscar Thompson, Instructional Officer III, Training Services Division, Manpower Services Commission.
- John Watson Turley. For services to Birkwood Hospital, Lesmahagow.
- Sydney Charles Wagstaff, Supervisor, Eley Ammunition Division, Imperial Metal Industries (Kynoch) Ltd.
- John Waring, Chargehand Fitter, Northern Ireland Carriers Ltd.
- Joshua Edward Warner, Auxiliary Coastguard in Charge (Lookout Section), Sizewell, Norfolk.
- George Wasson, Instructional Officer, Department of Manpower Services, Northern Ireland.
- Edward Watts, Leading Research Worker, Weston-birt Arboretum, Forestry Commission.
- Kenneth John James Watts, Production Control Section Leader, Bristol Engine Group, Rolls-Royce Ltd.
- David Raymond Webster, Goods Inward Inspector, Lansing Henley Ltd., Pontllanfraith, Gwent.
- Geoffrey White, Driver, Yorkshire Traction Co. Ltd.
- Violet May White, Supervisor-in-Charge, Civil Service Catering Organisation, Civil Service Department.
- John Whyte, Horticultural Superintendent, France Area, Commonwealth War Graves Commission.
- Percy Wilcox, Chargehand Driver, Motor Transport Section, School of Signals, Ministry of Defence.
- John Alexander Wiseman, Boatswain, Kyle of Lochalsh, Ministry of Defence.
- Helen Clark Wishart, Member, Headquarters, St. Andrew's Ambulance Association.
- John Birch Woodward. For service to the Royal British Legion Industries.
- Arthur Edward Woollett, Caterer/Supervisor, Maidstone, Kent.
- Florence May Worth, Chief Office Keeper (Grade 1A), Home Office.
- Robert Norman Wright, Sub-Officer, Essex Fire Brigade.
- John Young. For services to the community in Ashington, Northumberland.

Overseas Territories

- May Binnie. For services to the community in the Falkland Islands.
- Cheng Yuk-lam, Chief Customs Officer, Preventive Service, Hong Kong.
- Kwok Kwong-tin, Senior Clerical Officer, Hong Kong.
- Zenobia Eunice Meggs, Staff Midwife, Medical Department, Belize.
- Mui Sie-mun, Clerical Officer Class I, Hong Kong.
- Theophilus Paul. For services to the community in St. Kitts-Nevis-Anguilla.
- Shiu Kwok-kwan, Senior Clerical Officer, Hong Kong.
- Siu Yu-hong, Supplies Supervisor, Public Works Department, Hong Kong.
- Pedro Vila, Principal Officer, Prison Department, Gibraltar.
- Yeung Mau-hon, Clerical Officer Class I, Hong Kong.

Australian States

State of New South Wales

- Marim Martin Alagich. For service to the ethnic community.
- Harold Armstrong. For service to the community.
- Ernest Harold Black. For service to sport.
- Eric Sydney Bogg. For service to youth.
- Cyril Albert Bowden. For service to the transport industry.
- John Alexander Cameron. For service to the community.
- Sister (Miss) Margaret Mary Alexa Campbell. For service to nursing.
- Mary Clayton. For service to the community.
- Athol Bryan Davies. For service to sport.
- Ashley Edwin Dawson. For service to the community.
- Frances Eliza Donnelly. For service to the community.
- Hazel Melba Evans. For service to the community.
- Elwin Robert Ferris. For his invaluable help following a motor accident to others.
- The Reverend Norman Fox. For service to religion.
- Phyllis Mary Friederich. For service to charity.
- David Allen George. For his invaluable help following a swimming accident.
- William Henry Hart. For service to sport.
- Alexei Kisliakov. For service to the ethnic community.
- Philip Christian Koperberg. For service to the community.
- Lia Looveer. For service to the community and the ethnic community.
- Patricia Marcia McDonald. For services to the State.
- Nikola Milic. For service to the ethnic community.
- Elizabeth Nash. For service to the community.
- James Douglas Richardson. For service to the community.
- Pamela Richardson. For service to the community.
- Margaret Vera Roberts. For service to the community.
- Beryl Russell. For service to the community.
- Samuel Austin Seaman. For service to sport.
- Kenneth George Smith. For service to the community.
- Victor Raymond Thatcher. For service to ex-servicemen.
- Amy Rose Tournay. For service to the community.
- Maud Alison Watt. For service to ex-servicemen.

State of Victoria

- Kathleen May Foster Andrews, of Glen Iris. For community service.
- Florence Mary Bennett, of Toorak. For service to pre-school education.
- Vera Florence Bennett, of Kyabram. For community service.
- Grace Elizabeth Berglund, of Darnum. For service to disabled children.
- Charlotte Helena Campbell, of Beaufort. For community service.
- John Joseph Cornall, of Caulfield. For service to hospital administration.
- Mavis Mary Crawford, of Balwyn. For community service.
- Francis John Doolan, of East St. Kilda. For public service.
- Margaret Jean Ellwood, of East Geelong. For service to rural youth organisations.
- Stanley Edgar Fostineo, of Carrum. For community service.
- Sidney Walter Goldfinch, of Camberwell. For community service.
- Christopher Sidney Johnston, of Romsey. For community service.
- Mary Jean Kerr, of Kialla. For service to child welfare.
- Annie Christina Kettle, of Colac. For service to scouting.
- Jack Oliver Leary, JP, of Mildura. For community service.
- Hilda Mayes, of Mount Waverley. For service to the community.
- Allan James Monaghan, of Bendigo. For service to swimming.
- Mary Morton, of Warburton. For community service.
- John Patrick Noonan, of Camberwell. For service to youth.
- Dorothy Margaret Paul, of Camberwell. For service to floral art.
- Jack Douglas Verity, of Frankston. For community service.
- Dorothy Waight, of Williamstown. For service to animal welfare.
- Edna Mavis Wells, of Oakleigh. For service to disabled children.
- John Russell Wheeler, of Belmont. For service to conservation.

State of Queensland

- The Reverend Father Dudley Dennis Boland, of Kangaroo Point. For service to the community.
- John Charles Clark, of Ipswich. For service to the community and sport.
- George Thomas Cox, of Gordon Park. For service to the community.
- George Day, of Ingham. For service to youth in his local community.
- Ethel Ellen Ensor, of Bell. For service to the community.
- John Harry Fagg, of Everton Park. For service to the community.
- Stanley Morgan Dart Goodhew, of Wilston. For service to the community.
- Rita Mary Hele, of Oakey. For her services to the community.
- James Newman, of Kumbia. For service to his local community.
- Patricia Nichols, of Roma. For her devoted care of aged people.
- Gerald Hubert Thurlow, of Alderley. For service to scouting.
- Sydney Irvine Vellnagel, of Brigalow. For service to the community.
- Benjamin Charles White, of Alderley. For service to the community.

State of Western Australia

- Charles Robert Carr, of Subiaco. For services to the community.
- Rachel Elliott Carr, of Subiaco. For services to charity and the community.
- Beatrice Millicent Jasper, of Cunderin. For services to the community.
- Mabel Ada Mills, of Dalwallinu. For services to the community.
- Alexander Ewing Prior, of Claremont. For services to surf life saving.
- Norman Charles Snow, of Scarborough. For services to music.
- Helen Rosemary Dorothy Blake Foulkes-Taylor, of Peppermint Grove. For services to the community and Girl Guides.
- May Annie Violet Wallace, of Subiaco. For services to the deaf.
- Homer Arthur White, of Albany. For services to the community.

=== Royal Red Cross (RRC) ===
- Colonel Mabel Selina Shaw (371915), Queen Alexandra's Royal Army Nursing Corps.

==== Associate of the Royal Red Cross (ARRC) ====
- Superintending Sister Hilary Elizabeth Jean Gillespie, Queen Alexandra's Royal Naval Nursing Service.
- Superintending Sister Edith Meiklejohn, Queen Alexandra's Royal Naval Nursing Service.
- Superintending Sister Myrtle Evelyn Williams, Queen Alexandra's Royal Naval Nursing Service.
- Fleet Chief Medical Technician Derek Johnson, M966071V.
- 23483134 Warrant Officer Class 1 Patrick Ralph Artis, Royal Army Medical Corps.
- Major Mary Elizabeth Mulhern (485144), Queen Alexandra's Royal Army Nursing Corps.
- Squadron Officer Sheila Partington Clarke (407203), Princess Mary's Royal Air Force Nursing Service.

=== Air Force Cross (AFC) ===
Royal Navy

- Lieutenant Commander John Rush.

Royal Air Force

- Wing Commander Terence John Nash (4230199).
- Squadron Leader Christopher James Baldwin (4180573).
- Squadron Leader Derek Vivian Brice (3116959).
- Squadron Leader Roy William Gamblin (4231478).
- Squadron Leader Francis James Hoare (608142).
- Squadron Leader Keith Graham Holland (4231810).
- Flight Lieutenant Allan Frank Brewer (585598).
- Flight Lieutenant George Walter Broadbent (607626).
- Master Signaller George Canning (N1321903).

Bar to the Air Force Cross

- Wing Commander Clive Charles Rustin (2600804), AFC.

=== Queen's Police Medal (QPM) ===
England and Wales

- Kenneth Lee Vincent Baker, Chief Superintendent, Suffolk Constabulary.
- Jack Buxton, Chief Superintendent, Staffordshire Police.
- George Edward Fenn, Chief Constable, Cheshire Constabulary.
- Dennis Charles Greenslade, Superintendent, Avon and Somerset Constabulary.
- David William Halsey, Deputy Assistant Commissioner, Metropolitan Police.
- Arthur Henry Howard, Commander, Metropolitan Police.
- James Kerr, Chief Constable, Lincolnshire Police.
- Kenneth Mayer, Deputy Chief Constable, Bedfordshire Police.
- Terence John O'Connell, Commander, Metropolitan Police.
- Ian Gordon Barr Richardson, Commander, Metropolitan Police.
- Phyllis Sigsworth, Chief Superintendent, Northumbria Police.
- Kevin Somers, Chief Superintendent, Sussex Police.
- John Frederick Stimson, lately Commander, City of London Police.
- William Abbey Watkinson, Chief Superintendent, Lancashire Constabulary.
- Robert Joseph Webb, Assistant Chief Constable, South Wales Constabulary.
- John Ewart Wilkins, Assistant Chief Constable, Hampshire Constabulary.

Scotland

- Patrick Hamill, Chief Constable, Strathclyde Police.
- Matthew Woodrow Jack Stirrat, Assistant Chief Constable, Fife Constabulary.

Northern Ireland

- George Maxwell Walton, Detective Inspector, Royal Ulster Constabulary.

Overseas Territories

- Thomas George John, CPM, Deputy Chief of Police, St. Helena Police Force.
- Gallon Bertram St. John, CPM, Commissioner of Police, Royal Montserrat Police Force.
- Esmond Alexander Willoughby, Commissioner of Police, Belize Police Force.

Australian States

State of New South Wales

- William Allan Ruthven Allen, Superintendent, New South Wales Police Force.
- Maurice Kelly, Superintendent, New South Wales Police Force.
- Leonard Owen Laughton, Superintendent, New South Wales Police Force.
- Ross Page Morrison, Sergeant 1st Class, New South Wales Police Force.
- John Ferdinand Palmer, Superintendent, New South Wales Police Force.
- James Vincent Petith, Superintendent, New South Wales Police Force.
- Sidney Keith Ransley, Superintendent, New South Wales Police Force.
- Robert Snaith Redhead, Inspector, New South Wales Police Force.
- William Buchanan Ross, Superintendent, New South Wales Police Force.

State of Victoria

- Percival Noah Dennis Ball, Superintendent, Victoria Police Force.
- William John Brand, Inspector, Victoria Police Force.
- Arthur Oswald Hann, Senior Sergeant, Victoria Police Force.
- Colin Robert Hodder, Senior Sergeant, Victoria Police Force.
- Robert John Martin, Chief Superintendent, Victoria Police Force.
- Ludwig Keith Plattfuss, Superintendent, Victoria Police Force.

State of Queensland

- Ronald Albert Donovan, Superintendent, Queensland Police Force.
- Douglas Edward Dux, Inspector, Queensland Police Force.
- William Oswald John Kielly, Superintendent, Queensland Police Force.
- James Edward Purcell, Superintendent, Queensland Police Force.

State of Western Australia

- Colin Bert Power, Superintendent, Western Australian Police Force.
- Clifford Basil Vincent Sherry, Superintendent, Western Australian Police Force.

State of Tasmania

- Geoffrey William Ling, Superintendent, Tasmania Police Force.

=== Queen's Fire Services Medal (QFSM) ===
England and Wales

- John Edgar Baldwin, Divisional Officer Grade I, Northamptonshire Fire Brigade.
- Clifford George Colenutt, Assistant Chief Officer, London Fire Brigade.
- Leslie Harold Cummins, Assistant Chief Officer, Hampshire Fire Brigade.
- John James Killoran, Chief Fire Officer, Devon Fire Brigade.
- Richard John Sumner, Assistant Chief Officer, West Midlands Fire Brigade.

=== Colonial Police Medal (CPM) ===
- Roy St. Aubyn Archer, Deputy Commissioner, Cayman Islands Police Force.
- Barwin Augier, Sergeant of Police, Royal St. Lucia Police Force.
- Claudio Baldachino, Superintendent of Police, Gibraltar Police Force.
- Ioane Been, Sergeant of Police, Gilbert Islands Police Force.
- William Patrick Bryan, Inspector of Police, Bermuda Police Force.
- Peter Yick-sheung Chan, Senior Superintendent of Police, Royal Hong Kong Police Force.
- Randolph Valentino Charles, Inspector of Police, Royal St. Lucia Police Force.
- Chi-leung Chu, Station Sergeant of Police, Royal Hong Kong Police Force.
- Chung-boon Fong, Senior Ambulance Officer, Hong Kong Fire Services.
- John Francis Greene, Senior Superintendent of Police, Royal Hong Kong Police Force.
- John Godfrey Guy, Chief Inspector of Police, Royal Hong Kong Police Force.
- King-kong Ho, Station Sergeant of Police, Royal Hong Kong Police Force.
- John Gillean Mansell, Senior Superintendent of Police, Royal Hong Kong Police Force.
- Cheun-chung Ng, Station Sergeant of Police, Royal Hong Kong Police Force.
- Chui-fong Ng Chan, Sergeant of Police, Royal Hong Kong Police Force.
- Tak-sum Pang, Senior Ambulance Officer, Hong Kong Fire Services.
- Cuthbert Darnley Phillips, Assistant Commissioner, Royal St. Lucia Police Force.
- Catherine Roper, Chief Inspector of Police, Royal Hong Kong Police Force.
- Lotua Tebukei, Assistant Superintendent of Police, Gilbert Islands Police Force.
- Po-kwan Yeung, Superintendent of Police, Royal Hong Kong Auxiliary Police Force.

=== Queen's Commendation for Valuable Service in the Air ===
Royal Air Force

- Squadron Leader Olaf William Alderson (4049157), AFC.
- Squadron Leader David William Bramley (507523).
- Squadron Leader Leslie George Buckingham (2312257).
- Squadron Leader Ernest Charles Dunsford (2462113), BEM.
- Squadron Leader Victor Charles Lockwood (4232694).
- Squadron Leader Brian Peter Synnott (608553).
- Squadron Leader Michael John Webb (607977).
- Flight Lieutenant John Blackwell (8024995).
- Flight Lieutenant Barrie Anthony Julian Chown (4220161).
- Flight Lieutenant Alan Robert Clark (608337).
- Flight Lieutenant Edward Christopher Rodney Dicks (608401).
- Flight Lieutenant Edward Hugh Farrant (4142066).
- Flight Lieutenant Elvin William Thomas Marshall (2458194).
- Flight Lieutenant Peter Leslie Alan Martin (4233204).
- Flight Lieutenant Raymond Frank Passfield (4063826).
- Flight Lieutenant Thomas Henry Taylor (4257734).
- Flight Lieutenant Peter John Warren (4233484).
- Master Air Electronics Operator Edward Arthur Clarke (U0588746).
- Master Air Loadmaster Jeffery John Longmuir (Y0684633).
- K3522805 Flight Sergeant Henry MacDonald.

United Kingdom

- Brian James Calvert, Chief Route Check Captain, Concorde, British Airways.
- Roy Lawson Heriet McDougall, Captain, Operations Director, Britannia Airways Ltd.

== Australia ==
=== Knight Bachelor ===
- Milton John Napier Atwill, of Woollahra, New South Wales. For distinguished service to commerce.
- John Arthur (Jack) Brabham, OBE, of Bankstown Aerodrome, New South Wales. For distinguished service to the sport of motor racing.
- Arthur Frederick Deer, CMG, of Turramurra, New South Wales. For distinguished service to the training of disabled people and to the community.
- Frank Fletcher Espie, OBE, of South Yarra, Victoria. For distinguished service to the mining industry.
- David Osborne Hay, CBE, DSO, of Deakin, Australian Capital Territory. For distinguished public service.

=== Order of Saint Michael and Saint George ===
==== Knight Commander of the Order of St Michael and St George (KCMG) ====
- Senator the Honourable Condor Louis Laucke, of Greenock, South Australia. For distinguished parliamentary service.
- Sir Ian Munro McLennan, KBE, of South Yarra, Victoria. For distinguished service to youth, the community and industry.

==== Companion of the Order of St Michael and St George (CMG) ====
- John Armstrong England, ED, of Darwin, Northern Territory. For public and parliamentary service.
- The Most Reverend John Patrick O'Loughlin, of Darwin, Northern Territory. For service to the church and the Aboriginal community.
- Donald Dean von Bibra, OBE, of Ross, Tasmania. For service to the wool industry and to the community.
- Dr. James Richard Henry Watson, of Applecross, Western Australia. For services to health.

=== Order of the British Empire ===
==== Dame Commander of the Order of the British Empire (DBE) ====
Civil Division

- Joan Sutherland, AC, CBE, (Mrs. Bonynge), of London, United Kingdom. For distinguished service to the performing arts.

==== Knight Commander of the Order of the British Empire (KBE) ====
Military Division

- Vice-Admiral Anthony Monckton Synnot, AO, CBE, Chief of Naval Staff.

Civil Division

- Brigadier Sir William Henry Hall, CBE, DSO, ED, of Caulfield, Victoria. For distinguished service to veterans.

==== Commander of the Order of the British Empire (CBE) ====
Civil Division

- Allan Percy Fleming, OBE, of Campbell, Australian Capital Territory. For public service.
- John Hugh Garrett, OBE, of Deakin, Australian Capital Territory. For public service.
- William Ronald Lane, of Indooroopilly, Queensland. For service to the government.
- Ray Stanley Livingston, of O'Connor, Australian Capital Territory. For public service.
- Dr. Charles Renton Newbury, of Glen Iris, Victoria. For service to dentistry and orthodontics.
- Dr. Bradney William Norington, of North Ryder, New South Wales. For service to the health and rehabilitation of disabled people.
- Dr. Ellen Mary (Ella) Stack (Mrs. Lawler), of Fannie Bay, Northern Territory. For service to local government, health and the community.
- Emeritus Professor Denis Winston, of Woollahra, New South Wales. For service to urban planning.

==== Officer of the Order of the British Empire (OBE) ====
Civil Division

- Arthur George Bollen, of Griffith, Australian Capital Territory. For public service.
- Robert Noel Bonnett, of McGregor, Australian Capital Territory. For service to veterans and for parliamentary service.
- George Austin Colman, of Deakin, Australian Capital Territory. For service to commerce, the disadvantaged and the community.
- Douglas Graham Davidson, of Darling Point, New South Wales. For service to health and commerce.
- Gwenllian Collier Forsyth, BEM, of Wembley, Western Australia. For service to women and children and the community.
- Olivia Newton-John, of Los Angeles, USA. For service to the performing arts in Australia and overseas.
- William Douglas Kennedy, of Weetangera, Australian Capital Territory. For public service.
- Irene Mary Kennedy, of Kingswood, South Australia. For service to health and nursing administration.
- Stephen Mappin King, of Devonport, Tasmania. For service to the oil poppy industry.
- Dr. William Andrew Langsford, of Ainslie, Australian Capital Territory. For public service.
- Margaret Frances Maber, of South Perth, Western Australia. For public service.
- John Francis Mant, ED, of Vaucluse, New South Wales. For service to law and the community.
- Dr. Ronald Mendelsohn, of Red Hill, Australian Capital Territory. For public service.
- Ernest Duckett Mills, of Longford, Tasmania. For service to agriculture.
- Robert Lance Nicholls, of Casino, New South Wales. For service to the meat industry and to the community.
- John Gerard Riley, of Castle Cove, New South Wales. For service to aviation.
- Harold George Shaw, of Wembley Gardens, Western Australia. For public service.
- John Dundas Simson, of Ardmona, Victoria. For service to the canned fruit industry.
- Thomas Murrell Stephens, of Mount Waverley, Victoria. For public service and for service to veterans.
- Freeman Roland George Strickland, of South Yarra, Victoria. For service to commerce.
- Milan Vyhnalek, of Burnie, Tasmania. For service to the cheese industry, migrants and the community.
- Max Wryell, of Hackett, Australian Capital Territory. For public service.

==== Member of the Order of the British Empire (MBE) ====
Military Division

Royal Australian Navy

- Lieutenant Commander Nicholas Frederick Helyer (0103298).
- Lieutenant Donald Walter Meredith (053940).
- Lieutenant Commander Dennis Edmond Albert Thornett (0111218).

Australian Army

- Major Kevin Frederick Bailey, ED, (2166729), Royal Australian Engineers.
- Captain Michael John Barnwell (213679), Royal Australian Infantry.
- Major Arthur William Blewitt (235338), Royal Australian Engineers.
- Captain William Ronald Field (42482), Royal Australian Infantry.
- Captain Albert Norman Powell (16067), Royal Australian Infantry.
- Major Robert Lawrence Taylor (342647), Australian Army Band Corps.

Royal Australian Air Force

- Squadron Leader Alan Raymond Barrett (0221301).
- Squadron Leader Daryl John Casey (044432).
- Squadron Leader John Graham Neil Miller (043796).

Civil Division

- Walter Aigner, of Ingleburn, New South Wales. For service to productivity.
- Cedric Howard Ashton, of Newport, New South Wales. For service to music, musical education and the arts.
- Audrey June Attwood, of Mount Allen Station, via Alice Springs, Northern Territory. For service to Aboriginal education.
- Freda Evelin Barwick, of Oatlands, Tasmania. For service to women, education, youth and the community.
- Gabriel Helen Bonner, of Mosman, New South Wales. For service to the metal trades industry.
- Harold Thomas Rex Boundy, of Minlaton, South Australia. For service to local government and the community.
- Barry Thomas Cable, of Beckenham, Western Australia. For service to the sport of Australian Rules Football.
- Henry George Carruthers, of Arncliffe, New South Wales. For service to the sport of athletics and to the community.
- Mario Giovanni Carlo Cinquini, of Joondanna, Western Australia. For service to the migrant community in Western Australia.
- James Justin Alexander Clezy, of Richmond, Victoria. For service to youth and the community.
- Robert Gallimore Cochrane, of Mount Ommaney, Queensland. For public service.
- Ashley Joseph Dorsett, of Canberra, Australian Capital Territory. For public service.
- Patricia Olwen Edgley, of Bourke, New South Wales. For service to the education of children in remote areas.
- Lieutenant Colonel Frederick Evans, ED, of Culburra, New South Wales. For services to the aged and the community.
- Patricia Ann Evans, of Bairnsdale, Victoria. For service to local government, the aged and the community.
- Lillian Audrey Finniss, of Alice Springs, Northern Territory. For service to sport, the aged and the community.
- Geoffrey Green, of Frenchs Forest, New South Wales. For public service.
- Frederick John Gunn, of Launceston, Tasmania. For service to the timber industry, veterans and the community.
- Claude Nicholas Gurd, of Gordon, New South Wales. For service to retired officers and to the community.
- Sister (Miss) Mary Beatrix Hazell, of Killcare, New South Wales. For public service in the field of nursing.
- Heather Emily Hewett, of Goulburn Island Mission, via Darwin, Northern Territory. For service to Aboriginals in the fields of linguistics, health and religion.
- Patrick Rowland Holmes, of Narrabundah, Australian Capital Territory. For public service.
- Alexander Jesaulenko, of East Rosanna, Victoria. For service to the sport of Australian Rules Football.
- Marcia Meymott Kirsten, of Glenside, South Australia. For service to youth Literature.
- Tiy Jabangadi Langdon, of Yeundumu, Northern Territory. For service to the Aboriginal community.
- Dolores Veronica Martha Lenihan, of Phillip, Australian Capital Territory. For service to migrant education.
- Leslie John Martyn, of Frankston, Victoria. For service to sport.
- Henry James Moffat, Australian High Commission, London, England. For public service.
- John Edward James Moss, of Park Holme, South Australia. For public service.
- Betty Winifred Parsons, of Wollstonecraft, New South Wales. For public service.
- Jill Perryman (Mrs Johnston), of Gooseberry Hill, Western Australia. For service to the performing arts.
- Lynette Mary Powierza, of Darwin, Northern Territory. For service to migrant education.
- Thomas Wilbur Washington Pye, of Ainslie, Australian Capital Territory. For service to local government, children, and the community.
- Philip Andreas Read, of Lockleys, South Australia. For service to the sport of tennis.
- John Healey Ryves, of Norfolk Island. For service to local government and the community.
- Veronica Eileen Rogers, of Deniliquin, New South Wales. For public service.
- Eric Milne Siggs, of Essendon, Victoria. For public service.
- Harry Phillip Skinner, of Ryde, New South Wales. For service to music, music education and to the community.
- Sister (Miss) Joan Smedley, of Numbulwar, Northern Territory. For service to Aboriginal health.
- Noel David Alexander Stitt, of North Ipswich, Queensland. For service to the sport of motor cycle racing.
- Alan Robert Melbourne Sumner, of Collingwood, Victoria. For service to the arts.
- Lorna Pauline Thomas, of Leichhardt, New South Wales. For service to the sport of women's cricket.
- Willy Walalipa, of Galiwinku Community, Northern Territory. For service to the Aboriginal community.
- Aaron Treve Woodcock, of Mentone, Victoria. For service to the sport of horse racing.
- Tracey Lee Wickham, of Kedron, Queensland. For service to the sport of swimming.

=== Companion of the Imperial Service Order (ISO) ===
- Victor John Bahr, Regional Director, New South Wales Bureau of Meteorology, Department of Science.
- Francis James Buchanan, Project Manager Class 3, Western Australian Naval Support Facility Project, Department of Construction.
- Robert William Cruikshanks, Public Service Inspector, South Australia.
- George Henshilwood, lately Deputy Commissioner of Patents, Department of Productivity.
- Margaret Jean Purtell, ED, Director of Nursing, Repatriation General Hospital, Concord.

=== British Empire Medal (BEM) ===
Military Division
Royal Australian Navy

- Leading Seaman Alan John Davies (R103784).
- Petty Officer Brian Stuart Jones (R94460).
- Chief Petty Officer Bruce Earnest Spender (R59235).

Australian Army

- Sergeant Robert Stanley Barrett (622401), Royal Australian Infantry.
- Corporal Robin Hugh Beckham (56651), Royal Australian Army Medical Corps.
- Staff Sergeant Garry Kenneth Benson (36955), Royal Australian Infantry.
- Staff Sergeant William George Grey (213037), Royal Australian Army Ordnance Corps.
- Corporal William George Killick (52124), Royal Australian Infantry.
- Sergeant Johannes Stoffels (53869), Royal Australian Signals.

Royal Australian Air Force

- Flight Sergeant Evan Noel Davis (A22328).
- Flight Sergeant Glen William Gadsby (A17797).
- Sergeant William Gregory Noble (A223242).

Civil Division

- Walter John Beaumont, of Penguin, Tasmania. For service to the community.
- Jozef Biega, of Howrah, Tasmania. For public service.
- Winifred Bill, of Concord, New South Wales. For public service.
- Doreen Rose Braitling, of Alice Springs, Northern Territory. For service to the community.
- Florence Valentine Crook, of Lithgow, New South Wales. For service to the community.
- Honora Cupitt, of Windsor, New South Wales. For service to the community.
- Thomas George Victor Davis, of Toowoomba, Queensland. For service to youth and the community.
- Marion Dawson Delve, of Curlewis, New South Wales. For service to women and the community.
- Patricia Reynell Dolman, of King's Island, Tasmania. For service to youth and the community.
- Lily Ellen Bowling, of Layington, New South Wales. For service to the community.
- Mary Ann Doyle, of Braddon, Australian Capital Territory. For service to migrants and the community.
- Roy William Stanley Edwards, of Margate Beach, Queensland. For service to conservation.
- Terrance John Edwards, of Merrylands, New South Wales. For service to the community.
- Alice Ann Emanuel, of Cronulla, New South Wales. For service to children and the community.
- Nellie Bernice Frye, of Beecroft, New South Wales. For service to disabled people and to the community.
- Ina Gess, of North Balwyn, Victoria. For service to disabled children.
- Nellie Hank, of Lockleys, South Australia. For service to the community.
- Gordon Herbert Hill, of Parramatta, New South Wales. For public service and for service to retired officers.
- Alberta Constance Koop, of Alexandra, Victoria. For service to youth, sport and the community.
- Doriel Nancy Leece, of Adamstown Heights, New South Wales. For service to the community.
- John Lawrence Lindblom, of Pooraka, South Australia. For public service and for service to local government and the community.
- Dorothy Ellen Lindsay, JP, of Haberfield, New South Wales. For service to the community.
- Lola Evelyn Lynam, of Claremont, Western Australia. For public service.
- Margaret Mary McGinness, of Braddon, Australian Capital Territory. For public service.
- Dorothy Mary McGregor, of Mile End, South Australia. For service to musical education.
- John MacLean MacGregor, of Kew, Victoria. For service to the disadvantaged and to the church.
- Leonard Roy Montefiore, of Blacktown, New South Wales. For service to veterans and the community.
- Elaine Margaret Nance, of Canberra, Australian Capital Territory. For public service.
- Eileen Weedon-Newstead, of Honolulu, USA. For public service.
- John Arthur Newton, of New Lambton, New South Wales. For service to disabled people.
- Laura Eileen Paton, of Sandy Bay, Tasmania. For service to women, children and the community.
- Bridget Theresa Robinson, of Sandgate, Queensland. For service to the aged and the community.
- Shelagh Noreen Robinson, of Montmorency, Victoria. For public service.
- John (Jack) Smith, of Dubbo, New South Wales. For service to veterans, the aged and the community.
- Walter Summerhayes, of Sans Souci, New South Wales. For service to the community.
- Charles Joseph Tanner, of Oak, Park, Victoria. For public service.
- Nicolas Tsoulias, of Campbell, Australian Capital Territory. For service to migrants.
- Johnston Robert Joseph Twine, of Hawker, Australian Capital Territory. For public service.
- Edmund John Walker, of Tingha, New South Wales. For service to local government, legacy and bush fire control.
- Dulcien Amelia Waterfield, of Berrimah, Northern Territory. For public service.
- Ethel Frances West, of Stockinbingal, New South Wales. For service to the community.
- Winifred Elizabeth White, of North Kew, Victoria. For public service.
- Olive Wilson, of Devonport, Tasmania. For service to the community.
- William Joseph Woods, of Dromana, Victoria. For public service.
- Leslie George Wright, of Yarralumla, Australian Capital Territory. For public service.

=== Royal Red Cross (RRC) ===
==== Associate of the Royal Red Cross (ARRC) ====
- Major Olga Dorothy Hedemann, (F51341), Royal Australian Army Nursing Corps.
- Wing Commander Ella Muriel Bone, (N54649), Royal Australian Air Force Nursing Service.

=== Air Force Cross (AFC) ===
Royal Australian Navy

- Lieutenant John Michael Hamilton (02861).

Australian Army

- Captain John Jefferson McGhie (55479), Australian Army Aviation Corps.

Royal Australian Air Force

- Squadron Leader Allen John Gibbon (0216379).
- Flight Lieutenant John Walter Kindler (0224938).
- Flying Officer Richard Noel Woodward, (0320451).

=== Queen's Police Medal (QPM) ===
- William Henry Bennett, Senior Superintendent and Acting Principal, Australian Police College.
- John Charles Johnson, Deputy Commissioner, Australian Capital Territory Police Force.

=== Queen's Commendation for Valuable Service in the Air ===
Royal Australian Air Force

- Flight Lieutenant Anthony Peter Franks (0113660).
- Sergeant Ian James McGarry (A57691).

== Barbados ==
=== Knight Bachelor ===
- Sidney Launcelot Martin. Pro-Vice-Chancellor, University of the West Indies, and Principal, Cave Hill Campus (Barbados) of the University.

=== Order of the British Empire ===
==== Commander of the Order of the British Empire (CBE) ====
Military Division

- Colonel Joseph Connell, OBE, ED, formerly Honorary Colonel, The Barbados Regiment.

== Mauritius ==
=== Knight Bachelor ===
- Louis Joseph Maurice Rault, QC, Chief Justice.

=== Order of Saint Michael and Saint George ===
==== Companion of the Order of St Michael and St George (CMG) ====
- Jacques Jules Paul Hein. For political and public services.

=== Order of the British Empire ===
==== Knight Commander of the Order of the British Empire (KBE) ====
Civil Division

- Dayendranath Burrenchobay, CMG, CVO, Acting Governor-General of Mauritius.

==== Officer of the Order of the British Empire (OBE) ====
Civil Division

- Louis France Horace Empeigne. For services in the field of statistics and economic development.
- Jean Frederic Parfait, lately Permanent Secretary, Ministry of External Affairs, Tourism and Emigration.
- Aissa Bibi Rajabally (Mrs. Hoorbai Rajabally). For voluntary social work.
- Moteelall Sadasing. For services to rural local government and voluntary social work.

==== Member of the Order of the British Empire (MBE) ====
Civil Division

- Antoine Willy Alphonse. For service in the postal services.
- Kistapen Desscann. For services in the printing industry and trade union movement.
- Jewnarain Gopee. For services to the co-operative movement and rural local government.
- Abdool Hamidkhan Jaffarbeg. Composer and singer.
- Serge Ludovic Roussel. For voluntary social work.
- Balkissoon Treeboohan. For voluntary social work.

== Fiji ==
=== Order of the British Empire ===
==== Commander of the Order of the British Empire (CBE) ====
Civil Division

- Satya Nand Nandan, Ambassador of Fiji to the European Economic Community, and to the Kingdom of Belgium, and Head of Fiji's Delegation to the United Nations' Law of the Sea Conference.

==== Officer of the Order of the British Empire (OBE) ====
Civil Division

- James Ah Koy. For services to commerce and the community.
- Kenneth Albert Stuart, lately Judge of the Supreme Court.
- Tilak Kumar Verma. For services to Government.
- Ratu Livai Volavola. For services to the community.

==== Member of the Order of the British Empire (MBE) ====
Military Division

- Major Otto Johansen, BEM, Royal Fiji Military Forces.
- Warrant Officer Class I Varea Solomone Mesulame, Royal Fiji Military Forces.

Civil Division

- Mark Israel. For services to commerce and the community.
- Peter Keith Seeto. For services to the community and in local government.
- Captain Edward Trevor Stroude Withers. For services to the tourist industry.

=== Companion of the Imperial Service Order (ISO) ===
- Uttam Chandra, Chief Administrative Officer, Public Service Commission.

=== British Empire Medal (BEM) ===
Military Division

- Staff Sergeant Konisi Ratumaiwai, Royal Fiji Military Forces.

Civil Division

- Epeli Vuki Tavai, lately Provincial Bailiff.

== Bahamas ==
=== Knight Bachelor ===
- The Honourable Mr. Justice James Alfred Smith, CBE, TD, Chief Justice.

=== Order of the British Empire ===
==== Officer of the Order of the British Empire (OBE) ====
Civil Division

- James Rispah Lowe, Secretary of Revenue.

==== Member of the Order of the British Empire (MBE) ====
Civil Division

- Lawrence Whitfield Major, QPM, CPM, Assistant Commissioner of Police in charge of the Police Marine Division, Royal Bahamas Police Force.
- The Reverend Canon David Harold John Lawrence Pugh. For long and devoted service as a priest and educator.

=== British Empire Medal (BEM) ===
Civil Division

- Raymond John Lloyd. For services to the community.
- The Reverend James Mackey. For services to the community.
- Kenneth Leroy Sawyer, recently Chief Generator Engineer, Bahamas Electricity Corporation.

=== Queen's Police Medal (QPM) ===
- Cyril Errol Joseph, Superintendent, Royal Bahamas Police Force.
- Alphonso Marshall, Deputy Superintendent, Royal Bahamas Police Force.
- Keith Verde Mason, Chief Superintendent, Royal Bahamas Police Force.
- Howard Thomas George Smith, CPM, Superintendent, Royal Bahamas Police Force.

== Grenada ==
=== Order of the British Empire ===
==== Officer of the Order of the British Empire (OBE) ====
Civil Division

- Florence Altrude Iola Rapier. For public service.

==== Member of the Order of the British Empire (MBE) ====
Civil Division

- Lloyd Alexis. For public service in the field of medicine.

=== British Empire Medal (BEM) ===
Civil Division

- Charles Francis. For services to sport
- Lloyd Munro, Government Farm Supervisor.
- Joseph Vincent Roberts, Sergeant, Grenada Police Force.
- Cuthbert Emmanuel Vincent, Engineering Assistant, Public Works Department.

== Papua New Guinea ==
=== Order of the British Empire ===
==== Commander of the Order of the British Empire (CBE) ====
Civil Division

- Philip Bouraga, OBE, Secretary, Department of the Prime Minister.
- The Honourable Mr. Justice Edmund Peter Tom Raine, ED, Deputy Chief Justice.

==== Officer of the Order of the British Empire (OBE) ====
Civil Division

- Andrew Andaija. For services to political development in the Southern Highlands.
- The Reverend Herbert Alfred Brown. For service to religion and to the community.
- Benedict Benits Lanzarote. For services to local government and to the community.

==== Member of the Order of the British Empire (MBE) ====
Military Division

- Captain Brian John Humphreys, (Royal Australian Signals) Papua New Guinea Defence Force.
- Warrant Officer Class 2 Tande Togolua, Papua New Guinea Defence Force.

Civil Division

- Cosmas Raita Hannett. For public service in the field of communications.
- Dorothy Ena Harris. For services to health and the community.
- Rosalina Violet Kekedo. For service in the field of education.
- Kepa Pupu. For services to the community.
- Christopher Warren Van Lieshout. Official Secretary to the Governor-General.

=== British Empire Medal (BEM) ===
Military Division

- Sergeant John Semoso Hagae, Papua New Guinea Defence Force.
- Lance Corporal Heta, Papua New Guinea Defence Force.

Civil Division

- James Timinge Keremi. For service in the field of health.
- Konty, Sergeant Major, Royal Papua New Guinea Constabulary.
- Paheki, Senior Sergeant, Royal Papua New Guinea Constabulary.
- Sanangowei, Senior Sergeant, Royal Papua New Guinea Constabulary.
- Siwi, Sergeant Major, Royal Papua New Guinea Constabulary.
- Toirik, Senior Constable, Royal Papua New Guinea Constabulary.
- Tomnakaisili Tokivina, Chief Assistant Correctional Officer, Corrective Institutions Service.
