= Alex Allan =

British civil servant

The Honourable Sir Alex Allan KCB

Chairman of the Joint Intelligence Committee
- In office 15 November 2007 – 2011
- Prime Minister: Gordon Brown; David Cameron
- Preceded by: Sir Richard Mottram as Permanent Secretary, Intelligence, Security and Resilience
- Succeeded by: Sir Jon Day

Clerk of the Crown in Chancery
- In office 1 August 2004 – 15 November 2007
- Prime Minister: Gordon Brown; David Cameron
- Lord Chancellor: Lord Falconer of Thoroton; Jack Straw
- Preceded by: Sir Hayden Phillips
- Succeeded by: Sir Suma Chakrabarti

British High Commissioner to Australia
- In office 1 September 1997 – 31 January 1999
- Prime Minister: Tony Blair
- Preceded by: Sir Roger Carrick
- Succeeded by: Sir Alastair Goodlad

Principal Private Secretary to the Prime Minister
- In office 1992–1997
- Prime Minister: John Major; Tony Blair
- Preceded by: Andrew Turnbull
- Succeeded by: John Holmes

Personal details
- Born: 9 February 1951 (age 75)
- Relations: Robert Allan, Baron Allan of Kilmahew (father)
- Education: Harrow School; Cambridge University; University College London
- Occupation: Civil servant

Sir Alexander Claud Stuart Allan KCB (born 9 February 1951) is a British civil servant who served as chairman of the Joint Intelligence Committee and Head of Intelligence Assessment for Her Majesty's Government between 2007 and 2011.

He resigned as the Prime Minister's Independent advisor on ministerial standards in November 2020.

== Early life ==
Allan is the son of Robert Allan, Baron Allan of Kilmahew. Between 1964 and 1969 Allan was educated at Harrow School, followed by obtaining a BA (Hon) degree in Mathematics from Clare College, Cambridge in 1972. In 1973 he also received an MSc degree in Statistics from University College London.

== Civil Service career ==
- 1973 to 1992 – Allan had various appointments in Customs & Excise and HM Treasury, aside from two years as a freelance computer consultant in Australia (1983–1985).
- 1992 to 1997 – he was the principal private secretary to the Prime Minister (John Major to April 1997, and Tony Blair to Aug 1997).
- 1997 to 1999 – he was the British High Commissioner to Australia.
- 1999 to 2000 – he was e-Envoy for the British Government (succeeded by Andrew Pinder).
- 2001 to 2004 – he moved to Western Australia, where he worked on a range of IT, government and international issues. This included chairing of the inaugural iVEC board.

=== Permanent Secretary of the Department for Constitutional Affairs ===
Allan was the first Permanent Secretary of the Ministry of Justice, having been the last Permanent Secretary of the Department for Constitutional Affairs from which it was created, together with the addition of HM Prison Service and the Office for Criminal Justice Reform, which were taken from the Home Office. Allan served in both of these roles from 1 August 2004 to 15 November 2007. An historical attribute of the role of Permanent Secretary of the Ministry of Justice and its predecessor departments (which included the Lord Chancellor's Department) is that it carries with it the role of Clerk of the Crown in Chancery, an ancient Office, which entails responsibility for overseeing the creation of Letters Patent under the Great Seal, discharged by the Crown Office, itself based in the House of Lords. The Clerk of the Crown in Chancery also has various other responsibilities, including the State Opening of Parliament, and the Prorogation of Parliament. Until the role of the Lord Speaker was carved out of that of the Lord Chancellor, the Clerk of the Crown in Chancery occupied one of Parliament's most prestigious rooms, adjacent to those of the Lord Chancellor. Allan was the last Permanent Secretary and Clerk of the Crown in Chancery to enjoy this splendid room, which he agreed to surrender to the House Authorities so that they could provide suitable accommodation for the newly created Lord Speaker. The only alternative would have been for his political master, the Lord Chancellor, to have given up his room.

On 17 October 2006, Allan submitted oral evidence to the Constitutional Affairs Committee. He was questioned on the 're-organisation of the centre of the Department' (for constitutional affairs) which he stated in his annual report. Allan was asked what he thought were the key changes he had made to the department since his two years in the post. He stated that the key changes to the Department for Constitutional affairs were structural. Allan admitted the department faced big challenges and that there was a lot still to be done. Allan was also questioned over the 'chaos' of the Oracle system (a computer system used by the department).

On 6 February 2007 Allan attended a meeting with the management board for the Information Commissioner's Office (ICO). His duty was to brief the board about the Department for Constitutional Affairs' approach to information rights and the ICO itself. In this meeting Allan recognised inadequate pay as being a key issue in the ICO and across the Department for Constitutional Affairs.

On 4 July 2007, before the Constitutional Affairs Committee, Allan was asked whether he had written an article for MP Vera Baird in The Times. He denied the accusation.

=== Chairman of the Joint Intelligence Committee (JIC) ===
On 15 November 2007 he was appointed Chairman of the Joint Intelligence Committee and Head of Intelligence Assessment. Allan's role was to collect intelligence from the Security Service, MI5, the Secret Intelligence Service, MI6, GCHQ and other sources of intelligence, and present them to ministers as threats developed. He had access to the Prime Minister at all times and also top secret US and UK intelligence reports.

Allan was appointed Knight Commander of the Order of the Bath (KCB) in the 2012 New Year Honours.

=== Independent advisor on ministerial standards ===
In November 2011 he was appointed by David Cameron as the Prime Minister's independent advisor on ministerial standards. In 2012 he said to a public administration committee of MPs that if ever he were "bypassed", he would step down. He resigned from the post on 20 November 2020 after PM Boris Johnson backed Priti Patel following a report Allan had compiled that concluded that Patel's approach "amounted to behaviour that can be described as bullying" and that she had "not consistently met the high standards expected of her". Christopher Geidt also resigned as ethics adviser under Johnson.

== Personal life ==
Allan is responsible for a Grateful Dead lyric and song finder website.

Allan windsurfed to work in a suit and bowler hat down the River Thames during a train strike. He published his personal details on his own website, including his address, telephone number and details of family and friends, which was described by a security official as "a serious breach". Allan lists bridge and computers as his interests.

== Illness ==
On 3 July 2008 it was reported that Allan was unconscious and seriously ill in hospital after he collapsed at his home earlier in the week. Government sources said that there was no sign of foul play. It has been suggested by the media that Allan was poisoned by one of several organisations, including Al Qaeda, or the Russian Government, but this was dismissed by New Scotland Yard. On 10 July 2008 a Cabinet Office spokesman said Allan had regained consciousness but for now would remain in hospital to regain his strength.

David Miliband MP briefly mentioned Alex Allan and his illness in Parliament (17 July 2008):

Very briefly, I would like to put it on record that I have known Alex Allan for 11 years now, and a couple of hon. Members referred to his recent illness and passed on their best wishes to him. I am delighted to say that he will be able to recognise the warmth and strength of that feeling when it is passed on to him in hospital. I am sure that we all wish him a speedy and full recovery from his illness.

On 13 October 2008 he reportedly responded to an enquiry concerning a personal bookplate (designed by Anne Jope). The unusual bookplate depicts a skeletal figure operating a computer.

Diplomatic posts
Preceded by Sir Roger Carrick	High Commissioner to Australia; 1997–1999	Succeeded by Sir Alastair Goodlad
Government offices
Preceded by Sir Hayden Phillips	Permanent Secretary of the Department for Constitutional Affairs; 2004–2007	Succeeded by Sir Suma Chakrabarti; Permanent Secretary of the Ministry of Justice
Preceded by Sir Richard Mottram; Permanent Secretary, Intelligence, Security and Resilience	Chairman of the Joint Intelligence Committee; 2007–2011	Succeeded by Jon Day
