= Judges' Council =

British judicial advisory body

The Judges' Council is a body in England and Wales that, representing the judiciary, advises the Lord Chief Justice on judicial matters. It has its historical roots in the original Council of the Judges of the Supreme Court, created by the Judicature Act 1873 to oversee the new Supreme Court of Judicature. This body initially met regularly, reforming the procedure used by the circuit courts, and the new High Court of Justice but met less regularly as time went on, meeting only twice between 1900 and 1907, with a gap of ten years between meetings in 1940 and 1950 respectively. After relative inactivity, it was eventually wound up through the Supreme Court Act 1981, which contained no provisions for its continued existence, something Denis Dobson attributes to newer bodies which performed the duties the Council had originally been created to do.

The Council was re-established in 1988 following suggestions by both academics and members of the judiciary, initially as an informal body composed of High Court and Court of Appeal judges with no constitutional basis, tasked with maintaining judicial independence and ensuring co-operation between the judiciary and the executive. Since 2002 it has established a written constitution and widened both its membership and remit, including non-High Court and Court of Appeal members and also investigating spending priorities within the court system, representing the judges on matters of pay and pensions and maintaining a Judicial Code of Conduct.

== History ==
=== The first Judges' Council ===
The first Judges' Council sprang out of the Judicature Acts, which created a unified High Court of Justice and Court of Appeal of England and Wales, and also gave these courts permission to alter their own procedure. This was criticised on the grounds that the judges might do so ineffectively or slowly. The 1873 bill's eventual clauses contained, thanks to the influence of Lord Chief Justice Cockburn, provisions for the creation of a Council of the Judges of the Supreme Court. This Council would oversee the new court system, reviewing its workings yearly, and consider the internal procedures of the court. The Council first met on 6 June 1874, providing recommendations for the circuit courts. They considered the circuit courts again in December 1883, where they recommended avoiding the processing of civil business in some towns where assizes were "useless" and the cessation of the tradition of reading the "proclamation against vice and immorality" before every case, ensuring that circuit courts could work with 11 judges instead of 14; despite some opposition, these suggestions were put into practice a year later.

In 1892 the Council considered further reform of the court system to deal with growing backlogs in the Chancery Division and the cost of appeals to the House of Lords. They recommended the establishment of a Commercial Court, the creation of a Court of Criminal Appeal to take over from the Court for Crown Cases Reserved, a better division of work between the Chancery Division and Queen's Bench Division, an additional judge for the Chancery Division and the Attorney General for England and Wales to be given power to appeal against overly lenient sentencing, all of which were eventually put into practice. After this the council met irregularly; only twice between 1900 and 1907. There was a ten-year gap between meetings in 1940 and 1950 respectively, and little was done. The original Judges' Council was eventually indirectly dissolved in 1981, with the Supreme Court Act 1981, which unlike previous Acts of Parliament contained no provisions allowing for the Council's continued existence. Denis Dobson, Permanent Secretary to the Lord Chancellor's Office, suggested this was because other bodies now existed to do what the Council had been created to achieve.

=== The modern Judges' Council ===
In 1986 Lord Donaldson and Professor I.R. Scott campaigned for a new, non-statutory, Judges' Council, arguing that the judiciary had no representative body. At the same time, Sir Nicholas Browne-Wilkinson published a paper that the executive's financial and managerial control over the judiciary was having a negative effect on judicial independence. On 11 January 1988 the proposal for a new Judges' Council was discussed at the annual meeting of the High Court of Justice, where it was formally established under Lord Lane. The new Council was described in Parliament as:

An independent body without a formal constitution. It has no statutory basis, exercises no executive functions and controls no public expenditure. It meets to discuss issues of concern to the senior judiciary and to represents to the views of the senior judiciary to the Lord Chancellor and other individuals and bodies. It is wholly independent of Government and is accountable only to those whose views it represents. Its membership is a matter for the Council itself and those whose views it represents.

The Council's initial remit was to promote co-operation between the judiciary and executive, maintain judicial independence and make court procedure more efficient. To this end, it was composed of the Lord Chief Justice, the Master of the Rolls, the Vice-Chancellor and one High Court Judge. Its current remit also includes maintaining a Judicial Code of Conduct, recommending spending priorities for the court system, representing the judiciary in issues of pay and pensions and liaison with the Judicial Appointments Commission. The Council adopted a written constitution in 2002, and has considerably widened its membership to include representatives from other parts of the judiciary.

== Composition ==
Each level of the judiciary is represented in the Judges' Council. The composition, as of January 2017, is:

=== Ex officio membership and judicial executive board members ===
- The Lord Chief Justice of England & Wales: The Rt. Hon. The Lord Burnett (Chairman)
- Master of the Rolls and Head of Civil Justice: The Rt. Hon. Sir Terence Etherton
- President of the Queen's Bench Division: The Rt. Hon. Sir Brian Leveson
- President of the Family Division and Head of Family Justice: The Rt. Hon. Sir James Munby
- The Chancellor of the High Court: The Rt. Hon. Sir Geoffrey Vos
- The Vice President of the Court of Appeal Criminal Division: The Rt. Hon. Lady Justice Hallett DBE
- The Chairman of the Judicial College: The Rt. Hon. Lady Justice Rafferty DBE
- The Senior President of Tribunals – The Rt. Hon. Sir Ernest Ryder
- The Vice President of the Queen's Bench Division – The Rt. Hon. Lady Justice Sharp DBE
- The Senior Presiding Judge: The Rt. Hon. Lord Justice Fulford

=== Representative members ===
- A Justice of the Supreme Court of the United Kingdom: The Rt. Hon. The Lord Hughes
- A Presiding Judge: The Hon. Mr Justice Haddon-Cave / The Hon. Mrs Justice Nicola Davies DBE
- A High Court Judge of the Chancery Division: The Hon. Mrs Justice Asplin DBE
- A High Court Judge of the Family Division: The Hon. Mr Justice Hayden
- A High Court Judge of the King's Bench Division: Mr Justice Moor
- The President of the Council of His Majesty's Circuit Judges: His Hon. Judge Neil Bidder QC
- The Honorary Secretary of the Council of His Majesty's Circuit Judges: His Hon. Judge Sally Cahill
- A District Judge (Magistrate's Court): Senior District Judge Emma Arbuthnot (Chief Magistrate)
- Member of the Association of High Court Masters: Registrar Christine Derrett
- The President of the Association of His Majesty's District Judges: District Judge Heather Johns
- The Honorary Secretary of the Association of His Majesty's District Judges: District Judge Tacey Cronin
- A Senior Tribunal Judge: Upper Tribunal Judge Stewart Wright
- A Tribunal Judge: Employment Tribunal Judge Philip Davies
- A Tribunal Judge: Tribunal Judge Russell Campbell
- A Member of the Magistrates’ Association: Justice of the Peace Mark Beattie JP
- A Member of the National Bench Chairmen's Forum: Justice of the Peace

=== Co-opted members ===
- Representative on the European Network of Councils for the Judiciary (ENCJ): The Rt. Hon. Lord Justice Vos
- Judicial Member on the board of HMCTS: District Judge Tim Jenkins
- Liaison with the Judicial Council for Scotland: His Hon. Judge Peter Hughes QC

=== Non-voting member ===
- Chief Executive of the Judicial Office: Andrew Key

== Bibliography ==
- Bradley, Anthony (2007). Constitutional and administrative law (14th ed.). Pearson Education. ISBN 978-1-4058-1207-8.
- Thomas, John (2005). "The Judges' Council". Public Law. 49 (3). Sweet & Maxwell. ISSN 0033-3565.
