= Thomas Legg =

British civil servant (1935–2023)

Sir Thomas Legg KCB KC

Clerk of the Crown in Chancery
- In office 1989–1998
- Prime Minister: Margaret Thatcher; John Major; Tony Blair
- Preceded by: Derek Oulton
- Succeeded by: Hayden Phillips

Personal details
- Born: 13 August 1935 London, England
- Died: 8 October 2023 (aged 88) London, England
- Education: St John's College, Cambridge
- Profession: Lawyer
- Committees: 1998: arms to Sierra Leone; 2000: Portcullis House; 2009: United Kingdom parliamentary expenses scandal

Sir Thomas Stuart Legg KCB KC (13 August 1935 – 8 October 2023) was a British senior civil servant, who was permanent secretary of the Lord Chancellor's Department and Clerk of the Crown in Chancery, United Kingdom (1989–98).

== Early life and education ==
Legg was born in London on 13 August 1935, the son of Stuart Legg, an Oscar-winning documentary film-maker, and his wife Margaret, daughter of barrister and law professor Sir Maurice Amos. He was educated at Horace Mann School in New York City, and Frensham Heights School in Surrey, England. After National Service in the Royal Marines from 1953 to 1955, under the military education system he read history and law at St John's College, Cambridge.

== Career ==
Legg was called to the Bar in 1960 and practised as a barrister. He was invited to join the Lord Chancellor's Department in 1962. He worked in the department for his entire career, which when he retired was responsible for administration of the UK legal system, and its co-ordination with European Union law, had resulted in the Department of Constitutional Affairs employing 20,00 staff and a budget of £2 billion. In 1989 he became permanent secretary and Clerk of the Crown in Chancery, until 1998. A Master of the Bench of the Inner Temple since 1984, he was made an honorary Queen's Counsel in 1990.

=== Inquiry chairman ===
Following his retirement from the civil service in 1998, Legg headed three key inquiries for the government. In 1998, then Cabinet Secretary Sir Robin Butler asked Legg and Robin Ibbs to conduct an inquiry into allegations that British company Sandline International was trying to sell arms to the government in exile in Sierra Leone, contravening an international embargo. In what became known as the "arms to Sierra Leone" affair, the inquiry cleared the British Government of any underhand conspiracy with Sandline, prompting accusations of a whitewash.

In 2000 he carried out a parliamentary inquiry into the huge over-spend on Portcullis House, but his report was not published.

As a member of the Audit Commission, and member of the House of Commons Audit Committee, in 2009, in the wake of the United Kingdom parliamentary expenses scandal, Legg was appointed to chair an independent panel with a remit to examine all claims relating to the second homes allowance between 2004 and 2008.

=== Other positions held ===
Alter retiring, Legg held: the chairmanship of the Imperial College Healthcare NHS Trust; served as chairman of the London Library; served as consultant to the law firm of Clifford Chance. After being co-opted onto the council of Brunel University in 1993, he was visitor from 2001 to 2006.

== Honours ==
Having previously been made a Companion of the Order of the Bath (CB), Legg was advanced to Knight Commander of the Order of the Bath (KCB) in 1992.

Legg was awarded the honorary degree of Doctor of Laws (LLD) by Brunel University in 2006.

== Private life and death ==
Legg married four times. Two marriages ended in divorce and his third wife died in 2013.

Legg died from kidney failure at his home in London on 8 October 2023, at the age of 88. He was survived by his fourth wife, Elizabeth Thompson, and by two daughters from his first marriage.

Government offices
Preceded by Derek Oulton	Permanent Secretary to the Lord Chancellor's Office; 1989–1998	Succeeded by Hayden Phillips
