= Clerk of the Crown =

Clerk who works for a royal head of state

A Clerk of the Crown is a clerk who usually works for a monarch or such royal head of state. The term is mostly used in the United Kingdom to refer to the office of the Clerk of the Crown in Chancery, though the office has undergone different titles throughout history. There are equivalent offices in Ireland and Canada.

== Clerks of the Crown ==
=== Great Britain ===
Clerk of the Crown in Chancery in Great Britain: the present Clerk of the Crown is the head of the Crown Office, which has custody of the Great Seal of the Realm, and has certain administrative functions, specially in relation to the preparation of royal documents such as warrants required to pass under the royal sign-manual, fiats, letters patent, etc.

Clerk of the Crown in Chancery in England: the office was in use from 1331 until the Acts of Union in 1707, when the office's authority expanded to Great Britain. The office was abolished during the Interregnum (1649–1660), but was re-established 1660 following the restoration of the monarchy.

Clerk of the Commonwealth: position only used during the Interregnum.
