= Thomas Willis (Clerk of the Crown in Chancery) =

Thomas Willis (1576 – 1656) was a member of the English landed gentry and Clerk of the Crown in Chancery at the outbreak of the English Civil War, owing to which he suffered the loss of his position and some of his estates. He appears in the 1619 update to the 1575 Visitation of Cambridgeshire, with reference made to his position and ownership of lands at Ashe, Hampshire.

== Biography ==
Thomas Willis was the son of Thomas Willis (or 'Willys') the elder, of Eyhall and Rouses Place in Cambridgeshire, and his wife Elizabeth, daughter of John Hasell of Dalemain, near Penrith. (Note: Thomas's brother Richard was the father of Thomas and Richard, who were each raised to the dignity of baronet, and were thus the ancestors of the two branches of the Willys baronets.)

In 1618, Willis purchased the manor of Ashe in Hampshire from its previous owner, Andrew Holdip.

Willis was a barrister, bencher of the Inner Temple; in 1626 he was a clerk of assize, and in 1629 appointed Clerk of the Crown in Chancery. On 2 March 1641, (Note: All dates are given in the Julian calendar with the start of year adjusted to 1st January (see Old Style and New Style dates)) Willis and his son Thomas were granted by Charles I the office of Clerk in Chancery, with reversion to his second son Valentine (then eight years old), the latter with power to act during his minority by deputy, to be appointed by his father or brother. Willis was serving in this capacity when the English Civil War began; he remained in London until August 1643, but was detained by royalist forces while visiting his estate in Hampshire and brought to Oxford, where he served the King until 1645. During this period, Parliament required the services of a Clerk in Chancery, and promoted Willis's deputy, John Bolles, to that status.

In 1645, following the King's defeat, Willis returned and submitted to Parliament, petitioning the House of Lords- and, upon the dissolution of that house on 19 March 1649, the House of Commons- for financial reimbursement of damages sustained to his estate by Parliamentary's forces, as well as funding for cancellation of debts resulting from this damage; he was required to take out mortgages, for which by this time he was liable to pay back, on his property at Ashe. The petition mentions that his annual fee as Clerk of the Crown was £66 13s. 4d.

In April 1654, the war having concluded in 1651, Willis tried to reclaim his position, but having been branded a delinquent by the Parliament, the office of Clerk in Chancery was granted to Nathaniel Taylor in 1655. Willis died the following year. By this time his son Thomas Willis had also died (in 1646), leaving his brother Valentine, to whom the office of Clerk in Chancery had been granted in reversion in 1641, to sue Taylor for possession of the position. After a protracted three-year dispute, Valentine Willis was admitted as Clerk of the Commonwealth in February 1660, and following the Restoration three months later, he was recognised as Clerk of the Crown.

== Family ==
Thomas and his first wife, Barbara- likely a relative of Barbara Loker (c. 1614- c. 1646), granddaughter and heir of Roger Loker, of Upton Grey, Hampshire- had a son:

- Thomas (16 February 1617 – 1646), who married March 1643/4, Katherine, daughter of politician Sir John Offley of Madeley. She subsequently married her first husband's cousin, William Willis; the Colonel of a Regiment of Horse (cavalry) under Charles I, his elder brothers, Thomas and Richard, were each created baronets of Fen Ditton.

He and his second wife, Mary, daughter of Valentine Saunders, one of the Six Clerks in Chancery, and widow of barrister Thomas Barker, of Grove House, Chiswick, had a son:

- Valentine (born 1633), a barrister of the Inner Temple, became Clerk of the Commonwealth in February 1660, and Clerk of the Crown after the Restoration.
