= Kenneth Muir Mackenzie, 1st Baron Muir Mackenzie =

British barrister, civil servant, and politician (1845–1930)

The Right Honourable The Lord Muir Mackenzie GCB PC KC

Lord-in-Waiting
- In office 1924–1930
- Monarch: George V
- Prime Minister: Ramsay MacDonald

Permanent Secretary to the Lord Chancellor's Office
- In office 1885–1915
- Appointed by: Lord Selborne
- Preceded by: new appointment
- Succeeded by: Claud Schuster

Kenneth Augustus Muir Mackenzie, 1st Baron Muir Mackenzie, GCB, PC, KC (29 June 1845 – 22 May 1930) was a British barrister, civil servant, and politician.

== Background and education ==
Muir Mackenzie was a younger son of Sir John Muir Mackenzie, 2nd Baronet, and Sophia Matilda, daughter of James Raymond Johnstone, of Alva, Clackmannanshire. He was educated at Charterhouse School and Balliol College, Oxford. In 1873 he was called to the Bar by Lincoln's Inn.

== Career ==
Muir Mackenzie was Clerk of the Crown in Chancery from 1885 to 1915 and served as Permanent Secretary to the Lord Chancellor from 1890 to 1915. He was appointed a Queen's Counsel in 1887 and a Bencher of Lincoln's Inn in 1891. He was made a CB in 1893, a KCB in 1898 and a GCB in 1911 and in 1915 he was raised to the peerage as Baron Muir Mackenzie, of Delvine in the County of Perth. In February 1924 Muir Mackenzie, then aged 78, was appointed a Lord-in-waiting (government whip in the House of Lords) by Prime Minister Ramsay MacDonald, head of the first ever Labour government, and was sworn of the Privy Council the same year. He held this position until the government fell in November 1924 and again from 1929 to 1930. At the time of his death he was the oldest government minister of the twentieth century.

== Family ==
Lord Muir-Mackenzie married Amelia, daughter of William Graham, MP, in 1874. They had one son and three daughters, one of them the violinist Dorothea Frances Muir Mackenzie(1881-1971), universally known as "Dolly", who studied with Eugène Ysaÿe and who in 1907 married the pianist Mark Hambourg. His wife died in 1900 and his only son William in 1901, aged 25 and unmarried. Muir-Mackenzie died at his home in Cumberland Terrace, Regent's Park, London, in May 1930, aged 84, and was cremated at Golders Green Crematorium. As he had no surviving male issue the barony became extinct on his death.

He is buried in Westminster Abbey.

== See also ==
- Muir Mackenzie Baronets

Government offices
Preceded by Office established	Permanent Secretary of the Lord Chancellor's Department; 1885–1915	Succeeded by Sir Claud Schuster
Peerage of the United Kingdom
New creation	Baron Muir Mackenzie; 1915–1930	Extinct
