= Derek Oulton =

Sir Derek Oulton GCB QC

Clerk of the Crown in Chancery
- In office 1982–1989
- Prime Minister: Margaret Thatcher
- Succeeded by: Thomas Legg

Personal details
- Born: 14 October 1927
- Died: 1 August 2016 (aged 88)
- Education: King's College, Cambridge
- Profession: Lawyer

Sir Antony Derek Maxwell Oulton GCB QC (14 October 1927 – 1 August 2016) was a British senior civil servant, who was Permanent Secretary of the Lord Chancellor's Department and Clerk of the Crown in Chancery, United Kingdom from 1982 to 1989.

Oulton was educated at St Edward's School, Oxford and then read law at King's College, Cambridge, where he took a double first.

He was called to the bar at Gray's Inn (where he was later a Bencher), and was in private practice as a barrister in Nairobi until 1960, when he joined the Lord Chancellor's Department. He was Private Secretary to three successive Lord Chancellors, the Earl Kilmuir, the Viscount Dilhorne, and Lord Gardiner, and also served as Secretary to the Beeching Royal Commission on Assizes and Quarter Sessions, 1966–69.

Oulton's final civil service position was as Permanent Secretary of the Lord Chancellor's Department and Clerk of the Crown in Chancery 1982–89. He was knighted in 1984, appointed Queen's Counsel in 1985 and in 1989 he was appointed Knight Grand Cross of the Order of the Bath.

He was awarded a University of Cambridge PhD degree on the basis of a jointly-authored practitioner text on legal aid and advice, and after retiring from the civil service entered academia, becoming a Research Fellow of Magdalene College, Cambridge in 1990. He subsequently became a Life Fellow and, until his retirement in June 2007, supervised undergraduate students in constitutional law. Sir Derek received a standing ovation from the College Law Society following his retirement at the Annual Lawyers' Dinner in 2007. A bench sits beside the River Cam in the grounds of the college in his honour.

On 8 May 2008, Oulton addressed the Cambridge University Gray's Inn Association, giving a talk entitled "A Life in the Law".

In 1955 Oulton married Margaret Oxley, who predeceased him in 1989, had four children by her, and died on 1 August 2016 at the age of 88.

Government offices
Preceded by Sir Wilfrid Bourne	Permanent Secretary to the Lord Chancellor's Office; 1982–1989	Succeeded by Sir Thomas Legg
