= List of 2004 British incumbents =

This is a list of 2004 British incumbents.

== UK government ==
- Monarch
  - Head of State – Elizabeth II, Queen of the United Kingdom (1952–2022)
- Prime Minister
  - Head of Government – Tony Blair, Prime Minister of the United Kingdom (1997–2007)
- Deputy Prime Minister
  - Deputy Head of Government – John Prescott, Deputy Prime Minister of the United Kingdom (1997–2007)
- First Secretary of State
  - John Prescott, First Secretary of State (1997–2007)
- First Lord of the Treasury
  - Tony Blair, First Lord of the Treasury (1997–2007)
- Minister for the Civil Service
  - Tony Blair, Minister for the Civil Service (1997–2007)
- Chancellor of the Exchequer
  - Gordon Brown, Chancellor of the Exchequer (1997–2007)
- Second Lord of the Treasury
  - Gordon Brown, Second Lord of the Treasury (1997–2007)
- Secretary of State for Foreign and Commonwealth Affairs
  - Jack Straw, Secretary of State for Foreign and Commonwealth Affairs (2001–2007)
- Secretary of State for the Home Department
  - Secretary of State for the Home Department –
    1. David Blunkett, Secretary of State for the Home Department (2001–2004)
    2. Charles Clarke, Secretary of State for the Home Department (2004–2007)
- Secretary of State for Environment, Food and Rural Affairs
  - Margaret Beckett, Secretary of State for Environment, Food and Rural Affairs (2001–2007)
- Secretary of State for Transport
  - Alistair Darling, Secretary of State for Transport (2002–2007)
- Secretary of State for Scotland
  - Alistair Darling, Secretary of State for Scotland (2003–2007)
- Secretary of State for Health
  - John Reid, Secretary of State for Health (2003–2007)
- Secretary of State for Northern Ireland
  - Paul Murphy, Secretary of State for Northern Ireland (2002–2007)
- Secretary of State for Defence
  - Geoff Hoon, Secretary of State for Defence (1999–2007)
- Secretary of State for Trade and Industry
  - Patricia Hewitt, Secretary of State for Trade and Industry (2001–2007)
- Minister for Women and Equality
  - Patricia Hewitt, Minister for Women and Equality (2001–2007)
- Secretary of State for Culture, Media and Sport
  - Tessa Jowell, Secretary of State for Culture, Media and Sport (2001–2007)
- Secretary of State for Education and Skills
  - Charles Clarke, Secretary of State for Education and Skills (2002–2007)
- Secretary of State for Wales
  - Peter Hain, Secretary of State for Wales (2002–2007)
- Lord Privy Seal
  - Peter Hain, Lord Privy Seal (2003–2007)
- Leader of the House of Commons
  - Peter Hain, Leader of the House of Commons (2003–2007)
- Lord President of the Council
  - Baroness Amos, Lord President of the Council (2003–2007)
- Lord Chancellor
  - Charles Falconer, Baron Falconer of Thoroton, Lord Chancellor (2003–2007)
- Secretary of State for Constitutional Affairs
  - Charles Falconer, Baron Falconer of Thoroton, Secretary of State for Constitutional Affairs (2003–2007)
- Secretary of State for International Development
  - Hilary Benn, Secretary of State for International Development (2003–2007)
- Secretary of State for Work and Pensions
  - Secretary of State for Work and Pensions –
    1. Andrew Smith, Secretary of State for Work and Pensions (2002–2004)
    2. Alan Johnson, Secretary of State for Work and Pensions (2004–)
- Chancellor of the Duchy of Lancaster
  - Chancellor of the Duchy of Lancaster –
    1. Douglas Alexander, Chancellor of the Duchy of Lancaster (2003–2004)
    2. Alan Milburn, Chancellor of the Duchy of Lancaster (2004–2007)

== Devolved administrations ==
- First Minister of Scotland
  - Jack McConnell (2001–2007)
- Deputy First Minister of Scotland
  - Jim Wallace (1999–2005)
- First Minister of Wales
  - Rhodri Morgan (2000–2009)

== Religion ==
- Archbishop of Canterbury
  - Rowan Williams, Archbishop of Canterbury (2003–2012)
- Archbishop of York
  - David Hope, Archbishop of York (1995–2005)

== Royalty ==
- Prince consort
  - The Duke of Edinburgh (m. 1947)
- Heir apparent
  - The Prince of Wales (since 1958)
