= Willys baronets =

Extinct baronetcy in the Baronetage of England

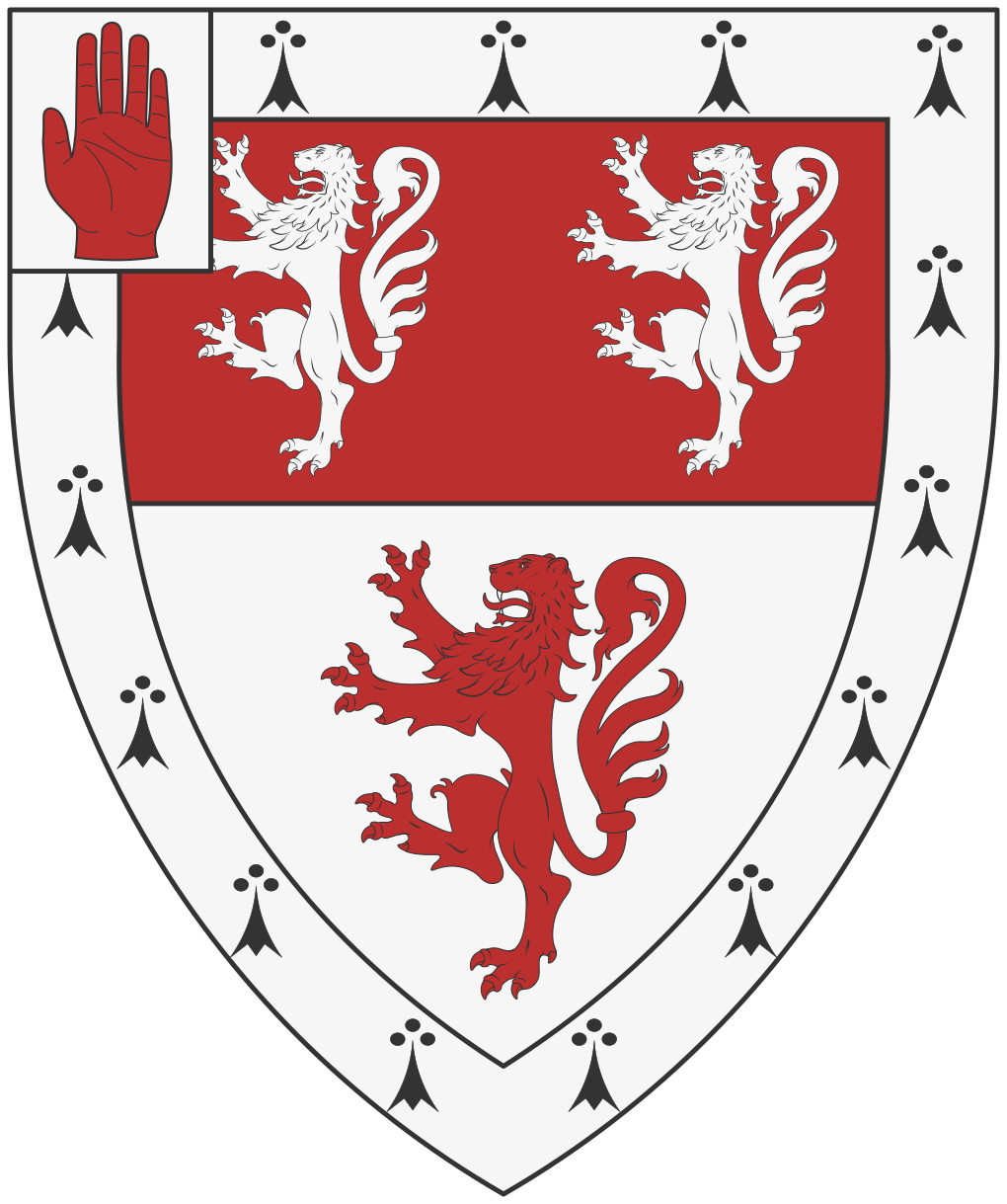
Arms of Willys of Fen Ditton

There have been two baronetcies- both extinct- granted to the Willises of Fen Ditton, both in the Baronetage of England.

The Willis (also Willys) Baronetcy, of Fen Ditton in Cambridgeshire, was first created in the Baronetage of England on 15 December 1641 for Thomas Willis (the surname often alternatively given as "Willys"), son and heir of Inner Temple barrister and landowner Richard Willys, of Fen Ditton and Horningsey, Cambridgeshire, by Jane, daughter and heir of William Henmarsh, of Ball's Park, in Ware, Hertfordshire. Richard's brother, Thomas, was Clerk of the Crown in Chancery.

Secondly, Sir Richard Willis (knighted in 1642), the younger brother of Thomas, with the same parentage, was also created Baronet of Fen Ditton (on 11 June 1646). Sir Richard, who fought as an officer in the Royalist army during the Civil War, also worked as a double-agent for Oliver Cromwell during the Interregnum and was banned from court following the Restoration, retiring to his estate having married a rich wife. Sir Richard's son Sir Thomas Fox Willis died in 1701 without issue, having been born, according to the medical notes made by his grandfather, the physician Thomas Foxe, 'bereft of his wits'; this baronetcy therefore became extinct.

The baronetcy granted to Thomas Willys passed to his son John Willys (2nd Baronet), then to his grandson Thomas Willys (3rd Baronet), but his great-grandson, also Thomas Willys (4th Baronet) died without issue in 1725; the baronetcy passed to another Thomas Willys, the 4th Baronet's first cousin once removed (the son of Sir John Willys, 2nd Baronet's younger brother, the third son William, a London merchant; his elder brother, the second son, Richard Willys, was a gentleman pensioner of the Honourable Corps of Gentlemen at Arms to King Charles II, and died unmarried). On Thomas's death in 1726 his younger brother William inherited the title, but died childless in 1732, predeceased by the only remaining heir, his first cousin, John Willys (vide infra), making the baronetcy extinct.

== Confirmation of the extinction of the 1641 baronetcy ==
The extinction of the 1641 creation was explored by Arthur J. Willis in Genealogy for Beginners. When researching his (it came to be shown) unrelated Willis ancestors, he visited the College of Arms regarding a potential link to the baronetical Willyses, and observed: 'I was told that the male line of the grandsons had died out, though there was a suggestion without evidence that the last member of the family, John, had refused the baronetcy because he was in trade and had gone North'. Looking at the Willis family pedigree in Burke's Extinct and Dormant Baronetcies (1844), he concluded: This was interesting but curiously silent about the John, grandson of the first baronet, not giving as one would expect the record of his death, only saying that his father Robert died in 1692 "leaving an only child John"... it may be taken as fairly certain that full investigation was made at the time the baronetcy lapsed, but the vagueness did lend some colour to the story related by the College of Arms.' The Victoria County History of the County of Cambridge, however, in giving an account of the ownership of the rectory estate at Histon, Cambridgeshire, notes that on Robert Willys's death in 1692, it was held by his wife, before passing to his son John, who had died, unmarried (as noted by Thomas Wotton in The English Baronets of 1727) by 1729, predeceasing Sir William Willys, 6th Baronet, to whom John devised the rectory estate and 60 acres of copyhold land. John Willys, having predeceased Sir William, could not have been his successor, explaining the baronetcy's extinction.

== Kinsmen ==
John Walpole Willis and his descendants (some of whom became Willis-Bund, e.g. John William Willis-Bund) shared ancestry with the baronets, being descended from the Cambridgeshire Willis family through his grandfather Joseph Willis of Wakefield, Yorkshire.

The anatomist, neurologist and psychologist Thomas Willis was a kinsman of the baronets; his father, Thomas, the son of another Thomas Willis (of Kennington, Oxfordshire, Berkshire prior to the 1974 boundary changes) was the steward of Great Bedwyn, Wiltshire and owned a farm there. The 6th Baronet sat as M.P. for Great Bedwyn from 1727 to 1732.

Burke's Genealogical and Heraldic History of the Commoners of Great Britain and Ireland of 1834 details the relationship between the Willys baronets and the Willis Fleming family of North Stoneham Park that descended from Thomas Willis thus: "The family of Willis claims descent from the eminent and ennobled family of Welles. Browne Willis, M.P., the celebrated antiquarian, was one of its members, and his descendants have assumed of late years the surname Fleming, for estates left to them in Hampshire, where they are now resident. In the reign of Charles II, Thomas Willis, of the Berkshire family of that name, and to which family a baronetcy was granted by King Charles I, settled in Lancashire and purchased estates in that county, which, together with others, are now in possession of Richard Willis, esq. of Halsnead Park." Browne Willis was the anatomist Thomas Willis's grandson. Richard Willis of Halsnead Park was, like Thomas Willis, a descendant of John Willis of Harborough, Leicestershire, and so came to inherit the estates there.

== Willys baronets, of Fen Ditton (1641) ==
- Sir Thomas Willys, 1st Baronet (1612–1701)
- Sir John Willys, 2nd Baronet (1636–1704)
- Sir Thomas Willys, 3rd Baronet (1674–1705)
- Sir Thomas Willys, 4th Baronet (1704–1725)
- Sir Thomas Willys, 5th Baronet (1680–1726)
- Sir William Willys, 6th Baronet (1685–1732)

Extinct on his death

== Willys baronets, of Fen Ditton (1646) ==
- Sir Richard Willis, 1st Baronet (1614–1690)
- Sir Thomas Fox Willis, 2nd Baronet (1642–1701)

Extinct on his death
