= Hayden Phillips =

English civil servant (1943–2026)

Sir Hayden Phillips GCB DL
- Born: Gerald Hayden Phillips; 9 February 1943
- Died: 10 April 2026 (aged 83)
- Education: Cambridgeshire High School for Boys; Clare College, Cambridge; Yale University
- Known for: Civil service

Sir Gerald Hayden Phillips GCB DL (9 February 1943 – 10 April 2026) was an English civil servant.

== Early life and education ==
Gerald Hayden Phillips was born on 9 February 1943. He was educated at Cambridgeshire High School for Boys, Clare College, Cambridge, and Yale University.

== Career ==
Phillips joined the Civil Service as an Assistant Principal in the Home Office in 1967, and was Economic Adviser, 1970–72, Principal 1972–74, and Assistant Secretary, and Principal Private Secretary to the Home Secretary (Roy Jenkins), 1974–76. From 1977 to 1979 he served as Deputy Chef de Cabinet to Roy Jenkins as President of the European Commission. He returned to the Home Office as Assistant Secretary from 1979 to 1981, and then as Assistant Under-Secretary of State from 1981 to 1986.

From 1986 to 1988 he was Deputy Secretary in the Cabinet Office (Management and Personnel Office, subsequently Office of the Minister for the Civil Service). From 1988 to 1992 he was Deputy Secretary in HM Treasury.

From 1992 to 1998 he was Permanent Secretary, Department for National Heritage (Department for Culture, Media and Sport from 1997). From 1998 to 2004 he was Clerk of the Crown in Chancery and Permanent Secretary of the Lord Chancellor's Department (Department for Constitutional Affairs from 2003).

He was appointed a Companion of the Order of the Bath (CB) in 1989, promoted to a Knight Commander of the same Order (KCB) in 1998, and again promoted to a Knight Grand Cross of that Order (GCB) in 2002.

== Post-civil service activity ==
After retiring, he undertook a review of the honours system in 2004. From 2006 to 2007 he undertook a review of the funding of political parties, and in 2007 chaired inter-party talks on political funding.

From 2004 to 2010 he was Chairman of the National Theatre.

From 2006 he was Chairman of the Council of Marlborough College, having been a Council member since 1997.

From 1 January 2010 he was Independent Reviewer for the Advertising Standards Authority.

Phillips played the part of Colonel Dent in the 2011 film of Jane Eyre and the part of Sir Sebastian D'ath in the 2022 James Bond film No Time to Die.

He was appointed a Deputy Lieutenant for the county of Wiltshire in 2017.

Phillips died on 10 April 2026, at the age of 83.

Government offices
Preceded by himself as Permanent Secretary, Department for National Heritage	Permanent Secretary, Department for Culture, Media and Sport; 1997	Succeeded by Sir Robin Young
Preceded by Sir Thomas Legg	Permanent Secretary to the Lord Chancellor's Office; 1998–2003	Succeeded by Office abolished
