= Privy Councillor with responsibility for the Crown Dependencies =

The responsibility of Privy Counsellor for the Crown Dependencies is currently assigned to the holder of the office of Secretary of State for Justice of the United Kingdom. In this capacity, the Secretary of State is acting as a privy counsellor, and not in their capacity as a minister of the United Kingdom government. The relationship with of the Channel Islands is "technically with the Crown", and not the United Kingdom government, and hence the responsibilities are not part of the Secretary of State for Justice's ministerial portfolio.

The relationship between us and the Crown Dependencies is a subtle one. They are dependencies of the Crown, they are not part of the United Kingdom, so the responsibilities I have for them are as a privy councillor.

— Jack Straw, Home Secretary and Privy Counsellor for the Crown Dependencies, 2 May 1997 – 8 June 2001

In relation to Crown dependency affairs, the Privy Counsellor for the Crown Dependencies is legally expected to have regard to the needs of the relevant Crown dependency government, even if they conflict with the views of the UK government. The Jersey Law Review examined the "different functions of the Home Secretary first as a Privy Councillor responsible for the affairs of Jersey and secondly as a member of the [UK] cabinet," and concluded that "there was plainly no power to refuse" to submit a Jersey law for Privy Council approval because the UK Treasury objected to it.

Between 2001 and 2007 the Lord Chancellor and then the Secretary of State for Constitutional Affairs held this responsibility.

Prior to 2001, the Home Secretary was the Privy Counsellor responsible for the Crown dependencies.
