= Wilfrid Bourne =

English barrister and civil servant

Sir John Wilfrid Bourne KCB QC (27 January 1922 – 19 October 1999), known as Sir Wilfrid Bourne, was a British lawyer and civil servant who held the position of Permanent Secretary to the Lord Chancellor's Office from 1977 to 1982.

== Family and education ==
Bourne was the second son of Robert Croft Bourne, MP for Oxford from 1924 to 1938, and Lady Hester Margaret Cairns, daughter of Wilfred Cairns, 4th Earl Cairns. Bourne's great-grandfather, the Conservative politician Hugh Cairns, had served as Lord Chancellor under Benjamin Disraeli.

He was educated at Eton College, entering as a King's Scholar and Newcastle Scholar, and was Captain of the School in 1940. He obtained a scholarship to New College, Oxford, and took a First in Mods before joining the army.

In 1958, Bourne married Elizabeth Juliet Fox, with whom he had two sons.

== Career ==
During the Second World War, Bourne served with the Rifle Brigade in North Africa, Italy, Normandy and north-west Europe. He was demobilised in 1945 and returned to the University of Oxford to read Jurisprudence, in which he obtained another First, and was awarded the Eldon Law Scholarship. He entered the Middle Temple and was called to the bar in 1948. He joined the chambers of Melford Stevenson (later a High Court judge) and served on the Oxford circuit.

Bourne entered the British Civil Service in 1956, joining the Lord Chancellor's Department, and later became Principal Assistant Solicitor (1970-1972) and Deputy Secretary (1972-1977). He was also Private Secretary to David Maxwell Fyfe, and secretary to the Law Reform Committee.

In 1977 Bourne was appointed Permanent Secretary to the Lord Chancellor's Office and Clerk of the Crown in Chancery and held both positions until his retirement in 1982.

== Honours ==
Bourne was made a Companion of the Order of the Bath (CB) in 1975 and a Knight Commander (KCB) in 1979. He became a Queen's Counsel (QC) in 1981.

Government offices
Preceded by Sir Denis Dobson	Permanent Secretary to the Lord Chancellor's Office; 1977–1982	Succeeded by Sir Derek Oulton
