= Denis Dobson =

British solicitor, barrister and civil servant

Sir Denis Dobson KCB OBE QC

Permanent Secretary to the Lord Chancellor's Department
- In office 5 April 1968 – 15 April 1977
- Appointed by: Lord Gardiner
- Preceded by: Sir George Coldstream
- Succeeded by: Sir Wilfrid Bourne

Personal details
- Born: 17 October 1908
- Died: 15 December 1995 (aged 87)
- Profession: Barrister, Solicitor, Civil Servant

Sir Denis William Dobson KCB OBE QC (17 October 1908 – 15 December 1995) was a British solicitor, barrister and civil servant who served as Permanent Secretary to the Lord Chancellor's Department and Clerk of the Crown in Chancery from 5 April 1968 to 15 April 1977.

== Life ==
Dobson was born on 17 October 1908 to William Dobson, a shipbuilder, and his wife Laura. He was admitted to Charterhouse School in 1922, matriculating to Trinity College, Cambridge in 1926. He graduated in 1930 with a first class degree in law, and was added to the rolls as a solicitor in 1933. Moving to London he spent a year in a City firm before, disenchanted, joining a company of parliamentary draftsmen. During the Second World War, Dobson served with the Royal Air Force, and was appointed an OBE in 1945.

Suffering from tuberculosis he was unable to join the legal branch of the Foreign Office, and he instead joined the Statutory Publications Office, part of HM Treasury. There the Treasury Solicitor, Sir Thomas Barnes, introduced him to Albert Napier, the Permanent Secretary to the Lord Chancellor's Office, who offered him a job. Accepting, he transferred to the Lord Chancellor's Department in April 1947, and was soon recognised as a potential future Permanent Secretary. With this in mind he qualified as a barrister, and was called to the Bar by the Middle Temple in 1951. After Napier retired, Dobson became the assistant to the new Permanent Secretary, George Coldstream, and when Coldstream retired in 1968 Dobson was made Permanent Secretary and knighted.

Dobson was made a KCB in 1969, and a Queen's Counsel in 1971. Initially a reformer, by the time he became Permanent Secretary Dobson had become more conservative in his outlook, and is believed to have prevented several Lord Chancellors from making reforming actions. This was a particularly bad time for a conservative Permanent Secretary, since the report of the Beeching Commission and the transformation of the small Lord Chancellor's Department into a fully fledged government office needed a more radical Permanent Secretary. Dobson retired in 1977, sitting as a member of the Advisory Council on Public Records until 1983, and died on 15 December 1995.

Government offices
Preceded by Sir George Coldstream	Permanent Secretary to the Lord Chancellor's Office; 1968—1977	Succeeded by Sir Wilfrid Bourne
