= Cambridgeshire High School for Boys =

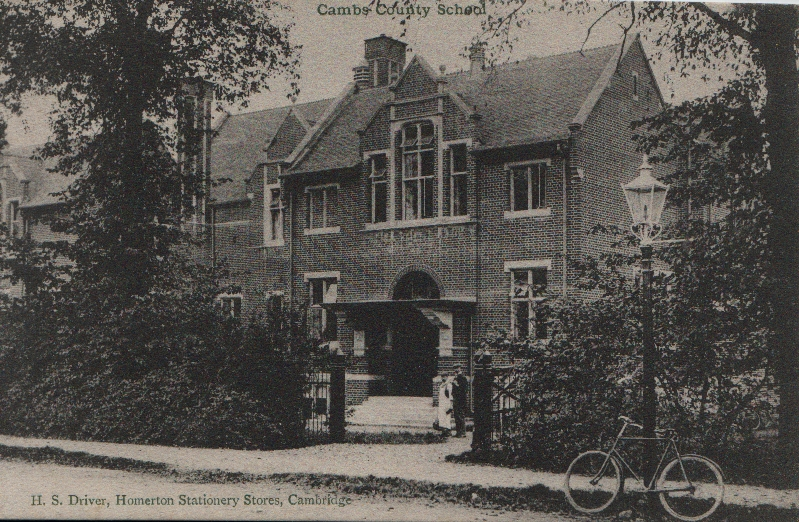

Location
- Hills Road; Cambridge, Cambridgeshire; England; 52°11′17″N 00°08′07″E

Information
- Type: Grammar school
- Established: 1900
- Closed: 1974
- Local authority: Cambridgeshire
- Gender: Boys
- Age: 11 to 18
- Destiny: Became Hills Road Sixth Form College

The Cambridgeshire High School for Boys was founded as the Cambridge and County School for Boys in Cambridge, England, in 1900.

== History ==
It was later the Cambridge and County High School for Boys, and then finally the Cambridgeshire High School for Boys. It had around 600 boys in 1970, with 150 in the sixth form. It was transformed into Hills Road Sixth Form College in the 1974 reorganisation of education in Cambridgeshire.

The Cambridgeshire High School for Girls became the Long Road Sixth Form College, also in 1974.

== Former headmasters ==
- 1900 Rev Charles John Napoleon Child
- 1917 Peter Henderson (died 1917)
- 1917 Rev Charles John Napoleon Child [acting head]
- 1919 Major C. J. R. Whitmore
- 1923 Arthur Brinley Mayne
- 1946 Brinley Newton-John (father of Olivia Newton-John)
- 1954 Arthur William Eagling
- 1969 Colin W. Hill (subsequently Principal of Hills Road Sixth Form College, 1974–1984)

== Alumni ==
- Martin Amis (author) records in his autobiography "Experience" that he attended the school while his father Kingsley Amis and his mother Hilary were living off Madingley Road.
- Roger 'Syd' Barrett of the rock band Pink Floyd attended the school. Barrett is remembered for the unprecedented way in which he resisted the school's strict code of conduct.
- Charles Benstead, cricketer and Royal Navy officer
- Sir John Bradfield – Founder of Cambridge Science Park, the first Science Park in Europe.
- Sir Steven Cowley, physicist, international authority on fusion energy.
- Peter Fluck, artist and sculptor, co-creator of the satirical TV show Spitting Image
- Sir Clive Granger, economist, won the Nobel Memorial Prize in Economic Sciences (widely referred to as the "Nobel Prize in Economics") in 2003
- Bob Klose, early member of Pink Floyd.
- Prof Norman Bertram (Freddy) Marshall, marine biologist, and Professor of Zoology from 1972–7 at Queen Mary, University of London
- Jacko Page (rugby union)
- Tony Palmer, film director and author
- David Parker, a Western Australian politician who served as Deputy Premier from 1988 until 1990.
- Sidney Peters, Liberal MP from 1929 to 1945 for Huntingdonshire
- Sir Hayden Phillips (former Permanent Secretary, Department for National Heritage/Department for Culture, Media and Sport, Lord Chancellor's Department/Department for Constitutional Affairs)
- Sir David Robinson
- William T. Stearn, botanist
- Sir Kevin Tebbit (former Permanent Secretary, Ministry of Defence
- The artist Storm Thorgerson was a contemporary and friend of Syd Barrett and Roger Waters. He was the co-founder of the Hipgnosis partnership, who designed record covers for, amongst others, Pink Floyd, Led Zeppelin, Yes, Genesis and Muse.
- William (Bill) Tutte, mathematical genius responsible for breaking the Tunny Code (the Lorenz Code), at Bletchley Park in 1941. Tunny (also known as Fish) was an extensively-used German Second World War cypher more complex than the Enigma code, used by Hitler personally. Tutte went to Cambridgeshire High School on a scholarship in 1928, aged 11, and went on to Trinity College, Cambridge in 1935. After the war he was elected a Fellow of the Royal Society.
- Roger Waters of Pink Floyd. The album The Wall allegedly draws heavily upon Waters' experience of the school. The Happiest Days of Our Lives, recalls the sadism of certain teachers, and Another Brick in the Wall part 2, which includes the famous lyrics "We don't need no education". In 2017, the 'Pink Floyd: Their Mortal Remains' exhibition at the Victoria & Albert Museum in London exhibited the punishment book for Cambridgeshire High School for Boys open at a caning for Roger Waters, along with the cane itself.

=== Former teachers ===
- Shaun Wylie, mathematician, taught at the school and Hills Road Sixth Form College for seven years after retiring from GCHQ (where he was Chief Mathematician) in 1973. He was one of the codebreakers at Bletchley Park during the Second World War. A photograph of him is on display in the National Portrait Gallery in London. He was also the Ph.D. supervisor at Cambridge of alumnus William (Bill) Tutte.
