= George Coldstream =

British barrister and civil servant

Sir George Coldstream KCB KCVO QC

Permanent Secretary to the Lord Chancellor's Department
- In office 4 June 1954 – 5 April 1968
- Nominated by: Sir Albert Napier
- Appointed by: Lord Simonds
- Preceded by: Sir Albert Napier
- Succeeded by: Sir Denis Dobson

Personal details
- Born: 20 December 1907 North Kensington, London
- Died: 19 April 2004 (aged 96) Seaford, East Sussex
- Spouse(s): Mary Carmichael (m. 1934; div. 1948) and Sheila Hope (m. 1949)
- Relations: William Coldstream (cousin) Chris Whitty (step grandson)
- Children: Grizelda (deceased) and Rosamund
- Profession: Barrister, Civil Servant

Sir George Phillips Coldstream KCB KCVO QC (20 December 1907 – 19 April 2004) was a British barrister and civil servant who served as Permanent Secretary to the Lord Chancellor's Department and Clerk of the Crown in Chancery from 4 June 1954 to 5 April 1968. Born to an upper-middle-class family, Coldstream was educated at Rugby School and Oriel College, Oxford, where he read law. In 1930 he was called to the Bar by Lincoln's Inn, but worked as a barrister for only four years before he was recruited into the Office of the Parliamentary Counsel, where he served as Assistant to the Parliamentary Counsel to the Treasury.

In 1939 he became a legal assistant in the Lord Chancellor's Department, and in 1944 became Deputy Permanent Secretary to the Lord Chancellor's Department. When Sir Albert Napier retired as Permanent Secretary in 1954, Coldstream (his deputy) succeeded him, as per convention. As Permanent Secretary Coldstream served under four Lord Chancellors and was described as "one of the 10 men who run Britain". He helped draft the Life Peerages Act 1958, the Peerage Act 1963 and what became the Royal Assent Act 1967.

He also served on the Beeching Commission, helped create the Law Commission and played a part in appointing judges now recognised as particularly influential, including Lords Denning, Devlin and Diplock. After retirement on 5 April 1968, Coldstream continued to advise the government, and served as chairman of the Council of Legal Education from 1970 to 1973. He died on 19 April 2004 in Seaford, East Sussex. He was appointed as Knight Commander of the Order of the Bath, Knight Commander of the Royal Victorian Order and Queen's Counsel.

== Early life and education ==
Coldstream was born on 20 December 1907 in North Kensington, London to Francis Menzies Coldstream, a stockbroker, and his wife Carlotta Mary Young. In 1921 he began to attend Rugby School, and matriculated to Oriel College, Oxford in 1926 to read law. After gaining a second class honours in Jurisprudence he left in 1929, planning to become a barrister, and was called to the Bar by Lincoln's Inn in November 1930.

== Early career ==
Coldstream started his career practising as a barrister, but after four years was hired by the Office of the Parliamentary Counsel, the civil service body tasked with drafting Bills for the Parliament of the United Kingdom. From 1934 to 1937 he served as Assistant to the Parliamentary Counsel to the Treasury, and in 1939 he was transferred to the Lord Chancellor's Department to serve as a legal assistant. In 1944 he became Deputy Clerk of the Crown and Assistant Permanent Secretary. Between 1944 and 1946 he served as a member of the British War Crimes Executive, preparing files for the Nuremberg Trials in which he played a significant role, and from 1947 to 1953 he sat on the Evershed Committee. In 1948 he was Secretary of the Inter-Party Conference on House of Lords Reform. When Sir Albert Napier retired as Permanent Secretary on 4 June 1954, Coldstream succeeded him.

== Permanent Secretary ==
As Permanent Secretary Coldstream served with distinction, and played a part in some of the most important reforms of his era, as well as executing his normal duties. In 1958 he helped prepare the Life Peerages Act, which built directly on the findings of the 1948 Inter-Party Conference, and was also partly responsible for the Peerage Act 1963. After consultation with the Lord Chancellor he helped write the Royal Assent Act 1967, and although he privately disagreed with it he also supervised the team drafting the Law Commission Act 1965, which established the Law Commission. At the same time he supervised and influenced judicial appointments.

During his tenure as Permanent Secretary, Coldstream saw Lords Denning, Devlin, Diplock and Wilberforce be made Law Lords, and Lords Parker, Dankwerts and Russell take up seats as Lord Justices of Appeal. In 1966 he helped prepare the Beeching Commission on Quarter Sessions, and served as a member until it finished its report in 1969. From 1970 to 1973 he sat as chairman of the Council of Legal Education. He was an Honorary Fellow of the American College of Trial Lawyers, and spent some time as a consultant to the American Institute of Judicial Administration. He retired in 1968, long before his mandatory retirement date, and moved to Seaford, East Sussex, where he died on 19 April 2004.

Government offices
Preceded by Sir Albert Napier	Permanent Secretary to the Lord Chancellor's Office; 1954–1968	Succeeded by Sir Denis Dobson
