= William Sloper (died 1743) =

English officeholder and politician

William Sloper (c. 1658 – 14 January 1743) of West Woodhay House, Berkshire, England was an English officeholder and politician who sat in the House of Commons between 1715 and 1743.

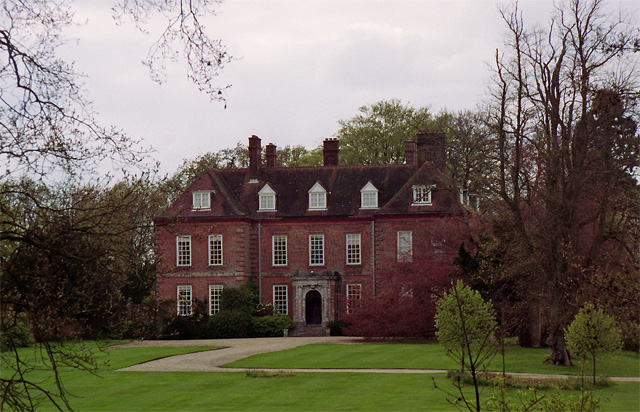
West Woodhay Hall

Sloper was the son of William Sloper of Great Bedwyn, Wiltshire. He matriculated at New College, Oxford on 5 June 1679, aged 20 and was awarded B.A. from Gloucester Hall in 1683. He married Rebecca Abbott before 1708.

Sloper was appointed Clerk to the Paymaster General by 1702, was Deputy Paymaster General from 1714 to 1720 and Deputy Cofferer of the Household by 1730 until his death. In 1714 he bought the West Woodhay House estate in West Berkshire.

Sloper was returned unopposed as Member of Parliament for Great Bedwyn at the 1715 general election. At the 1722 general election he was returned unopposed as MP for Camelford, Cornwall. He was defeated at the poll at Great Bedwyn at the 1727 general election, but was returned on petition on 26 March 1729. He was re-elected for Bedwyn at the 1734 general election. He did not stand at the 1741 general election but was brought in as MP for Whitchurch, Hampshire at a by-election on 2 January 1742.

Sloper died on 14 January 1743, leaving two sons by his wife Rebecca. His son and heir William was also an MP for Great Bedwyn and was involved in a notorious affair with the actress Susannah Maria Cibber.

Parliament of Great Britain
Preceded by Thomas Millington; Sir Edward Seymour	Member of Parliament for Great Bedwyn; 1715–1722; With: Stephen Bisse	Succeeded by Robert Bruce; Charles Longueville
Preceded by James Montagu; Richard Coffin	Member of Parliament for Camelford; 1722–1727; With: The Earl of Drogheda	Succeeded by Thomas Hales; John Pitt
Preceded by Sir William Willys; Viscount Lewisham	Member of Parliament for Great Bedwyn; 1729–1741; With: Sir William Willys 1729–1732; Francis Seymour 1732–1734; Robert Murray 1734–1738; Edward Popham 1738–1741	Succeeded by Sir Edward Turner; Lascelles Metcalfe
Preceded by John Selwyn; John Wallop	Member of Parliament for Whitchurch; 1742–1743; With: John Selwyn	Succeeded by John Selwyn; Charles Clarke
