= Sir William Willys, 6th Baronet =

Sir William Willys, 6th Baronet (c. 1685–1732) was a British politician who sat in the House of Commons from 1727 to 1732.

Willys was the second son of William Willys of Austin Friars, and his wife Catherine Gore, daughter of Robert Gore merchant of Chelsea and widow of George Evelyn. His father was the fourth son of Sir Thomas Willys, 1st Baronet and was a London merchant trading with Hamburg. Willys succeeded his brother in the baronetcy, which came to him from a cousin, on 17 July 1726. His nephew Matthew Michell was MP for Westbury from 1748 to 1752.

Willys was returned as Member of Parliament for Newport (Isle of Wight) at a by-election on 31 January 1727. At the 1727 general election he stood instead at Great Bedwyn, probably with the support of his brother-in-law Francis Stonehouse, and topped the poll. Stonehouse was a former MP and had married Willys’ half-sister Mary Evelyn. Willys voted consistently with the Administration as long as he was in Parliament.

Willys died unmarried on 14 April 1732 and the baronetcy became extinct.

Parliament of Great Britain
Preceded by Colonel Charles Cadogan; George Huxley	Member of Parliament for Newport (Isle of Wight); 1727; With: George Huxley	Succeeded by William Fortescue; George Huxley
Preceded by Robert Bruce; Charles Longueville	Member of Parliament for Great Bedwyn; 1727–1732; With: Viscount Lewisham 1727-1729; William Sloper 1729-1732	Succeeded by Francis Seymour; William Sloper
Baronetage of England
Preceded by Thomas Willys	Baronet (of Fen Ditton); 1726-1732	Extinct
