= Charles Benstead =

English cricketer, Royal Navy officer, and author

Personal information
- Full name: Charles Richard Benstead
- Born: 21 April 1896; Cambridge, Cambridgeshire, England
- Died: 3 July 1980 (aged 84); Solihull, Warwickshire, England
- Batting: Right-handed
- Bowling: Right-arm medium

Domestic team information
- Years: Team
- 1920–1921: Cambridge University
- 1921–1923: Cambridgeshire

Career statistics
| Competition | First-class |
|---|---|
| Matches | 3 |
| Runs scored | 28 |
| Batting average | 9.33 |
| 100s/50s | –/– |
| Top score | 16 |
| Balls bowled | 470 |
| Wickets | 11 |
| Bowling average | 23.54 |
| 5 wickets in innings | 1 |
| 10 wickets in match | – |
| Best bowling | 5/37 |
| Catches/stumpings | 2/– |
- Source: Cricinfo, 19 July 2019

Charles Richard Benstead MC (21 April 1896 – 3 July 1980) was an English first-class cricketer, Royal Navy officer and author. Benstead served in the Royal Garrison Artillery during the First World War, during which he was awarded with the Military Cross. Following the war he played first-class cricket while studying at the University of Cambridge, before joining the Royal Navy after his graduation. He served in the navy from 1922–46, playing first-class cricket for the Royal Navy Cricket Club. Following his retirement, he wrote several books and became associated in the running of St Catharine's College, Cambridge.

== Early life and First World War service ==
Benstead was born at Cambridge in April 1896, where he was educated at the Cambridge and County High School. From there he went up to study mathematics at St Catharine's College, Cambridge in 1914. From 1916 he served in the First World War, being commissioned as a second lieutenant with the Royal Garrison Artillery. He was the subject of a famous propaganda poster during the war, where Benstead was stood silhouetted against firing guns. He was mentioned in dispatches during the Battle of Passchendaele and was awarded the Military Cross for actions during the Battle of Amiens in 1918.

He returned to study at Cambridge following the war, playing two first-class matches for Cambridge University against the Marylebone Cricket Club (MCC) in 1920 and Somerset in 1921. Against the MCC he took figures of 5 for 37 in the MCC second-innings, his only first-class five wicket haul. While at Cambridge he did not gain a blue. In addition to playing first-class cricket while at Cambridge, he also played minor counties cricket for Cambridgeshire from 1921–23, making twelve appearances in the Minor Counties Championship.

== Naval career and later life ==
After graduating from Cambridge, Benstead joined the Instructor Branch of the Royal Navy as a temporary instructor lieutenant in September 1922. He made a single appearance in first-class cricket for the Royal Navy against the British Army cricket team at Lord's in 1923. He became a full lieutenant in May 1926, with promotion to the rank of instructor lieutenant commander in September 1928. He was promoted to the rank of instructor commander in September 1936. Benstead retired from active service in April 1946.

Upon his retirement he moved back to Cambridge, where he renewed his association with St Catharine's College. He was nominated by the college to be pro-proctor in 1947–48 and served as senior proctor in 1948–49. He also served as domestic bursar in 1948–49, before serving as steward from 1948–55. He was president of the St Catharine's Society in 1960–61. As part of the college's 500th anniversary celebrations in 1973, Benstead was elected as an honorary fellow. Throughout his life he wrote several well known books, including the critically acclaimed Retreat: A Story of 1918, published in 1930. He suffered from increasing ill health in his later years, moving with his wife from Cambridge to be nearer their daughter. Benstead died at Solihull in July 1980.
