= Clerk of the Crown in Chancery =

Senior British civil servant

Clerk of the Crown in Chancery in Great Britain
- Incumbent; Jo Farrar since July 2025
- Ministry of Justice
- Appointer: The Monarch; on advice of the Prime Minister
- Inaugural holder: Benedict Normanton
- Formation: occ. 1331
- Deputy: Ceri King; Deputy Clerk of the Crown in Chancery

The Clerk of the Crown in Chancery in Great Britain is a senior civil servant who is the head of the Crown Office.

The Crown Office, a section of the Ministry of Justice, has custody of the Great Seal of the Realm, and has certain administrative functions in connection with the courts and the judicial process, as well as functions relating to the electoral process for House of Commons elections, to the keeping of the Roll of the Peerage, and to the preparation of royal documents such as warrants required to pass under the royal sign-manual, fiats, letters patent, etc.

== History ==
The position evolved from the mediaeval office of the Chancery. The first individual known to be designated as Clerk of the Crown in Chancery was Benedict Normanton in 1331. After 1384, it became common for two persons to hold the clerkship in two separate offices, and in some cases two persons held one of the offices in survivorship.

From 1885 onwards, the office of Clerk of the Crown in Chancery has always been held by the Permanent Secretary to the Lord Chancellor's Department (now the Ministry of Justice). The Clerk of the Crown is formally appointed by the monarch under the royal sign-manual; they must take an oath before assuming the office, which is now administered by the Lord Chancellor.

== Responsibilities ==
Since 1885, the office of Clerk of the Crown in Chancery has been combined with that of Permanent Secretary to the Lord Chancellor's Department (now the Ministry of Justice). The Clerk of the Crown in Chancery is appointed by the Monarch under the royal sign-manual.

All formal royal documents (such as warrants to be signed by the monarch; letters patent, both those that are signed by the King himself and those that are approved by warrant; and royal charters) are prepared by the Crown Office.

The Crown Office is also responsible for sealing with the Great Seal of the Realm all documents that need to pass under that seal, once the authority for the use of the seal is signified by the Sovereign (authorisation to use the Seal is granted either by the monarch signing a warrant that approves the draft text of letters patent, directs that they be prepared and authorises them to be sealed and issued; or by the Sovereign directly signing the letters patent that are to pass under the great seal, as is necessary in some cases, such as with letters patent that grant Royal Assent to bills passed by Parliament and with instruments of consent relating to royal marriages).

The Clerk of the Crown in Chancery discharges his or her functions regarding the use of the Great Seal and the preparation of royal warrants, letters patent, etc., under the direction of the Lord Chancellor, who is the keeper of the Great Seal of the Realm.

The Crown Office is also responsible for maintaining and updating the Roll of the Peerage. The Secretary of State for Justice is the keeper of the Peerage Roll, and his duties in that regard are daily discharged by a Registrar of the Peerage and a Deputy Registrar, who work within the Crown Office and are therefore under the supervision of the Clerk of the Crown in Chancery. The duties of the Ministry of Justice regarding the keeping and maintenance of the Roll of the Peerage are discharged in collaboration with the Garter King of Arms and Lord Lyon King of Arms, regarding their respective heraldic jurisdictions. The Crown Office also compiles the Official Roll of the Baronetage.

The Crown Office also has duties relating to the elections for the House of Commons. The Clerk of the Crown in Chancery initiates a parliamentary election in a constituency by sending an election writ to the returning officer of the constituency, and historically received all ballot papers and ballot stubs after the election was complete though they are now kept locally by the registration officer for each area (and retained for a year).

The Clerk issues election writs to the relevant returning officer for each constituency, whenever the King makes a proclamation dissolving parliament, and issues an election writ to a specific constituency whenever that constituency's seat is certified as vacant. The Clerk then receives the completed election writs, from the returning officer, after the results are declared. These completed writs are used to create a Return Book, listing the names of all those who are returned as members of the House of Commons in a general election, and delivers that book to the Clerk of the House of Commons on the first day of a new parliament.

== List of Clerks of the Crown ==
Clerk of the Crown in Chancery
#	Portrait	Name (Note: Including honorifics and constituencies for elected MPs.) (Birth–Death)	Term of office (Note: Dates provided for the end of a term are either retirement/resignation or death; when only the year is provided the exact date is unknown.)		Office	Concurrent office(s)	Ref.
1		Benedict Normanton (n/a)	occ.4 August 1331	1350	Clerk of the Crown in Chancery in England	—	
2		John (de) Tamworth (died c. 1374)	20 February 1350	1374–1376	Clerk of the Crown in Chancery in England (Note: John Tamworth is presumed to have died in 1374, but no grant of office of Clerk of the Crown was issued until Geoffrey Martin's (1 January 1376).)	—	
3		Geoffrey Martin (n/a)	1 January 1376	1396	Clerk of the Crown in Chancery in England	—	
4		Edmund Brudenell (n/a)	30 July 1380	1385	Clerk of the Crown in Chancery in England	—	
4		Edmund Brudenell (n/a)	10 April 1384	1385	Clerk of the Crown in Chancery in England	—	
5		James (de) Billingford (died 1409)	2 December 1385	13 March 1396	Clerk of the Crown in Chancery in England	—	
5		James (de) Billingford (died 1409)	13 March 1396	1409^{[†]}	Chief Clerk of the Crown in Chancery in England	—	
6		John Clerk (n/a)	13 March 1396	1409^{[†]}	Secondary Clerk of the Crown in Chancery in England	—	
6		John Clerk (n/a)	6 February 1409	17 October 1415	Clerks of the Crown in Chancery in England (Note: John Clerk and William Champneys were each granted offices as one of the Clerks of the Crown (6 February 1409), with John Clerk holding a higher salary.)	—	
7		William Champneys (n/a)	6 February 1409	1415	Clerks of the Crown in Chancery in England	—	
8		Richard Sturgeon (n/a)	8 April 1415	17 October 1415	Clerk of the Crown in Chancery in England (Note: Richard Sturgeon (until 17 October 1415) served as Clerk of the Crown alongside John Clerk, who held higher salary.)	—	
8		Richard Sturgeon (n/a)	17 October 1415	12 August 1449	Clerks of the Crown in Chancery in England (Note: Richard Sturgeon and Sir Thomas Haseley were each granted offices as one of the Clerks of the Crown (17 October 1415), with Richard Sturgeon holding a higher salary.)	—	
9		Sir Thomas Haseley^{[‖]} (died 1449)	17 October 1415	24 December 1448	Clerks of the Crown in Chancery in England	—	
9		Sir Thomas Haseley^{[‖]} (died 1449)	24 December 1448	23 May 1449^{[†]}	Clerk of the Crown in Chancery in England (Note: Sir Thomas Haseley and Thomas Ive were granted the office of Clerk of the Crown in survivorship (24 December 1448). Thomas Ive had previously been granted the office of Clerk of the Crown in reversion after Sir Thomas Haseley (17 October 1415).)	—	
10		Thomas Ive (n/a)	24 December 1448	20 April 1461	Clerk of the Crown in Chancery in England	—	
10		Thomas Ive (n/a)	20 April 1461	21–23 May 1481^{[†]}	Clerk of the Crown in Chancery in England	—	
11		William Rous (died 1470)	12 August 1449	12 October 1470^{[†]}	Clerk of the Crown in Chancery in England (Note: William Rous was granted the office of Clerk of the Crown in reversion after Richard Sturgeon (25 May 1443), and served (until 12 October 1470) alongside Thomas Ive.)	—	
12		John Bagot (n/a)	12 October 1470	1499	Clerk of the Crown in Chancery in England (Note: John Bagot was granted the office of Clerk of the Crown in survivorship with William Swerendon in reversion after Robert Rous (19 October 1461), and later the same office in survivorship with the same in reversion after William Rous (22 June 1464). William Swerendon's will had been proven by 1469; John Bagot was granted of the office alone in possession during pleasure upon William Rous' death (12 October 1470).)	—	
13		Richard Ive (died 1487)	21 May 1481	19 September 1485	Clerk of the Crown in Chancery in England (Note: Richard Ive was granted the office of Clerk of the Crown in reversion after his father, Thomas Ive (16 September 1473) He was granted the office in possession upon his father's death (21 May 1481), and later granted of the office during pleasure (3 July 1483).)	—	
13		Richard Ive (died 1487)	19 September 1485	10 November 1487^{[†]}	Clerk of the Crown in Chancery in England (Note: Richard Ive and Gilbert Bacheler were granted the office of Clerk of the Crown in survivorship (19 September 1485). Gilbert Bacheler had been granted the office of Clerk of the Crown on the same date, though this appointment is believed to have been a mistake and is not known to have taken effect.)	—	
14		Gilbert Bacheler (died 1500)	19 September 1485	1485	Clerk of the Crown in Chancery in England	—	
14		Gilbert Bacheler (died 1500)	10 November 1487	29 October 1500	Clerk of the Crown in Chancery in England (Note: Gilbert Bacheler and Clement Clerk were granted office as Clerks of the Crown in survivorship(10 November 1487).)	—	
15		Clement Clerk (died 1504)	10 November 1487	1504	Clerk of the Crown in Chancery in England	—	
16		William Porter (died 1522)	12 November 1504	4 March 1522^{[†]}	Clerk of the Crown in Chancery in England	—	
17		Ralph Pexall (died 1537)	6 March 1522	15–16 July 1537^{[†]}	Clerk of the Crown in Chancery in England	—	
18		Sir Thomas Pope (c. 1507–1559)	15–16 July 1537	26 February 1538	Clerk of the Crown in Chancery in England (Note: Sir Thomas Pope was granted office as Clerk of the Crown in reversion after Ralph Pexsall (5 October 1532). He succeeded to the office upon Ralph Pexsall's death 15–16 July 1537.)	—	
18		Sir Thomas Pope (c. 1507–1559)	28 February 1538	1544	Clerks of the Crown in Chancery in England (Note: Sir Thomas Pope and John Lucas were granted office as Clerks of the Crown (28 February 1538). The first surrendered the office (9 April 1544).)	—	
19		John Lucas (died 1556)	28 February 1538	1544	Clerks of the Crown in Chancery in England	—	
20		Edmund Martin (n/a)	9 April 1544	20 July 1546	Clerk of the Crown in Chancery in England	—	
20		Edmund Martin (n/a)	20 July 1546	1579^{[†]}	Clerks of the Crown in Chancery in England (Note: Martin Edmund and Thomas Powle (I) were granted office as Clerks of the Crown 20 July 1546.) (Note: Thomas Powle (II) was granted office as Clerk of the Crown in reversion after his father, Thomas Powle (I) 2 May 1579. He predeceased his father.) (Note: Rowland Watson was granted office as Clerk of the Crown in reversion after Thomas Powle (I) and (II) (3 June 1589). He predeceased both of them (3 July 1595).)	—	
21		Thomas Powle (I) (1514–1601)	20 July 1546	26 July 1601^{[†]}	Clerks of the Crown in Chancery in England	—	
22		Sir George Coppin (died 1620)	26 July 1601	1 March 1620^{[†]}	Clerk of the Crown in Chancery in England (Note: Sir George Coppin was granted office as Clerk of the Crown in reversion after Thomas Powle (I) (31 January 1597). He succeeded to the office upon Thomas Powle (I)'s death (26 July 1601).) (Note: Miles Raynsford was granted office as Clerk of the Crown in reversion after Sir George Coppin (23 June 1603). He predeceased Coppin.)	—	
23		Sir Thomas Edmondes (1563–1639)	1 March 1620	11 June 1629	Clerk of the Crown in Chancery in England (Note: Sir Thomas Edmondes was granted office as Clerk of the Crown in reversion after Sir George Coppin (6 May 1604). He succeeded to the office upon Sir George Coppin's death 1 March 1620.) (Note: Anthony and Thomas Luther were granted the office of Clerk of the Crown in Chancery in survivorship in reversion after Sir George Coppin and Thomas Edmondes (11 June 1610). They both surrendered the office (12 June 1629).)	—	
24		Thomas Willis (1576–1656)	13 June 1629	occ. 1646	Clerk of the Crown in Chancery in England (Note: Richard Beringer was granted office as Clerk of the Crown in reversion after Thomas Willis (12 April 1636). He later surrendered the office 12 May 1636.) (Note: Sir Arthur Mainwaring and Andrew Pitcairn were granted the office of Clerk of the Crown in survivorship in reversion after Thomas Willis and Richard Beringer (12 April 1636). They both surrendered the office (12 May 1636).) (Note: Thomas Willis (1617–1646), was granted office as Clerk of the Crown in reversion after his father of the same name (2 March 1641). He predeceased his father.)	—	
25		John Bolles (n/a)	12 December 1643	occ. April; 1654	Clerk of the Crown in Chancery in England (Note: John Bolles was appointed to office as Clerk of the Crown by Parliament (12 December 1643). He was previously serving as Thomas Willis' deputy.)	—	
26		Nathaniel Taylor (n/a)	15 November 1655	1659–1660	Clerk of the Commonwealth	—	
27		Valentine Willis (n/a)	10 February 1660	April; 1660	Clerk of the Commonwealth (Note: Valentine Willis was granted office as Clerk of the Crown in reversion after his father and his brother, both named Thomas Willis (2 March 1641). He became entitled to the office upon his father's death in 1656. He was later admitted as Clerk of the Commonwealth (10 February 1660), and recognised as Clerk of the Crown (April 1660), though he later surrendered the latter office (30 June 1660).)	—	
27		Valentine Willis (n/a)	April; 1660	30 June 1660	Clerk of the Crown in Chancery in England	—	
28		Henry Barker (n/a)	19 July 1660	22 February 1692	Clerk of the Crown in Chancery in England (Note: Sir Peter Apsley was granted office as Clerk of the Crown in reversion after Henry Barker (5 July 1667). He predeceased Henry Barker (10 January 1692), who later surrendered the office.)	—	
29		Thomas Chute (died 1701)	22 February 1692	17 May1701	Clerk of the Crown in Chancery in England	—	
30		George Wright (n/a)	17 May 1701	6 March 1725^{[†]}	Clerk of the Crown in Chancery in England (until 1707)	—	
30		George Wright (n/a)	17 May 1701	6 March 1725^{[†]}	Clerk of the Crown in Chancery in Great Britain (after 1707)	—	
31		Stephen Bisse (died 1746)	6 March 1725	9 September 1746^{[†]}	Clerk of the Crown in Chancery in Great Britain (Note: Stephen Bisse and Thomas Bray were granted the office of Clerks of the Crown in survivorship after George Wright (25 November 1717). They both succeeded to the office upon George Wright's death (6 March 1725).)	—	
32		Thomas Bray (died 1737)	6 March 1725	1737^{[†]}	Clerk of the Crown in Chancery in Great Britain	—	
33		The Right Honourable; Charles Yorke; PC; MP for Reigate→ Cambridge University^{[‡]} (1722–1770)	9 September 1746	20 January 1770^{[†]}	Clerk of the Crown in Chancery in Great Britain (Note: Charles and John Yorke were granted the office of Clerk of the Crown in survivorship in reversion after Stephen Bisse (27 June 1746). They both succeeded to the office upon Stephen Bisse's death (9 September 1746).)	Lord High Chancellor (1770); Attorney General (1762–1763, 1765–1766); Solicitor General (1756–1761)	
34		The Honourable; John Yorke; MP for Higham Ferrers→ Reigate^{[‡]} (1728–1801)	9 September 1746	4 September 1801^{[†]}	Clerk of the Crown in Chancery in Great Britain	—	
35		The Right Honourable; Henry Bathurst; 3rd Earl Bathurst; KGPC (1762–1834)	4 September 1801	27 July 1834^{[†]}	Clerk of the Crown in Chancery in Great Britain (Note: Henry, Earl Bathurst and Apsley Bathurst were granted the office of Clerk of the Crown in survivorship in reversion after John Yorke (23 July 1771). They both succeeded to the office upon John Yorke's death (4 September 1801).) (Note: The Hon. William Henry John was granted office as Clerk of the Crown in reversion after Henry, Earl Bathurst and Apsley Bathurst (29 July 1805). He predeceased both of them (6 July 1832).)	Lord President of the Council (1828–1830); Secretary of State for War and the Colonies (1812–1827); Secretary of State for Foreign Affairs (1809); President of the Board of Trade (1807–1812)	
36		The Honourable; Apsley Bathurst (1769–1816)	4 September 1801	24 January 1816^{[†]}	Clerk of the Crown in Chancery in Great Britain	—	
37		Sir Denis Le Marchant; 1st Baronet (1795–1874)	30 July 1834	1834	Clerk of the Crown in Chancery in Great Britain	—	
38		Leonard Edmunds in Great Britain (died 1887)	15 November 1834	1848	Clerk of the Crown	—	
39		The Honourable; Charles Edward Pepys; Viscount Crowhurst (Note: 'Charles Edward Pepys held courtesy title as Viscount Crowhurst as heir to the Earldom of Cottenham (11 June 1850); he later succeeded as the 2nd Earl of Cottenham (29 April 1851).) died 1863	14 March 1848	1851	Clerk of the Crown in Chancery in Great Britain	—	
40		Charles Romilly (died 1887)	11 July 1851	1880	Clerk of the Crown in Chancery in Great Britain	—	
41		Ralph Charlton Palmer (died 1923)	18 September 1880	1885	Clerk of the Crown in Chancery in Great Britain	—	
42		Sir Kenneth Muir Mackenzie; GCBPCQC^{[§]} (1845–1930)	17 February 1885	1915	Clerk of the Crown in Chancery in Great Britain	Permanent Secretary to the Lord Chancellor's Office	
43		Sir Claud Schuster; KtGCBCVOQC^{[§]} (1869–1956)	5 July 1915	21 August 1944	Clerk of the Crown in Chancery in Great Britain	Permanent Secretary to the Lord Chancellor's Office	
44		The Honourable; Sir Albert Napier; KCBKCVOQC (1881–1973)	2 July 1944	1954	Clerk of the Crown in Chancery in Great Britain	Permanent Secretary to the Lord Chancellor's Office	—
45		The Honourable; Sir George Coldstream; KCBKCVOQC (1907–2004)	4 June 1954	1968	Clerk of the Crown in Chancery in Great Britain	Permanent Secretary to the Lord Chancellor's Office	
46		Sir Denis Dobson; KCBOBEQC (1908–1995)	1 April 1968	1977	Clerk of the Crown in Chancery in Great Britain	Permanent Secretary to the Lord Chancellor's Office	
47		Sir Wilfrid Bourne; KCBQC (1922–1999)	12 April 1977	1982	Clerk of the Crown in Chancery in Great Britain	Permanent Secretary to the Lord Chancellor's Office	
48		Sir Derek Oulton; GCBQC (1927–2016)	1 October 1982	1989	Clerk of the Crown in Chancery in Great Britain	Permanent Secretary to the Lord Chancellor's Office	
49		Sir Thomas Legg; KCBQC (born 1935)	18 September 1989	1998	Clerk of the Crown in Chancery in Great Britain	Permanent Secretary to the Lord Chancellor's Office	
50		Sir Hayden Phillips; GCB (born 1943)	11 April 1998	2004	Clerk of the Crown in Chancery in Great Britain	Permanent Secretary to the Lord Chancellor's Office	
50		Sir Hayden Phillips; GCB (born 1943)	11 April 1998	2004	Clerk of the Crown in Chancery in Great Britain	Permanent Secretary to the Department for Constitutional Affairs	
51		The Honourable; Sir Alexander Allan; KCB (born 1951)	2 August 2004	15 November 2007	Clerk of the Crown in Chancery in Great Britain (Note: Alexander Alan retired to assume the chairmanship of the Joint Intelligence Committee (15 November 2007).)	Permanent Secretary to the Department for Constitutional Affairs	
52		Sir Suma Chakrabarti; KCB (born 1959)	19 December 2007	2012	Clerk of the Crown in Chancery in Great Britain	Permanent Secretary to the Ministry of Justice	
53		Dame Ursula Brennan; DCB (born 1952)	12 July 2012	July; 2015	Clerk of the Crown in Chancery in Great Britain	Permanent Secretary to the Ministry of Justice	
54		Sir Richard Heaton; KCB (born 1965)	1 September 2015	August; 2020	Clerk of the Crown in Chancery in Great Britain	Permanent Secretary to the Ministry of Justice	
—		Ceri King	September; 2020	December; 2020	Acting Clerk of the Crown in Chancery in Great Britain (Note: Ceri King was the Deputy Clerk of the Crown in Chancery at the time of Sir Richard Heaton's resignation. She resumed that role after Antonia Romeo was appointed.)	Acting Permanent Secretary to the Ministry of Justice; Head of the Crown Office; Registrar of the Peerage; Registrar of the Baronetage; Deputy Clerk of the Privy Council; Head of Secretariat	—
55		Dame Antonia Romeo; DCB (born 1974)	18 January 2021	11 April 2025	Clerk of the Crown in Chancery in Great Britain	Permanent Secretary to the Ministry of Justice	
—		Amy Rees	11 April 2025	1 July 2025	Acting Clerk of the Crown in Chancery in Great Britain	Acting Permanent Secretary to the Ministry of Justice; Director General Chief Executive HMPPS	
56		Jo Farrar	1 July 2025	present	Clerk of the Crown in Chancery in Great Britain	Permanent Secretary to the Ministry of Justice	

- ^§ Elevated to the British peerage.
- ^† Died in office.
- ^‡ Elected to a new constituency in a general election.
- ^‖ Knighthood is disputed.

== Canadian Clerk of the Crown in Chancery ==
The office of Clerk of the Crown in Chancery was carried over to Canada. From 1791 to 1866, there were Clerks for both Lower Canada and Upper Canada. They carried out electoral functions similar to the British Clerk. Following Confederation in 1867, the federal government established the position of Clerk of the Crown to oversee elections. The office was amalgamated into the position of Chief Electoral Officer in 1920.
