= Albert Napier =

British civil servant

The Honourable Sir Albert Napier KCB KCVO QC

Permanent Secretary to the Lord Chancellor's Department
- In office 1944 – 4 June 1954
- Nominated by: Lord Simon
- Appointed by: Lord Simon
- Preceded by: Sir Claud Schuster
- Succeeded by: Sir George Coldstream

Personal details
- Born: 4 September 1881
- Died: 18 July 1973 (aged 91)
- Relations: Robert Napier, 1st Baron Napier of Magdala
- Education: New College, Oxford
- Profession: Barrister, civil servant

Sir Albert Edward Alexander Napier KCB KCVO QC (4 September 1881 – 18 July 1973) was a British civil servant who served as Permanent Secretary to the Lord Chancellor's Department between 1944 and 1954. The youngest son of Robert Napier, 1st Baron Napier of Magdala, Albert Napier studied at Eton College and New College, Oxford before being called to the Bar by the Inner Temple in 1909. In 1915 he became Private Secretary to the Lord Chancellor, and in 1919 Assistant Secretary to the Lord Chancellor's Office.

In 1944 he succeeded Claud Schuster as Permanent Secretary to the Lord Chancellor's Office and Clerk of the Crown in Chancery. As secretary of the Rushcliffe Committee which produced the report on legal aid and Permanent Secretary of the department tasked with enacting the proposed system, Napier has been described as the "midwife to civil legal aid". Despite this his achievements are consistently overlooked, as he came between two particularly strong and influential Permanent Secretaries, Claud Schuster and Sir George Coldstream. He retired on 4 June 1954, with Coldstream succeeding him, and died on 18 July 1973.

== Early life and education ==
Napier was born on 4 September 1881, the youngest son of Robert Napier, 1st Baron Napier of Magdala and his second wife Mary Cecelia Smythe Scott. Although he died when Napier was only eight, the career of Napier's father far overshadowed his own despite academic distinction. After being educated at Eton College, where he was a King's Scholar, Napier matriculated to New College, Oxford on an Exhibition. There he gained a first-class honours degree, and was elected Eldon Law Scholar in 1906.

== Early career ==
Napier initially worked towards a career as a barrister, and was called to the Bar by the Inner Temple in 1909. His practice did not flourish, however, and in 1915 he became Private Secretary to the Lord Chancellor. In 1916 he became Deputy Serjeant-at-Arms in the House of Lords, and in 1917 he married Gladys White, the daughter of Sir George Stuart White, with whom he had a daughter and a son, the latter of which was killed during the Second World War.

In 1919 he was appointed Assistant Secretary to the Lord Chancellor's Office and Deputy Clerk of the Crown in Chancery, a position he held until 1944, when he was appointed Permanent Secretary to the Lord Chancellor's Department and Clerk of the Crown in Chancery. appointed a Companion of the Order of the Bath on 19 October 1922 in the 1922 Dissolution Honours List.

== Permanent Secretary ==
As Permanent Secretary Napier was secretary of the Rushcliffe Committee which produced the report on legal aid, and was also tasked with enacting the proposed system through his role in the Lord Chancellor's Department. At the same time he established a new Law Reform Commission, and helped expand the size of the senior courts in England and Wales. Despite his achievements, Napier was consistently overlooked, as he came between two particularly strong and influential Permanent Secretaries, Claud Schuster and Sir George Coldstream. He was promoted Knight Commander of the Order of the Bath in the 1945 New Year Honours, and appointed King's Counsel on 21 May 1947. He retired on 4 June 1954, with Coldstream succeeding him, and was appointed Knight Commander of the Royal Victorian Order in that year's Queen's Birthday Honours. He died on 18 July 1973.

Government offices
Preceded by Sir Claud Schuster	Permanent Secretary to the Lord Chancellor's Office; 1944–1954	Succeeded by Sir George Coldstream
