= Ralph Charlton Palmer =

English barrister

Ralph Charlton Palmer (2 October 1839 – 8 September 1923) was an English barrister and civil servant who was Clerk of the Crown in Chancery from 1880 to 1885.

Palmer was born at Chesham Place, Belgravia, the son of Lt. Col. George Palmer and Elizabeth Charlotte Surtees. His grandfather was the politician George Palmer, M.P. for South Essex. He was educated at Winchester College and Balliol College, Oxford. His cousin was the Lord Chancellor Earl Selborne.

Palmer died aged 83 at his home, Hubbards, in Nazeing, Essex.
