= Clerk of the Commonwealth =

Clerk of the Commonwealth in Chancery
- Coat of Arms of the Protectorate (1653–1659)
- Appointer: Lord Protector
- Formation: occ. 15 November 1655
- First holder: Nathaniel Taylor
- Final holder: Valentine Willis
- Abolished: May 1660

The Clerk of the Commonwealth in Chancery (sometimes referred to as Clerk in Chancery) was a position during the Interregnum which resembled the Clerk of the Crown.

== History ==
Following the abolition of the Monarchy and the establishment of a republic (the Commonwealth of England), the office of Clerk of the Crown in Chancery was abolished; John Bolles was the last known Clerk of the Crown, but disappeared after April 1654.

The office of Clerk of the Crown had been granted to Valentine Willis in reversion after his father, Thomas Willis. He was known to have continued to serve as Clerk of the Crown until at least 1646, though John Bolles had assumed office as Clerk of the Crown pursuant to an appointment made by Parliament in 1643.

On 15 November 1655, Nathaniel Taylor was granted during good behaviour of the office of Clerk of the Commonwealth, in direct disregard with the grant previously given to Valentine Willis, who was entitled to the office following his father's death in 1656. This started a years long legal battle between the 2 for the said office; Taylor was admitted on the next day. Taylor is recorded to have been active at the time of Thomas Willis' death. He later attended Oliver Cromwell's funeral in 1658 as part of the procession.

Valentine, who at this time was a claimant to the office of Clerk in Chancery, attended the Committee of Safety on 13 June 1659. Both Taylor and Willis were said to have attended the Council of State on 15 June of the same year.

Willis was finally admitted as Clerk of the Commonwealth on 10 February 1660. Taylor is known to have left office by 1660, having been paid on 29 September 1659. Following the restoration of the monarchy, Willis was recognized as Clerk of the Crown in April 1660. This marked the last time the office of Clerk of the Commonwealth was used, restoring back to its original name of Clerk of the Crown in Chancery.

== List of Clerks of the Commonwealth ==
Clerk of the Commonwealth in Chancery
#	Portrait	Name (Birth–Death)	Term of office		Office	Ref.
1		Nathaniel Taylor (n/a)	15 November 1655	1659–1660	Clerk of the Commonwealth in Chancery	
2		Valentine Willis (n/a)	10 February 1660	April; 1660	Clerk of the Commonwealth in Chancery	
