= Permanent Secretary to the Lord Chancellor's Office =

The Permanent Secretary to the Lord Chancellor's Department was the most senior civil servant in the Lord Chancellor's Department and a senior member of Her Majesty's Civil Service. Officially titled Her Majesty's Permanent Under-Secretary of State to the Lord Chancellor's Department (although the full title was rarely used) the Permanent Secretary oversaw the day-to-day running of the Department. The position ceased to exist in 2003 when the Lord Chancellor's Department was subsumed into the newly created Department for Constitutional Affairs, which became the Ministry of Justice in 2007. Despite existing for 118 years the position was held by only nine individuals, most notably Claud Schuster who served as Permanent Secretary for 29 years under 10 different Lord Chancellors.

== History ==
The position was created in 1885 by Lord Selborne, who was the Lord Chancellor at the time and decided to rearrange the offices in the Lord Chancellor's Department, justifying this by pointing out that:

The Lord Chancellor, though Minister of Justice for almost every purpose unconnected with the Criminal Law, had no assistance of the kind given to the other chief Departments of State, either of permanent secretaries or under secretaries. The officers attached to him were personal and liable to change with every change of government.. but on each change of government the lack of continuity was more or less felt; and as the Lord Chancellor's Department work had a constant tendency to increase, the pressure of that lack increased with it.

As well as creating the position of Permanent Secretary Selborne's reforms also unified that position with the title of Clerk of the Crown in Chancery. The first Permanent Secretary was Kenneth Muir Mackenzie, who had served as Principal Secretary before the reforms. Mackenzie's tenure as Permanent Secretary was marked by traditionalism and cronyism; he refused to use shorthand or typewriting, only employed those who did not oppose him and refused to delegate duties to his subordinates. As such when Claud Schuster was appointed in 1915 he found "a lack of method for the discharge of the ordinary business of the Department and the complete absence of any organisation for a continuous examination of the functions which the department supervised and for laying plans for the future". He immediately attempted to reform the department, expanding the staff and introducing the use of shorthand and typewriters. During his time as Permanent Secretary Schuster showed a greater ability to delegate than his predecessor, and when he left in 1944 the Lord Chancellor's Department was "running like a well-oiled machine". The position underwent greater reform after the Courts Act 1971 came into effect, and was finally abolished after the merger of the Lord Chancellor's Department into the Department for Constitutional Affairs, with the last holder of the office (Sir Hayden Phillips) becoming Permanent Secretary of the Department for Constitutional Affairs.

== Duties ==
The Permanent Secretary was required to have "an unusual degree of ability, energy and tact", The Fulton Committee defined a Permanent Secretary's duties as:

- To be the Minister's most immediate adviser on policy.
- To be the managing director of the day-to-day operations of the department.
- To hold the ultimate responsibility for questions of staff and organisation.
- To be the Accounting Officer and as such to hold the ultimate responsibility for all departmental expenditure.

Despite his position in the Lord Chancellor's Department the Permanent Secretary was in theory politically neutral, and could not be seen to be influencing legislature or judicial appointments. As well as advising on policy the Permanent Secretary was also to be consulted (since the time of William Ewart Gladstone) whenever a question of public expenditure arose.

== Holders of the office ==
Appointed by	Name	Term of office	Notes
Roundell Palmer, 1st Earl of Selborne	Kenneth Muir Mackenzie	4 March 1885 – 5 July 1915	
Richard Haldane, 1st Viscount Haldane	Claud Schuster	5 July 1915 – 1944	
John Simon, 1st Viscount Simon	Albert Napier	1944 – 4 June 1954	
Gavin Simonds, 1st Baron Simonds	George Coldstream	4 June 1954 – 5 April 1968	
Gerald Gardiner, Baron Gardiner	Denis Dobson	5 April 1968 – 15 April 1977	
Elwyn Jones, Baron Elwyn-Jones	Wilfrid Bourne	15 April 1977 – 1 October 1982	
Quintin Hogg, Baron Hailsham of St Marylebone	Derek Oulton	1 October 1982 – 18 September 1989	
James Mackay, Baron Mackay of Clashfern	Thomas Legg	18 September 1989 – 11 April 1998	
Derry Irvine, Baron Irvine of Lairg	Hayden Phillips	11 April 1998 – 12 June 2003	

== Bibliography ==
- Hall, Jean Graham; Douglas F. Martin (2003). Yes, Lord Chancellor: A Biography of Lord Schuster. Chichester, West Sussex: Barry Rose Law Publishers. ISBN 1-902681-35-5.
- Heuston, Robert (1964). Lives of the Lord Chancellors 1940-70. Clarendon Press.
