= Sir Richard Willis, 1st Baronet =

Sir Richard Willis, 1st Baronet (sometimes spelt 'Willys') (13 January 1614 – December 1690) was a Royalist officer during the English Civil War, and a double agent working for the Parliamentarians during the Interregnum.

== Early life ==
Willis was the younger brother of Thomas Willys, both being sons of Richard Willys, a lawyer and Lord of the Manors of Fen Ditton and Horningsey, Cambridgeshire, by Jane, daughter and heir of William Henmarsh, of Balls, in Ware, Hertfordshire. Both were created baronets of Fen Ditton in Cambridgeshire by Charles I.

== Career ==
Willis went up to Christ's College, Cambridge in 1631, and was admitted to Gray's Inn in the same year. As a younger son, he stood to inherit little, so became a career soldier, enlisting in the Dutch military and serving at the Siege of Breda in 1637, returning to serve under King Charles I in the Bishops' Wars from 1639 to 1640. Prior to the outbreak of civil war, Willis was a member of the King's Guard based at Whitehall under Sir Thomas Lunsford.

He joined the Royalist cause as an officer in the King's army, being knighted on 1 October 1642 by the King for gallantry in a cavalry skirmish at Shrewsbury, and was promoted to Colonel of a Regiment of Cavalry under William Villiers, 2nd Viscount Grandison, being captured twice during this period but escaping. Imprisoned in the Tower of London for nine months following capture at Ellesmere in 1644, Willis joined Prince Rupert's forces.

Willis eventually became Colonel General of the counties of Lincolnshire, Nottinghamshire, and Rutland, and in May 1645 was appointed Governor of Newark. By this time Prince Rupert had been defeated at the Battle of Naseby, and through the machinations of Lord Digby, a rival and advisor to the King, came under suspicion as plotting against the crown. Rupert's subsequent surrender at Bristol caused Charles to dismiss his nephew from his service. While Charles was at Newark, Rupert arrived to confront him over what he considered the injury done to his honour; Willis rode out with Lord Gerard to greet him. The court-martial Rupert demanded exonerated him, but Willis, for what the King considered to be the disloyalty of his attendance on Rupert, was replaced by Lord Belasyse as Governor of Newark. Willis challenged him to a duel, but was stopped by the King; Rupert, his brother Prince Maurice, Gerard and other cavaliers took Willis's side and in the ensuing argument were all dismissed from the King's service. Rupert later reconciled with the King, and Willis, for his previous service, was created a Baronet of Fen Ditton in June 1646, as his elder brother, a landowner and politician, had been five years previously.

Following the Royalist defeat, Willis spent some time in Italy, returning to England in 1652 to join the Royalist underground organisation, the Sealed Knot (his successor as Governor of Newark, Belasyse, was also one of the members).

However, it seems Willis became a double agent. Although twice imprisoned by the Commonwealth, he established contact with Cromwell's secret service, led by John Thurloe, in 1656 or 1657, possibly for money (in A Child's History of England, Ch.XXXIV, Charles Dickens wrote that Willis "reported to Oliver everything that passed among them, and had two hundred a year for it"). Alternatively, Willis may have wanted to secure his safety in case the Royalist cause failed. Notwithstanding critical assessments of his actions, however, no evidence has been uncovered that Willis passed on any significant piece of information, or betrayed any old friends.

In 1659 Willis was denounced to the future King Charles II by Thurloe's secretary, Samuel Morland, who accused him of plotting, with Thurloe and Cromwell, to lure Charles and his brothers to return to England under false pretences (to meet followers in Sussex) and then assassinate them. Morland is said to have learned of the plan while pretending to be asleep in Thurloe's office in Lincoln's Inn.

After the Restoration Willis was banned from court, but no other punishment was imposed, presumably in recognition of his previous service. Having taken a wife of considerable means, he enjoyed a comfortable retirement with his family at Fen Ditton, where his will, dated 16 to 20 May, was probated 10 December 1690.

== Personal life ==
Willis married in or before 1659, Alice, daughter and sole heir of Thomas Fox, M.D., of Warlies, in Waltham Holy Cross, Essex [bur. there 26 Nov. 1662], and of Shipton, Oxon, by Anne, daughter of Robert Honywood, of Pett, in Charing, Kent. Her will, dated 27 October 1684, probated 28 March 1688. Alice was the great-granddaughter of the martyrologist John Foxe, her grandfather being his son Samuel (1560-1630).

The baronetcy passed to Sir Thomas Fox Willys, of Warlies (30 June 1661 – 1701) who was said by his grandfather Thomas Fox to have been born "bereft of his wits" and died unmarried and without children at the age of 59. With his death the Baronetcy created for Willis became extinct.

== In literature ==
Richard Willis appears as a character in Act II of the play Cromwell by Victor Hugo, published in Paris in 1828.

In his afterword to An Instance of the Fingerpost, Iain Pears explains that much of the book's plot was inspired by the career of Willis, and his family's later, unsuccessful attempts to clear his name.

== Notes ==
Baronetage of England
New creation	Baronet (of Fen Ditton); 1646–1690	Succeeded by Thomas Fox Willis
