= Constitutional Affairs Committee =

The Commons Constitutional Affairs Committee (est. January 2003) of the United Kingdom was a select committee of the House of Commons which looked into the expenditure, policy and administration of the Department for Constitutional Affairs and associated public bodies. Following the reorganization of the Department of Constitutional Affairs and Home Affairs Committee and until the end of the 2006-2007 parliamentary session, the committee oversaw the Ministry of Justice. The committee has been replaced by the Justice Committee.

== Remit ==
- Constitutional Issues, including: Church and State, and Royal matters; relations with the Channel Islands and Isle of Man; electoral law; party funding
- The Courts and Tribunals (but excluding individual cases)
- Judicial Matters, including: judicial appointments, training and conduct; appointments to tribunals; appointment of QCs (but excluding individual appointments)
- Criminal Justice, including: policy and legislation affecting the criminal courts (as distinct from criminal law, which does not fall within this committee's remit); international and European matters affecting the criminal courts
- International Legal Matters
- Civil Justice and Legal Services Markets, including: legal aid and the Legal Services Commission; private legal services and the Legal Services Ombudsman; civil court procedure and civil law; alternative dispute resolution; law reform and the Law Commission
- Family Justice and the Vulnerable, including: marriage, divorce and relationship support; international child abduction; mental incapacity; the Public Guardianship Office; the Official Solicitor and Public Trustee; transsexual people

The committee's remit also covered other departments for which the Secretary of State for Constitutional Affairs (subsequently Minister for Justice) and Lord Chancellor is responsible to Parliament, namely, the HM Courts Service, HM Land Registry, the Public Record Office, the Northern Ireland Court Service, and the Legal Service Commission. The committee has also launched an Inquiry into the implementation of the Freedom of Information Act.

In March 2006, the committee said it would inquire into party funding and would interview the Labour party's chief fundraiser Lord Levy who had been implicated in the Cash for Peerages scandal.

== See also ==
- Parliamentary committees of the United Kingdom
