= Sir Thomas Willys, 1st Baronet =

Sir Thomas Willys, 1st Baronet (c. 1612 – 17 November 1701) of Fen Ditton in Cambridgeshire, was a Member of Parliament for Cambridgeshire and Cambridge. He was also Sheriff of Cambridgeshire and Huntingdonshire.

== Early life ==
Willys was born about 1612 (baptised 6 September that year), son and heir of barrister Richard Willys, of Fen Ditton and Horningsey, Cambridgeshire, and Jane, daughter and heiress of William Henmarsh, of Balls, in Ware, Hertfordshire. His younger brother, Sir Richard, was an officer in the Royalist Army during the Civil War but was shunned by the court after the Restoration for working as a double agent for Oliver Cromwell during the Interregnum.

Willys inherited his father's estates on 16 October 1628.

== Career ==
Willys was created a baronet, of Fen Ditton, by Charles I on 15 December 1641. He was M.P. for Cambridgeshire in 1659 and for Cambridge in 1660. From 1665 to 1666 he was Sheriff of Cambridgeshire and Huntingdonshire.

He was elected as a Bailiff to the board of the Bedford Level Corporation in 1694, a position he held until his death.

In 1660, Willys was proposed as one of the Knights of the Royal Oak, an intended order of knighthood to be bestowed as a reward to supporters of Charles II of England; it was decided instead to institute a day of celebration, as it was thought that the establishment of the new order might stir dispute. The list of prospective knights included the valuation of their property; it was estimated that Willys's Fen Ditton estates were worth £1000 a year.

== Personal life ==
Around 1633 Willys married Anne first daughter and coheir of Sir John Wyld, of Mystole and of St. Martin's, Canterbury, Kent, by Anne, daughter of Robert Honywood, of Charing, in that county. She, who was born at her maternal grandfather's house, at Markshall, county Essex, died on 20 October 1685, aged 75.

His son and heir, Sir John Willys, 2nd Baronet (c. 1635 – 1704), succeeded to the baronetcy on the death of his father in 1701.

== Death ==
Willys died on 17 November 1701. His will was dated 13 and prorated on 25 November 1701.

== Notes ==
Attribution

Baronetage of England
New creation	Baronet (of Fen Ditton); 1641–1701	Succeeded by John Willys
