= Claud Schuster, 1st Baron Schuster =

British Baron

The Right Honourable The Lord Schuster GCB CVO QC
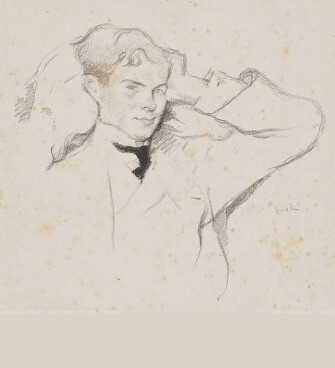

Permanent Secretary to the Lord Chancellor's Office
- In office 5 July 1915 – 1944
- Appointed by: Lord Haldane
- Preceded by: Sir Kenneth Muir Mackenzie
- Succeeded by: Sir Albert Napier

Personal details
- Born: 22 August 1869 Manchester, England
- Died: 28 June 1956 (aged 86) Charing Cross Hospital, London, England
- Spouse: Mabel Elizabeth Merry
- Relations: Sir George Schuster; Sir Felix Schuster; Arthur Schuster
- Children: Christopher Schuser; Elizabeth Schuster
- Education: New College, Oxford
- Profession: Barrister, Civil Servant

Claud Schuster, 1st Baron Schuster, GCB, CVO, QC (22 August 1869 – 28 June 1956), was a British barrister and civil servant noted for his long tenure as Permanent Secretary to the Lord Chancellor's Office. Born to a Mancunian business family, Schuster was educated at St. George's School, Ascot and Winchester College before matriculating at New College, Oxford in 1888 to read history. After graduation, he joined the Inner Temple with the aim of becoming a barrister, and was called to the Bar in 1895. Practising in Liverpool, Schuster was not noted as a particularly successful barrister, and he joined Her Majesty's Civil Service in 1899 as secretary to the Chief Commissioner of the Local Government Act Commission.

After serving as secretary to several more commissions, he was made Permanent Secretary to the Lord Chancellor's Office in 1915. Schuster served in this position for 29 years under ten different Lord Chancellors, and with the contacts obtained thanks to his long tenure and his work outside the Office he became "one of the most influential Permanent Secretaries of the 20th century". His influence over decisions within the Lord Chancellor's Office and greater Civil Service led to criticism and suspicions that he was a "power behind the throne", which culminated in a verbal attack by the Lord Chief Justice Lord Hewart in 1934 during a session of the House of Lords. Schuster retired in 1944 and was elevated to the peerage. Despite being officially retired, he continued to work in government circles, such as with the Allied Commission for Austria and by using his seat in the House of Lords as a way to directly criticise legislation.

== Early life and education ==
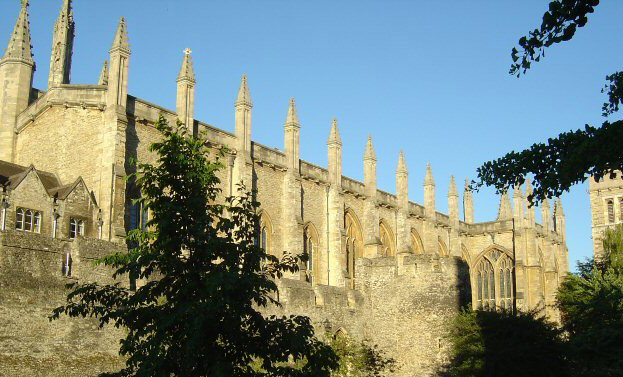
New College, Oxford, where Schuster studied between 1888 and 1892

Schuster was born on 22 August 1869 to Frederick Schuster, a manager of the Manchester firm of merchants Schuster, Fulder and Company, and his wife Sophia Wood, the daughter of a lieutenant colonel in the Indian Army. The family described themselves as "Unitarian" but were descended from Jews who had converted to Christianity in the mid-1850s and included other notable people such as Sir Arthur Schuster, Sir Felix Schuster, and later Sir George Schuster. From the age of seven he was educated at St. George's School, Ascot, one of the most expensive preparatory schools in the country, but one known for harsh treatment; it was standard for the headmaster to flog pupils until they bled and force other students and staff to listen to their screams. During the school holidays, he accompanied his father to Switzerland, where he developed a lifelong love of mountaineering and skiing. He was president of the Alpine Club from 1938 to 1940.

When he was fourteen he was sent to Winchester College, which was known as both the most academic of the main public schools and also for its discomfort. Schuster's time at St George's had prepared him for discomfort, however, and he was noted as being very proud of attending the school. While at Winchester, Schuster played Winchester College football and was occasionally involved in debates; he was not, however, noted as a particularly exceptional pupil. He matriculated at New College, Oxford in 1888 and graduated with second-class honours in history in 1892; again, he was not noted as a particularly outstanding student, which was attributed to the time he spent enjoying himself rather than studying. Despite his lack of academic brilliance he was invited to deliver the Romanes Lecture in 1949, an honour normally only given to the most eminent alumni of Oxford. After graduation, he unsuccessfully tried to become an examination fellow of All Souls College, Oxford.

== Bar work and career change ==
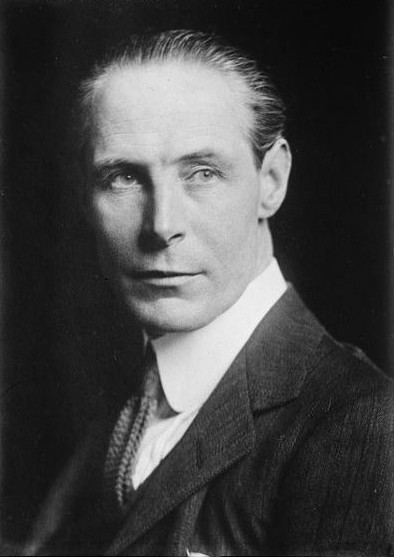
Warren Fisher, who worked with Schuster on the English Commission

After his failure to become a fellow of All Souls, Schuster joined the Inner Temple and was called to the bar in 1895. He practised in Liverpool and, though he was not noted as a particularly successful barrister, he became Circuit Junior of the Northern Circuit Bar in late 1895, an important position. By this point, Schuster was married and required a steady income to support his family, something which the bar was not providing. With his love of the English language and the knowledge that he was "good with paper" Schuster decided to join Civil Service, with the intention of becoming a Permanent Secretary.

Schuster entered the Civil Service in 1899 and as a qualified lawyer was exempt from the required examinations, something that marked him as "different" from other civil service employees with whom he worked. His first post was as secretary to the Chief Commissioner of the Local Government Act Commission, which produced a report leading to the creation of the London County Council. After this he worked as a secretary to the Great Northern Railway and then for the workers' union at London & Smith's Bank Ltd. After his job at the union, he was noticed by Robert Morant, who employed him as a temporary legal assistant to the Board of Education on the understanding that the job would become permanent, which it did in 1907. In 1911, he was promoted to Principal Assistant Secretary, and after Morant was appointed to the English Commission under the National Insurance Act 1911, Schuster followed him by being appointed Chief Registrar of the Friendly Societies, which granted him a place on the Societies' committee.

In February 1912 he gave up his position as Chief Registrar to become Secretary (and then legal adviser) to the English Insurance Commission, with the newspapers of the time reporting that he had had "three promotions in two months", a consequence of his high standing with Morant. During this period he was also involved in drafting education bills with Arthur Thring. The commission was "a galaxy of future Whitehall stars", and contained many individuals who would later become noted civil servants in their own right, including Morant, Schuster, John Anderson, Warren Fisher and John Bradbury. The contacts Schuster made during his time on the committee were instrumental in advancing his career; as a lawyer rather than a dedicated civil servant he was considered an outsider, and the links he made – particularly the friendships he struck up with Fisher and Anderson – helped allay this to some extent.

He was knighted in 1913 for his services on various committees.

== Permanent Secretary to the Lord Chancellor's Office ==
In 1915, Sir Kenneth Muir Mackenzie, the Permanent Secretary to the Lord Chancellor's Office, was close to retirement. The Lord Chancellor, Lord Haldane, believed that the duties of the lord chancellorship were too much for one man, and should be divided between a lord chancellor and a minister of justice. As such, he looked for a Permanent Secretary who was a qualified lawyer and who could help him set up a Ministry of Justice after the war, appointing Schuster in early 1915. The two did not work together, however, until Haldane became Lord Chancellor for a second time in 1924; he was forced to resign several months before Schuster started work on 2 July 1915 after being accused of pro-German sympathies.

=== Lords Buckmaster and Findlay (1915–1916, 1916–1919) ===
The first Lord Chancellor under whom Schuster served was Lord Buckmaster, who was appointed on 27 May 1915. Although most senior government offices at this time were held by wealthy aristocrats, the office of Lord Chancellor stood out as most of the appointees were lawyers from the middle class. Buckmaster was considered "the most plebeian of Lord Chancellors", as he was the son of a farmer and schoolteacher who later became a justice of the peace. Schuster became Permanent Secretary in July, a month after Buckmaster took his post, and immediately tried to make an impression on the workings of the office by modernising it; under the previous Permanent Secretary – who abhorred time-saving mechanisms – shorthand had been forbidden, and the office had owned only one typewriter. Buckmaster and Schuster had similar outlooks on World War I, with both their sons serving on the Western Front; Schuster almost certainly helped write the 1915 memorandum Buckmaster circulated to Cabinet arguing that forces should be concentrated on the Western Front rather than spread out in an attempt to assault other areas.

H. H. Asquith resigned as Prime Minister in December 1916, and as a member of Asquith's cabinet Buckmaster followed him. He was replaced by Lord Finlay who was appointed on 12 December. Aged 74 when he was appointed, Finlay was the oldest person to be made Lord Chancellor since Lord Campbell, who was 80 when he was appointed in 1859, and his age showed, with his decisions being slow and cautious. Luckily, the job of the Lord Chancellor during the last two years of World War I was limited to maintaining the system rather than instituting any changes, and his tenure was uneventful. During this period Schuster was very influential in judicial appointments, phrasing his reports in such a way that Finlay could only logically accept one candidate. Although Finlay was not a member of the War Cabinet, which limited his political influence to some extent, he was close friends with Lord Haldane and through Haldane Schuster made contacts with up and coming politicians such as Sir Alan Sykes and Jimmy Thomas; the group was described as "the future Labour Cabinet". During Findlay's tenure as Lord Chancellor the question of a Ministry of Justice again came up; while the Law Society was in favour of such a department the Bar Council along with Schuster was opposed to any changes in the status quo, and as the person who prepared a report on the matter for the Lord Chancellor Schuster did his best to express his disapproval of any changes. For his continued work in the Civil Service, Schuster was made a Commander of the Royal Victorian Order in 1918. A year later, he was made a King's Counsel: an odd honour for a man who no longer practised as a barrister.

=== Lord Birkenhead (1919–1922) ===
Finlay had been appointed on the conditions that he would not claim a pension (it was war-time, and there were already four retired Lord Chancellors claiming £5,000 per year pensions) and that he would resign when required. Despite this he was surprised when he was dismissed after the 1918 general election, first hearing about it when it was mentioned in the newspapers. His replacement Lord Birkenhead was appointed on 14 January 1919, and was a controversial choice; he was only 46 when appointed and was unpopular with large sections of the Bar as a result; George V himself wrote to the Prime Minister before Birkenhead was appointed and said that "His Majesty does not feel sure that [Birkenhead] has established such a reputation in men's minds as to ensure that the country will welcome him to the second highest position which can be occupied by a subject of the Crown". Birkenhead and Schuster established a strong partnership, and Schuster played a part in instituting Birkenhead's legal reforms, particularly those relating to the law of real property.

Real property law in the English and Welsh legal system had evolved from feudalism, and was an immensely complex system understood by only a small number of lawyers. In particular, peculiarities meant that land owned by beneficiaries could be sold without the agreement of all the beneficiaries involved, something partially rectified by the Settled Land Act 1882 and the Land Transfer Act 1897. Despite these statutes reform in this area was still needed, and Lord Haldane presented reform bills to parliament in 1913, 1914 and 1915 with no real progress thanks to the opposition of the Law Society. In March 1917 a Reconstruction Subcommittee under Sir Leslie Scott was created to consider land policy after the First World War, and Schuster (who had devilled for Scott when working as a barrister in Liverpool) was appointed as a member. The subcommittee decided that the law should be changed to merge real and personal property law, and that outdated aspects of land law, such as copyholds and gavelkind should be eliminated. When Birkenhead became Lord Chancellor in 1919, he inherited the problem of English property law, and immediately instructed Schuster to prepare the department for forcing a bill through Parliament on the matter.

Although there was general agreement that property law should be reformed, the process was made more difficult by the various vested interests involved; the Law Society, for example, was opposed to the changes because it would reduce the fees dedicated property solicitors could earn by making it possible for more solicitors to understand that area of law and become involved. After intense negotiation Schuster and the Law Society representative agreed that a "period of probation" lasting three years would be included in the bill, which Charles Brickdale the Chief Registrar of HM Land Registry considered "a very good bargain". When the bill finally got to the House of Commons it met additional opposition from Members of Parliament who were also members of the Law Society and Bar Council, as well as Lord Cave who later became Lord Chancellor. After further negotiations the bill was passed on 8 June 1922, with Birkenhead taking the credit, and it became the Law of Property Act 1922.

Schuster also assisted Birkenhead in his attempts to reform the administration of the court system, particularly in his preparation of the Supreme Court of Judicature (Consolidation) Act 1925. A committee was also set up to look into the reform of the Supreme Court of Judicature, the County Courts and the Probate Services, divided into a subcommittee for each institution. Schuster served as a member of the committee, with his primary goal being to end the patronage and nepotism that filled the judicial system. Although the Supreme Court was resistant the committee did succeed in making some changes, such as introducing mandatory retirement ages for masters and clerks; they were unable, however, to end the patronage. Schuster also attempted to reform the County Courts by increasing their jurisdiction, and a Committee on County Court Procedure (known as the Swift Committee after its chairman Rigby Swift) was set up in 1920, with Schuster serving as a member. The commission concluded that the Treasury had mismanaged the County Courts, and on 1 August 1922 the Lord Chancellor's Office instead became responsible for the courts, with Schuster becoming Accounting Officer. The committee's final report was used as the basis for the County Courts Act 1924, which did much to correct the problems with the County Courts. Schuster was appointed Knight Commander of the Order of the Bath (KCB) in the 1920 New Year War Honours.

=== Lords Cave and Haldane (1922–1924, 1924) ===
By the summer of 1922 the coalition government Birkenhead was a member of began to splinter, and when it finally collapsed, Birkenhead was forced to resign on 25 October 1922. His replacement was Lord Cave, a member of the new Conservative government who was appointed on 27 October 1922. The Conservative government under Stanley Baldwin soon ran into trouble due to his desire to introduce protectionist tariffs to protect British jobs. Baldwin called an early general election in December 1923 to serve as a referendum on the subject, and although the Conservatives remained the largest party, they did not have enough Members of Parliament to claim a parliamentary majority. At the opening of the new Parliament in January 1924, the party was defeated in a vote of no confidence, and the King instead invited the Labour Party leader Ramsay MacDonald to form a government. This caused various constitutional problems; traditionally, every member of a cabinet, including the Prime Minister, must be a Privy Councillor. MacDonald was not a Privy Councillor and therefore could not be made Prime Minister. The king asked Lord Cave for a way around this problem, and as an expert on constitutional issues, Schuster helped draft the response. In the end, it was determined that MacDonald would be sworn in as a Privy Councillor and then invited to form a government.

As a member of the old Conservative government, Cave left office on 23 January 1924. He was replaced by Lord Haldane, who was serving for a second time and was sworn in on 25 January. Haldane was in favour of the creation of a Ministry of Justice, and although Schuster was privately against it he suggested that he would have accepted the responsibilities of such a Ministry on the condition that it remained under his control as the Lord Chancellor's Office was. Haldane was ill, however, and the Labour government lasted only ten months thanks to the publishing of the Zinoviev Letter, and no large-scale reforms such as the creation of a Ministry of Justice were ever pushed through.

=== Lords Cave and Hailsham (1924–1928, 1928–1929) ===
After the collapse of the Labour government in October 1924, the Conservative Party returned to power, and Lord Cave became Lord Chancellor for a second time on 7 November. Spending four and a half years in office Cave had time to push through some significant reforms, including the Law of Property Act 1925 based on the 1922 act Schuster had been involved in. By 1925 Schuster had spent a decade as Permanent Secretary and was described as a "Whitehall Mandarin", his contacts and long service allowing him greater influence over policy decisions than a Permanent Secretary normally had. The expansion of the Lord Chancellor's Office he had overseen also gave him greater opportunities to delegate to his subordinates, allowing him more time to spend on committees and inquiries directly influencing the way the government worked. As a result of his power and influence, he grew to dislike being opposed in any way, and this led to conflict between him and other heads of department. As a reward for his continued service with the Lord Chancellor's Office, he was made a Knight Grand Cross of the Order of the Bath in the 1927 New Year Honours.

Lord Cave resigned on 28 March 1928 due to ill health and died the day after. His replacement was Lord Hailsham, who was appointed by Stanley Baldwin on 29 March 1928. Hailsham's first tenure as Lord Chancellor lasted barely a year and highlighted the fact that despite his abilities (many thought that if he had not accepted the offer to become Lord Chancellor he would likely have become Prime Minister) he was not a particularly innovative Lord Chancellor. For a short period in August 1928 he acted as Prime Minister (Baldwin was on holiday in Aix-en-Provence) with Schuster as his chief adviser, but he rarely went to 10 Downing Street and nothing eventful happened during his time in charge.

=== Lord Sankey (1929–1935) ===
Lord Hailsham left office in mid-1929 with the fall of the Conservative government in 1929. His replacement was a member of the newly elected Labour Government, Lord Sankey, who was appointed on 8 June 1929. Sankey was appointed on Schuster's advice, and served longer with him than any other Lord Chancellor. Sankey was a "reforming" Lord Chancellor, and as part of one of his first reforms Schuster helped him draft and pass the Statute of Westminster in 1931.

During this period the question of Judge's salaries also arose, and almost caused a constitutional crisis. As Permanent Secretary Schuster was tasked with ensuring that the courts ran correctly, and although the Judges were independent they were paid by the Lord Chancellor's Office. Although a Select Committee in 1878 had recommended that County Court Judges be paid £2,000 a year this increase had still failed to appear due to the economic hardships caused by the First World War. The increase was eventually implemented in 1937, but in the meantime High Court Judges had also been lobbying for an increase, as their pay had stayed at the same level since 1832. Schuster and Warren Fisher had produced a report recommending a pay increase in 1920, but again the economic hardship prevented their plan from being implemented. The 1931 economic crash led to the government passing the National Economy Act 1931, which enabled the government to reduce the salaries of High Court judges by 20%. The judges, who had been expecting a pay raise instead, were shocked, and six High Court judges threatened to resign, with Mr Justice McCardie accusing Schuster of having his salary almost doubled in the last twelve years. The Prime Minister and Sankey met to write a letter to the judges demanding that they give in; as soon as Schuster heard about this he rushed to Whitehall to "stop the madness". The protests from the judges increased through 1931 and 1932, with several judges including Mr Justice Clauson and Mr Justice Luxmoore threatening to sue the government. After negotiations between Schuster and the judges failed to bring an end to the crisis the section of the act cutting judges' pay was quietly dropped.

Soon after becoming Permanent Secretary, Schuster had decided that his aim should be to make sure that the entire court system was under the control of his office, rather than partially under his control and partially under the control of the Treasury as it had been when he started. The 1931 Royal Commission on the Civil Service recommended that all Civil Service departments take a more business-like approach to their work, and spurred Schuster into making a further attempt to reorganise and reform the Lord Chancellor's Office. As such he persuaded Sankey to set up a Departmental Committee on the Business of the Courts, with Lord Hanworth (one of Schuster's friends) chairing the committee and Schuster himself sitting as a member. As he had under Lord Birkenhead Schuster attempted to reform the county courts. He partially succeeded in doing so when his recommendations were included in the Administration of Justice (Appeals) Act 1934 which sent appeals from the county courts straight to the Court of Appeal rather than a divisional court. He also attempted to have the number of jury trials in civil cases reduced, something which Hanworth supported but which was blocked by the King's Bench Division.

Schuster also took part in law reform after Lord Sankey decided to set up a Law Revision Committee in January 1934, which consisted of Sankey, Schuster, four judges, five barristers, one solicitor and two academic lawyers. The committee produced 86 reports from 1934 to 1939 on a variety of subjects, and many of their recommendations were made into legislation after negotiations with the Home Office. Although the Law Revision Committee fell into disuse after this it was re-formed as a permanent Law Commission in 1965.

In 1934 Schuster was subject to a public attack by Lord Hewart, the Lord Chief Justice. On 7 December 1934 his clerk found a bill amongst Hewart's parliamentary papers with a clause that allowed the Lord Chancellor to appoint any Lord Justice of Appeal as vice-president of the Court of Appeal, a right traditionally held by the Lord Chief Justice. Hewart immediately made plans to attend the House of Lords, where Lord Sankey was expected to move the second reading of the bill in question. Immediately after second reading Hewart rose and began a speech that was "as violent an attack as has ever been made in the Lords". In it he criticised the officials of the Lord Chancellor's Department (which to listeners clearly meant Schuster specifically) and insinuated that the bill was part of a conspiracy to move power from the judiciary to the politicians (and thus the civil service) and create a Ministry of Justice. The speech provoked uproar in the house; a public quarrel between senior judges and civil servants had not happened in centuries, especially in such a traditionally calm and collected place. Lord Reading, himself a former Lord Chief Justice, adjourned the debate, and the following Friday Lord Hailsham, at the time the Leader of the House of Lords, made a defence of Schuster, saying that "I can show that this is an absolute delusion [and] that there was no such scheme ever hatched". He showed that the proposal of a Ministry of Justice had originated in 1836, long before Schuster became Permanent Secretary, and in addition that the report Schuster had helped prepare for Sankey was clearly biased against the creation of such a Ministry as he himself was opposed to it. He went on to praise Schuster as "the author and instigator of many great reforms", and along with a similar speech by Lord Sankey and an amendment to the offending bill, this helped appease Hewart.

=== Lords Hailsham and Maugham (1935–1938, 1938–1939) ===
Lord Hailsham returned to power on 7 June 1935 after the election of a new government, and by this point his health was beginning to decline, limiting his effectiveness. The Second Italo-Abyssinian War alerted the Civil Service and MI5 to the ambitions of Italy and Germany, and the Committee of Imperial Defence was asked to review the defence legislation that had been used in the First World War and present it to Warren Fisher. Fisher was horrified at how outdated the laws were, and with the permission of the Cabinet organised a War Legislation Committee under Schuster to draft a new code of defence regulations. Norman Brook, later head of the Civil Service, served as secretary, and the committee was described as "a model piece of organisation" thanks to the work of Schuster as chairman. The regulations drafted by the committee were eventually made into law after the passing of the Emergency Powers (Defence) Act 1939.

Lord Hailsham left his position in 1938 due to his failing health, and was replaced by Lord Maugham, who was appointed on 15 March. His appointment was done on Schuster's advice and was considered quite a surprise as he had no real political experience; even Maugham himself admitted he had not expected to be offered the job. Schuster and Maugham had a difficult relationship, especially after the start of the Second World War in 1939, due to their differing political opinions. Schuster did not play an active part in policy decisions in this period, partially because of his disagreements with Maugham and partially because Maugham preferred to work on legislation and policy changes himself. Schuster later said that he got on with all of his Lord Chancellors except one—Maugham.

=== Lords Caldecote and Simon (1939–1940, 1940–1945) ===
Lord Maugham resigned on 3 September 1939, giving his failing health as a reason (he was 73 when he left the post), and he was replaced by Lord Caldecote a day later. Caldecote only held the office for eight months, but during this period spent a large amount of time preparing legislation for the Second World War. Putting the country on a war footing would impact on the ability of people to fulfil their civil obligations if, for example, they were conscripted, and Schuster was made chairman of a Cabinet subcommittee "to consider the problems arising from the inability of persons, owing to war conditions, to fulfil their contractual and other obligations, and in particular to consider the complaints already made to MPs and government departments". The subcommittee made six reports and their recommendations were eventually made into the Liabilities (Wartime Adjustment) Acts of 1941 and 1944. Schuster also led the committee that drafted the USA (Visiting Forces) Bill that provided that any criminal proceedings in relation to the behaviour of US soldiers stationed in Britain would be led by the US military authorities rather than the British government.

Lord Caldecote was forced to leave his position after only 8 months due to the fall of Neville Chamberlain's government, of which he was a part. He was replaced by Lord Simon, who took up his position on 12 May 1940. Simon frequently delegated to Schuster and accepted his advice on judicial appointments, such as that of Tom Denning to the High Court in 1944. Schuster also had influence in committee appointments; when Simon was asked to select a chairman for the Committee on Reconstruction Priorities he delegated to Schuster, who chose Sir Walter Monckton.

== Retirement ==
Schuster retired in 1944, and on 22 June of that year he was raised to the peerage as Baron Schuster, of Cerne in the County of Dorset. By the time he retired Schuster had served as Permanent Secretary for 29 years under 10 Lord Chancellors, records that have not yet been broken. He also served as High Sheriff of Dorset in 1941. In retirement, he undertook work for the Allied Commission for Austria and "tackled the unexpected with the zest of a young man" despite being 75. He returned to Britain in 1946. He served as Treasurer of the Inner Temple in 1947, and in 1948 and 1949 took his seat in the House of Lords to voice his opinions on legislation, something he had previously been unable to do publicly due to Civil Service neutrality. He participated in debates over the Criminal Justice Act 1948 and Criminal Justice Act 1949, and was noted for being polite to the point of obsequiousness. He gave the Romanes Lecture in 1949 on the subject of "Mountaineering" and continued to play an active part in public life, helping reconstruct the Inner Temple after it was bombed in the Second World War. On 27 June 1956, he fell ill at an old Wykehamist dinner and was taken to Charing Cross Hospital, where he died the next morning.

== Personal life ==
Schuster met William Walter Merry when he was Rector of Lincoln College, Oxford and the two became friends due to their shared love of mountaineering. Through him, he met Merry's daughter, Elizabeth, whom he married in 1896. They had two children: a son, Christopher John Claud Schuster, in 1899 and a daughter, Elizabeth Alice Schuster, in 1902, before Elizabeth Merry's death in 1936. Christopher also attended Winchester College and was killed in 1918 on the Western Front, and Elizabeth later married Theodore Turner, a King's Counsel, before dying in 1983.

== Arms ==
Coat of arms of Claud Schuster, 1st Baron Schuster
Crest On a wreath Or and Gules a lion passant Or gorged with a collar flory counter flory Gules and resting the dexter paw on an escutcheon Argent charged with a penner and ink-horn Sable. Escutcheon Ermine a lion passant Or on a chief Gules a portcullis chained between two hearts also Or. Supporters Dexter a lion Ermine; sinister a pegasus Or; each gorged with a collar flory counter-flory Gules. Motto Levavi Oculos

== Bibliography ==
- Hall, Jean Graham; Douglas F. Martin (2003). Yes, Lord Chancellor: A Biography of Lord Schuster. Chichester, West Sussex: Barry Rose Law Publishers. ISBN 1-902681-35-5.

Government offices
Preceded by Sir Kenneth Muir Mackenzie	Permanent Secretary of the Lord Chancellor's Department; 1915–1944	Succeeded by Sir Albert Napier
Peerage of the United Kingdom
New creation	Baron Schuster; 1944–1956	Extinct
