= Lord Chancellor's Department =

Former UK Government department

Ministerial Department overview
- Formed: 1885
- Dissolved: 2003
- Superseding Ministerial Department: Department for Constitutional Affairs
- Jurisdiction: Government of the United Kingdom
- Minister responsible: Lord Chancellor

The Lord Chancellor's Department was a United Kingdom government department answerable to the Lord Chancellor with jurisdiction over England and Wales.

Created in 1885 as the Lord Chancellor's Office with a small staff to assist the Lord Chancellor in his day-to-day duties, the department grew in power over the course of the 20th century, and at its peak had jurisdiction over the entire judicial system and a staff of over 22,000. In 2003, it was succeeded by the Department for Constitutional Affairs (now the Ministry of Justice).

== History ==
The department was created in 1885 by Lord Selborne, who was the Lord Chancellor at the time. The Lord Chancellor was the only cabinet minister (other than those without portfolio) not to have a department of civil servants answerable to him, and justified the expenditure of creating a permanent department by saying that:

The Lord Chancellor, though Minister of Justice for almost every purpose unconnected with the Criminal Law, had no assistance of the kind given to the other chief Departments of State, either of permanent secretaries or under secretaries. The officers attached to him were personal and liable to change with every change of government.. but on each change of government the lack of continuity was more or less felt; and as the Lord Chancellor's Department work had a constant tendency to increase, the pressure of that lack increased with it.

The department was originally named the Lord Chancellor's Office, with the first employees simply being transferred from Selborne's personal retinue to the new office. The need for the office was partly due to the Supreme Court of Judicature Acts of 1873 and 1875, which significantly changed the structure of the courts and increased the Lord Chancellor's workload as he struggled to enact the changes that the Acts required. Due to the odd nature of the Lord Chancellor's Office compared to other government departments (it was staffed almost entirely by lawyers and had an initial staff of only five) it developed slightly differently from other departments, regarding itself more as a lobbying organisation for the judges and the courts than a traditional government department.

The office was initially little more than a personal entourage for the Lord Chancellor and did little administrative work, with it being described in 1912 as "not far removed from an interesting little museum". The appointment of Claud Schuster as Permanent Secretary in June 1915 changed this; he set about reforming the office to allow it to effectively run the court system. Initially with only a limited jurisdiction the Lord Chancellor's Department grew in power in the 1920s, with the transfer of control of the county courts from HM Treasury to the department in 1922 and the Supreme Court (consolidation) Act 1925.

The power of the department reached its peak after the Courts Act 1971 was passed, which modernised the English court system and put the Lord Chancellor's Department in direct control. Such a large increase in powers necessitated a change of office; previously the department had worked out of the Lord Chancellor's offices in the House of Lords, but it now moved to dedicated offices in Whitehall. The passing of the Senior Courts Act 1981 and a 1992 move that transferred responsibility for the magistrates' courts to the department also served to increase its responsibilities. The department ceased to exist as an independent body in 2003, when its functions were transferred to the newly created Department for Constitutional Affairs (which itself became the Ministry of Justice in 2007).

== Remit ==
At the time of its merger the Lord Chancellor's Department was charged with appointing and advising on the appointment of judges, running the court system and a certain number of tribunals and assisting in the reform of the English law. To this end it controlled the Public Trust Office, the Courts Service, the Official Solicitor's Office, the Office of the Judge Advocate General, the Legal Aid Board and several more government agencies.

== Structure ==
The office was run by the Permanent Secretary to the Lord Chancellor's Office, a senior member of the Civil Service who also served as Clerk of the Crown in Chancery. The office he ran was initially small, consisting of five individuals; the Permanent Secretary, his personal secretary, the personal secretary to the Lord Chancellor, the Secretary of Presentations (who advised the Lord Chancellor on the appointment of senior members of the Church of England) and the Secretary of Commissions (who advised the Lord Chancellor on the appointment of magistrates). The department stayed small compared to other ministerial departments; in the 1960s it had a staff of only 13 trained lawyers and a few secretaries. The passing of the Courts Act 1971 and the additional duties it gave to the Lord Chancellor's Department forced it to expand, and by the time it ceased to exist as an independent department it had a staff of 12,000 direct employees, 10,000 indirect employees, 1,000 buildings (more than any other government department) and a yearly budget of £2.4 billion.

== Peculiarities ==
The Lord Chancellor's Department was significantly different from other government departments in a number of ways. Until 1992 it had no representative in the House of Commons; as Speaker of the House of Lords the Lord Chancellor could not sit in the House of Commons. The department was also exempt from being scrutinised by the parliamentary select committees, something which changed in 1990. The Permanent Secretary also had to be a barrister of at least seven years' standing, and the Deputy Secretary always succeeded the Permanent Secretary when he retired. Both of these changed in 1990.

== Junior ministers ==
Name	Portrait	Entered office	Left office	Political party	Title
Geoff Hoon		6 May 1997	17 May 1999	Labour	Parliamentary Under-Secretary (6 May 1997 – 28 July 1998) Minister of State (28 July 1998 – 17 May 1999)
Keith Vaz		17 May 1999	28 July 1999	Labour	Parliamentary Under-Secretary to the Lord Chancellor's Department
David Lock		29 July 1999	11 June 2001	Labour	Parliamentary Under-Secretary to the Lord Chancellor's Department
Jane Kennedy		11 October 1999	11 June 2001	Labour	Parliamentary Under-Secretary to the Lord Chancellor's Department
Willy Bach, Baron Bach		20 November 2000	11 June 2001	Labour	Parliamentary Under-Secretary to the Lord Chancellor's Department
Michael Wills		11 June 2001	29 May 2002	Labour	Parliamentary Under-Secretary to the Lord Chancellor's Department
Patricia Scotland, Baroness Scotland of Asthal		11 June 2001	12 June 2003	Labour	Parliamentary Under-Secretary to the Lord Chancellor's Department
Rosie Winterton		11 June 2001	12 June 2003	Labour	Parliamentary Under-Secretary to the Lord Chancellor's Department
Yvette Cooper		29 May 2002	12 June 2003	Labour	Parliamentary Under-Secretary to the Lord Chancellor's Department

== Bibliography ==
- Hall, Jean Graham; Martin, Douglas F. (2003). Yes, Lord Chancellor: A Biography of Lord Schuster. Chichester, West Sussex: Barry Rose Law Publishers. ISBN 1-902681-35-5.
- Jackson, R. M. (1977). Machinery of Justice in England. Cambridge University Press. ISBN 978-0-521-21688-3.
- Woodhouse, Diana (2001). The Office of Lord Chancellor. Hart Publishing. ISBN 1-84113-021-4.
