= Department for Constitutional Affairs =

Former UK Government department

Agency overview
- Formed: 12 June 2003
- Preceding agency: Lord Chancellor's Department
- Dissolved: 9 May 2007
- Superseding agency: Ministry of Justice (United Kingdom)
- Jurisdiction: Government of the United Kingdom
- Minister responsible: Lord Chancellor
- Website: https://www.dca.gov.uk

The Department for Constitutional Affairs (DCA) was a United Kingdom government department. Its creation was announced on 12 June 2003; it took over the functions of the Lord Chancellor's Department. On 28 March 2007 it was announced that the Department for Constitutional Affairs would take control of probation, prisons and prevention of re-offending from the Home Office and be renamed the Ministry of Justice. This took place on 9 May 2007.

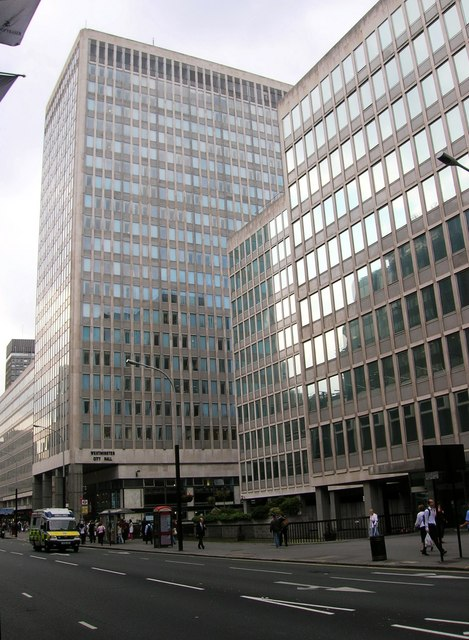
Department's headquarters (on the right)

It was primarily responsible for reforms to the constitution, relations with the Channel Islands and Isle of Man and, within England and Wales, it was concerned with the administration of the Courts, legal aid, and the appointment of the judiciary. Other responsibilities included issues relating to human rights, data protection, and freedom of information.

It incorporated the Wales Office and the Scotland Office, but those offices remained the overall responsibility of the Secretary of State for Wales and Secretary of State for Scotland, respectively.

After the 2005 general election, it gained additional responsibilities for coroners and conduct of local government elections in England.

== Departmental executive agencies and public bodies ==
- Her Majesty's Courts Service (for England and Wales)
- Public Guardianship Office (for England and Wales)
- Tribunals Service
- Official Solicitor and Public Trustee
- Legal Services Commission
- HM Land Registry

== Legislation enacted by the department ==
This is a list of acts of Parliament enacted since 1997 that gave powers to the Department of Constitutional Affairs.

=== Constitutional acts ===
- Compensation Act 2006
- Criminal Defence Service Act 2006
- Inquiries Act 2005
- Constitutional Reform Act 2005
- Mental Capacity Act 2005
- Gender Recognition Act 2004
- Courts Act 2003
- Commonhold and Leasehold Reform Act 2002
- Land Registration Act 2002
- Freedom of Information Act 2000
- Access to Justice Act 1999
- Data Protection Act 1998
- Human Rights Act 1998

=== Election acts ===
- Electoral Administration Act 2006
- European Parliamentary and Local Elections (Pilots) Act 2004
- European Parliament (Representation) Act 2003
- European Parliamentary Elections Act 2002
- Political Parties, Elections and Referendums Act 2000
- Representation of the People Act 2000

== Secretary of State for Constitutional Affairs ==
The secretary of state for constitutional affairs was a secretary of state in the Government of the United Kingdom, with overall responsibility for the business of the Department for Constitutional Affairs. The position existed from 2003 to 2007.

At its creation, certain functions of the lord chancellor which related to the Lord Chancellor's Department were transferred to the new secretary of state. At a later date further functions were also transferred to the secretary of state for constitutional affairs from the first secretary of state, a position within the government held by the deputy prime minister.

The only holder of the post was Lord Falconer of Thoroton who also simultaneously continued to serve as Lord Chancellor. Certain functions, linked by statute with the office of Lord Chancellor, were not transferred to the new office of secretary of state for constitutional affairs.

The corresponding shadow minister was the shadow secretary of state for constitutional affairs, and the secretary of state was also scrutinised by the Constitutional Affairs Committee.

The post was formally created through the approval, by way of the Order-in-Council procedure, of the Secretary of State for Constitutional Affairs Order 2003 (SI 2003 No. 1887). The office was discontinued on 9 May 2007, and all of its responsibilities were transferred to the new post of Secretary of State for Justice, the first holder of which was also Lord Falconer of Thoroton.

Secretary of State	Term of office		Political party	Ministry
Charles Falconer, Baron Falconer of Thoroton	12 June 2003	8 May 2007 (position abolished)	Labour	Blair II
Charles Falconer, Baron Falconer of Thoroton	12 June 2003	8 May 2007 (position abolished)	Labour	Blair III
Subsequently became Secretary of State for Justice

== Junior ministers ==
- Chris Leslie (June 2003 – May 2005)
- David Lammy (June 2003 – May 2005)
- Anne McGuire (June 2003 – May 2005)
- Don Touhig (June 2003 – May 2005)
- Geoffrey Filkin, Baron Filkin (June 2003 – September 2004)
- Catherine Ashton, Baroness Ashton of Upholland (September 2004 – May 2007)
- Harriet Harman (May 2005 – May 2007)
- Bridget Prentice (May 2005 – May 2007)
- Vera Baird (May 2006 – May 2007)

== See also ==
- English law
- Scottish Government
- Courts of Scotland
- Departments of the United Kingdom Government
- Minister for the Constitution and European Union Relations
- Cabinet Secretary for the Constitution, External Affairs and Culture
