= Style and title of the Canadian sovereign =

Formal mode of address of the monarch of Canada

The style and title of the Canadian sovereign is the formal mode of address of the monarch of Canada. The form is based on those that were inherited from the United Kingdom and France, used in the colonies to refer to the reigning monarch in Europe. As various Canadian territories changed ownership and then the country gradually gained independence, the style and title of the monarchs changed almost as often as the kings and queens themselves. The mode of address currently employed is a combination of a style that originates in the early 17th century and a title established by Canadian law in 2024.

== Current style and titles ==
In 2023, months after the accession of King Charles III, the Canadian Parliament passed the Royal Style and Titles Act, providing for the Parliament's consent to the issuance of a royal proclamation changing the monarch's style and title in relation to Canada. The relevant royal proclamation was issued on 8 January 2024, and since then the sovereign's style and titles in Canada are, in English:

Charles the Third, by the Grace of God King of Canada and His other Realms and Territories, Head of the Commonwealth.

And in French:

Charles Trois, par la grâce de Dieu, Roi du Canada et de ses autres royaumes et territoires, Chef du Commonwealth.

The style and titles were composed to distinctly mention Canada so as to highlight the monarch's shared status, being both monarch of Canada and, separately, of the 14 other Commonwealth realms; with emphasis showing the distinct title King of Canada as embedded in the longer formal title.

Charles III is typically referred to as King of Canada (French: Roi du Canada), while in Canada or when acting as Canada's head of state

The monarch is typically referred to by the title King of Canada and is expected to allude to himself as King of Canada when in or acting abroad on behalf of the country. For example, Queen Elizabeth II said in 1973, "it is as Queen of Canada that I am here; Queen of Canada and of all Canadians, not just of one or two ancestral strains." Since the title was adopted, the federal government has promoted its use as a signifier of Canada's sovereign and independent status; Prime Minister John Diefenbaker said of the title in 1957, "the Queen of Canada is a term which we like to use because it utterly represents her role on this occasion."

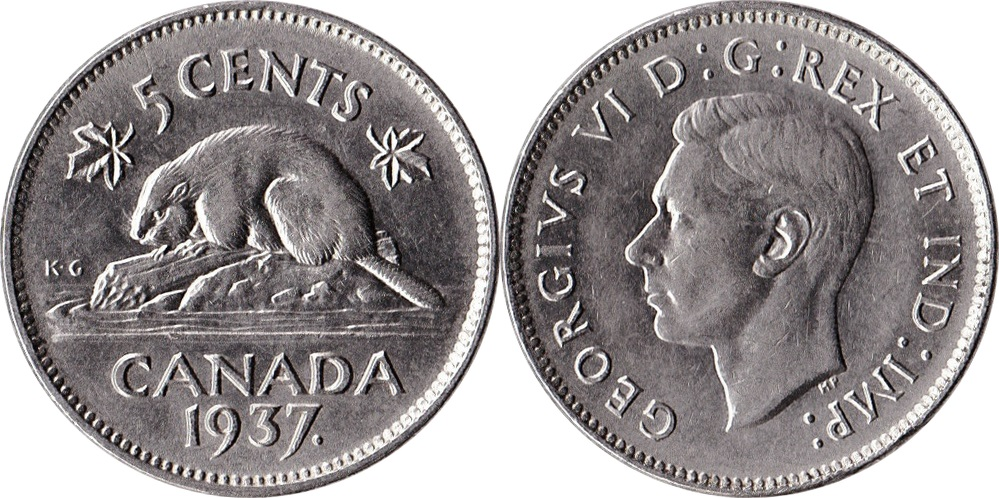
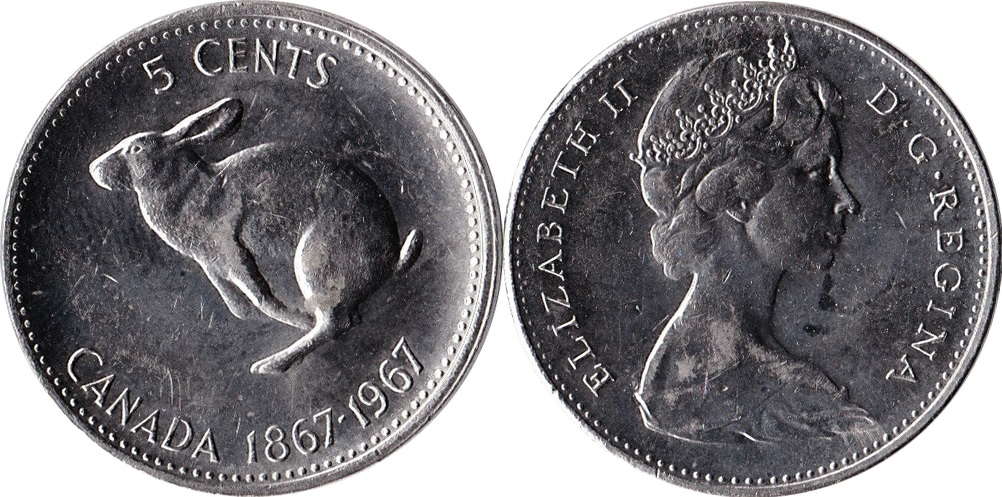
Canadian coins bearing the words D.G. Rex for King George VI (top) and D.G. Regina for Queen Elizabeth II (below)

The title is also included in the Oath of Allegiance, which forms a part of the Oath of Citizenship, and can be found as Charles III Dei Gratia Rex Canada (Latin for 'Charles III by the Grace of God King, Canada') on the obverse of Canadian medals, such as the King Charles III Coronation Medal.

Also, while the sovereign holds the nominal title head of the Commonwealth, this does not imply any political power over member states of the Commonwealth of Nations. In keeping, however, with the declaration of the prime ministers of the Commonwealth in London in 1949 of "the King as the symbol of the free association of its independent member nations and, as such, the Head of the Commonwealth," the title will pass to the next monarch upon the demise of the Crown and in fact did so in 1952 and 2022, though any future change is not a guaranteed certainty.

== Style of address ==
The use of the styles of address Highness and Majesty originated in the United Kingdom, where they were used from the 12th century onward. During the reign of James VI and I. However, Majesty became the official style, to the exclusion of all others, and it was then brought to North America during colonial times through usage in reference to the British monarch, who then had sovereignty over the colonies on that continent. Its usage has continued since Canada became a realm in its own right in 1867 and, after a process of constitutional evolution ending with full sovereignty from the United Kingdom, is now applied to the Canadian monarch. Unlike in the United Kingdom, where the sovereign is referred to in treaties and on British passports as His Britannic Majesty, the sovereign in Canada is referred to simply as His Majesty (Sa Majesté). Still, from time to time, the style will be His Canadian Majesty, so as to differentiate from foreign sovereigns. Canadian styles of address are officially maintained by the Department of Canadian Heritage's Protocol Office.

== History ==
Elizabeth II, the first Canadian monarch to be titled Queen of Canada (r. 1952–2022)

Following Canadian Confederation, Prime Minister of Canada John A. Macdonald, having been denied the name Kingdom of Canada for the new country, was repeatedly heard to refer to Queen Victoria as the queen of Canada and, similarly, in the lead up to the coronation of King Edward VII in 1902, Prime Minister Wilfrid Laurier desired to have the words king of Canada included in the royal title by the time of the ceremony. This wish was not fulfilled, however, and Canada inherited the full British title when the country gained legislative independence from the United Kingdom in 1931.

Liberal Member of Parliament Eugène Marquis in 1945 tabled a motion in the House of Commons proposing that a change to the King's title be a subject of discussion at the next Commonwealth Prime Ministers' Conference; Marquis suggested that the title include each of the King's Dominions, giving him the designation king of Canada. But, the motion did not pass and it was only in 1948 that that form of address changed, when the Canadian Parliament passed in 1947 its own Royal Style and Titles Act and an order-in-council was issued on 22 June the following year to remove the term emperor of India from the sovereign's Canadian title. In 1949, it was suggested by Cabinet that the King's title be altered so that, in Canada, it would be George the Sixth, by the Grace of God, of Canada and the other nations of the British Commonwealth, King; but, again, nothing came of the proposal. At the time, Robert Gordon Robertson, then a member of the Cabinet Secretariat, opined that Canadians would not like the title King of Canada, as "most Canadians [...] have not thought of themselves as citizens of either a republic or a monarchy." Still, in 1950, when William Ferdinand Alphonse Turgeon was sent to Ireland as Canada's ambassador, the Cabinet wished to have George VI referred to in the letters of credence as King of Canada. The King's secretaries objected strongly, claiming the monarch had only one title in law and Turgeon's letters eventually used George's full legal title, which referred to him as sovereign of Great Britain and "Ireland".

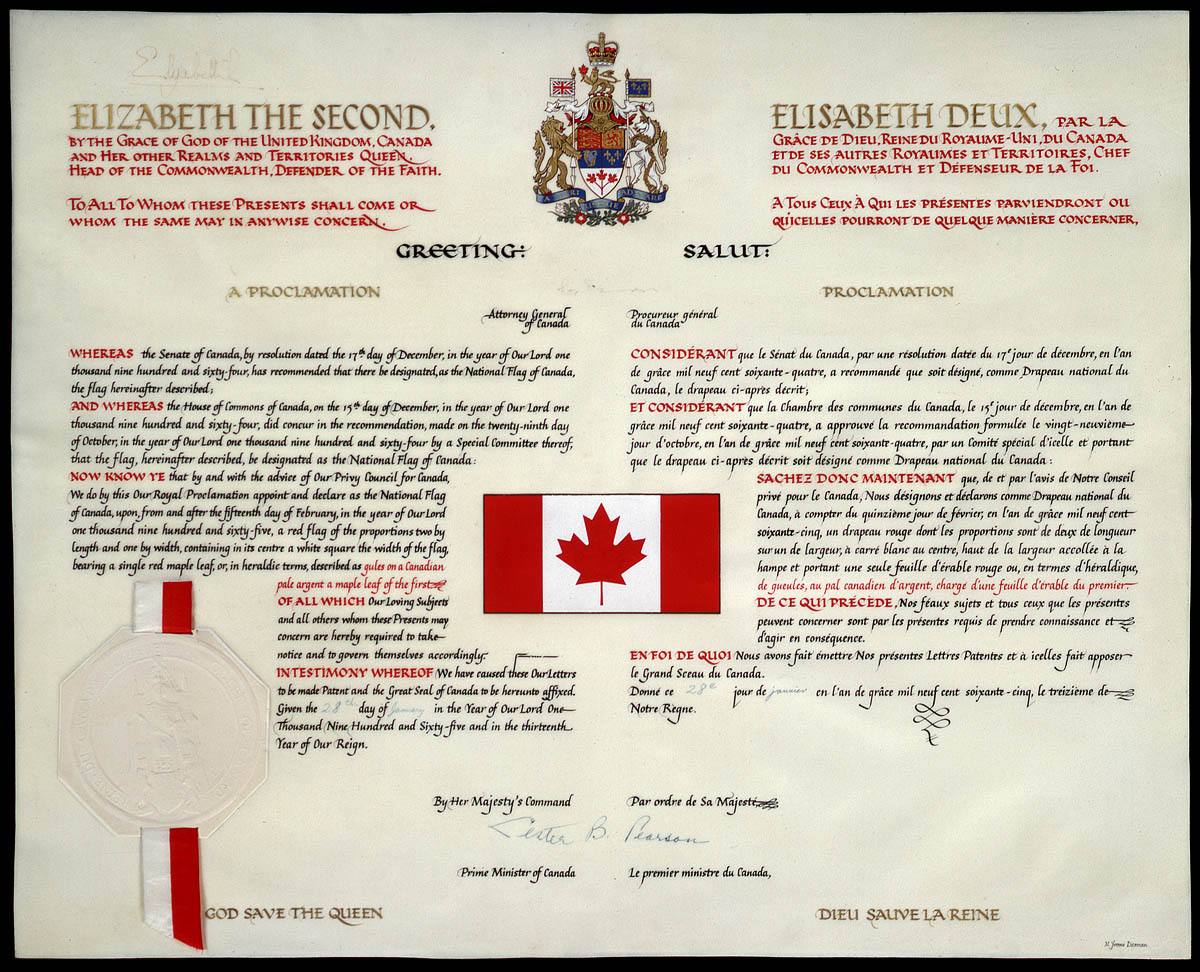
The royal proclamation of the National Flag, issued in 1965, with the full title of Queen Elizabeth II, in both French and English at top

The proclamations of Elizabeth II's accession to the throne in February 1952 differed between Canada and the United Kingdom; in the latter, the new queen was referred to unconventionally as Queen Elizabeth II by the Grace of God, Queen of this Realm, and of Her other Realms and Territories, while the Canadian Privy Council adhered to the letter of the law, calling the sovereign Elizabeth the Second by the Grace of God, of Great Britain, Ireland and the British Dominions beyond the Seas Queen. The discrepancies between independent countries sharing one person as sovereign prompted discussions among the Commonwealth prime ministers before a meeting in London, England, in December 1952; Canada's then-prime minister, Louis St. Laurent, stated that it was important a new composition for the royal title be agreed upon by all realms involved, to "emphasise the fact that the Queen is Queen of Canada, regardless of her sovereignty over other Commonwealth countries." Canada's preferred format was Elizabeth the Second, by the Grace of God, Queen of Canada and of Her other realms and territories, Head of the Commonwealth, Defender of the Faith; the Canadian government preferred to keep the word queen next to Canada, as it made the sovereign's role as monarch of Canada more clear than having queen follow several words on after the country's name. However, as Australian ministers wished to have the United Kingdom mentioned in all the Queen's titles, the resolution reached was a designation that included the United Kingdom as well as, for the first time, reference to Canada and the other Commonwealth realms separately. Although the Queen's Canadian titles included defender of the faith/défenseur de la foi, neither the monarch nor any of the viceroys had an official religious role in Canada. Unlike in the United Kingdom, where the term (fidei defensor, in Latin) signifies the sovereign's position as supreme governor of the Church of England and a member and defender of the security of the Church of Scotland, there have been no established churches in Canada since before its confederation in 1867. "Defender of the faith", thus, had a more vague meaning in the Canadian title, alluding only to the monarch's belief in a higher power. Prime Minister St. Laurent stated on this matter in his 1953 contribution to the debate on the Royal Style and Titles Act in the House of Commons:

"the rather more delicate question arose about the retention of the words defender of the faith [...] In our countries [Canada and the other non-British monarchies of the Commonwealth], there are no established churches. But, in our countries there are people who have faith in the direction of human affairs by an all-wise providence; and we felt that it was a good thing that the civil authorities would proclaim that their organization is such that it is a defence of the continued beliefs in a supreme power that orders the affairs of mere men and that there could be no reasonable objection from anyone who believed in the supreme being in having the sovereign, the head of the civil authority, described as a believer in and a defender of the faith in a supreme ruler."

When the Royal Style and Titles Act of 1953 was debated in the House of Commons, St. Laurent asserted on the nature of the separate and shared characteristics of the Crown, "Her Majesty is now Queen of Canada but she is the Queen of Canada because she is Queen of the United Kingdom [...] It is not a separate office." The Canadian Parliament passed the act, providing for the Parliament's consent to the issuance of a royal proclamation changing the monarch's title being then used. The relevant royal proclamation was issued on 28 May 1953, just days before her coronation. The new legislation conferred publicly and legally the reality of a unique constitutional monarchy for Canada, thereby fulfilling the vision of the Fathers of Confederation.

The title of the Canadian sovereign was discussed intermittently through the end of the 20th and early 21st centuries, always ending up "on hold". By spring of 2023, between the accession of King Charles III and his coronation, the federal Cabinet introduced a bill changing the monarch's title by dropping the reference to the United Kingdom and the phrase Defender of the Faith. Philippe Chartrand, writing in the Western Standard, said this would help "clarify the distinct role of Charles III as King of Canada—constitutionally and legally independent from his role as King of the United Kingdom" and "part of the evolution of the Canadian Crown as a distinctly Canadian institution". The bill received royal assent on 22 June 2023, A royal proclamation of the new title was signed on 8 January 2024.

As of February 2025, Prince Edward Island continues to issue proclamations referring to the United Kingdom and to Defender of the Faith. Ontario continued this practice until late August 2024.

=== The royal style and titles of Canadian sovereigns ===
From	Title	Amending law	Monarchs
1 July 1867	By the Grace of God of the United Kingdom of Great Britain and Ireland Queen, Defender of the Faith		Victoria
28 April 1876	By the Grace of God of the United Kingdom of Great Britain and Ireland Queen, Defender of the Faith, Empress of India	Royal Titles Act 1876 (UK)	Victoria
22 January 1901	By the Grace of God of the United Kingdom of Great Britain and Ireland King, Defender of the Faith, Emperor of India	Common law	Edward VII
4 November 1901	By the Grace of God of the United Kingdom of Great Britain and Ireland and of the British Dominions beyond the Seas King, Defender of the Faith, Emperor of India	Royal Titles Act 1901 (UK)	Edward VII; George V
13 May 1927	By the Grace of God of Great Britain, Ireland and the British Dominions beyond the Seas King, Defender of the Faith, Emperor of India	Royal and Parliamentary Titles Act 1927 (UK)	George V Edward VIII; George VI
22 June 1948	By the Grace of God of Great Britain, Ireland and the British Dominions beyond the Seas King, Defender of the Faith	The Royal Style and Titles Act (Canada), 1947 (Can)	George VI
6 February 1952	By the Grace of God of Great Britain, Ireland and the British Dominions beyond the Seas Queen, Defender of the Faith	Common law	Elizabeth II
28 May 1953	By the Grace of God of the United Kingdom, Canada and Her other Realms and Territories Queen, Head of the Commonwealth, Defender of the Faith	Royal Style and Titles Act (Can)	Elizabeth II
8 September 2022	By the Grace of God of the United Kingdom, Canada and His other Realms and Territories King, Head of the Commonwealth, Defender of the Faith	Common law	Charles III
8 January 2024	By the Grace of God King of Canada and His other Realms and Territories, Head of the Commonwealth	Royal Style and Titles Act, 2023 (Can)	Charles III

== Titles bestowed by Indigenous peoples ==
During treaty negotiations between First Nations and agents of the British Crown in the late 1700s and early 1800s, the term Great Father came to be used to refer to King George III. This was revived as the Numbered Treaties were being formed during the latter quarter of the 19th century, when Queen Victoria was spoken of in familial terms such as the Great Queen Mother and the Great White Mother, as the Indigenous peoples understood the agreements to exist within a framework of kinship. (The informal titles, used in conjunction with the phrase Indian children for the aboriginals, were originally neither intended nor taken as an indication of Indigenous inferiority; though, they were later misinterpreted by Canadian government officials as such.) Victoria's great-grandson, Edward, Prince of Wales (later King Edward VIII) was given the title Morning Star by Chief Little Thunder when he was invested as a chief of the Nakoda and Kainai nations in Banff, Alberta, in 1919.

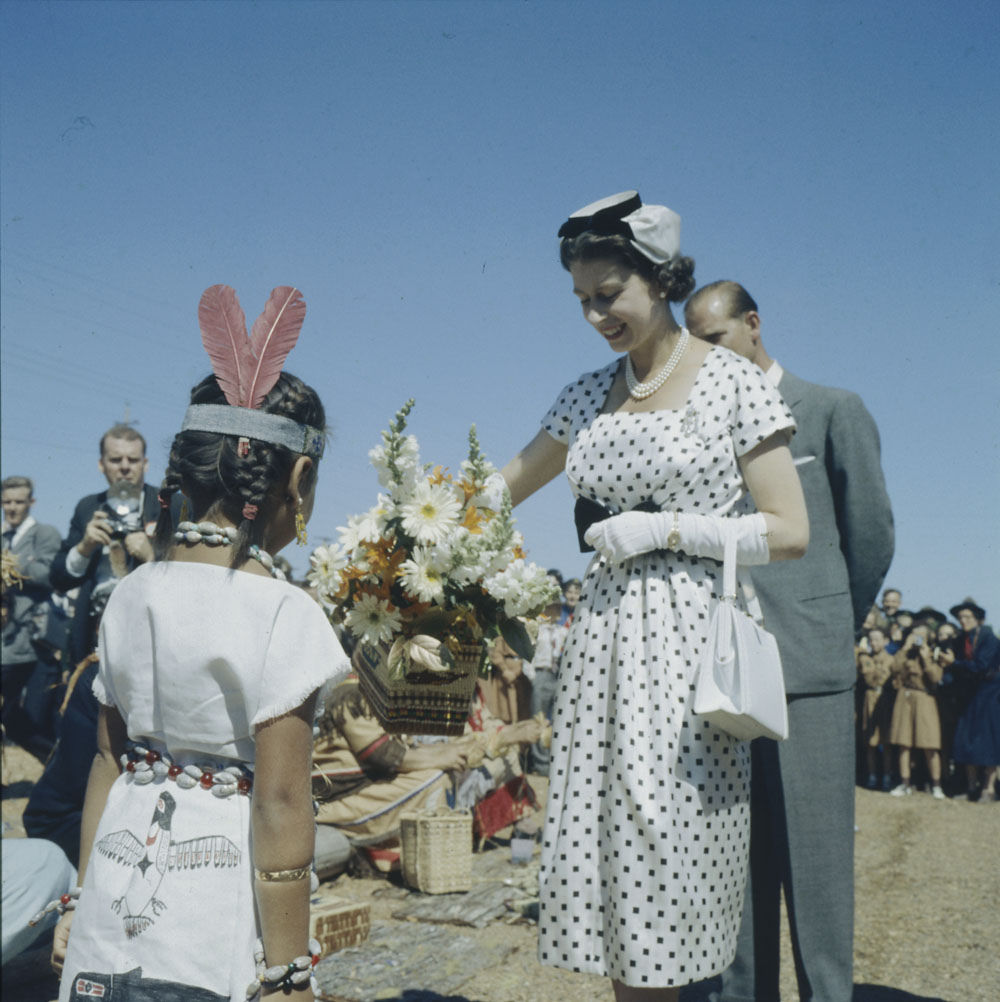
Queen Elizabeth II visiting with the Coast Salish peoples at Nanaimo, British Columbia, July 1959

During a lengthy meeting with Coast Salish peoples near Nanaimo, British Columbia, while on her royal tour of Canada in 1959, Queen Elizabeth II was granted by the Salish leaders the title Mother of All People. Elizabeth's son, Charles III, as heir to the throne, was given a number of titles by various tribes: In 1976, the Inuit in the Northwest Territories (today Nunavut) bestowed on him the title Attaniout Ikeneego (Inuktitut for 'the Son of the Big Boss'), which loosely translates to 'heir apparent', and, the following year, the Blackfoot in Alberta bestowed upon him the title Mekaisto, meaning 'Chief Red Crow'. Cree and Ojibway students in Manitoba named Charles Leading Star in 1986.

The Cree in Saskatchewan honoured the prince with the title Kīsikāwipīsimwa miyo ōhcikanawāpamik, which translates as 'The Sun Watches Over Him in a Good Way'. Chief Perry Bellegarde described this as echoing "the language of the Numbered Treaties" and to invoke "one of our most important teachings. [...] Grandfather Sun watches over all of us [...] We are all related, and we all depend on each other." The title was given to Charles in 2001 by Elder, Chief, and Sun Dance leader Gordon Oakes during ceremonies in Wanuskewin Heritage Park, marking the 125th anniversary of the signing of Treaty 6.

== See also ==
- Style of the British sovereign
- Style of the French sovereign
