= Registrar of the Peerage =

- Incumbent; Ceri King since 2016
- Ministry of Justice
- Appointer: The Lord Chancellor
- Inaugural holder: Andrew McDonald
- Formation: 2004
- Deputy: Elaine Chilver (Assistant Registrar of the Peerage)

The Registrar of the Peerage is responsible for maintaining and updating the Roll of the Peerage.

== History ==
The Roll of the Peerage was created by warrant under the royal sign manual in 2004 to work similarly to the Official Roll of the Baronetage. The warrant provided for the Lord Chancellor to appoint a Registrar, which has always been the Deputy Clerk of the Crown in Chancery, and has been held in conjunction to that of Registrar of the Baronetage.

There is also an Assistant Registrar who deputises for the Registrar, and examine succession claims while also maintaining and upkeeping the Roll. This role is held in conjunction with that of Deputy Head of the Crown Office.

== List of Registrars ==
Registrar of the Peerage
#	Portrait	Name (Birth–Death)	Term of office		Deputy	Concurrent office(s)	Ref.
1		Andrew McDonald (n/a)	2004	2005	Ian Denyer	Registrar of the Baronetage	
1		Andrew McDonald (n/a)	2004	2005	Grant Ashley Bavister	Registrar of the Baronetage	
2		Ian Denyer; MVO (n/a)	December; 2006	2016	Grant Ashley Bavister	Head of the Crown Office; Deputy Clerk of the Crown in Chancery; Registrar of the Baronetage; Clerk of the Chamber	
3		Ceri King; LVO (n/a)	2016	Incumbent	Elaine Chilver	Head of the Crown Office; Deputy Clerk of the Crown in Chancery; Registrar of the Baronetage; Clerk of the Chamber; Deputy Clerk of the Privy Council; Head of Secretariat	
