= Great Seal of the Realm =

Symbol of the British monarch's approval

Obverse side of the Great Seal of the Realm struck in 2025 during the reign of Charles III

The Great Seal of the Realm is a seal that is used in the United Kingdom to symbolise the sovereign's approval of state documents, today given on the advice of the government of the day. It is also known as the Great Seal of the United Kingdom (known prior to the Treaty of Union of 1707 as the Great Seal of England, and from then until the Union of 1801 as the Great Seal of Great Britain). To make it, granules of a thermoplastic (once wax) are softened in a silver mould or matrix and impressed into a plastic figure that is attached by cord or ribbon to documents that the monarch wishes to seal officially. The formal keeper of the seal is the Lord High Chancellor of Great Britain.

Scotland has had its own great seal since the 14th century. The Acts of Union 1707, joining the kingdoms of Scotland and England, provided for the use of a single Great Seal for the new Kingdom of Great Britain. However, it also provided for the continued use of a separate Scottish seal to be used there, and this seal continues to be called the Great Seal of Scotland and used by the monarch to sign letters patent for bills of the Scottish Parliament. Similarly, a separate Great Seal of Ireland, which had been used in Ireland since the 13th century, continued in use after the union of 1801, until the secession of the Irish Free State, after which a new Great Seal of Northern Ireland was created for use in Northern Ireland. A Welsh Seal was introduced in 2011.

== History ==
At some time before the year 1066 Edward the Confessor began to use a "Great Seal", which created a casting in wax of his own face, to signify that a document carried the force of his will. With some exceptions, each subsequent monarch up to 1603, when the king of Scotland succeeded to the throne of England, chose his or her own design for the Great Seal.

Levina Teerlinc is believed to have designed the seal of Queen Mary I, and also the earliest seal used by her successor Elizabeth I, in the 1540s.

When opening Parliament on 3 September 1654, the Lord Protector Oliver Cromwell was escorted by the three "Commissioners of the Great Seal of the Commonwealth of England", who were Whitelock, Lisle, and Widdrington. This Seal was inscribed with "The Great Seal of England, 1648", displaying a map of England, Ireland, Jersey, and Guernsey on one side, with the Arms of England and Ireland. On the other side was shown the interior of the House of Commons, the Speaker in his chair, with the inscription, "In the first year of Freedom, by God's blessing restored, 1648." In 1655, Cromwell appointed three Commissioners of the Great Seal of Ireland, Richard Pepys, Chief Justice of the Upper Bench, Sir Gerard Lowther, Chief Justice of the Common Bench; and Miles Corbet, Chief Baron of the Exchequer. But they held the seal only until 1656, when Cromwell nominated William Steele, Chief Baron of the Court of Exchequer in England, Lord Chancellor of Ireland.

In 1688, while attempting to flee to France during the Glorious Revolution, James II allegedly attempted to destroy his Great Seal by throwing it into the River Thames, in the hope that the machinery of government would cease to function. James's successors, William III and Mary II, used the same seal matrix in their new Great Seal. This may have been a deliberate choice, in order to imply the continuity of government. A new obverse was created, but the reverse was crudely adapted by inserting a female figure beside the male figure. When Mary died, the obverse returned to the design used by James II, while the female figure was deleted from the reverse. Thus, William III used a seal that was identical to James II's, except for changes to the legend and coat of arms.

The 1922 secession from the United Kingdom of the Irish Free State impelled a change in the royal style, which was agreed at the 1926 Imperial Conference and effected by the Royal and Parliamentary Titles Act 1927, after which a new Great Seal was made with the new style. The 1927 act referred to the "Great Seal of the Realm" as opposed to the previously usual "Great Seal of the United Kingdom" on the basis that the latter designation was too narrow, ignoring the use of the seal in relation to other Dominions of the British Commonwealth. Edward VIII, who abdicated only a few months after succeeding to the throne, never selected a design for his own seal and continued to use that of his predecessor, George V. Only one matrix of the Great Seal exists at a time, and since the material used for the Great Seal has a high melting point, the silver plates that cast the seal eventually wear out. The longer-lived British monarchs have had several Great Seals during their reigns, and Queen Victoria had to select four different Great Seal designs during her sixty-three years on the throne.

The last seal matrix of Elizabeth II was authorised by the Privy Council in July 2001. It was designed by James Butler and replaced that of 1953, designed by Gilbert Ledward. The obverse shows the middle-aged Elizabeth enthroned and robed, holding in her right hand a sceptre and in her left the orb. The circumscription is an abbreviated form of the royal titles in Latin: elizabeth · ii · d·g· britt· regnorvmqve · svorvm · ceter· regina · consortionis · popvlorvm · princeps · f·d·, lit. 'Elizabeth the Second, by the Grace of God, of the Britains and of her other realms Queen, Head of the Commonwealth, Defender of the Faith'. On the reverse are the full royal arms, including crest, mantling and supporters. This is the first time that the royal arms have provided the main design for one side of the English or British Great Seal. The obverse of the 1953 version depicted the Queen on horseback, dressed in uniform and riding sidesaddle, as she used to attend the annual Trooping the Colour ceremony for many years until the late 1980s. The seal's diameter is 6 inches (150 mm), and the combined weight of both sides of the seal matrix exceeds 275 troy ounces (302 oz; 8,600 g). In May 2025, Charles III's Great Seal of the Realm was unveiled. It was approved for use by Order in Council on 6 May.

== Design ==
The Great Seal is two-sided, with separate matrices for the obverse and reverse, the respective imprints of which are termed the seal and counterseal. The (obverse) seal contains an image of the monarch enthroned, encircled with the style of the monarch, usually in Latin. The counterseal usually contains an image of the monarch on horseback, encircled with either the same style of the monarch or a variant. Counterseals having non-equestrian images were that of Edward the Confessor (a variant of the seal image); the second of Anne (Britannia); the first of George V (the king as an Admiral of the Fleet); and the second of Elizabeth II and that of Charles III (the royal arms).

The Wafer Seal is single-sided embossing seal, the design of which is a shallow-relief copy of the obverse side of the Great Seal.

== Usage ==
The Great Seal is attached to the official documents of state that require the authorisation of the monarch to implement the advice of His Majesty's Government.

Under today's usage of the Great Seal, seals of dark green wax are affixed to letters patent elevating individuals to the peerage, blue seals authorise actions relating to the royal family, and scarlet seals appoint bishops and implement various other affairs of state. In some cases the seal is replaced by a wafer version, a smaller representation of the obverse of the Great Seal embossed on coloured paper attached to the document being sealed. This simpler version is used for royal proclamations, letters patent granting royal assent to legislation, writs of summons to Parliament, licences for the election of bishops, commissions of the peace, and many other documents. It formerly constituted treason to forge the Great Seal.

The Great Seal of the Realm is in the custody of and is administered by the Lord Keeper of the Great Seal. This office has been held jointly with that of Lord Chancellor since 1761. The current Lord Chancellor is Alex Norris. The Constitutional Reform Act 2005 reiterates that the Lord Chancellor continues to be the custodian of the Great Seal. Though, in the past, the Great Seal has been delivered to and remained in the custody of the Sovereign when it has been used to seal instruments that related to or granted gifts or emoluments to the Lord Chancellor.

The Clerk of the Crown in Chancery, who is also Permanent Secretary of the Ministry of Justice, heads His Majesty's Crown Office, and is responsible for the affixing of the Great Seal. They are assisted by the Deputy Clerk of the Crown. Day-to-day custody is entrusted to the Clerk of the Chamber, and subordinate staff include a Sealer and two Scribes to His Majesty's Crown Office.

Great Seal Act 1884 (Note: Section 1.)
- Act of Parliament
- Parliament of the United Kingdom
- Long title: An Act to simplify the passing of Instruments under the Great Seal of the United Kingdom.
- Citation: 47 & 48 Vict. c. 30
- Territorial extent: United Kingdom

Dates
- Royal assent: 28 July 1884
- Commencement: 28 July 1884 (Note: The Acts of Parliament (Commencement) Act 1793.)

Other legislation
- Amends: Great Seal Act 1880
- Repeals/revokes: Clerks of the Signet and Privy Seal Act 1535; Great Seal Act 1851
- Amended by: Statute Law Revision Act 1898
- Relates to: Crown Office Act 1877

Status: Amended

Text of statute as originally enacted

Revised text of statute as amended

Text of the Great Seal Act 1884 as in force today (including any amendments) within the United Kingdom, from legislation.gov.uk.

Section 2 of the Great Seal Act 1884 (47 & 48 Vict. c. 30) governs the use of the Great Seal of the Realm:

2 Authority for passing instrument under Great Seal.

(1) A warrant under Her Majesty's Royal Sign Manual, countersigned by the Lord Chancellor, or by one of Her Majesty's Principal Secretaries of State, or by the Lord High Treasurer, or two of the Commissioners of Her Majesty's Treasury, shall be a necessary and sufficient authority for passing any instrument under the Great Seal of the United Kingdom, according to the tenor of such warrant; Provided that any instrument which may now be passed under the Great Seal by the fiat or under the authority or directions of the Lord Chancellor or otherwise without passing through any other office may continue to be passed as heretofore.

(2) The Lord Chancellor may from time to time make, and when made revoke and vary, regulations respecting the passing of instruments under the Great Seal of the United Kingdom, and respecting the warrants for that purpose, and the preparation of such instruments and warrants, and every such warrant shall be prepared by the Clerk of the Crown in Chancery.

(3) No person shall make or prepare any warrant for passing any instrument under the Great Seal of the United Kingdom, or procure any instrument to be passed under that Seal otherwise than in manner provided by this Act or the Crown Office Act 1877; and any person who acts in contravention of this section shall be guilty of a misdemeanour.

== Inscriptions on the Great Seal ==
The Great Seal for each successive monarch is inscribed with the monarch's style (in Latin) on both sides of the seal. Some of those used in the past are shown below. Where the inscriptions on both sides of the seal are identical, only one is given. Where they are the same except for the use of abbreviations, the one with the fuller forms is given. Where they are different, they are shown separated by a slash.

=== Kingdom of England ===
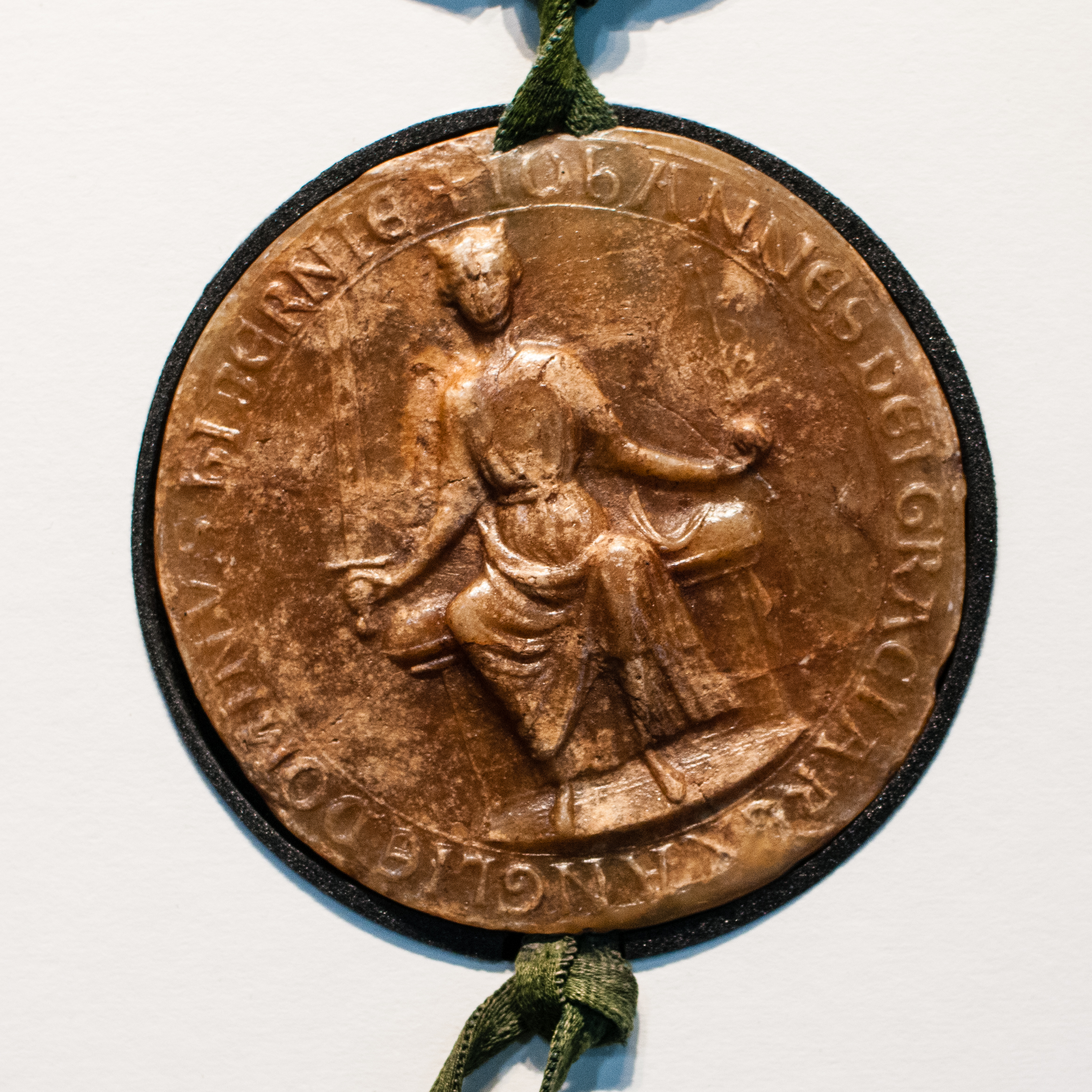
The Great Seal of King John

- Edward the Confessor. SIGILLVM EADVVARDI ANGLORVM BASILEI
  - Seal of Edward, Sovereign of the English.
- William I. HOC NORMANNORVM WILLELMVM NOSCE PATRONVM SI / HOC ANGLIS REGEM SIGNO FATEARIS EVNDEM
  - Know you this, William Patron of the Normans / By this sign recognise him King of the English
- William II. WILLELMVS DEI GRATIA REX ANGLORVM
  - William, by the grace of God, King of the English.
- Henry I. HENRICVS DEI GRATIA REX ANGLORVM / HENRICVS DEI GRATIA DVX NORMANNORVM
  - Henry, by the grace of God, King of the English / Henry, by the grace of God, Duke of the Normans.
- Stephen. STEPHANVS DEI GRATIA REX ANGLORVM
  - Stephen, by the grace of God, King of the English.
- Henry II. HENRICVS DEI GRATIA REX ANGLORVM / HENR[ICVS] DEI GRA[TIA] DVX NORMANNORVM ET AQUIT[ANORVM] ET COM[ES] ANDEG[AVORVM]
  - Henry, by the grace of God, King of the English / Henry, by the grace of God, Duke of the Normans and of the Aquitanians and Count of the Angevins.
- Richard I. RICARDVS DEI GRATIA REX ANGLORVM / RICARDVS DEI GRATIA DVX NORMANNORVM ET AQUITANORVM ET COMES ANDEGAVORVM
  - Richard, by the grace of God, King of the English / Richard, by the grace of God, Duke of the Normans and of the Aquitanians and Count of the Angevins.
- John. IOHANNES DEI GRACIA REX ANGLIE ET DOMINVS HIBERNIE / IOH[ANNE]S DVX NORMANNIE ET AQUITANIE COMES ANDEGAVIE
  - John, by the grace of God, King of England and Lord of Ireland / John, Duke of Normandy and of Aquitaine, Count of Anjou.
- Henry III. HENRICVS DEI GRACIA REX ANGLIE DOMINVS HIBERNIE DVX AQUITANIE
  - Henry, by the grace of God, King of England, Lord of Ireland, Duke of Aquitaine.
- Edward I. EDWARDVS DEI GRACIA REX ANGLIE DOMINVS HYBERNIE DVX AQUITANIE
  - Edward, by the grace of God, King of England, Lord of Ireland, Duke of Aquitaine.
- Edward II. EDWARDVS DEI GRACIA REX ANGLIE DOMINVS HYBERNIE DVX AQUITANIE
  - Edward, by the grace of God, King of England, Lord of Ireland, Duke of Aquitaine.
- Edward III. EDWARDVS DEI GRACIA REX ANGLIE D[OMI]N[V]S HIBERNIE ET AQUITANIE
  - Edward, by the grace of God, King of England, Lord of Ireland and of Aquitaine.
- Richard II. RICARDVS DEI GRACIA REX FRANCIE ET ANGLIE ET D[OMI]N[V]S HIBERNIE
  - Richard, by the grace of God, King of France and England and Lord of Ireland.
- Henry IV. HENRICVS DEI GRACIA REX FRANCIE ET ANGLIE ET D[OMI]N[V]S HIBERNIE
  - Henry, by the grace of God, King of France and England and Lord of Ireland.
- Henry V. HENRICVS DEI GRACIA REX FRANCIE ET ANGLIE ET D[OMI]N[V]S HIBERNIE / HENRICVS DEI GRACIA REX ANGLIE ET FRANCIE ET DOMINUS HIBERNIE
  - Henry, by the grace of God, King of France and England and Lord of Ireland / Henry, by the grace of God, King of England and France and Lord of Ireland.
- Henry VI. HENRICVS DEI GRACIA FRANCORVM ET ANGLIE REX
  - Henry, by the grace of God, of the French and of England, King.
- Edward IV. EDWARDVS DEI GRACIA REX ANGLIE & FRANCIE ET DOMINVS HIBERNIE
  - Edward, by the grace of God, King of England and France and Lord of Ireland.
- Richard III. RICARDVS DEI GRACIA REX ANGLIE ET FRANCIE ET DOMINVS HIBERNIE
  - Richard, by the grace of God, King of England and France and Lord of Ireland.
- Henry VII. HENRICVS DEI GRACIA REX ANGLIE ET FRANCIE ET DOMINVS HIBERNIE
  - Henry, by the grace of God, King of England and France and Lord of Ireland.
- Henry VIII. HENRICVS OCTAV[V]S DEI GRATIA ANGLIE ET FRANCIE ET HIBERNIE REX FIDEI DEFE[N]SOR ET [IN] TER[R]A ECCLESIA[E] A[N]GLICANE ET HIBERNICE SVPREM[VM] CA[PVT]
  - Henry the Eighth, by the grace of God, of England and France and Ireland King, Defender of the Faith, and on Earth, of the English and Irish Church, Supreme Head.
- Edward VI. ... EDWARDI SEXTI DEI GRATIA ANGLIE FRANCIE / ET HIBERNIE REX FIDEI DEFE[N]SOR ET IN TERRA ECCLESIE ANGLICANE ET HIBERNICE SVPREMVM CAPVT
  - ... of Edward the Sixth, by the grace of God of England, France / and of Ireland King, Defender of the Faith, and on Earth, of the English and Irish Church, Supreme Head.

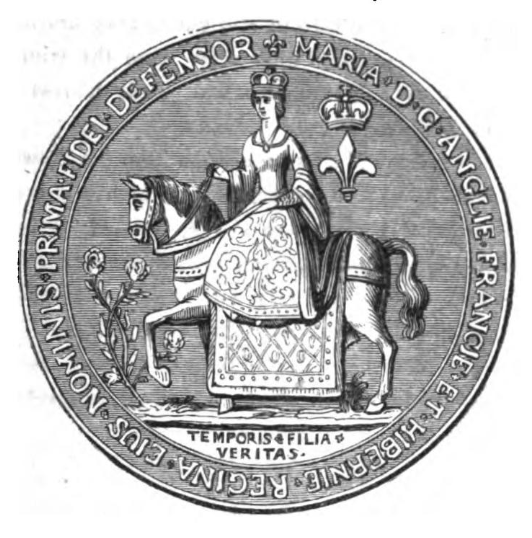
Seal of Mary I

- Mary I. MARIA D[EI] G[RATIA] ANGLIE FRANCIE ET HIBERNIE REGINA EIVS NOMINIS PRIMA FIDEI DEFENSOR
  - Mary, by the grace of God, of England, France and Ireland, Queen, first of that name, Defender of the Faith.
- Philip and Mary I. PHILIP ET MARIA D G REX ET REGINA ANGL HISPANIAR FRANC VTRIVSQ SICILE IERVSALEM ET HIB FIDEI DEFENSOR
  - Philip and Mary by the grace of God King and Queen of England, the Spains, France, both Sicilies, Jerusalem and Ireland, Defender of the Faith
- Elizabeth I. ELIZABETHA DEI GRACIA ANGLIE FRANCIE ET HIBERNIE REGINA FIDEI DEFENSOR
  - Elizabeth, by the grace of God, of England, France and Ireland, Queen, Defender of the Faith.

=== Union of the Crowns ===
Sovereign	Period	Latin inscriptions	Translations
James VI and I	1st seal 19 July 1603–1605 2nd seal 1605–1625	iacobvs dei gracia angliæ scotiæ franciæ et hiberniæ rex fidei defensor (seal and counterseal)	James, by the grace of God of England, Scotland, France, and Ireland King, Defender of the Faith.
Charles I	1st seal 1625–1627	carolvs dei gratia magnæ britannie franciæ et hiberniæ rex fidei def &c.	Charles, by the grace of God of Great Britain, France, and Ireland King, Defender of the Faith, et cetera.
Charles I	1st seal 1625–1627	carolvs dei gratia magnæ britanniæ franciæ et hiberniæ rex fidei defensor &c. (counterseal)	Charles, by the grace of God of Great Britain, France, and Ireland King, Defender of the Faith, et cetera.
Charles I	2nd seal 1627–1640	· carolvs · dei · gratia · angliæ · scotiæ · franciæ · et · hiberniæ · rex · fidei · defensor · 1627.	Charles, by the grace of God of England, Scotland, France, and Ireland King, Defender of the Faith, 1627.
Charles I	2nd seal 1627–1640	carolvs · dei · gratia · angliæ · scotiæ · franciæ · et · hiberniæ · rex · fidei · defensor ·(counterseal)	Charles, by the grace of God of England, Scotland, France, and Ireland King, Defender of the Faith.
Charles I	3rd seal 1640 – May 1646	carolvs · dei · gratia · magnæ · britanniæ · franciæ · et · hiberniæ · rex · fidei · defensor. 1640.	Charles, by the grace of God of Great Britain, France, and Ireland King, Defender of the Faith, 1640.
Charles I	3rd seal 1640 – May 1646	carolvs · dei · gratia · magnæ · britanniæ · franciæ · et · hiberniæ · rex · fidei · defensor. 16—40. (counterseal)	Charles, by the grace of God of Great Britain, France, and Ireland King, Defender of the Faith, 1640.
Charles I	4th seal 30 November 1643–7 February 1649	carolvs · dei · gratia · magnæ · britanniæ · franciæ · et · hiberniæ · rex · fidei · defensor. 1643.	Charles, by the grace of God of Great Britain, France, and Ireland King, Defender of the Faith, 1643.
Charles I	4th seal 30 November 1643–7 February 1649	carolvs · dei · gratia · magnæ · britanniæ · franciæ · et · hiberniæ · rex · fidei · defensor. 16—43. (counterseal)	Charles, by the grace of God of Great Britain, France, and Ireland King, Defender of the Faith, 1643.

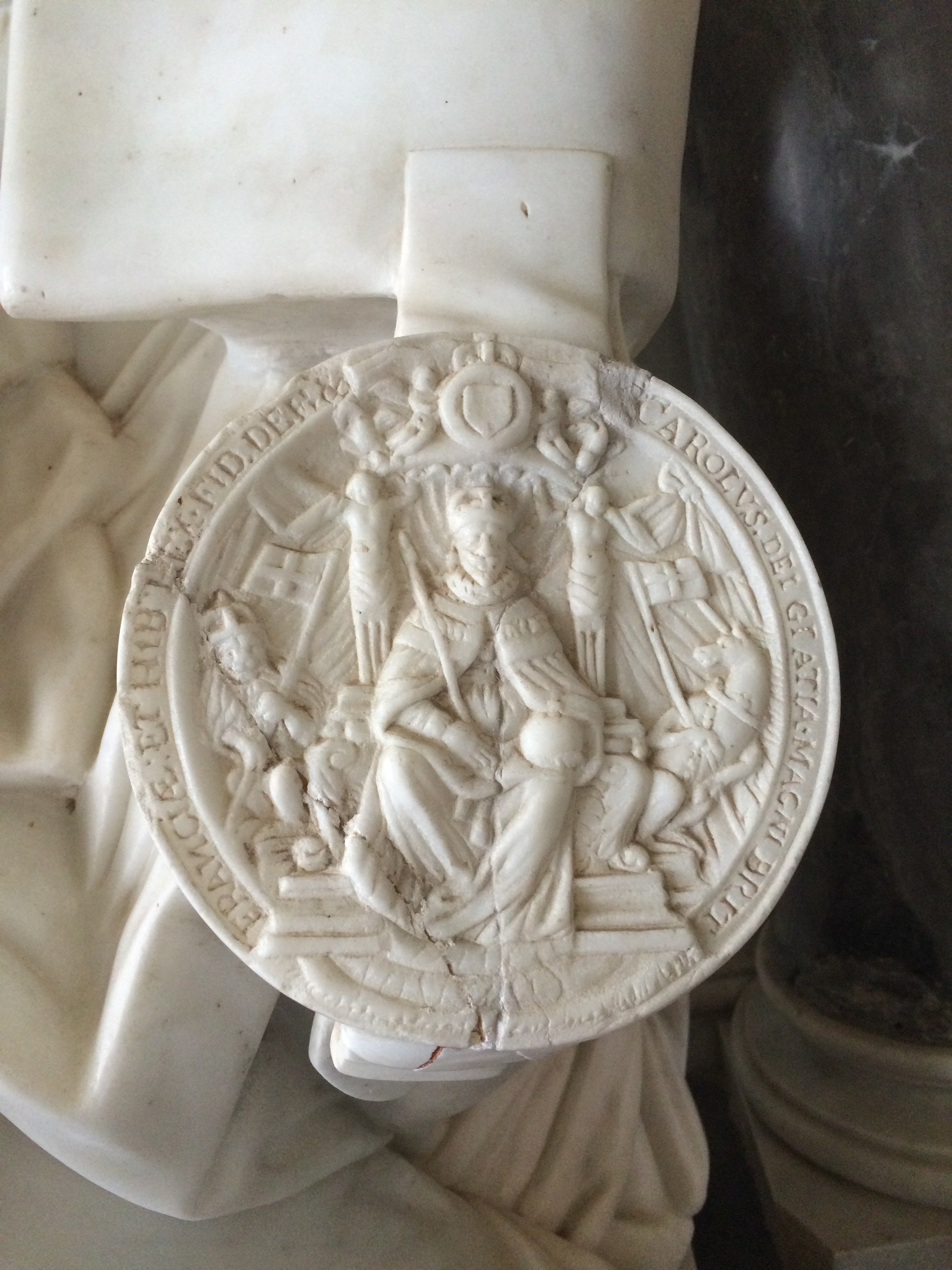
Depiction of the Great Seal of the Realm (Charles I) on a 17th-century funerary monument (St Mary Magdalene's Church, Croome D'Abitot, Worcestershire)

=== Interregnum ===
	Great Seal	Period	Inscriptions	Translations
Commonwealth		1st seal 8 February 1649–26 March 1651	the great seale of england 1648.	
Commonwealth		1st seal 8 February 1649–26 March 1651	in the first yeare of freedome by god's blessing restored, 1648. (counterseal)	
Commonwealth		2nd seal 26 March 1651–c. 1658 (1st period) 14 May 1659–28 May 1660 (2nd period)	the · great · seale · of · england · 1651.	
Commonwealth		2nd seal 26 March 1651–c. 1658 (1st period) 14 May 1659–28 May 1660 (2nd period)	in · the · third · yeare · of · freedome · by · god's · blessing · restored · 1651. (counterseal)	
Oliver Cromwell		1st seal 1655–1657 2nd seal 1657–1659	magnum · sigillum · reipub · angliæ · scotiæ · et · hiberniæ · &^{cte.}	The Great Seal of the Commonwealth of England, Scotland, and Ireland, et cetera.
Oliver Cromwell		1st seal 1655–1657 2nd seal 1657–1659	olivarius · dei · gra · reip · angliæ · scotiæ · et · hiberniæ · &c · protector · (counterseal)	Oliver, by the grace of God of the Commonwealth of England, Scotland, and Ireland, et cetera, Protector.
Richard Cromwell		1658–14 May 1659	magnum sigillum repub angliæ scotiæ et hiberniæ &^{cte}	The Great Seal of the Commonwealth of England, Scotland, and Ireland, et cetera.
Richard Cromwell		1658–14 May 1659	richardus dei gra republic angliæ scotiæ et hiberniæ &c protector (counterseal)	Richard, by the grace of God of the Commonwealth of England, Scotland, and Ireland, et cetera, Protector.

=== Restoration ===
Sovereign	Great Seal	Period	Latin inscriptions	Translations
Charles II		1st seal 1649–1651	unknown	
Charles II		2nd seal 1653–17 June 1663	carolus ii dei gratia magnæ britanniæ franciæ et hiber · rex fidei defensor · 1653.	Charles II, by the grace of God of Great Britain, France, and Ireland King, Defender of the Faith, 1653.
Charles II		2nd seal 1653–17 June 1663	carolus ii dei gratia magnæ britanniæ franciæ et hiberniæ rex fidei defensor · 1653. (counterseal)	Charles II, by the grace of God of Great Britain, France, and Ireland King, Defender of the Faith, 1653.
Charles II		3rd seal 17 June 1663–19 April 1672	carolus · ii · dei · gra · mag · britan · fran · et · hib · rex · fid · defensor ·	Charles II, by the grace of God of Great Britain, France, and Ireland King, Defender of the Faith.
Charles II		3rd seal 17 June 1663–19 April 1672	carolus · ii · dei · gratia · mag · britanniæ · franciæ · et · hiberniæ · rex · fidei · defensor. (counterseal)	Charles II, by the grace of God of Great Britain, France, and Ireland King, Defender of the Faith.
Charles II		4th seal 19 April 1672–21 October 1685	carolvs · secundus · d · gra · mag · bri · fra · et · hib · rex · fid · defensor.	Charles the Second, by the grace of God of Great Britain, France, and Ireland King, Defender of the Faith.
Charles II		4th seal 19 April 1672–21 October 1685	carolus · secundus · dei · gratia · magnæ · britanniæ · franciæ · et · hiberniæ · rex · fidei · defensor. (counterseal)	Charles the Second, by the grace of God of Great Britain, France, and Ireland King, Defender of the Faith.
James VII and II		21 October 1685–10 December 1688	iacobus · secundus · d · gra · mag · bri · fra · et · hib · rex · fid · defensor · &c.	James the Second, by the grace of God of Great Britain, France, and Ireland King, Defender of the Faith, et cetera.
James VII and II		21 October 1685–10 December 1688	iacobus secundus dei gratia magnæ britanniæ franciæ et hiberniæ rex fidei defensor &c. (counterseal)	James the Second, by the grace of God of Great Britain, France, and Ireland King, Defender of the Faith, et cetera.
William III and Mary II		1689–1695	gulielmus · iii · et · maria · ii · dei · gra · ang · fra · et · hib · rex · et · regina · fidei · defensores · &	William III and Mary II, by the grace of God of England, France, and Ireland King and Queen, Defenders of the Faith, et cetera.
William III and Mary II		1689–1695	gulielm · iii · et · maria · ii · dei · gra · ang · fra · et · hib · rex et · regina · fidei · defensores · & (counterseal)	William III and Mary II, by the grace of God of England, France, and Ireland King and Queen, Defenders of the Faith, et cetera.
William III		1695–11 November 1702	gulielmus · iii · d · gra · mag · bri · fra · et · hib · rex · fidei · defensor · &c.	William III, by the grace of God of Great Britain, France, and Ireland King, Defender of the Faith, et cetera.
William III		1695–11 November 1702	gulielmus · iii · secundus · dei · gratia · magnæ · britanniæ · franciæ · et · hiberniæ · rex · fidei · defensor · &c. (counterseal)	William III, by the grace of God of Great Britain, France, and Ireland King, Defender of the Faith, et cetera.
Anne		1st seal 11 November 1702–1707	· anna · dei · gratia · magnæ · britanniæ · · franciæ · · et · hiberniæ · regina · fid · defensor · etc.	Anne, by the grace of God of Great Britain, France, and Ireland Queen, Defender of the Faith, et cetera.
Anne		1st seal 11 November 1702–1707	· anna · dei · gratia · magnæ · britanniæ · · franciæ · et · hiberniæ · regina · fid · def · e^{tc}. (counterseal)	Anne, by the grace of God of Great Britain, France, and Ireland Queen, Defender of the Faith, et cetera.

=== Kingdom of Great Britain ===
Sovereign	Great Seal	Period	Latin inscriptions	Translations
Anne		2nd seal 1707–17 June 1715	anna · dei · gratia · magnæ · britanniæ · franciæ · et · hiberniæ · regina · fidei · defensor · etc.	Anne, by the grace of God of Great Britain, France, and Ireland Queen, Defender of the Faith, et cetera.
Anne		2nd seal 1707–17 June 1715	britannia · anno · regnæ · annæ · reginæ · sexto. (counterseal)	Britannia, in the sixth year of Queen Anne.
George I		17 June 1715–12 June 1728	georgius · dei · gratia · magnæ · britanniæ · franciæ · et · hiberniæ · rex · fidei · defen	George, by the grace of God of Great Britain, France, and Ireland King, Defender of the Faith, ...
George I		17 June 1715–12 June 1728	brunswicen · et · lunebergen · dux · sacri · romani · imperii · archithesaurarius · et · princeps · elect · et^{c} (counterseal)	... of Brunswick and Lüneburg Duke, of the Holy Roman Empire Arch-treasurer and Prince-Elector, et cetera.
George II		12 June 1728–3 August 1764	georgius · ii · dei · gratia · magnæ · britanniæ franciæ · et · hiberniæ · rex · fidei · defensor	George II, by the grace of God of Great Britain, France, and Ireland King, Defender of the Faith, ...
George II		12 June 1728–3 August 1764	brunswicen · et · lunebergen · dux · sacri · romani · imperii · archithesaurarius · et · princeps · elect · et^{c} (counterseal)	... of Brunswick and Lüneburg Duke, of the Holy Roman Empire Arch-treasurer and Prince-Elector, et cetera.
George III		1st seal 3 August 1764–23 March 1784	georgius · iii · dei · gratia · magnæ · britanniæ · franciæ · et · hiberniæ · rex· fidei · defensor	George III, by the grace of God of Great Britain, France, and Ireland King, Defender of the Faith, ...
George III		1st seal 3 August 1764–23 March 1784	brvnswicen · et · lvnebvrgen · dvx · sacri · romani · imperii · archithesavrarivs · et · princeps · elect · et^{c} (counterseal)	... of Brunswick and Lüneburg Duke, of the Holy Roman Empire Arch-treasurer and Prince-Elector, et cetera.
George III		2nd seal 25 March 1784–15 April 1785	georgius · iii · dei · gratia · magnæ · britanniæ · franciæ · et · hiberniæ · rex· fidei · defensor	George III, by the grace of God of Great Britain, France, and Ireland King, Defender of the Faith, ...
George III		2nd seal 25 March 1784–15 April 1785	brvnswicen · et · lvnebvrgen · dvx · sacri · romani · imperii · archithesavrarivs · et · princeps · elect · et^{c} (counterseal)	... of Brunswick and Lüneburg Duke, of the Holy Roman Empire Arch-treasurer and Prince-Elector, et cetera.
George III		3rd seal 15 April 1785–1 January 1801	georgivs · iii · d · g · mag · brit · fr · et · hib · rex· f · d · brvns · et · lvn · dvx · s · r · i · a · t · et · pr · elect · et^{c}	George III, by the grace of God of Great Britain, France, and Ireland King, Defender of the Faith, of Brunswick and Lüneburg Duke, of the Holy Roman Empire Arch-treasurer and Prince-Elector, et cetera.
George III		3rd seal 15 April 1785–1 January 1801	georgivs · iii · d · g · mag · brit · fr · et · hib · rex· f · d · brvns · et · lvn · dvx · s · r · i · a · t · et · pr · elect · et^{c} (counterseal)	George III, by the grace of God of Great Britain, France, and Ireland King, Defender of the Faith, of Brunswick and Lüneburg Duke, of the Holy Roman Empire Arch-treasurer and Prince-Elector, et cetera.

=== United Kingdom ===
Sovereign	Great Seal	Period	Latin inscriptions	Translations
George III		4th seal 1 January 1801–1 August 1815	georgivs iii · d · g · britanniarvm · rex · f · d · brvns · et · lvn · dvx s · r · i · a · t · et · pr · elect · et^{c}.	George III, by the grace of God of the Britains King, Defender of the Faith, of Brunswick and Lüneburg Duke, of the Holy Roman Empire Arch-treasurer and Prince-Elector, et cetera.
George III		4th seal 1 January 1801–1 August 1815	georgivs iii · d · g · britanniarvm · rex · f · d · brvns · et · lvn · dvx s · r · i · a · t · et · pr · elect · et^{c}. (counterseal)	George III, by the grace of God of the Britains King, Defender of the Faith, of Brunswick and Lüneburg Duke, of the Holy Roman Empire Arch-treasurer and Prince-Elector, et cetera.
George III		5th seal 1 August 1815–17 September 1821	· georgius · tertius · dei · gratia · britanniarum · rex · fidei · defensor.	George the Third, by the grace of God of the Britains King, Defender of the Faith.
George III		5th seal 1 August 1815–17 September 1821	et in terra ecclesiæ anglicanæ et hibernicæ supremum caput. (counterseal)	and, on Earth, of the Anglican and Hibernican Church the Supreme Head.
George IV		17 September 1821–31 August 1831	· georgius · quartus · dei · gratia · britanniarum · rex · fidei · defensor.	George the Fourth, by the grace of God of the Britains King, Defender of the Faith.
William IV		31 August 1831–18 July 1838	· guilielmus · quartus · dei · gratia · britanniarum · rex · fidei · defensor.	William the Fourth, by the grace of God of the Britains King, Defender of the Faith.
Victoria		1st seal 18 July 1838–23 January 1860	· victoria · dei · gratia · britanniarum · regina · fidei · defensor	Victoria, by the grace of God of the Britains Queen, Defender of the Faith.
Victoria		2nd seal 23 January 1860–14 August 1878	· victoria · dei · gratia · britanniarum · regina · fidei · defensor	Victoria, by the grace of God of the Britains Queen, Defender of the Faith.
Victoria		3rd seal 14 August 1878–1899	· victoria · dei · gratia · britanniarum · regina · fidei · defensor	Victoria, by the grace of God of the Britains Queen, Defender of the Faith.
Victoria		4th seal 1899–1904	· victoria · dei · gratia · britanniarum · regina · fid · def · ind · imp ·	Victoria, by the grace of God of the Britains Queen, Defender of the Faith; of India, Empress.
Edward VII		1904–13 February 1912	edwardvs vii d:g: britt: et terrarvm transmar: qvæ in dit: svnt brit: rex f:d: ind: imp:	Edward VII, by the grace of God of the Britains and of the lands across the sea which are in the British Dominion King, Defender of the Faith; of India, Emperor.
George V		1st seal 13 February 1912–28 March 1930	georgivs v d:g: britt: et terrarvm transmar: qvæ in dit: svnt brit: rex f:d: ind: imp:	George V, by the grace of God of the Britains and of the lands across the sea which are in the British Dominion King, Defender of the Faith; of India, Emperor.
George V		2nd seal 28 March 1930–28 February 1938	georgivs· v· d·g· mag· br· hib· et terr· transmar· qvae· in· dit· svnt· brit· rex· f·d· ind· imp·	George V, by the grace of God of Great Britain, Ireland, and the Lands across the sea which are in the British Dominion King, Defender of the Faith; of India, Emperor.
George VI		1st seal (Note: The revision of the royal style consequent on the Indian Independence Act 1947 did not result in the design of an entirely new Great Seal; instead, Percy Metcalfe recut the inscription on George Kruger Gray's 1938 model for the existing seal. The counterseal was unchanged.) 28 February 1938–February 1948	georgius· vi· d·g· mag· br· hib· &· terr· transmar· quae· in· dit· sunt· brit· rex· f·d· ind· imp·	George VI, by the grace of God of Great Britain, Ireland, and the Lands across the sea which are in the British Dominion, King, Defender of the Faith; of India, Emperor.
George VI		1st seal 28 February 1938–February 1948	georgius vi: d:g: rex (counterseal)	George VI, by the grace of God King.
George VI		2nd seal February 1948–1953	georgius vi: d:g: rex (counterseal)	George VI, by the grace of God King.
George VI		2nd seal February 1948–1953	georgius· vi· d·g· mag· br· hib· &· terr· transmar· quae· in· dit· sunt· brit· rex· fidei· def·	George VI, by the grace of God of Great Britain, Ireland, and the Lands across the sea which are in the British Dominion, King, Defender of the Faith.
Elizabeth II		1st seal 1953–18 July 2001	elizabeth· ii· d·g· britt· regnorvmqve svorvmqve ceter· regina consortionis popvlorvm princeps f·d🕂 (obverse)	Elizabeth II, by the grace of God of the Britains and of her other realms Queen, Head of the Commonwealth, Defender of the Faith.
Elizabeth II		1st seal 1953–18 July 2001	elizabeth · ii · dei · gratia · britann·iarvm · regina · fidei· defensor (reverse)	Elizabeth II, by the grace of God of the Britains Queen, Defender of the Faith.
Elizabeth II		2nd seal 18 July 2001–2025	elizabeth · ii · d·g· britt · regnorvmqve · svorvmqve ceter · regina · consortionis · popvlorvm · princeps · f·d	Elizabeth II, by the grace of God of the Britains and of her other realms Queen, Head of the Commonwealth, Defender of the Faith.
Charles III		6 May 2025–present	charles · iii · dei · gratia · britanniarvm · regnorvmqve · svorvmqve ceterorvm · rex · consortionis · popvlorvm · princeps · fid · def	Charles III, by the grace of God of the Britains and of his other realms King, Head of the Commonwealth, Defender of the Faith.

== See also ==
- Great Seal
- Great Seal of Northern Ireland
- Great Seal of Scotland
- Welsh Seal

== Bibliography ==
- Bedos-Rezak, Brigitte (1986). "The King Enthroned, a New Theme in Anglo-Saxon Royal Iconography: The Seal of Edward the Confessor and Its Political Implications". In Rosenthal, J. T. (ed.). Kings and Kingship. Binghamton, NY: Center for Medieval and Early Renaissance Studies, State University of New York. pp. 53–88.
- Harvey, P. D. A.; McGuinness, Andrew (1996). A Guide to British Medieval Seals. London: British Library and Public Record Office. pp. 27–34. ISBN 0-7123-0410-X.
- Jenkinson, Hilary (1936a). "The Great Seal of England: deputed or departmental seals". Archaeologia. 85: 293–340. doi:10.1017/s026134090001523x.
- Jenkinson, Hilary (1936b). "The Great Seal of England: some notes and suggestions". Antiquaries Journal. 16: 8–28. doi:10.1017/s0003581500011355. S2CID 162671803.
- Jenkinson, Hilary (1938). "A new seal of Henry V". Antiquaries Journal. 18: 382–90. doi:10.1017/s0003581500015547. S2CID 159578757.
- Jenkinson, Hilary (1953). "The Great Seal of England". Journal of the Royal Society of Arts. 101: 550–63.
- Maxwell Lyte, Sir Henry C. (1926). Historical Notes on the Use of the Great Seal of England. London: HMSO.
- Perceval, R. W. (1948). "The Great Seal". Parliamentary Affairs. 1 (4): 40–46.
- Wyon, Alfred Benjamin; Wyon, Allan (1887). The Great Seals of England: From the Earliest Period to the Present Time, Arranged and Illustrated with Descriptive and Historical Notes. London: Elliot Stock.
