= Crown Office =

Crown Office may refer to:

- Crown Office in Chancery, a department under the Ministry of Justice in the United Kingdom
- Crown Office and Procurator Fiscal Service, a department of the Scottish government
