= Style of the British sovereign =

Way of addressing the monarch of the United Kingdom

The precise style of the British sovereign is chosen and proclaimed by the sovereign, in accordance with the Royal Titles Act 1953. The current sovereign, King Charles III, was proclaimed by the Privy Council (on his behalf) in 2022 to have acceded to the throne with the style:

Charles the Third, by the Grace of God of the United Kingdom of Great Britain and Northern Ireland and of His other Realms and Territories, King, Head of the Commonwealth, Defender of the Faith

== Early history ==
The Anglo-Saxon kings of England used numerous different styles, including "King of the Anglo-Saxons" and "King of the English". Grander variations were adopted by some monarchs; for example, Eadred (r. 946–955) used "King of the Anglo-Saxons, Northumbrians, pagans and Britons". These styles were sometimes accompanied by extravagant epithets; for instance, Æthelstan (r. 924–939) was "King of the English, raised by the right hand of the Almighty to the Throne of the whole Kingdom of Britain".

Henry VIII's reign saw the use of five different royal styles.

In Scotland the title of the monarch was usually "King/Queen of Scots" rather than "of Scotland" (although the latter was sometimes used).

William I (r. 1066–1087), the first Norman monarch of England, used the simple "King of the English". His successor, William II, was the first consistently to use "by the Grace of God". Henry I added "Duke of the Normans" in 1121, though he had seized Normandy from his brother Robert in 1106. In 1152 Henry II acquired many further French possessions through his marriage to Eleanor of Aquitaine; soon thereafter, he added "Duke of the Aquitanians" and "Count of the Angevins" to his style.

"King of the English", "Duke of the Normans", "Duke of the Aquitanians" and "Count of the Angevins" remained in use until King John ascended the throne in 1199, when they changed to "King of England", "Duke of Normandy", "Duke of Aquitaine" and "Count of Anjou", respectively. John, furthermore, was already the titular ruler of Ireland; therefore, he added "Lord of Ireland" to his style.

In 1204 England lost both Normandy and Anjou. Nevertheless, they did not renounce the associated titles until 1259. French territory once again became the subject of dispute after the death of the French King Charles IV in 1328. Edward III claimed the French throne, arguing that it was to pass to him through his mother Isabella, Charles IV's sister. In France, however, it was asserted that the throne could not pass to or through a woman. Edward III began to use the title "King of France" (dropping "Duke of Aquitaine") after 1337. In 1340 he entered France, where he was publicly proclaimed King. In 1360, however, he agreed to relinquish his title to the French claimant. Though he stopped using the title in legal documents, he did not formally exchange letters confirming the renunciation with the French King. In 1369 Edward III resumed the title, claiming that the French had breached their treaty.

Henry V invaded France, but agreed to the Treaty of Troyes, whereby he was recognised as the Heir and Regent of France, in 1420. He died in 1422, to be succeeded by his infant son, who became Henry VI. Shortly after his accession, Henry VI also inherited the French throne. By the 1450s, however, England had lost all its territories in France, with the exception of Calais. The claim to the title of "King of France" was nonetheless not relinquished until the creation of the United Kingdom of Great Britain and Ireland in 1801, by which time the French monarchy had been overthrown by the French Revolution.

After 1422, the royal style remained unchanged for almost a century. Numerous amendments, however, were effected during Henry VIII's reign. After Henry wrote a book against the Protestant Martin Luther, Pope Leo X rewarded him by granting the title "Defender of the Faith". After disagreements with the Papacy over his marriage to Catherine of Aragon, Henry VIII broke away from the Roman Catholic Church, establishing the Church of England in 1533. Pope Paul III rescinded the grant of the title "Defender of the Faith", but Henry continued to use it. In 1535 Henry added "of the Church of England in Earth, under Jesus Christ, Supreme Head" to his style in 1535; a reference to the Church of Ireland was added in 1536. Meanwhile, advised that many Irish people regarded the pope as the true temporal authority in their nation, with the king of England acting as a mere representative, Henry VIII changed "Lord of Ireland" to "King of Ireland" in 1542. All changes made by Henry VIII were confirmed by an English act of Parliament passed in 1544, the King's Style Act 1543 (35 Hen. 8. c. 3)

Mary I, Henry VIII's Catholic daughter, omitted "of the Church of England and also of Ireland in Earth Supreme Head" in 1553, replacing it with "etc.", but the phrase remained part of the official style until an act of Parliament was passed in 1555, repealing the King's Style Act 1543. In the meantime Mary had married the Spanish prince Philip. The monarchs adopted a joint style, "King and Queen of England and France, Naples, Jerusalem and Ireland, Defenders of the Faith, Princes of Spain and Sicily, Archdukes of Austria, Dukes of Milan, Burgundy and Brabant, Count and Countess of Habsburg, Flanders and Tyrol", acknowledging both Mary's and Philip's titles. Further changes were made after Philip became King of Spain and Sicily upon his father's abdication.

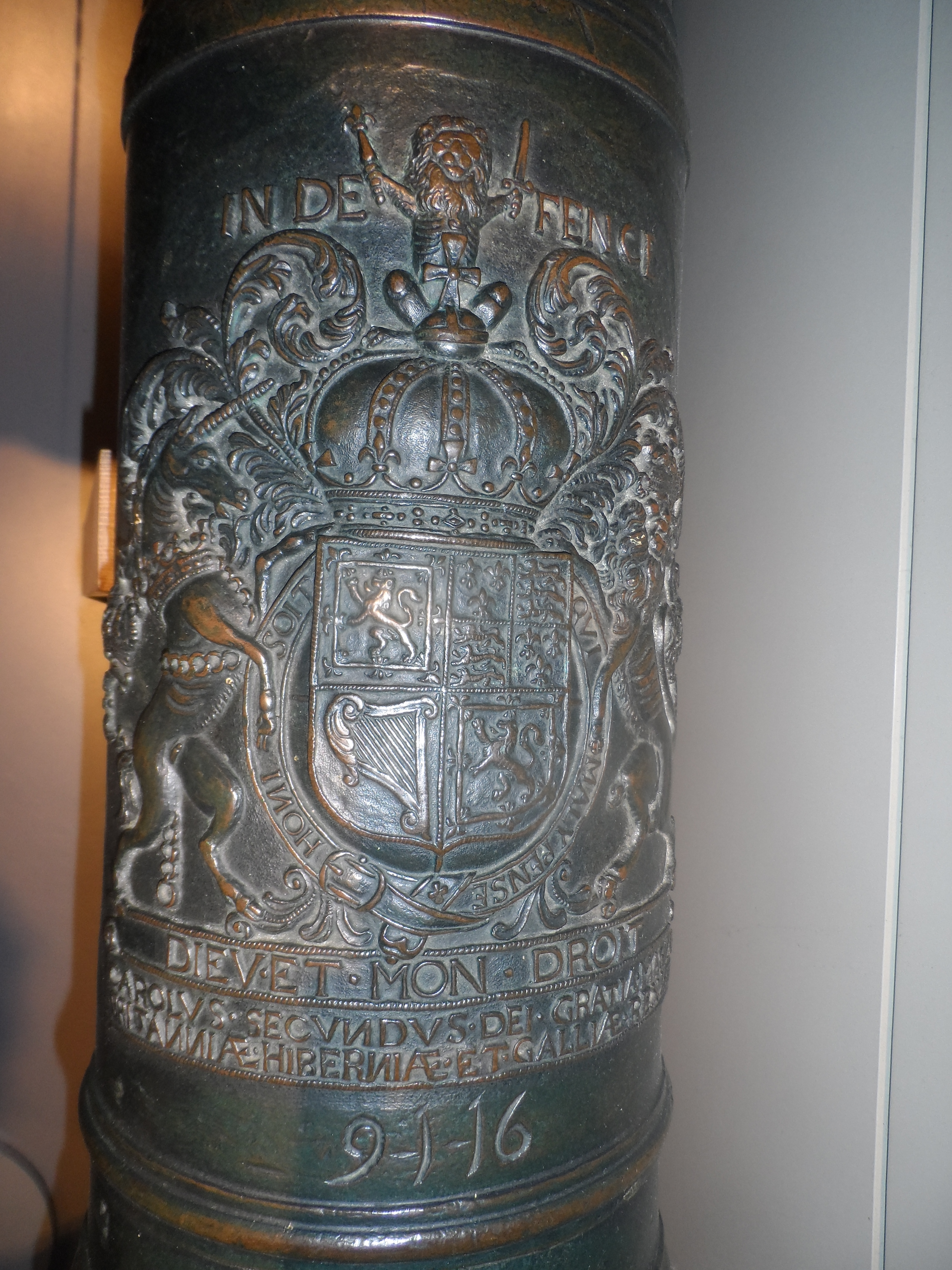
Cannon of Charles II, with Latin text Britanniæ, Hiberniæ et Galliæ rex ("King of Britain, Ireland and Gaul")

When the Protestant Elizabeth I ascended the throne, she used the simpler "Queen of England, France and Ireland, Defender of the Faith, etc.". The "etc." was added in anticipation of a restoration of the supremacy phrase, which never actually occurred.

After James VI of Scotland, ascended the English throne, the official style changed to "King of England, Scotland, France and Ireland, Defender of the Faith, etc."; his mother Mary, Queen of Scots, had already laid claim to these titles (in a different order, jointly with Francis II of France, then with the King's father, Lord Darnley), but she was beheaded by her Protestant opponent, Elizabeth I. In 1604 James VI made a proclamation permitting the use of "King of Great Britain" instead of "King of England and Scotland". This new style, though commonly used to refer to the King, was never statutory; therefore, it did not appear on legal instruments. It did, however, appear on the inscriptions on coins.

== Union and after ==
The kingdoms of England and Scotland were formally united into a single Kingdom of Great Britain in 1707 by the Acts of Union. Queen Anne consequently assumed the style "Queen of Great Britain, France and Ireland, Defender of the Faith, etc." It remained in use until 1801, when Great Britain and Ireland combined to become the United Kingdom. George III used the opportunity to drop both the reference to France and "etc." from the style. It was suggested to him that he assume the title "Emperor", but he rejected the proposal. Instead, the style became "King of the United Kingdom of Great Britain and Ireland, Defender of the Faith".

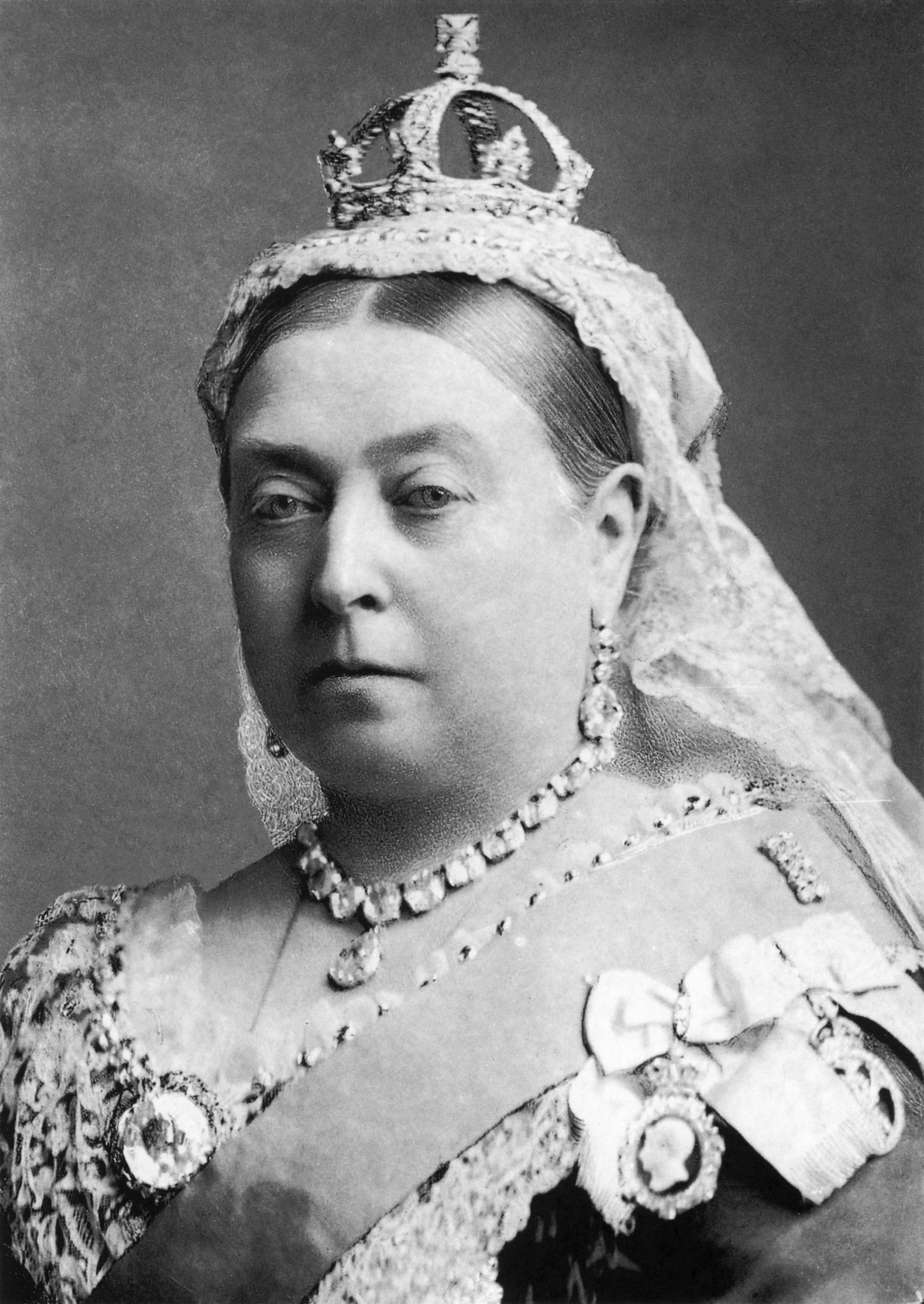
Queen Victoria was the first British monarch to use the style "Empress of India".

The style used by Victoria in her proclamation to "the Princes, Chiefs and People of India" in 1858 was: "Victoria, by the Grace of God of the United Kingdom of Great Britain and Ireland, and of the Colonies and Dependencies thereof in Europe, Asia, Africa, America, and Australasia, Queen, Defender of the Faith".

In 1876 "Empress of India" was added to Queen Victoria's titles by the Royal Titles Act 1876. The prime minister, Benjamin Disraeli, recommended the additional title, partly perhaps to please the Queen, but also so that she, the ruler of a vast empire, would not be outranked by her own daughter, Victoria, who had married the heir to the German Empire.

Queen Victoria's successor, Edward VII, had his royal style further changed by the Royal Titles Act 1901. This simplified the references to the monarch's various realms and captured the broader sweep of the United Kingdom's colonial possessions, with a broad substitution, inserting "and of the British Dominions beyond the Seas" after "Ireland". In general usage the monarch came to be called the King-Emperor, especially in the Crown's overseas possessions and in British India and the princely states.

== Dominions and Commonwealth realms ==
In 1922 the Irish Free State gained independence. In 1927 the Royal and Parliamentary Titles Act 1927 changed the description "of the United Kingdom of Great Britain and Ireland and of the British Dominions beyond the Seas" to "of Great Britain, Ireland and the British Dominions beyond the Seas". The 1927 Act was also significant for opening the door to dominions (later Commonwealth realms) having the right to determine their own style and title for the sovereign, a right which was first exercised in 1953.

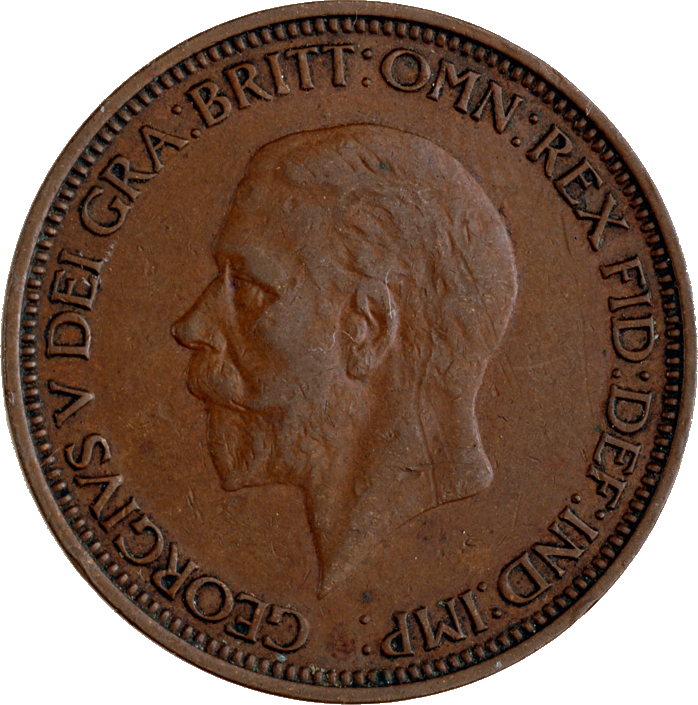
Coin of King George V, marked in Latin Georgivs V Dei gra: Britt: omn: rex fid: def: Ind: imp: (Georgius V, Dei gratiâ Britanniarum omnium rex, fidei defensor, Indiae imperator; "George V, by the grace of God king of all the Britains [or 'of all the British lands'], defender of the faith, Emperor of India"

The designation "Emperor of India" was dropped from the royal style in 1948 after the independence of India and Pakistan a year earlier, even though King George VI remained king of the transitional nation state known as the dominion of India until 1950, when it became a republic (staying within the Commonwealth). The dominion of Pakistan likewise existed between 1947 and 1956, when it too became a republic within the Commonwealth. Similarly, although the republic of Ireland was constituted in 1949, "Great Britain and Ireland" was not replaced with "Great Britain and Northern Ireland" until 1953. In the same year the phrase "Head of the Commonwealth" was also added, and "British Dominions beyond the Seas" was replaced with "other Realms and Territories". Thus, the style of the present sovereign is "By the Grace of God, of the United Kingdom of Great Britain and Northern Ireland and of His other Realms and Territories King, Head of the Commonwealth, Defender of the Faith".

Also in 1953, separate styles were adopted for each of the realms over which the sovereign reigned (the Commonwealth realms). Most realms use the form "Queen/King of [nation], and of Her other Realms and Territories, Head of the Commonwealth", omitting the title "Defender of the Faith". When in the relevant country, or when acting as monarch thereof, the King or Queen is primarily styled by reference to their 'local' title: as, for example, "King of Australia" while Charles III is acting as such (or present therein). Initially, Australia, New Zealand and Canada all also included, in the local royal style, a reference singling out the United Kingdom, additionally, as well as the title "Defender of the Faith"; by 2024, all of them had dropped the reference to the United Kingdom, and only New Zealand still retained the title "Defender of the Faith". (Australia removed both the particular reference to the United Kingdom and the style Defender of the Faith in 1973; Canada dropped both of them in January 2024; New Zealand dropped its particular reference to the United Kingdom in 1974.) The rules vary according to the laws of the other 14 nations which maintain the monarch as head of state.

Canada also publishes an official style in the French language; certain other realms likewise have implemented formal styles and titles in local language(s) other than English.

== List of changes to the royal style ==
The proclamation of Elizabeth II, in 1953, was made in English and in Latin.

- in English:
  Elizabeth II, by the Grace of God of the United Kingdom of Great Britain and Northern Ireland and of Her other Realms and Territories Queen, Head of the Commonwealth, Defender of the Faith
- in Latin:
  Elizabeth II, Dei Gratia Britanniarum Regnorumque Suorum Ceterorum Regina, Consortionis Populorum Princeps, Fidei Defensor

Official styles of previous sovereigns are shown below. Heads of state who did not rule as king or as queen are shown in italics.

=== English sovereigns ===
Period	Style	User
1042–1087	Rex Anglorum (King of the English)	Edward the Confessor, Harold II, William I
1087–1121	Dei Gratia Rex Anglorum (By the Grace of God, King of the English)	William II, Henry I
1121–1154	Rex Anglorum, Dux Normannorum (King of the English, Duke of the Normans)	Henry I, Stephen
1141	Anglorum Domina (Lady of the English)	Matilda
1154–1199	Rex Angliae (King of England); Rex Anglorum (King of the English)	Henry II, Henry the Young King, Richard I
1199–1259	Dei gratia Rex Anglie, Dominus Hibernie, Dux Normannie et Aquitannie, Comes Andegavie (By the Grace of God, King of England, Lord of Ireland, Duke of Normandy and Aquitaine, Count of the Angevins)	John, Henry III
1259–1340	Rex Angliae, Dominus Hiberniae et Dux Aquitaniae (King of England, Lord of Ireland and Duke of Aquitaine)	Henry III, Edward I, Edward II, Edward III
1340–1397	Rex Angliae et Franciae et Dominus Hiberniae (King of England and of France and Lord of Ireland)	Edward III, Richard II
1397–1399	Rex Angliae et Franciae, Dominus Hiberniae et Princeps Cestriæ (King of England and of France, Lord of Ireland, and Prince of Chester)	Richard II
1399–1420	Rex Angliae et Franciae et Dominus Hiberniae (King of England and of France and Lord of Ireland)	Henry IV, Henry V
1420–1422	Rex Angliae, Haeres et Regens Franciae, et Dominus Hiberniae (King of England, Heir and Regent of France and Lord of Ireland)	Henry V, Henry VI
1422–1521^{a}	Rex Angliae et Franciae et Dominus Hiberniae (King of England and of France and Lord of Ireland)	Henry VI, Edward IV, Edward V, Richard III, Henry VII, Henry VIII
1521^{a}–1535	Dei gratia Rex Anglie et Francie, Fidei Defensor et Dominus Hibernie; By the Grace of God, King of England and France, Defender of the Faith and Lord of Ireland	Henry VIII (language change only)
1535–1536	Dei gratia Rex Anglie et Francie, Fidei Defensor, Dominus Hibernie, et in terra ecclesie Anglicane supremum caput By the Grace of God, King of England and France, Defender of the Faith, Lord of Ireland, and of the Church of England in Earth Supreme Head	Henry VIII (language change only)
1536–1542	Dei gratia Rex Anglie et Francie, Fidei Defensor, Dominus Hibernie, et in terra ecclesiae Anglicane et Hibernice supremum caput By the Grace of God, King of England and France, Defender of the Faith, Lord of Ireland, and of the Church of England and of Ireland on Earth Supreme Head	Henry VIII (language change only)
1542–1553	Dei gratia Anglie Francie et Hibernie Rex, Fidei Defensor, et in terra ecclesie Anglicane et Hibernice supremum caput By the Grace of God, King of England, France and Ireland, Defender of the Faith, and of the Church of England and also of Ireland on Earth Supreme Head^{b}	Henry VIII, Edward VI
1553–1554	Dei gratia Anglie Francie et Hibernie Regina, Fidei Defensor, et in terra ecclesie Anglicane et Hibernice supremum caput By the Grace of God, Queen of England, France and Ireland, Defender of the Faith, and of the Church of England and also of Ireland on Earth Supreme Head^{b}	Lady Jane Grey (disputed), Mary I
1554–1556	Dei Gratia Rex et Regina Anglie, Francie, Neapolis, Ierusalem, et Hibernie; Fidei Defensores; Principes Hispanie et Sicilie; Archiduces Austrie; Duces Mediolani, Burgundie, et Brabancie; Comites Haspurgi, Flandrie, et Tirolis; By the Grace of God, King and Queen of England and France, Naples, Jerusalem and Ireland, Defenders of the Faith, Princes of Spain and Sicily, Archdukes of Austria, Dukes of Milan, Burgundy, and Brabant, Count and Countess of Habsburg, Flanders, and Tyrol	Mary I and Philip
1556–1558	Dei gracia rex et regina Anglie Hispaniarum Francie utriusque Sicilie Ierusalem et Hibernie fidei defensores archiduces Austrie duces Burgundie Mediolani et Brabancie comites Haspurgi Flandrie et Tirolis; By the Grace of God, King and Queen of England, Spain, France, Jerusalem, both the Sicilies and Ireland, Defenders of the Faith, Archduke and Archduchess of Austria, Duke and Duchess of Burgundy, Milan and Brabant, Count and Countess of Habsburg, Flanders and Tyrol	Mary I and Philip
1558–1603	Dei gratia Anglie Francie et Hibernie Regina, Fidei Defensor, etc. By the Grace of God, Queen of England, France and Ireland, Defender of the Faith, etc.	Elizabeth I

- ^a In 1521 English replaced Latin as the official language of the regnal style.
- ^b ... "and of the Church of England and also of Ireland on Earth Supreme Head" omitted in formal use in early 1554 (omission retroactively approved by an act of Parliament assented to 16 Jan 1555)

=== Scottish sovereigns ===
The earliest recorded style of the monarchs of what is now Scotland varies: sometimes it is "King of the Picts", sometimes "King of Fortriu", and sometimes "King of Alba". Only after 900 does the latter title become standard. From the reign of David I, the title became either "rex Scottorum" ("King of Scots") or "rex Scotiae" ("King of Scotland"). The former term was the most common, but the latter was used sometimes. James VI and I proclaimed himself "King of Great Brittaine, France and Ireland” by Royal Proclamation, but this was not accepted by the English Parliament. The last three monarchs of Scotland—William II (William III of England), Mary II and Anne—all used "King/Queen of Scotland" in preference to "of Scots".

=== English and Scottish sovereigns ===
Period	Style	User(s)
1603–1689	By the Grace of God, King of England, Scotland, France and Ireland, Defender of the Faith, etc.	James VI & I, Charles I, Charles II, James VII & II
1650–1653	Captain-General and Commander-in-Chief of all the armies and forces raised and to be raised within the Commonwealth of England	Oliver Cromwell
1653–1659	By the Grace of God and of the Republic, Lord Protector of the Commonwealth of England, Scotland and Ireland, et cetera, and the Dominions and Territories thereunto belonging	Oliver Cromwell, Richard Cromwell
1689–1694	By the Grace of God, King and Queen of England, Scotland, France and Ireland, Stadtholder of the Republic of the Seven United Netherlands, Prince of Orange, Count of Nassau, Defenders of the Faith, etc.	William III and Mary II
1694–1702	By the Grace of God, King of England, Scotland, France and Ireland, Stadtholder of the Republic of the Seven United Netherlands, Prince of Orange, Count of Nassau, Defender of the Faith, etc.	William III
1702–1707	By the Grace of God, Queen of England, Scotland, France and Ireland, Defender of the Faith, etc.	Anne

=== British sovereigns ===
Period	Style	Sovereign(s)
1707–1714	by the Grace of God Queen of Great Britain, France and Ireland, Defender of the Faith, etc.	Anne
1714–1801	by the Grace of God King of Great Britain, France and Ireland, Defender of the Faith, Archtreasurer and Prince-Elector of the Holy Roman Empire, Duke of Brunswick-Luneburg	George I
1714–1801	by the Grace of God King of Great Britain, France and Ireland, Defender of the Faith, Archtreasurer and Prince-Elector of the Holy Roman Empire, Duke of Brunswick-Luneburg	George II
1714–1801	by the Grace of God King of Great Britain, France and Ireland, Defender of the Faith, Archtreasurer and Prince-Elector of the Holy Roman Empire, Duke of Brunswick-Luneburg	George III
1801–1814	by the Grace of God of the United Kingdom of Great Britain and Ireland King, Defender of the Faith, Arch-treasurer and Prince-Elector of the Holy Roman Empire, Duke of Brunswick-Luneburg (Note: This reflects the United Kingdom created by the Acts of Union 1800 and sheds the more than 400-year-old pretence to the throne of France)	George III
1814–1837	by the Grace of God of the United Kingdom of Great Britain and Ireland King, Defender of the Faith, King of Hanover, Duke of Brunswick-Luneburg	George III
1814–1837	by the Grace of God of the United Kingdom of Great Britain and Ireland King, Defender of the Faith, King of Hanover, Duke of Brunswick-Luneburg	George IV
1814–1837	by the Grace of God of the United Kingdom of Great Britain and Ireland King, Defender of the Faith, King of Hanover, Duke of Brunswick-Luneburg	William IV
1837–1876	by the Grace of God of the United Kingdom of Great Britain and Ireland Queen, Defender of the Faith	Victoria
1876–1901	by the Grace of God of the United Kingdom of Great Britain and Ireland Queen, Defender of the Faith, Empress of India	Victoria
1901	Dei Gratia Britanniarum Rex, Fidei Defensor, Indiae Imperator by the Grace of God of the United Kingdom of Great Britain and Ireland King, Defender of the Faith, Emperor of India	Edward VII
1901–1927	Dei Gratia Britanniarum et terrarum transmarinarum quae in ditione sunt Britannica Rex, Fidei Defensor, Indiae Imperator by the Grace of God of the United Kingdom of Great Britain and Ireland and of the British Dominions beyond the Seas King, Defender of the Faith, Emperor of India	Edward VII
1901–1927	Dei Gratia Britanniarum et terrarum transmarinarum quae in ditione sunt Britannica Rex, Fidei Defensor, Indiae Imperator by the Grace of God of the United Kingdom of Great Britain and Ireland and of the British Dominions beyond the Seas King, Defender of the Faith, Emperor of India	George V
1927–1948	Dei Gratia Magnae Britanniae, Hiberniae et terrarum transmarinarum quae in ditione sunt Britannica Rex, Fidei Defensor, Indiae Imperator by the Grace of God of Great Britain, Ireland and the British Dominions beyond the Seas King, Defender of the Faith, Emperor of India	George V
1927–1948	Dei Gratia Magnae Britanniae, Hiberniae et terrarum transmarinarum quae in ditione sunt Britannica Rex, Fidei Defensor, Indiae Imperator by the Grace of God of Great Britain, Ireland and the British Dominions beyond the Seas King, Defender of the Faith, Emperor of India	Edward VIII
1927–1948	Dei Gratia Magnae Britanniae, Hiberniae et terrarum transmarinarum quae in ditione sunt Britannica Rex, Fidei Defensor, Indiae Imperator by the Grace of God of Great Britain, Ireland and the British Dominions beyond the Seas King, Defender of the Faith, Emperor of India	George VI
1948–1952	Dei Gratia Magnae Britanniae, Hiberniae et terrarum transmarinarum quae in ditione sunt Britannica Rex, Fidei Defensor by the Grace of God of Great Britain, Ireland and the British Dominions beyond the Seas King, Defender of the Faith (Note: Recognising that in 1947 British India was partitioned into the two independent dominions of India and Pakistan.)	George VI
1952–1953	Dei Gratia Magnae Britanniae, Hiberniae et terrarum transmarinarum quae in ditione sunt Britannica Regina, Fidei Defensor by the Grace of God of Great Britain, Ireland and the British Dominions beyond the Seas Queen, Defender of the Faith	Elizabeth II
1953–2022	Dei Gratia Britanniarum Regnorumque Suorum Ceterorum Regina, Consortionis Populorum Princeps, Fidei Defensor by the Grace of God of the United Kingdom of Great Britain and Northern Ireland and of Her other Realms and Territories Queen, Head of the Commonwealth, Defender of the Faith (Note: Following the Royal Titles Act 1953)	Elizabeth II
2022–present	Dei Gratia Britanniarum Regnorumque Suorum Ceterorum Rex, Consortionis Populorum Princeps, Fidei Defensor by the Grace of God of the United Kingdom of Great Britain and Northern Ireland and of His other Realms and Territories, King, Head of the Commonwealth, Defender of the Faith (Note: Privy Council proclamation.)	Charles III

== See also ==
- Style of the Canadian sovereign
