= Royal and Parliamentary Titles Act 1927 =

Act of the Parliament of the United Kingdom

Royal and Parliamentary Titles Act 1927 (Note: Section 3.)
- Act of Parliament
- Parliament of the United Kingdom
- Long title: An Act to provide for the alteration of the Royal Style and Titles and of the Style of Parliament and for purposes incidental thereto.
- Citation: 17 & 18 Geo. 5. c. 4
- Territorial extent: United Kingdom

Dates
- Royal assent: 12 April 1927
- Commencement: 12 April 1927 (Note: The Acts of Parliament (Commencement) Act 1793.)
Other legislation
| Amended by | Statute Law Revision Act 1950; Statute Law (Repeals) Act 1977; Interpretation Act 1978 |
| Relates to | Royal Titles Act 1901; Royal Titles Act 1953 |

Status: Amended

Text of statute as originally enacted

Revised text of statute as amended

Text of the Royal and Parliamentary Titles Act 1927 as in force today (including any amendments) within the United Kingdom, from legislation.gov.uk.

The Royal and Parliamentary Titles Act 1927 (17 & 18 Geo. 5. c. 4) is an act of the Parliament of the United Kingdom that authorised the alteration of the British monarch's royal style and titles, and altered the formal name of the British Parliament and hence of the state, in recognition of most of Ireland separating from the United Kingdom as the Irish Free State. It received royal assent on 12 April 1927.

== Background to the act ==
As a result of the Anglo-Irish Treaty, in December 1922 most of Ireland was detached from the United Kingdom of Great Britain and Ireland to become the Irish Free State. However, six north-eastern counties, all within Ulster, remained united with Great Britain as Northern Ireland.

The King's title, proclaimed under the Royal Titles Act 1901 (1 Edw. 7. c. 15), was:

"George V, by the Grace of God, of the United Kingdom of Great Britain and Ireland and of the British Dominions beyond the Seas King, Defender of the Faith, Emperor of India"

At the 1926 Imperial Conference, it was agreed by the Imperial government at Whitehall and those of the various Dominions that the existing royal style and titles of their shared monarch "hardly accorded with the altered state of affairs arising from the establishment of the Irish Free State as a Dominion". The Conference concluded that the wording should be changed to:

"George V, by the Grace of God, of Great Britain, Ireland and the British Dominions beyond the Seas King, Defender of the Faith, Emperor of India"

Under the existing constitutional arrangements of the British Commonwealth, it was necessary for legislation to be enacted by the Parliament of the United Kingdom in order for the royal style and titles to be altered; the resulting Act would then extend automatically into the law of the various Dominions. The British Government introduced the necessary bill into the House of Commons in March 1927 and easily secured its passage through both Houses of Parliament.

== Provisions ==
The act contained three substantive provisions.

Firstly, the King was authorised to issue a royal proclamation within six months of the act's passing, authorising him to alter the royal style and titles. Following the precedent set by similar legislation in the past, the act did not itself set out the form of the new style and titles that were to be adopted.

Secondly, the act formally renamed the parliament sitting at Westminster from "Parliament of the United Kingdom of Great Britain and Ireland" to "Parliament of the United Kingdom of Great Britain and Northern Ireland".

Finally, the act established that the term "United Kingdom", when used in "every Act [of Parliament] passed and public document issued after the passing of this Act", would mean Great Britain and Northern Ireland (unless the context required otherwise).

A royal proclamation was subsequently issued under the terms of the act on 13 May 1927 in the London Gazette. The proclamation followed the recommendation of the Imperial Conference by altering the Latin and English forms of the existing royal style and titles, the former by replacing "Britanniarum" with "Magnae Britanniae, Hiberniae", and the latter by replacing "the United Kingdom of Great Britain and Ireland and of" with "Great Britain, Ireland and".

The Great Seal of the Realm and Great Seal of Scotland were replaced to update the change of royal style. The new designs by Percy Metcalfe were delivered at a Privy Council meeting on 27 October 1930.

== Subsequent developments ==
Over the next quarter of the century the relationship between the various members of the Commonwealth continued to evolve. In particular, the outcome of the 1930 Imperial Conference and the resultant Statute of Westminster 1931 (22 & 23 Geo. 5. c. 4), the formal declaration by the Irish state of its republican status and its consequent secession, as the Republic of Ireland, from the Commonwealth, and the request by India that it remain a member of the Commonwealth despite adopting a republican constitution, all altered both the nature and composition of the Commonwealth.

The royal style and titles were altered in 1948, to reflect the independence of India the previous year by omitting the title "Emperor of India". However, the accession of a new monarch (Elizabeth II) in 1952 was taken as an opportunity to completely alter both the form of the style and titles, and the manner in which they would be legislated for; henceforth, each Commonwealth realm would pass its own legislation establishing its own version of the style and titles. The resulting legislation for the United Kingdom and its dependencies was the Royal Titles Act 1953 (1 & 2 Eliz. 2. c. 9). The reference to "Ireland" in the royal style and title was not changed to "Northern Ireland" until May 1953.

== See also ==
- Style of the British sovereign
- Style and title of the Canadian sovereign
- Royal Style and Titles Act
