= Royal Titles Act 1953 (United Kingdom) =

Act of the Parliament of the United Kingdom

Royal Titles Act 1953 (Note: Section 2.)
- Act of Parliament
- Parliament of the United Kingdom
- Long title: An Act to provide for an alteration of the Royal Style and Titles.
- Citation: 1 & 2 Eliz. 2. c. 9
- Territorial extent: United Kingdom

Dates
- Royal assent: 26 March 1953
- Commencement: 26 March 1953 (Note: The Acts of Parliament (Commencement) Act 1793.)
Other legislation
Relates to	Royal Titles Act 1901; Royal and Parliamentary Titles Act 1927

Status: Current legislation

Text of statute as originally enacted

Revised text of statute as amended

Text of the Royal Titles Act 1953 (United Kingdom) as in force today (including any amendments) within the United Kingdom, from legislation.gov.uk.

The Royal Titles Act 1953 (1 & 2 Eliz. 2. c. 9) is an act of the Parliament of the United Kingdom. It authorizes the monarch to alter their style and titles for the United Kingdom as well as territories whose foreign relations are under the responsibility of His Majesty's Government in the United Kingdom.

A royal proclamation was made under the act on 28 May 1953. It defined the then Queen's titles as:

- in English:

Elizabeth II, by the Grace of God of the United Kingdom of Great Britain and Northern Ireland and of Her other Realms and Territories Queen, Head of the Commonwealth, Defender of the Faith

- in Latin:
  Elizabeth II, Dei Gratia Britanniarum Regnorumque Suorum Ceterorum Regina, Consortionis Populorum Princeps, Fidei Defensor

== See also ==
- Royal Style and Titles Act
