= Royal Style and Titles Act =

Act of parliament defining a monarch's title

A Royal Style and Titles Act, or a Royal Titles Act, is an act of parliament passed in the relevant country that defines the formal title for the sovereign as monarch of that country. This practice began in 1876, when the Parliament of the United Kingdom passed the Royal Titles Act. By that law, and the subsequent Royal Titles Act 1901 and Royal and Parliamentary Titles Act 1927, the monarch held one title throughout the British Empire. Following the enactment of the Statute of Westminster 1931, the governments of the now separate and independent realms sharing one person as sovereign agreed in 1949 that each should adopt its own royal style and title, which was done in 1952. As colonies became new realms, they passed their own royal style and titles acts. Most of the laws were created during the reign of Queen Elizabeth II.

== Background ==
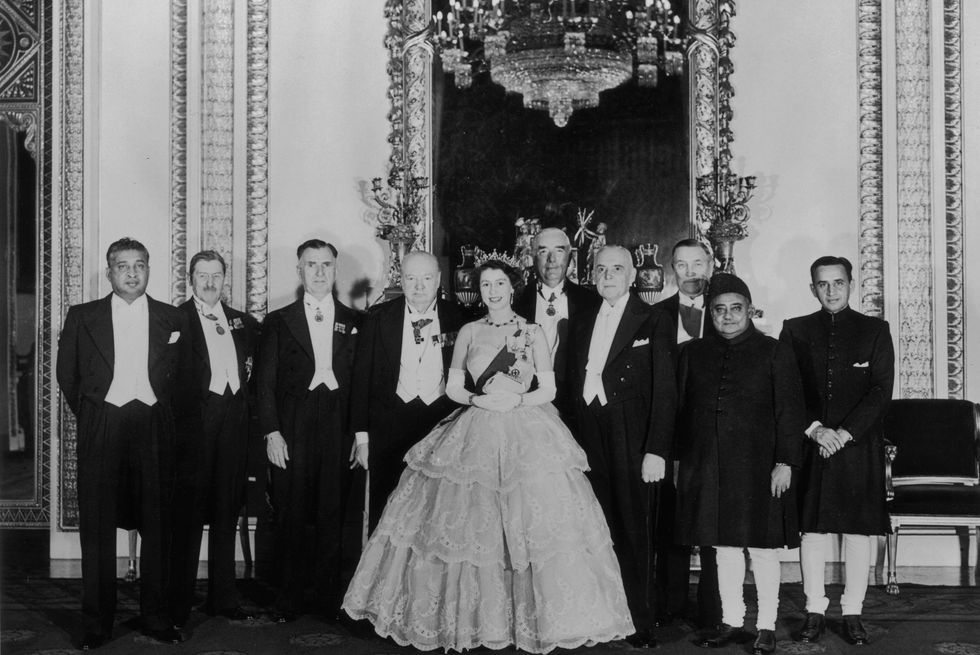
Queen Elizabeth II with the Commonwealth prime ministers during their conference in December 1952

Until the early part of the 20th century, the monarch's title throughout the British Empire was determined exclusively by the Parliament of the United Kingdom. As the Dominions gained importance, the British government began to consult their governments on how the monarch should be titled. By 1926, following the issuance of the Balfour Declaration, it was determined that the changes in the nature of the Empire needed to be reflected in King George V's title. This led to the Royal and Parliamentary Titles Act 1927; though, again, this applied one title to the King across the whole Empire. The preamble to the Statute of Westminster 1931 established the convention requiring the consent of all the Dominions' parliaments, as well as that of the United Kingdom, to any alterations to the monarch's style and title. It had been decided among the realms in 1949 that each should have its own monarchical title, but with common elements. Which elements, however, was not determined after the accession of Elizabeth II as queen in February 1952. The parliament of each then-realm of the Commonwealth passed its own Royal Style and Titles Act before Elizabeth's coronation in June of the following year.

== Antigua and Barbuda ==
The Royal Titles Act, 1981, passed by the Parliament of Antigua and Barbuda, gave that body's assent to the adoption of a title by the monarch of Antigua and Barbuda. After the Governor-General's proclamation dated 11 February 1982, the sovereign's official title was Elizabeth the Second, by the Grace of God, Queen of Antigua and Barbuda and of Her other Realms and Territories, Head of the Commonwealth.

== Australia ==
The Parliament of Australia passed the Royal Style and Titles Act 1953, giving the Australian monarch, then Elizabeth II, the title Elizabeth the Second, by the Grace of God Queen of the United Kingdom, Australia and Her other Realms and Territories, Head of the Commonwealth, Defender of the Faith. This was replaced by the Royal Style and Titles Act 1973 to remove the reference to the United Kingdom and the term defender of the faith.

== Canada ==
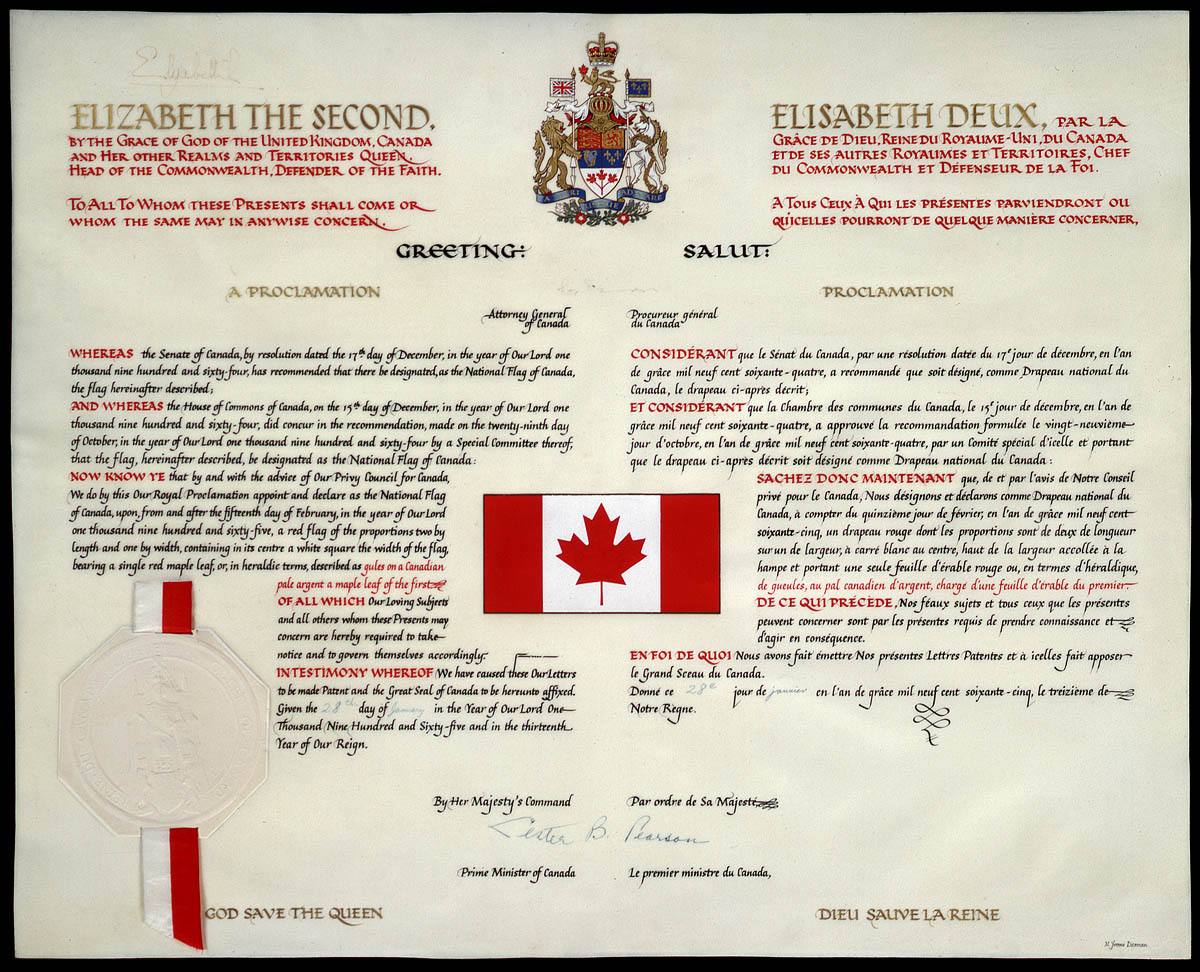
The royal proclamation of the National Flag of Canada showing the title of Elizabeth II of Canada, in English (left) and French (right), at top

The Canadian Parliament passed the Royal Style and Titles Act, 1947 and an order-in-council was issued on 22 June the following year to remove the term Emperor of India from the Canadian sovereign's title. In 1953, the same legislature passed another Royal Style and Titles Act, consenting to the issuance of a royal proclamation changing the royal style and title. This was done on 28 May, declaring the Canadian monarch's title to be, in English, Elizabeth the Second, by the Grace of God of the United Kingdom, Canada, and Her other Realms and Territories, Queen, Head of the Commonwealth, Defender of the Faith, and, in French, Elizabeth Deux, par la grâce de Dieu, Reine du Royaume-Uni, du Canada, et de ses autres royaumes et territoires, Chef du Commonwealth, Défenseur de la Foi.

In April 2023, after the accession of Charles III to the Canadian throne, the Deputy Prime Minister, on behalf of Cabinet, introduced Bill C-47 in the House of Commons. This bill contained provisions that authorized the King to issue a royal proclamation establishing his title for Canada, which excludes a reference to the United Kingdom and the title Defender of the Faith. The bill received royal assent on 22 June 2023 and a proclamation of the new title was issued on 8 January the following year. The new title is, in English, Charles the Third, by the Grace of God King of Canada and His other Realms and Territories, Head of the Commonwealth and, in French, Charles Trois, par la grâce de Dieu, Roi du Canada et de ses autres royaumes et territoires, Chef du Commonwealth.

== Ceylon ==
The Royal Titles Act 1953, passed by the Parliament of Ceylon, granted the Ceylonese monarch the title and style Elizabeth the Second, Queen of Ceylon and of Her other Realms and Territories, Head of the Commonwealth.

== The Gambia ==
The Royal Style and Titles Act 1965, passed by the National Assembly of the Gambia, granted the Gambian monarch the title and style Elizabeth the Second, Queen of The Gambia and all Her other Realms and Territories, Head of the Commonwealth.

== Ghana ==
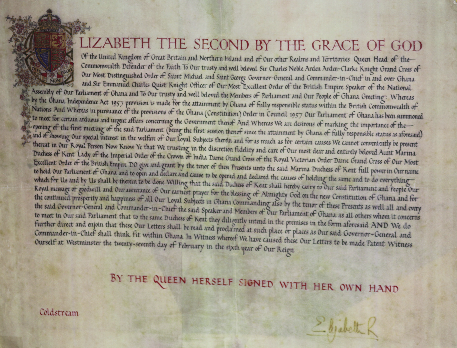
The royal proclamation of Ghana's independence with Queen Elizabeth's British title at top, as the Ghanaian parliament had not yet enacted the Royal Style and Titles Act 1957

The Parliament of Ghana's Royal Style and Titles Act 1957 granted the Ghanaian monarch the title and style Elizabeth the Second, Queen of Ghana and of Her other Realms and Territories, Head of the Commonwealth.

== New Zealand ==
One of the first post-Second World War examples of New Zealand's status as an independent monarchy was the alteration of the monarch's title by the Royal Titles Act 1953. For the first time, the official title of New Zealand's monarch mentioned New Zealand separately from the United Kingdom and the other realms, to highlight the monarch's role specifically as sovereign of New Zealand, as well as the shared aspect of the Crown throughout the realms. The title created from this act was Elizabeth II, by the Grace of God of the United Kingdom, New Zealand and Her Other Realms and Territories Queen, Head of the Commonwealth, Defender of the Faith. After the passage of the Royal Titles Act 1974, the monarch's title in New Zealand was Elizabeth the Second, by the Grace of God Queen of New Zealand and Her Other Realms and Territories, Head of the Commonwealth, Defender of the Faith.

== Nigeria ==
The Royal Style and Titles Act 1961, passed by the Parliament of Nigeria, granted the Nigerian monarch the title and style Elizabeth the Second, Queen of Nigeria and of Her other Realms and Territories, Head of the Commonwealth. An introductory part of the style, By the Grace of God, was nevertheless added in official use.

== Sierra Leone ==
The Sierra Leonean Parliament's Royal Style and Titles Act 1961 granted the Sierra Leonean monarch the title and style Elizabeth the Second, Queen of Sierra Leone and of Her Other Realms and Territories, Head of the Commonwealth.

== Solomon Islands ==
The Royal Style and Titles Act 2013, passed by the National Parliament of Solomon Islands, granted the Solomon Islander monarch the style and title Elizabeth the Second, by the Grace of God, Queen of Solomon Islands and Her other Realms and Territories, Head of the Commonwealth. The title was already in non-statutory use since 1988, when it was included in the Ministry of Foreign Affairs and External Trade Manual.

== South Africa ==
The Royal Style and Titles Act 1953, passed by the Parliament of South Africa, granted the South African monarch—at the time Queen Elizabeth II) a style and title rendered in three languages:

- In English: Elizabeth II, Queen of South Africa and of Her other Realms and Territories, Head of the Commonwealth
- In Afrikaans: Elizabeth II, Koningin van Suid-Afrika en van Haar ander Koninkryke en Gebiede, Hoof van die Statebond
- In Latin: Elizabeth II, Africae Australis regnorumque suorum ceterorum Regina, consortionis populorum Princeps

== Tuvalu ==
The Royal Style and Title Act 1987, passed by the Tuvaluan Parliament, granted the Tuvaluan monarch the style and title Elizabeth the Second, by the Grace of God Queen of Tuvalu and of Her other Realms and Territories, Head of the Commonwealth.

== United Kingdom ==
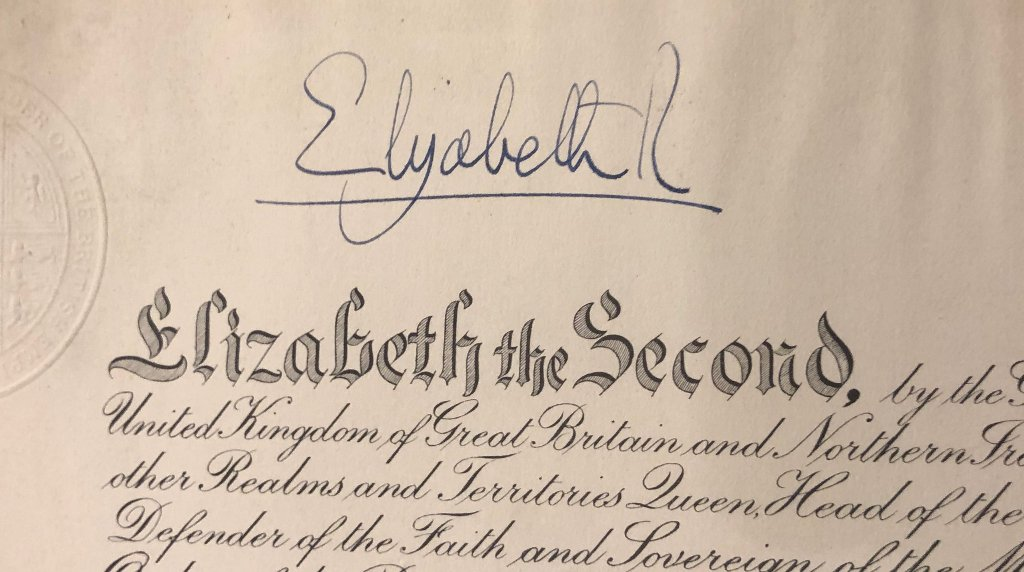
Letters patent bearing the title of Queen Elizabeth II of the United Kingdom below her royal sign-manual

The Royal Titles Act 1901 allowed for the addition of the words and of the British Dominions beyond the Seas to the monarch's title.

The Royal and Parliamentary Titles Act 1927 was amended in 1948 by the Indian Independence Act 1947 so as to omit the words Emperor of India from the monarch's title in the United Kingdom. King George VI's title became George VI by the Grace of God of Great Britain, Ireland and the British Dominions beyond the Seas King, Defender of the Faith.

The Royal Titles Act 1953 specified that it applied only to the United Kingdom and those overseas territories whose foreign relations were controlled by the United Kingdom. The legislation tidied up the use of the title King of Ireland, following Ireland's transition to a republic in 1949.

As authorised by the act, Queen Elizabeth II proclaimed that her title in the United Kingdom would be Elizabeth II, by the Grace of God of the United Kingdom of Great Britain and Northern Ireland and of Her other Realms and Territories Queen, Head of the Commonwealth, Defender of the Faith. The title was equivalently, and, for the first time, set in Latin, as Elizabeth II, Dei Gratia Britanniarum Regnorumque Suorum Ceterorum Regina, Consortionis Populorum Princeps, Fidei Defensor.

== See also ==
- List of titles and honours of Elizabeth II
- List of titles and honours of Charles III
