= Clerk of the Chamber =

- Incumbent; Ceri King LVO since 2016
- Ministry of Justice
- Appointer: The Lord Chancellor
- Inaugural holder: Edward Preston
- Formation: 1884 (Note: Previously, the office was known as Gentleman of the Chamber to the Lord Chancellor.)

The Clerk of the Chamber is a position within the Crown Office, a section of the Ministry of Justice in the United Kingdom. It is nowadays held by the Deputy Clerk of the Crown in Chancery.

== History ==
The office was first established in that of Gentleman of the Chamber to the Lord Chancellor, which was first held by two officers, which were appointed by the Lord Chancellor and retained their posts for the duration of that Lord Chancellor's term.

The office became vested in only one office in 1852. After Corley in 1873, the office gained a permanent character, rather than being removed upon appointment of a new Lord Chancellor.

In 1874, the office of Pursebearer was abolished and its duties transferred to the Gentleman of the Chamber in 1874. This took effect upon the death of William Goodbody, who was the last Pursebearer; upon his death, the duties were transferred to the Clerk of the Chamber, which were those of the Chafewax and Sealer which had previously been vested in the Pursebearer on the abolition of the said offices in 1852.

Since 1884, the office has been known as Clerk of the Chamber, and since 1915, the duties of messenger of the Great Seal, which was formed to replace the post of Messenger and Pursuivant of the Great Seal in 1874. The offices were held in conjunction until 1937, and the post of Messenger of the Greal Seal and Clerk of the Chamber have been associated ever since. The office of Messenger lapsed in 1943.

== Responsibilities ==
The Clerk of the Chamber holds the responsibilities of the former offices of Messenger of the Great Seal and Pursebearer, though those functions have virtually become extinct. The Clerk is now the Deputy Clerk of the Crown in Chancery, and as such holds administrative duties such as assisting the Lord Chancellor in his duties which fall under the authority of the Crown Office, and to act as Registrar of the Peerage and Baronetage.

They are deputised by the Assistant Clerk of the Chamber, who is nowadays the Deputy Head of the Crown Office, and thus Assistant Registrar of the Peerage and Baronetage.

== List of Clerks of the Chamber ==
Clerk of the Chamber
Name (Note: Including honorifics.)	Term of office		Office	Concurrent office(s)	Ref.
Edward Preston	1884	1915	Clerk of the Chamber (Note: Previously served as Gentleman of the Chamber.)	—	
Thomas Hickman	1915	1937	Clerk of the Chamber	Messenger of the Great Seal (Note: Held the office since 1908, until 1937.)	
Leslie C. Ridley	1937	c. 1942	Clerk of the Chamber	Staff Clerk in the Crown Office; Messenger of the Great Seal (Note: The office lapsed in 1943.)	
John Hunt	c. 1942	1970	Clerk of the Chamber	—	
Pat Malley	1970	1984	Clerk of the Chamber	—	
Jennifer Waine	August; 1984	December; 1993	Clerk of the Chamber	—	
Ian Denyer; MVO	December; 1993	2016	Clerk of the Chamber	Head of the Crown Office; Deputy Clerk of the Crown in Chancery; Registrar of the Peerage (Note: Held the office from 2006 to 2016.); Registrar of the Baronetage	
Ceri King; LVO	2016	Incumbent	Clerk of the Chamber	Head of the Crown Office; Deputy Clerk of the Crown in Chancery; Registrar of the Peerage; Registrar of the Baronetage; Deputy Clerk of the Privy Council; Head of Secretariat	
