= Registrar of the Baronetage =

- Incumbent; Ceri King LVO since 2016
- Ministry of Justice
- Appointer: The Lord Chancellor (Note: Previously the Secretary of State for the Home Department.)
- Inaugural holder: Sir William Patrick Bruce
- Formation: 1910
- Deputy: Elaine Chilver (Assistant Registrar of the Baronetage)

The Registrar of the Baronetage is responsible for maintaining and updating the Official Roll of the Baronetage.

== List of Registrars ==
Registrar of the Baronetage
#	Portrait	Name (Birth–Death)	Term of office		Deputy	Concurrent office(s)	Ref.
1		Sir William Patrick Byrne; KCVOCB (died 1935)	1910	1913	Robert Fröding Reynard; ISO	—	
2		Harry Butler Simpson; CB (died 1940)	1913	1925	Robert Fröding Reynard; ISO	—	
2		Harry Butler Simpson; CB (died 1940)	1913	1925	Percy Thomas Shorey; MBE	—	
3		Arthur John Eagleston; CVO (died 1944)	1925	1932	Percy Thomas Shorey; MBE	—	
4		Sir Harry Robert Boyd; KCVOCBE (died 1940)	1932	1940^{[†]}	Percy Thomas Shorey; MBE	—	
4		Sir Harry Robert Boyd; KCVOCBE (died 1940)	1932	1940^{[†]}	Frederick James Dadd; KCVOCBE	—	
—		Frederick James Dadd; KCVOCBE (died 1977)	1940	1945	Frederick James Dadd; KCVOCBE	Assistant Registrar of the Peerage	
5		Sir Henry Austin Strutt; KCVOCB (n/a)	1945	1961	Frederick James Dadd; KCVOCBE	—	
5		Sir Henry Austin Strutt; KCVOCB (n/a)	1945	1961	G. R. Mayhew	—	
5		Sir Henry Austin Strutt; KCVOCB (n/a)	1945	1961	William Edward Kocher	—	
6		Ronald John Gruppy (died 1967)	1661	1967^{[†]}	William Edward Kocher	—	
6		Ronald John Gruppy (died 1967)	1661	1967^{[†]}	M. D. Tenten	—	
7		N. F. Cairncross (died 1969)	1967	1969^{[†]}	M. D. Tenten	—	
7		N. F. Cairncross (died 1969)	1967	1969^{[†]}	E. B. Cable	—	
8		Philip J. Wodfield (died 1970)	1969	1970^{[†]}	E. B. Cable	—	
9		Kenneth P. Witney (died 1976)	1970	1976^{[†]}	E. B. Cable	—	
9		Kenneth P. Witney (died 1976)	1970	1976^{[†]}	R. M. Gaines	—	
9		Kenneth P. Witney (died 1976)	1970	1976^{[†]}	Alan Durrant Bennett; MBE	—	
10		Ralph F. D. Shuffrey (n/a)	1976	1980	Alan Durrant Bennett; MBE	—	
11		Geoffrey de Deney (n/a)	1980	1984	Alan Durrant Bennett; MBE	—	
11		Geoffrey de Deney (n/a)	1980	1984	A. Fitzgerald	—	
11		Geoffrey de Deney (n/a)	1980	1984	Charles J. Goldie	—	
12		Michael Head; CVO (n/a)	1984	1991	Charles J. Goldie	—	
12		Michael Head; CVO (n/a)	1984	1991	Laurence Philip Little	—	
12		Michael Head; CVO (n/a)	1984	1991	Frederick John Perrin	—	
12		Michael Head; CVO (n/a)	1984	1991	Ian William Jardine	—	
13		Robert M. Morris (n/a)	1991	1996	Ian William Jardine	—	
13		Robert M. Morris (n/a)	1991	1996	Frances Geraldine Bright	—	
14		Carolyn Sinclair (n/a)	1996	2001	Frances Geraldine Bright	—	
14		Carolyn Sinclair (n/a)	1996	2001	Sylvia Denise Brown	—	
15		Paul Jenkins (n/a)	2001	2003	Sylvia Denise Brown	—	
15		Paul Jenkins (n/a)	2001	2003	Steven Henry Johnson	—	
16		Andrew McDonald (n/a)	2003	2005	Steven Henry Johnson	Registrar of the Peerage	
17		Ian Denyer; MVO (n/a)	2006	2016	Steven Henry Johnson	Head of the Crown Office; Deputy Clerk of the Crown in Chancery; Registrar of the Peerage; Clerk of the Chamber	
17		Ian Denyer; MVO (n/a)	2006	2016	Grant Ashley Bavister	Head of the Crown Office; Deputy Clerk of the Crown in Chancery; Registrar of the Peerage; Clerk of the Chamber	
18		Ceri King; LVO (n/a)	2016	Incumbent	Elaine Chilver	Head of the Crown Office; Deputy Clerk of the Crown in Chancery; Registrar of the Peerage; Clerk of the Chamber; Deputy Clerk of the Privy Council; Head of Secretariat	

- ^† Died in office.
