= Roll of the Peerage =

Record of peers in the United Kingdom

The Roll of the Peerage is a public record registering peers in the peerages of England, Scotland, Ireland, Great Britain and the United Kingdom. It was created by royal warrant of Queen Elizabeth II dated 1 June 2004, is maintained by the Crown Office within the United Kingdom's Ministry of Justice, and is published by the College of Arms.

== Background ==
On 11 November 1999, the House of Lords Act 1999 received royal assent and took effect, removing the automatic right of hereditary peers to a seat in the House of Lords. Until that date anyone succeeding to a title in the peerages of England, Scotland, Great Britain or the United Kingdom and proving succession received a writ of summons to Parliament. All peers receiving such writs were enrolled in the Register of Lords Spiritual and Temporal, a document maintained by the Clerk of the Parliaments.

The Register of Lords Spiritual and Temporal was not a complete roll of the peerage. Succession to a title in the Peerage of Ireland had never conferred an automatic right to a writ of summons in the United Kingdom Parliament, although from 1801 to 1922 elected representative peers from the Irish peerage did receive writs. A similar system of representation operated for peers of Scotland from 1707 to 1963, when the right to a writ of summons was extended to all peers of Scotland. However, the register was an officially compiled roll recording a large proportion of the hereditary peerages of the United Kingdom and its constituent kingdoms.

Under the House of Lords Act 1999 (as enacted), the only peers receiving writs of summons to Parliament were life peers and 92 representatives of the hereditary peerages of England, Scotland, Great Britain and the United Kingdom. Seventy-five of these representatives were elected by and among the hereditary peers themselves, and fifteen were elected by the whole House from those ready to serve as deputy speakers or in any office that the House required; the remaining two had automatic seats in virtue of their offices of state as Earl Marshal and Lord Great Chamberlain respectively. These 92 and any other hereditary peers who wished to stand in by-elections for the 90 elected representative seats were the only hereditary peers recorded for parliamentary purposes. This fell considerably short of the coverage achieved by the old Register of Lords Spiritual and Temporal, and shorter still of being a full register of hereditary peers.

As of 2026, the only peers receiving writs of summons to Parliament are life peers.

== Royal warrant of 2004 ==
The royal warrant of 1 June 2004 had the express aim of remedying the situation as far as possible, stating in the preamble the desirability of a full record of the peerage. It cited as its model the creation of the Official Roll of the Baronetage, achieved by royal warrant of Edward VII on 8 February 1910, and established an analogous roll for recording peers of all five peerages recognized in the United Kingdom. The warrant was published in the London Gazette on 11 June 2004.

== Maintenance and publication of the roll ==
The warrant imposed the duty of creating and maintaining the roll on the Secretary of State for Constitutional Affairs, acting in consultation with Garter Principal King of Arms and Lord Lyon King of Arms. On the closure of the Department for Constitutional Affairs in 2007 the duty was transferred, along with the other functions of that department, to the Secretary of State for Justice. Maintenance of the roll is carried out by an official in the Crown Office known as the Registrar of the Peerage and assisted by an Assistant Registrar.

From November 2010 the most recent version of the roll has been published in PDF on the website of the College of Arms together with the text of the royal warrant, information on the creation and maintenance of the roll, and copies of guidance notes and forms for those wishing to apply to be entered on it.

In October 2025 King Charles III directed the Secretary of State to remove Andrew Mountbatten-Windsor, then the Duke of York, from the roll in the wake of the public scandal regarding his relationship with Jeffrey Epstein. Although he still legally holds the peerage, it is no longer recognised.

== Method of enrolment ==
Enrolment is automatically consequent upon creation as a peer and can be applied for by way of proving succession to a peerage to the satisfaction of the Lord Chancellor and Secretary of State for Justice. Essential items in proving succession are a formal petition and a statutory declaration made by a person other than the applicant. Guidance notes are produced by the Crown Office to assist with simple proof, as where for instance the applicant is closely related to his or her predecessor. More complex succession, where the relationship is distant, may require specific professional assistance from an officer of arms, a genealogist, and a legal practitioner or the Registrar of the Peerage.

== Effect of enrolment ==
According to the royal warrant any person not entered on the roll shall not be entitled to the precedence of a peer or addressed or referred to as a peer in any official document. However, a peer who is enrolled in a junior title (not having proved a senior title) is nonetheless noted in the roll as 'customarily styled' by the superior title in question, which is then named—even though succession to this title has not been proved. One example of many is Viscount Midleton, who appears as Lord Brodrick on the roll, the title to which he has proved succession, with the statement that he is customarily known as Viscount Midleton and a cross-reference from 'Midleton'.
