= Crown Office in Chancery =

Section of the UK Ministry of Justice

Department overview
- Headquarters: House of Lords London, SW1A 0PW
- Employees: 4
- Minister responsible: Alex Norris, Secretary of State for Justice and Lord Chancellor
- Department executives: Jo Farrar, Permanent Secretary and Clerk of the Crown in Chancery; Ceri King, Deputy Clerk of the Crown in Chancery and Clerk of the Chamber
- Parent department: Ministry of Justice
- Key document: Crown Office Act 1877

The Crown Office in Chancery is a section of the Ministry of Justice (formerly the Lord Chancellor's Department). It has custody of the Great Seal of the Realm, and has certain administrative functions in connection with the courts and the judicial process, as well as functions relating to the electoral process for House of Commons elections, to the keeping of the Roll of the Peerage, and to the preparation of royal documents such as warrants required to pass under the royal sign-manual, fiats, letters patent, etc. In legal documents, "Crown Office" refers to the office of the Clerk of the Crown in Chancery.

The Crown Office employees consist of the Head of the Crown Office, one sealer and two scribes.

== Responsibilities ==
=== Warrants, patents and charters ===
All formal royal documents (such as warrants to be signed by the Monarch; letters patent, both those that are signed by the sovereign and those that are approved by warrant; and royal charters) are prepared by the Crown Office.

The name of the Clerk of the Crown is subscribed/printed at the end of all documents as a way of authentication of their having passed through the Crown Office. This is also done in notices placed by the Crown Office in The Gazette.

=== Great Seal of the Realm ===
The Crown Office is also responsible for sealing with the Great Seal of the Realm all documents that need to pass under that seal, once the authority for the use of the seal is signified by the Sovereign (authorisation to use the seal is granted either by the monarch signing a warrant that approves the draft text of letters patent, directs that they be prepared and authorises them to be sealed and issued, or by the Sovereign directly signing the letters patent that are to pass under the great seal, as is necessary in some cases, such as with letters patent that grant Royal Assent to bills passed by Parliament and with instruments of consent relating to royal marriages).

=== Royal assent ===
The Crown Office is involved in the royal assent process, both when this happens in person by the Lords Commissioners and by notification to both Houses of Parliament. In all cases, the Crown Office prepares a commission for royal assent to bills. When royal assent occurs at the Prorogation of Parliament, the Clerk of the Crown reads out the short titles of acts due to receive royal assent, after which the Clerk of the Parliaments notifies both Houses of royal assent to every Act with the endorsement "Le Roy le veult" if the monarch is male, or "La Reyne le veult", if the monarch is female. When royal assent is given by notification to both Houses, sitting separately, by the Speaker and Lord Speaker, the Crown Office prepares and delivers to the Speaker a certificate notifying them that the sovereign has given royal assent to the acts listed in the certificate, and directing that royal assent be notified by the Speaker, or one of their deputies, in House of Commons Chamber. In the House of Lords, the Crown Office delivers the royal assent commission to the clerks at the table of the House, after which the Lord Speaker, or one of their deputies, notifies the House that royal assent has been given to the acts listed in the royal assent commission.

=== Roll of the peerage, baronetage ===
The Crown Office is responsible for maintaining and updating the Roll of the Peerage. The Secretary of State for Justice is the keeper of the Peerage Roll, and his duties in that regard are daily discharged by a Registrar of the Peerage and a Deputy Registrar, who work within the Crown Office and are therefore under the supervision of the Clerk of the Crown in Chancery, who assumes the position of Registrar of the Peerage. The duties of the Ministry of Justice regarding the keeping and maintenance of the Roll of the Peerage are discharged in collaboration with the Garter King of Arms and Lord Lyon King of Arms, regarding their respective heraldic jurisdictions. The Crown Office also compiles the Official Roll of the Baronetage.

=== House of Commons and elections ===
The Crown Office also has duties relating to the elections for the House of Commons. The Clerk of the Crown in Chancery initiates a parliamentary election in a constituency by sending an election writ to the returning officer of the constituency, and historically received all ballot papers and ballot stubs after the election was complete though they are now kept locally by the registration officer for each area (and retained for a year).

At the first meeting of the House of Commons following a general election, the Clerk of the Crown delivers the Book of Returns to the Clerk of the House of Commons, which contains the list of MPs returned to Parliament. However, this has usually been done by the Deputy Clerk of the Crown, most recently in 2010, 2015 and 2017. The list is also published on the Gazette, on a notice placed by the Crown Office.

== Clerk of the Crown in Chancery ==
The Clerk of the Crown in Chancery, whose office has, since 1885, been held in addition to the position of Permanent Secretary at the Ministry of Justice, is the titular head of the Crown Office, though this distinction is regularly used by the Deputy Clerk; they are appointed by the Monarch under the royal sign-manual.

The Clerk of the Crown also holds the responsibilities of the old office of Secretary of Presentations, which was part of the Lord Chancellor's Department and gave recommendations on the appointment of senior members of the Church of England and other ecclesiastical patronage work. The office was amalgamated into that of the Clerk of the Crown in 1890.

=== Deputy and assistant clerks ===
They are assisted by Deputy Clerks of the Crown in Chancery, which vary between one and two, and deputise in full capacity for the Clerk of the Crown in Chancery when needed. (Note: Ceri King is known to have been Deputy Clerk since at least 27 April 2017, and has, during her tenure, signed as the Head of the Crown Office and Registrar of the Peerage.) (Note: Charles Ian Paul Denyer was known to have been Deputy Clerk since at least 31 December 1997, until 13 October 2019. Upon appointment to the Royal Victorian Order, he was described to be the Clerk of the Chamber and Head of the Crown Office, and later described to be the Deputy Clerk of the Crown in Chancery upon appointment to the Order of the British Empire.) The last instance of this happening was in 2020 (September-December), before the current clerk, Antonia Romeo was appointed, during which time Ceri King, Deputy Clerk, assumed the full position of Clerk of the Crown in Chancery. The office of Assistant Clerk of the Crown in Chancery is also used. (Note: Grant A. Bavister is the last known Assistant Clerk of the Crown in Chancery (also Assistant Head of the Crown Office and Assistant Registrar of the Peerage).)
