= Royal Titles Act 1901 =

Act of the Parliament of the United Kingdom

Royal Titles Act 1901 (Note: Section 2.)
- Act of Parliament
- Parliament of the United Kingdom
- Long title: An Act to enable His most gracious Majesty to make an Addition to the Royal Style and Titles in recognition of His Majesty's dominions beyond the seas.
- Citation: 1 Edw. 7. c. 15
- Territorial extent: United Kingdom

Dates
- Royal assent: 17 August 1901
- Commencement: 17 August 1901 (Note: The Acts of Parliament (Commencement) Act 1793.)
- Repealed: 23 July 1958
Other legislation
Repealed by	Statute Law Revision Act 1958
Relates to	Royal and Parliamentary Titles Act 1927; Royal Titles Act 1953

Status: Repealed

Text of statute as originally enacted

The Royal Titles Act 1901 (1 Edw. 7. c. 15) was an act of the Parliament of the United Kingdom. It authorised the alteration of the British monarch's royal style to reflect the United Kingdom's other colonial possessions.

The royal proclamation made by virtue of the act, issued on 4 November 1901, added the words "and of the British Dominions beyond the Seas" to the royal title in English after "Ireland", and "et terrarum transmarinarum quae in ditione sunt Britannicâ" in Latin.

The addition was removed from the monarch's title by a proclamation made under the Royal Titles Act 1953 (1 & 2 Eliz. 2. c. 9).

== Subsequent developments ==
The whole act was repealed by section 1 of, and the first schedule to, the Statute Law Revision Act 1958 (6 & 7 Eliz. 2. c. 46), which came into force on 23 July 1958.

== See also ==
- Royal Style and Titles Act
