= Royal Titles Act 1876 =

Act of the Parliament of the United Kingdom

Royal Titles Act 1876 (Note: The citation of this act by this short title was authorised by section 1 of, and the first schedule to, the Short Titles Act 1896. Due to the repeal of those provisions it is now authorised by section 19(2) of the Interpretation Act 1978.)
- Act of Parliament
- Parliament of the United Kingdom
- Long title: An Act to enable Her most Gracious majesty to make an addition to the Royal Style and Titles appertaining to the Imperial Crown of the United Kingdom and its Dependencies.
- Citation: 39 & 40 Vict. c. 10
- Introduced by: Benjamin Disraeli (Commons)
- Territorial extent: United Kingdom

Dates
- Royal assent: 27 April 1876
- Commencement: 27 April 1876 (Note: The Acts of Parliament (Commencement) Act 1793.)
- Repealed: 23 July 1958
Other legislation
Repealed by	Statute Law Revision Act 1958

Status: Repealed

Text of statute as originally enacted

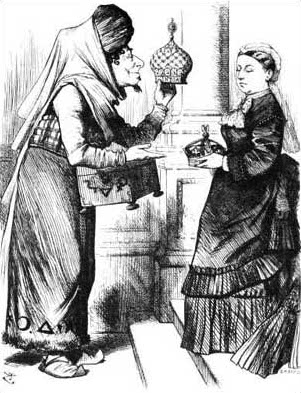
"New crowns for old ones!" An 1876 Punch cartoon of Disraeli, depicted as Abanazer from the pantomime version of Aladdin, offering Victoria the Crown of India in exchange for another.

The Royal Titles Act 1876 (39 & 40 Vict. c. 10), also known as the Imperial Titles Act 1876, was an act of the Parliament of the United Kingdom which officially recognised Queen Victoria (and subsequent monarchs) as "Empress of India".

This title had been assumed by her in 1876, under the encouragement of the Prime Minister Benjamin Disraeli. The long title of the act is "An Act to enable Her most Gracious majesty to make an addition to the Royal Style and Titles appertaining to the Imperial Crown of the United Kingdom and its Dependencies."

== Background ==
Historically, India had been under Company rule of the East India Company. Following the Indian Rebellion of 1857, the British passed the Government of India Act 1858 to take India under direct British control. Queen Victoria had been reigning as Queen at the time. Her daughter Princess Victoria married the heir to the German Empire, Prince Frederick. Queen Victoria was not happy with this due to the fact it would mean that her daughter would outrank her and started talking in 1871 about becoming Empress.

== Passage ==
The Queen formally asked her Prime Minister, Benjamin Disraeli to enact legislation to make her Empress. Though it was initially considered that the Queen's title was part of her Royal prerogative, it was pointed out that precedent of the Act of Union 1800, which united the Kingdoms of Great Britain and Ireland, meant that parliamentary legislation was needed. The Royal Titles Bill faced opposition in Parliament from the Leader of the Opposition, William Gladstone and his Liberal Party. Gladstone felt that to call the Queen an Empress was despotic and un-British. One MP said that it would offend the other Crown Colonies within the British Empire whilst another felt that it would be insulting to the Princely states of India.

Disraeli had the Queen's permission to decide on where she would be Empress of. It was decided that she would only be Empress of India and the Royal sign-manual would only say "Victoria Regina et Imperatrix" (Latin: Victoria Queen and Empress) for India, whereas she would use her existing title for the United Kingdom. With the support of Disraeli's Conservative Party, the bill passed and Queen Victoria was formally proclaimed as Empress of India at the Delhi Durbar in 1877. Queen Victoria started a fascination with India from then on.

== Subsequent developments ==
Despite King George VI formally dropping the title of Emperor following Indian independence in 1948, The Act would initially remain in force. The whole act was repealed by section 1 of, and the first schedule to, the Statute Law Revision Act 1958 (6 & 7 Eliz. 2. c. 46), which came into force on 23 July 1958.
