= Peerages in the United Kingdom =

Noble titles in the United Kingdom

A peerage is a form of crown distinction, with peerages in the United Kingdom comprising both hereditary and lifetime titled appointments of various ranks, which form both a constituent part of the legislative process and the British honours system within the framework of the Constitution of the United Kingdom.

The term peerage can be used both collectively, to refer to this entire body of titled nobility (or a subdivision thereof), and individually, to refer to a specific title (modern English language-style using an initial capital in the latter case but not the former). British peerage title holders are termed peers of the Realm. Lord is used as a generic term to denote members of the peerage; however, individuals who use the appellation Lord or Lady are not always necessarily peers (for example, some judicial, ecclesiastic and others are often accorded the appellation Lord or Lady as a form of courtesy title as a product of their office).

The peerage also forms the highest rung of the British nobility. This is a formal designation and not to be confused with the British upper class which is by contrast not formally structured, though many of the former may compose part of the latter. Though the modern UK is a constitutional monarchy with robust democratic elements, historically the British Isles were predisposed towards monarchial and aristocratic governance in which power was largely inherited and shared amongst a privileged monarchy and aristocracy and their families and retainers, with the later British nobility and class system having evolved out of this period.

The British monarch is considered the fount of honour and is notionally the only person who can grant peerages, though there are many conventions about how this power is used, especially at the request of the British government.

The peerage's fundamental roles today are ones of lawmaking and governance, with a peer being eligible (although formerly entitled) to a seat in the House of Lords and having eligibility to serve in a ministerial role in the government if invited to do so by the monarch or, more conventionally in the modern era, by the prime minister.

Until the creation of the Supreme Court of the United Kingdom in 2009, the peerage also formed a constituent part of the British judicial system, via the Appellate Committee of the House of Lords.

The peerage also has a ceremonial aspect and serves a role as a system of honour or award, with the granting of a peerage title forming the highest rung of the modern British honours system. All peers continue to hold formal rankings in the United Kingdom orders of precedence.

Within the United Kingdom, due to the hereditary nature of most peerage titles historically, five peerage divisions currently co-exist, namely:

- The Peerage of England – titles created by the kings and queens of England before the Acts of Union in 1707
- The Peerage of Scotland – titles created by the kings and queens of Scotland before 1707
- The Peerage of Great Britain – titles created for the Kingdom of Great Britain between 1707 and 1801
- The Peerage of Ireland – titles created for the Kingdom of Ireland before the Acts of Union in 1801, and some titles created later
- The Peerage of the United Kingdom – most titles created since 1801

== Background ==
=== Creation ===
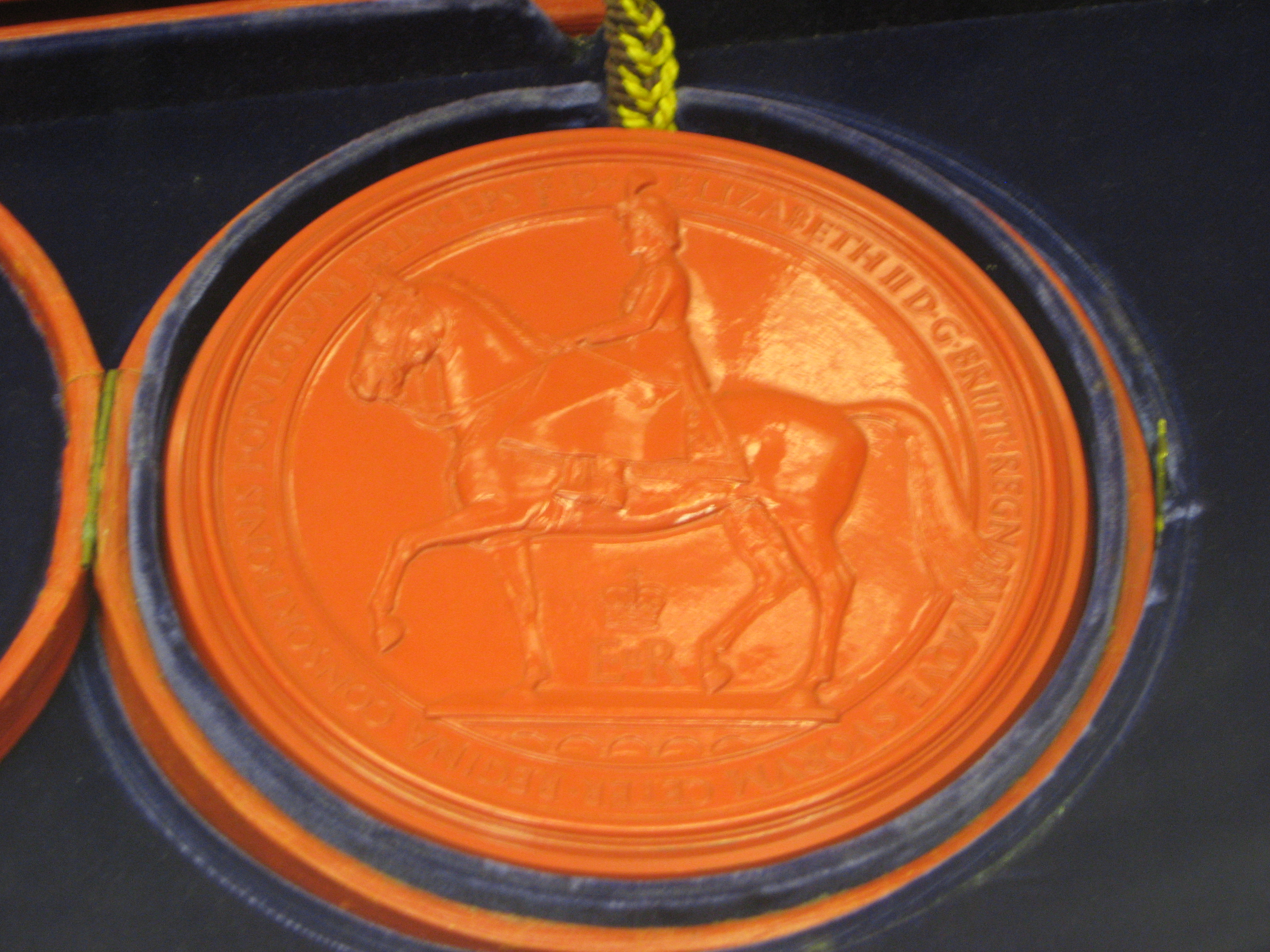
Wax impression of a Great Seal of the Realm (that used 1953–2001), which is affixed to all letters patent creating new peerages

All peerages are created by the British monarch. The monarch, as the fount of honour, cannot hold a British peerage themselves. However, the monarch, in addition to their title of 'King' or 'Queen', whether male or female, is informally accorded the style of 'Duke of Lancaster' (a title linked to the historic Duchy of Lancaster, which became the private estate of the British sovereign when the holder, Henry IV of England, ascended the throne in 1399). Likewise in the Channel Islands and Isle of Man (which are not parts of the United Kingdom, but possessions of the British Crown) the informal titles Duke of Normandy (a title associated with William the Conqueror prior to his ascension to the throne in 1066) and Lord of Mann (the title acquired with the Crown purchase of the Isle of Man under George III in 1765) are used respectively.

All British subjects who were neither royal nor peers of the realm were previously termed commoners, regardless of ancestry, wealth or other social factors. Thus, all members of a peer's family, with the exception of their wife or unremarried widow, are (technically) commoners too; the British system therefore differs fundamentally from continental European versions, where entire families, rather than individuals, were ennobled. This idea that status as a 'commoner' is based on title rather than bloodline correspondingly means, for example, that Princess Anne, who enjoys royal status as the daughter of Queen Elizabeth II, opted for her children (Peter Phillips and Zara Tindall) to be technically commoners (though functionally part of the untitled nobility) despite their being grandchildren of the then sovereign, when Anne and her husband, Mark Philips, declined the offer of peerage titles. Where children of peers use titles these are accorded by courtesy, as they do not hold peerages themselves. For example, the Duke of Norfolk holds other peerage titles, including the Earl of Arundel and Baron Maltravers. A hypothetical eldest son of the Duke of Norfolk can therefore be styled by courtesy as "Earl of Arundel" ("the" does not precede it, as this would indicate a substantive title). In this example, only the Duke of Norfolk is actually a peer; his son is not.

=== Division and rank ===
Most peerages since 1801, and all subsequent peerages from 1898, are created within the division of the Peerage of the United Kingdom. Hereditary peerages are still extant in the other divisions: the Peerage of England, the Peerage of Scotland, the Peerage of Great Britain and the Peerage of Ireland.

Since 2009 almost all life peerages are created, by convention, at the rank of baron, the sole exception being the royal life peerage of the Dukedom of Edinburgh in 2023. The reason for this is that the Life Peerages Act 1958 restricts the issuing of writs of summons to life peers (entitling the peer to sit in the House of Lords) to those created at the rank of baron only. While peerages remain part of the honours system, the main reason for creating new peers is for them to hold a seat in the House of Lords. A government could theoretically support the creation of a life peerage at a more senior rank as an honour for someone who displayed particularly meritorious service, who did not want to enter parliament, but so far no government has done so. Life peerages at higher ranks have been created historically, such as the Duke of Ireland and Countess of Yarmouth.

=== Entitlement and heritability ===
All honours, including peerages, are granted at the discretion of the monarch as the fount of honour (though functionally and mostly on the advice of the government); there is, therefore, no entitlement to be granted a peerage. However, historic precedent means some individuals are granted peerages by convention. For example, since the Wars of the Three Kingdoms it has been convention for a retiring speaker of the House of Commons to be granted a hereditary viscountcy; however, the last to receive the honour was in 1983, and the convention is now accepted to have changed to a life peerage at the rank of baron instead. British prime ministers are also offered a peerage by convention when leaving office. This was previously a hereditary peerage at the rank of Earl. However, the last prime minister to accept this honour was Harold Macmillan in 1984, and the convention is now accepted to have changed to a life peerage at the rank of baron. When Margaret Thatcher resigned in 1990, as the first female prime minister, she was not offered the conventional peerage, but instead a baronetcy (a hereditary knighthood and not a peerage) was granted to her husband Denis Thatcher allowing her to be styled as Lady Thatcher by courtesy (at present this is also the last non-royal hereditary titled honour of any variety created in the UK). This decision drew controversy at the time, and Thatcher was later given a life peerage in her own right in 1992. The most recent prime minister to receive a peerage was Theresa May, who was given a life peerage in 2024.

Most peerage nominations are 'political peers' or 'working peers', nominated by the prime minister of the governing party, or by other party leaders to 'top up' each of the party groups' strengths and on the expectation that they will attend parliament regularly and take on frontbench work. However, since 2001 any member of the public can make a nomination to the House of Lords Appointment Commission, to nominate someone to sit with the "cross bench" peers, as a non-party political peerage—sometimes called 'people's peers'. As of 2023, since 2001 67 'people's peers' have been appointed.

Historically monarchs sold peerage titles under limited circumstances. This was often done to raise funds. For example, in the early Stuart period, King James I sold peerages, adding sixty-two peers to a body that had included just fifty-nine members at the commencement of his reign. Some governments through history also sold peerages to fund government activities, or more controversially, party activities. The selling of peerages by a government was made illegal in 1925 with the Honours (Prevention of Abuses) Act 1925. The act was the result of the administration of David Lloyd George selling a high number of controversial peerages. The Blair administration was later accused of trying to skirt this law in 2006 in the so called "Cash-for-Honours scandal", as was an aide of Prince Charles in the 2021 Cash-for-Favours scandal. Unlike the feudal titles they replaced, peerages are not a form of property and cannot be transferred, bought, or sold by the title holder.

The exact terms of the peerage are set out in the letters patent. All peerages are strictly personal and for life. However, historic peerages are often heritable, primarily by agnatic primogeniture with some exceptions of male-preference cognatic primogeniture. For most of their history, hereditary peerages were the norm. Today, the only new hereditary peerages granted are, by convention, to members of the royal family. The last non-royal awardees of hereditary titles were in the Thatcher era. Since then, ruling parties have instead exclusively created life peers and refrained from recommending any others to be elevated to a hereditary peerage, although this is simply present convention and there is nothing preventing future governments from doing so.

When a peerage is inherited, the holder is by convention numbered sequentially according to the order of succession from the original grantee. For example, the son of the first recipient of the peerage title 'Duke of Somerset', upon inheriting the title, would become 'the 2nd Duke of Somerset' indicating they are the second holder of that title and not the original recipient who was honoured. The counting starts afresh for each creation. This is the case even if a peer is attained of their title, and their would be heir is granted the same title in a new creation.

=== Confirmation process ===
The government of the United Kingdom makes recommendations to the sovereign concerning who should be elevated to the peerage, after external vetting by the House of Lords Appointments Commission for those peers who will be sitting in the House of Lords (which is now by convention almost all new creations, with the exception of royal peerages).

It is unclear in the present day whether the monarch would move to directly block a recommendation or a conventional ascension to the peerage, though they are constitutionally entitled to do so. It was reported in 2023 that members of the British security services had contacted Queen Elizabeth II to request she intervene and block the peerage of Evgeny Lebedev who had been nominated by then Prime Minister Boris Johnson. Some media outlets have reported personal interventions with other honours: For example, former prime ministers are also by convention knighted, being raised to the Order of the Garter or the Order of the Thistle. However it was alleged in 2020 that due to a personal reluctance by Queen Elizabeth II to award the Garter to Tony Blair other living prime ministers would not be raised either. Tony Blair was later knighted by Queen Elizabeth II as a Knight Companion of the Garter in 2022.

Like all Crown honours, peerages are affirmed by letters patent affixed with the Great Seal of the Realm. In addition to letters patent, peers who are to sit in Parliament are issued writs of summons. The writ of summons calls the member to the House. A new writ is issued for every member at the beginning of each Parliament (after a general election). A writ accompanies the letters patent for new members. The honour will also be recorded in The London Gazette.

Honours, including peerages, are usually awarded at new year and on the monarch's official birthday. They can also be awarded as part of a Prime Minister's resignation, or upon the dissolution of a Parliament. Monarchs may also make new peers upon their coronation, jubilee or upon the demise of the previous monarch. There are also ad hoc announcements and "Special Honours", issued at any time throughout the year at the pleasure of the monarch. This might be done to allow someone to serve in cabinet, or as an immediate reward for exemplary service.

Recipients of new peerages are typically announced via the Crown Honours Lists. Formerly, new peers were presented with an investiture ceremony, but this has not taken place since 1621 (investiture ceremonies for other honours are mostly managed by the Central Chancery of the Orders of Knighthood). New peers serving in parliament do receive an introduction ceremony at the House of Lords.

All peerages are recorded on the Roll of the Peerage maintained by the Crown Office within the United Kingdom's Ministry of Justice, and published by the College of Arms. The Secretary of State for Justice in their role as Lord Chancellor is the keeper of the Peerage Roll, and their duties in that regard are daily discharged by a Registrar of the Peerage and a Deputy Registrar, who work within the Crown Office under the supervision of the Clerk of the Crown in Chancery. Succession claims to existing hereditary peerages are regulated by the House of Lords Committee for Privileges and Conduct and administered by the Crown Office.

=== Declining, disclaiming, and revocation ===
Peerages can be declined by prospective recipients, and often have been throughout history for various different reasons. For instance, Winston Churchill declined the Dukedom of London so he could continue to sit in the House of Commons.

Since the House of Lords Reform Act 2014, peers may resign from the House of Lords, whilst keeping their title and style.

Though there is no mechanism for life peers to fully disclaim their peerage, hereditary peers may fully disclaim their peerage for their lifetime under the Peerage Act 1963. The peerage remains extant until the death of the peer who had made the disclaimer, when it descends to their heir in the usual manner.

The Crown does not have the power to cancel or revoke a peerage once it has been created. A peerage can only be removed from an individual by an act of parliament, an example of such being the Titles Deprivation Act 1917.

== Constitutional functions ==
=== Legislative function ===
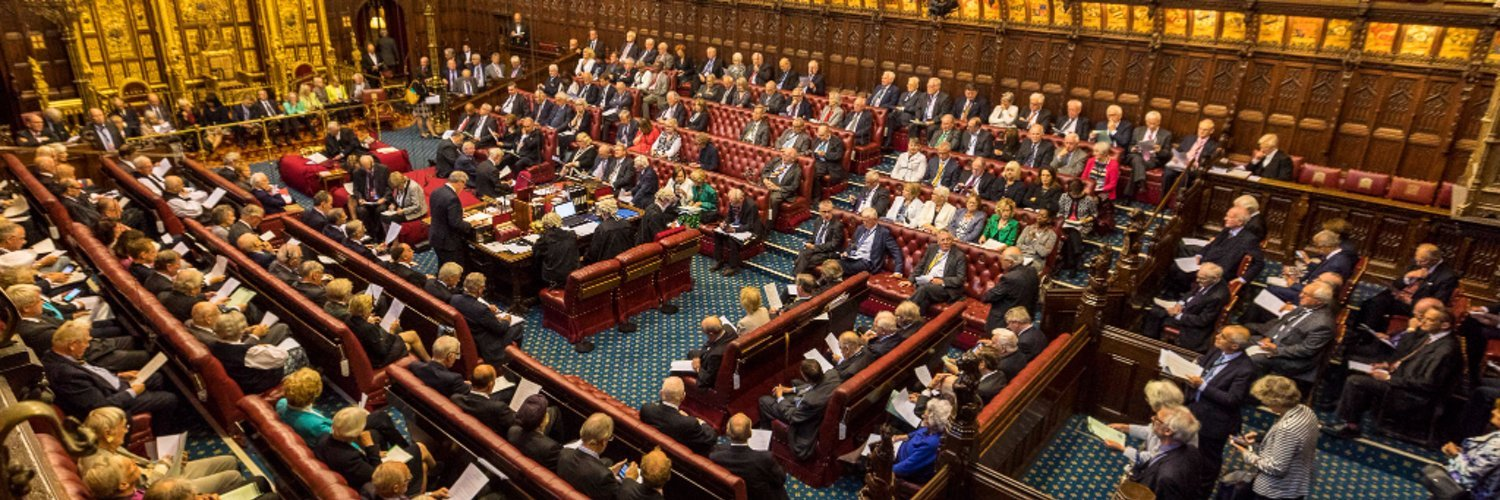
The House of Lords showing government, opposition and the cross benches

Any peer who receives a writ of summons (which is in practice all life peers except retired peers) may sit in the House of Lords as the Lords Temporal. They sit alongside the Lords Spiritual, who do not hold peerages, but are bishops of the Church of England. Labour, elected to power in 1997, sought to remove all of the seats in the House of Lords reserved for hereditary peers via the House of Lords Act 1999, but then Prime Minister Tony Blair relented by allowing 92 members to remain, allegedly to ensure the passage of the act. 90 of these hereditary peers are elected to the House of Lords from within their own populace, while the other two sit ex officio holding the hereditary constitutional offices of Earl Marshal and the Lord Great Chamberlain. However, following the implementation of the House of Lords (Hereditary Peers) Act 2026 under Prime Minister Sir Kier Starmer's government, no recipient of a hereditary peerage will sit in the House of Lords by virtue of their hereditary peerage alone. The Earl Marshal and Lord Great Chamberlain are granted parliamentary passes enabling them to execute their constitutional functions, but are no longer ex officio members of the House of Lords.

Since the Parliament Act 1911 and Parliament Act 1949 the House of Lords' purpose is now that of a revising legislative chamber, scrutinising and potentially changing proposed Parliamentary Bills before their enactment. Its membership for the most part comprises life peers, created under the Life Peerages Act 1958, which includes those who can add value in specific areas of expertise in parliamentary debates, as well as former MPs and other political appointees from respective political parties. Those who do not sit with a political party, may sit in the house as a so called Crossbencher. Prior to July 2006 the Lord Chancellor—one of the Great Officers of State and government minister—served as the presiding officer of the peers in the House of Lords. Were a person not a peer to be appointed to the office of Lord Chancellor, they would traditionally be raised to the peerage upon appointment, though a scarcely used provision was made in 1539 for appointees who are great officers of state but not peers to sit in between the benches in the House, meaning commoners could execute the role without the need for elevation to the peerage. Since 2006 however, in an effort to separate powers, the role of presiding officer has been fulfilled by the Lord Speaker of the House of Lords elected by the peers from amongst their own number. The Lord Chancellor retained their role as a government minister however, and in June 2007 Jack Straw was the first commoner to be appointed as Lord Chancellor since 1587.

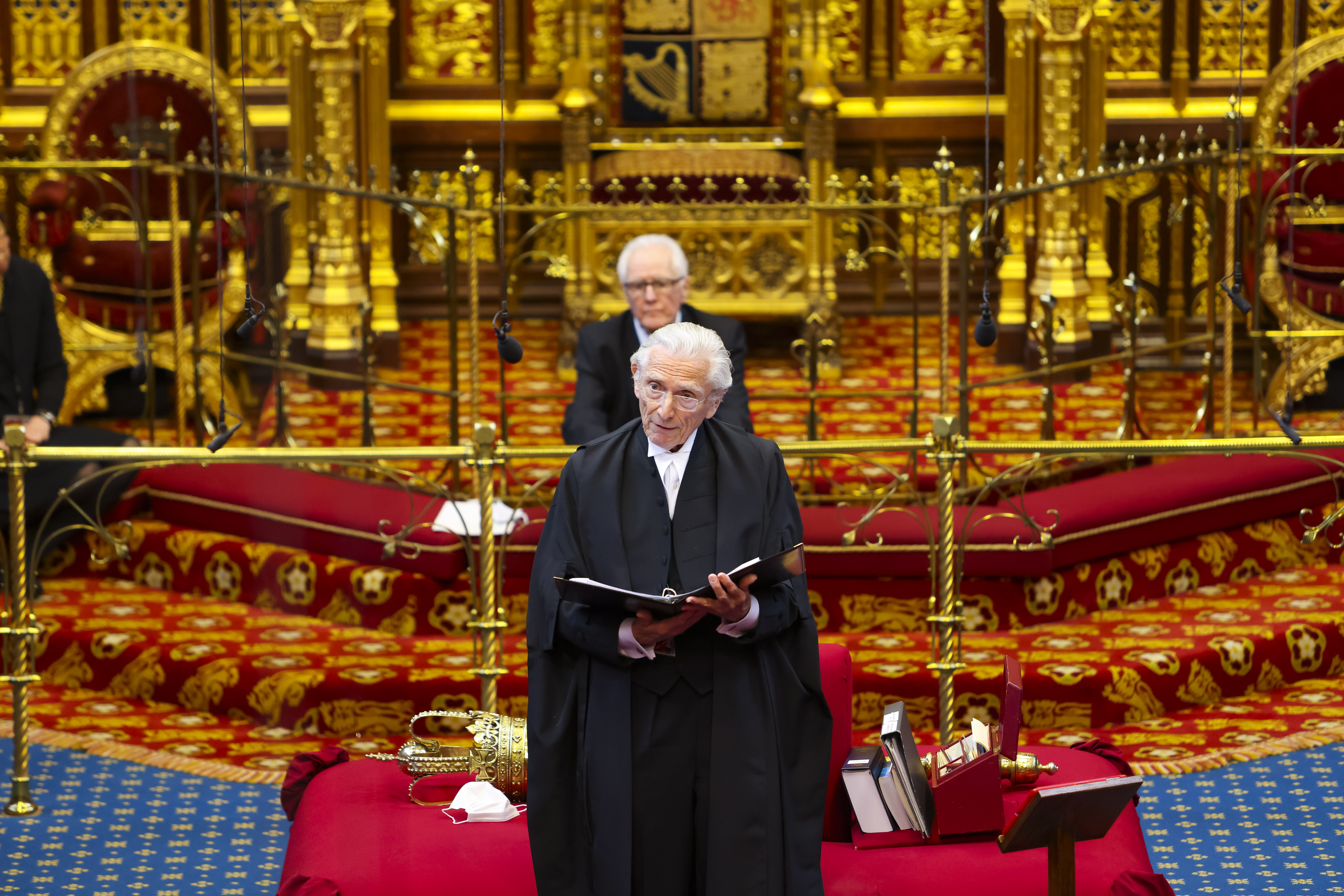
The Lord Speaker presiding from the woolsack

In the upper chamber, in contrast to the House of Commons, where proceedings are controlled by the speaker, proceedings of the Lords are controlled by peers themselves, under the rules set out in the Standing Orders. The Leader of the House of Lords has the responsibility of reminding the House of these rules and facilitating the Lords' self-regulation, though any member may draw attention to breaches of order or failure to observe customs. The Leader is often called upon to advise on procedures and points of order. However, neither the Lord Speaker nor the Leader of the House has the power to rule on points of order or to intervene during an inappropriate speech.

Parties within the House of Lords have whips, however cross-bench peers elect from among themselves a Cross-bench Convenor for administrative purposes, and to keep them up to date with the business of the House.

=== Executive function ===
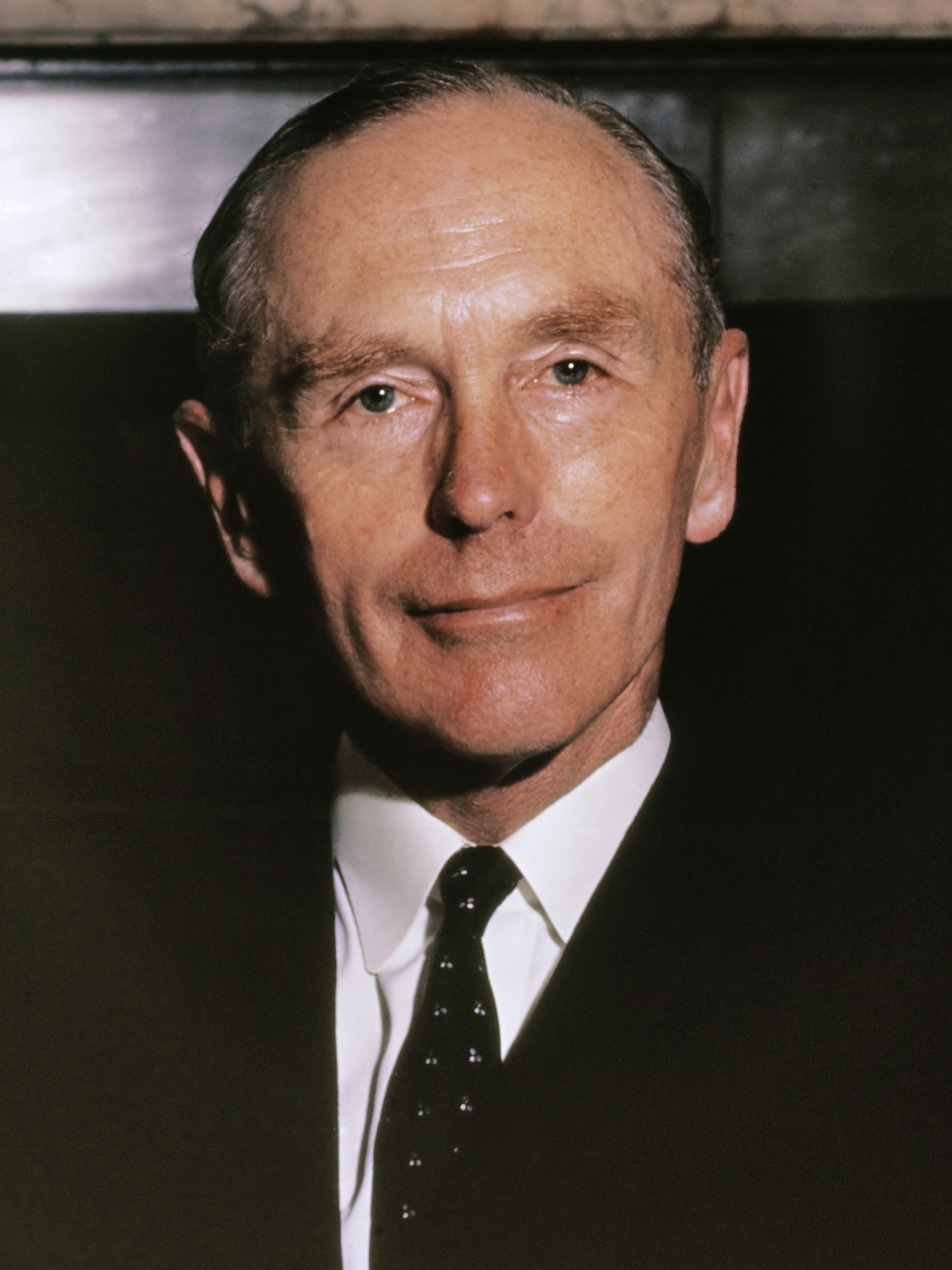
Alec Douglas-Home (c.1963), the last Prime Minister of the United Kingdom to serve from the House of Lords

Peers in the House of Lords can serve in the British government, when invited to do so, as ministers including within the Great Offices of State (for example David Cameron who served as Foreign Secretary in the Premiership of Rishi Sunak). The only consistent role for a peer in the cabinet is that of Leader of the House of Lords, who must be a member of the House of Lords by nature of the appointment.

Historically the Lord Chancellor was by convention a peer, and a member of the cabinet (in addition to serving a judicial and legislative role). The ministerial department of the lord chancellor was known as the Lord Chancellor's Office between 1885 and 1971, and the Lord Chancellor's Department between 1971 and 2003. In 2003 the department was renamed the Department for Constitutional Affairs, and the lord chancellor was appointed Secretary of State for Constitutional Affairs. In 2007 the department became the Ministry of Justice and in June 2007 Jack Straw was the first commoner to be appointed as Lord Chancellor since 1587.

Peers can even serve as prime minister, though this is no longer convention, and the last to do so was Alec Douglas-Home in 1963, who disclaimed his peerage within a few days of being appointed as prime minister to fight a by-election to sit in the Commons.

Peers in the House of Lords are often appointed by the sovereign, on the advice of the government, to serve as a Privy Counsellor. The Privy Council is a formal body of advisers to the monarch, on matters such as the issuing of royal charters. Peers can serve as Lords Commissioners when appointed (privy councillors appointed by the monarch of the United Kingdom to exercise, on their behalf, certain functions relating to Parliament which would otherwise require the monarch's attendance at the Palace of Westminster).

In theory all peers, life and hereditary, are also prospective members of the Magnum Concilium regardless of whether they sit in the House of Lords. This is a council summoned for nobles to discuss the affairs of the country with the monarch; however, it has not been convened since 1640, though nothing prevents it from being assembled in the future.

Peers can also be appointed as Lords-in-waiting where they may be called upon periodically to represent the sovereign; for example, one of their number is regularly called upon to greet visiting heads of state on arrival at the start of a state visit.

Prior to the Regency Act of 1937, peers serving as Lord Chancellor, or in other senior political roles, could also be delegated royal functions to serve as Counsellors of State; however, this is now reserved to the monarch's spouse and the members of the Royal Family in the immediate line of succession.

=== Judicial function ===
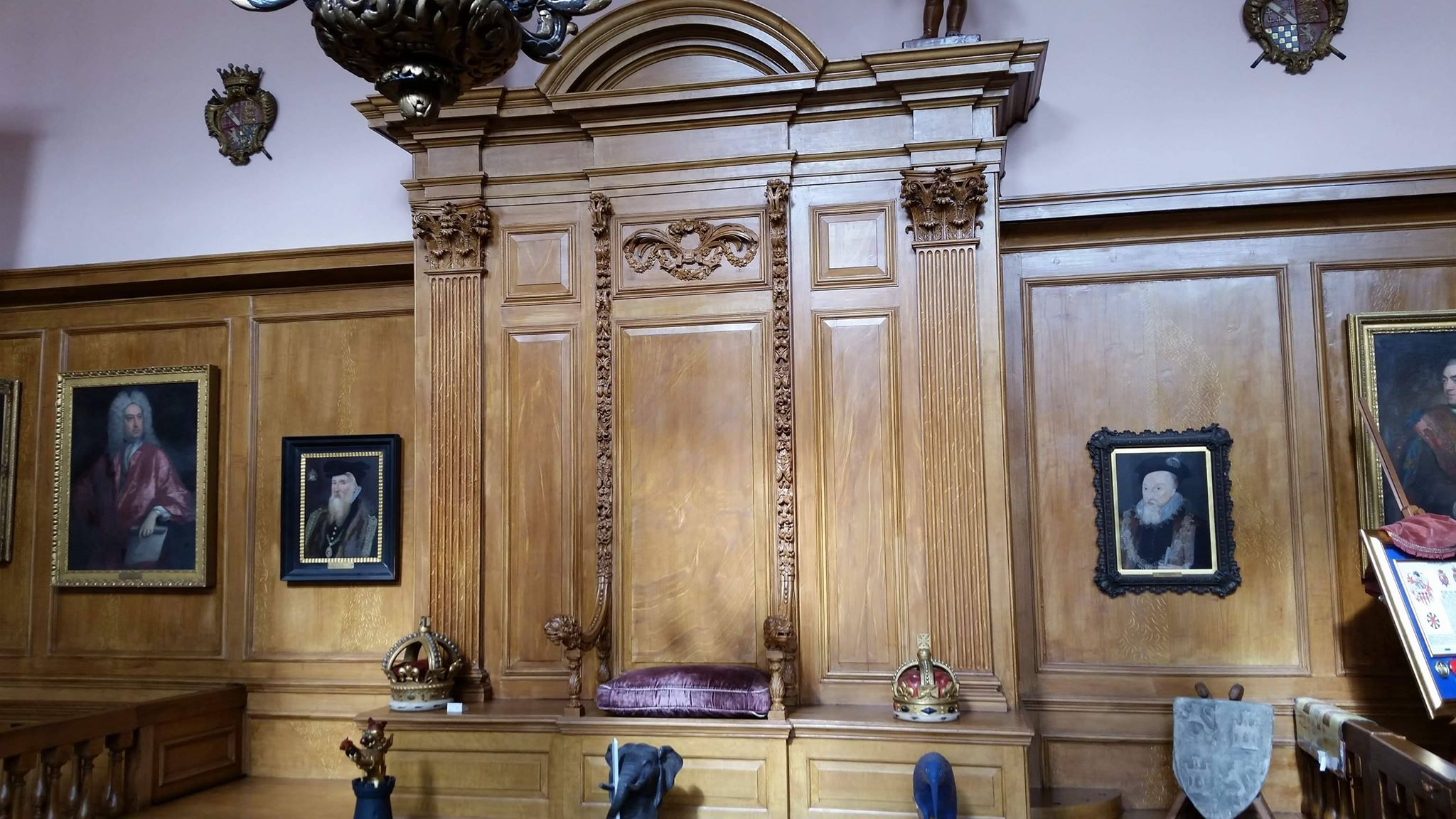
Courtroom of the Earl Marshall, Court of Chivalry, College of Arms, London

Until 2009 the Appellate Committee of the House of Lords served as the highest appellate court within the United Kingdom's legal system. The Appellate Jurisdiction Act 1876 allowed for the appointment of Lords of Appeal in Ordinary—judges meeting specific criteria made peers for life—who formed the main body of the committee. On 1 October 2009, the Appellate Jurisdiction Act 1876 was repealed, owing to the creation of the Supreme Court of the United Kingdom. The House of Lords thus lost its judicial functions. At the time of creation, the 12 Lords of Appeal in Ordinary (the Law Lords) became the first wave of justices to the Supreme Court but were simultaneously disqualified from sitting or voting in the House of Lords until they retired from the court. Judges appointed to the new Supreme Court are not automatically made peers, but those who have not previously been independently granted a peerage, are entitled to use a judicial courtesy title of "Lord" or "Lady", with a territorial designation, for their remainder of their lives. In addition to serving as Presiding Officer of the Peers in the Lords, the Lord Chancellor also served as the head of the English and Welsh judiciary and a de facto 'Justice Minister'. The judicial function of the Lord Chancellor was removed with the Constitutional Reform Act 2005, and the Lord Chief Justice of England and Wales became the new head of the judiciary, while the former Lord Chancellor's ministry/Department for Constitutional Affairs was merged into the newly created Ministry of Justice in May 2007. Since then all Lord Chancellors have also held the office of Minister of Justice (in much the same way all First Lords of the Treasury hold the office of Prime Minister). In 2012 Chris Grayling would be the first non-lawyer to serve as Lord Chancellor for at least 440 years. As the Head of the judiciary in England and Wales, the Lord Chancellor also served as a member of the Judicial Committee of the Privy Council; however, the last lord chancellor to preside as a judge of this court was Lord Irvine of Lairg (in office 1997–2003). This function was also removed from the Lord Chancellor following the Constitutional Reform Act 2005.

The Earl Marshal is the only peer in England and Wales to retain a judicial function by right of office, as the sole judge of the High Court of Chivalry a civil law court with jurisdiction over matters of heraldry in England and Wales, though if not a professional lawyer, he normally appoints a professional lawyer as his lieutenant or surrogate. In Scotland the Duke of Hamilton is a hereditary assessor at the Court of the Lord Lyon, a standing court of law which regulates heraldry in Scotland.

=== Ceremonial function ===
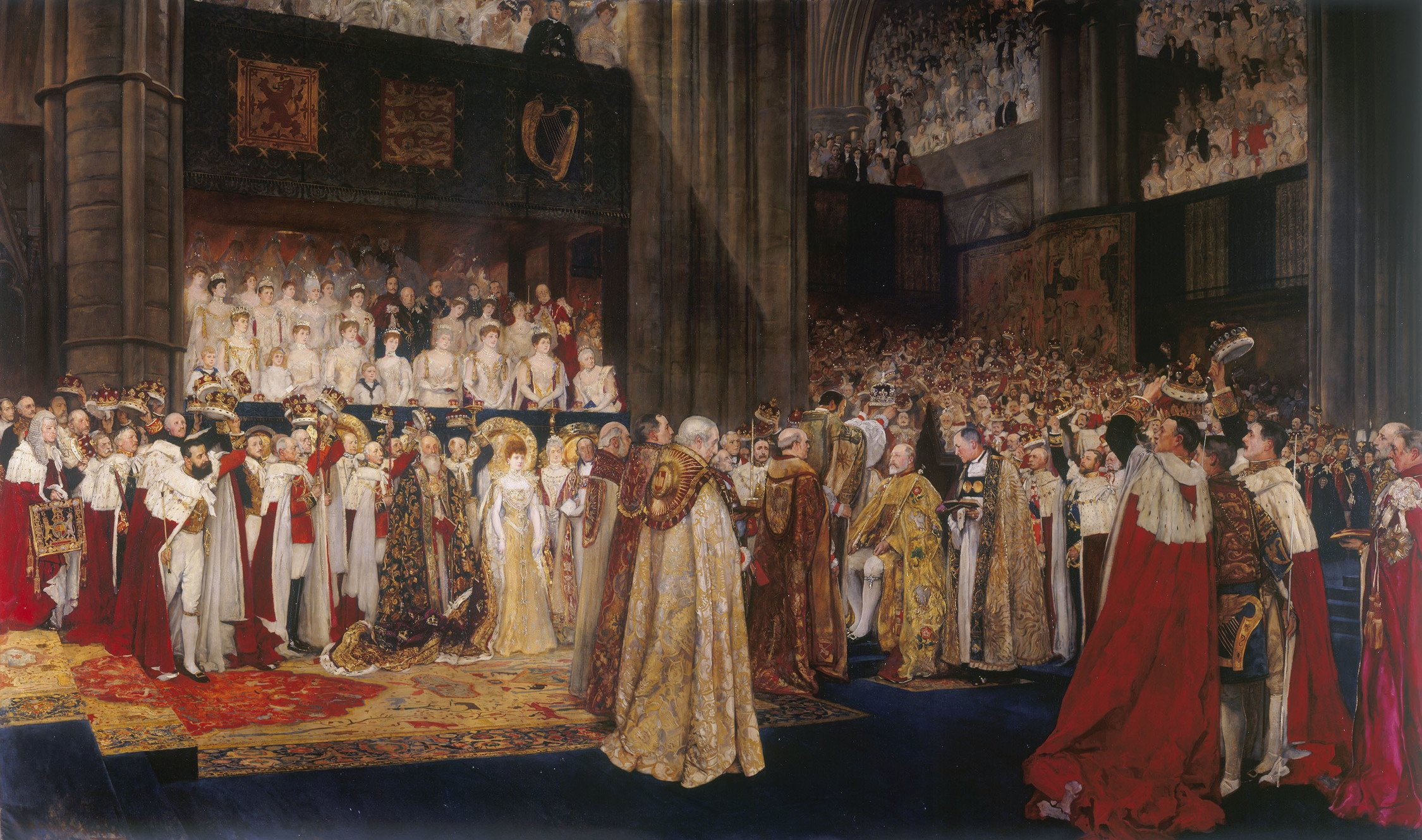
The Coronation of King Edward VII—The moment depicted is when the Archbishop of Canterbury, with arms lifted is about to place the Imperial Crown on the head of Edward VII, who is seated, clothed in robes of State, in the Coronation chair. Princes and peers in coronation robes raise their coronets and lead the shout "God Save the King".

All peers hold a formal ranking in the United Kingdom orders of precedence.

The Lord Great Chamberlain is entrusted by the Sovereign with custody of the Palace of Westminster, the seat of the British Parliament, and serves as their representative therein. They have jurisdiction within all areas of the palace excluding the House of Lords and House of Commons directly. The position is a hereditary one, held since 1780 in gross between three families descending from the 3rd Duke of Ancaster and Kesteven. Under an agreement made in 1912, the right to exercise the office for a given reign rotates among the three families (of the then three joint office holders) in proportion to the fraction of the office held. At any one time, no single person actually exercises the office of Lord Great Chamberlain. The various individuals who hold fractions of the office are properly each Joint Hereditary Lord Great Chamberlain. Their modern role is to serve as a de facto director of ceremonies for the Palace of Westminster. Though the House of Lords Act 1999 removed the automatic right of hereditary peers to sit in the House of Lords, the Act provided that a hereditary peer exercising the office of Lord Great Chamberlain be exempt from such a rule, in order to perform ceremonial functions. They help to organise the State Opening of Parliament and direct Black Rod to summon members of the House of Commons to attend the House of Lords for the speech from the throne.

The Lord Great Chamberlain and the Earl Marshal each have a role in the Coronation of the British monarch. Other invited peers also have a role in the coronation. Peers wear coronation robes and coronets during a specific part of the ceremony. However in 2023 peers were asked not to wear their coronets for the coronation of Charles III.

Peers who are also Privy Councillors form part of the Accession Council upon the death of a monarch to make formal proclamation of the accession of the successor to the throne.

Within the Royal Households of the United Kingdom certain roles, such as Lord Steward and Lord Chamberlain, are by convention held by peers (since the 18th century), or in the case of Women of the Bedchamber (sometimes called ladies-in-waiting) the daughters of peers. Certain roles are informally attached hereditarily to certain peerages: for example, the Lord High Constable of Scotland is hereditarily held by the Earl of Erroll.

== Within the honours system ==
The peerage forms part of the British honours system, as the highest tier. This role dates back to the days when being ennobled by the monarch meant secure addition for someone and their heirs into the British aristocracy, and alongside it, political power and a theoretically raised status within the hierarchy of the British class system.

These days as most peerages are for life and not hereditary, addition for one's heirs into the 'titled' British nobility is no longer guaranteed with the granting of a peerage. Instead the granting of a peerage forms part of the honour system because it brings with it an honorific, title and style for life as a reward in overt recognition of the recipient's contributions to society, or some segment thereof.

This is in contrast to those who inherit hereditary peerages, which are not inherited in recognition of the merits of the heir to the title, but according to the rules laid out in the original letters patent. The 'honour' is in recognition of the actions of the initial grantee, remembered through their heirs. The UK now has a presumption against the creation of new hereditary peerages, on the understanding that honours should be reserved for the meritorious service of individuals. This has in turn led to calls from some segments of British government and society to change the inheritance rules for existing hereditary peerages, and in some instances for the abolition/revocation of existing hereditary peerages altogether.

Although life peerages do not guarantee the entry of one's heirs into the 'titled' British nobility, the legitimate children of life peers appointed under the Life Peerages Act 1958 are entitled to style themselves with the prefix "The Honourable". Peers are also entitled to apply for a coat of arms, from the heraldic authorities of the United Kingdom. A coat of arms can be inherited, with armigers forming part of the 'untitled' British nobility according to some sources.

As noted above, despite forming part of the honours system, nominations for peerages do not come from an Honours Committee but from the sovereign directly (though functionally on the advice of their government).

Given the political powers that come with a peerage title, some commentators have suggested the peerage should be separated from the Honours system. In 2016 Baron Lloyd-Webber for example wrote "I was put in as an honour, not as a working peer. Not as lobby fodder. I'm fed-up with the fact that I keep being asked now to go in and vote for things about which I don't have knowledge." Since the House of Lords Reform Act 2014, peers may resign from the House of Lords, and thereby surrender their legislative power, whilst keeping their title and style.

== Privileges ==
The privilege of peerage is the body of privileges that belongs to peers, their wives and their unremarried widows. The privilege is distinct from parliamentary privilege, and applies to all peers, not just members of the House of Lords. It still exists, although "occasions of its exercise have now diminished into obscurity."

Although the extent of the privilege has been ill-defined, three features survived to the 20th century: the right to be tried by fellow peers in the Lord High Steward's Court and in the House of Lords (abolished in 1948); the personal right of access to the sovereign at any time, but this privilege has long been obsolete; and the right to be exempt from civil arrest (a privilege that has been used only twice since 1945). All privileges of a peerage are lost if a peer disclaims their peerage under the Peerage Act 1963.

=== Judicial privilege ===
Under the privilege of peerage, peers themselves had the right to be tried for impeachment, felonies or for high treason by other peers in the House of Lords (instead of commoners on juries). In such cases a Lord High Steward would be appointed to preside over the trial—functionally this was usually done by temporarily elevating the Lord Chancellor to this role. Henry Dundas, 1st Viscount Melville was the last person to be tried in the House of Lords on impeachment in 1806. In December 1935 Douglas Hogg, 1st Viscount Hailsham was elevated from Lord Chancellor to Lord High Steward to preside over the last ever trial of a peer 'by his peers', with the trial of the 26th Baron de Clifford in the House of Lords for manslaughter. The right to be tried by other peers in the House of Lords was abolished at the request of the Lords in 1948 by Criminal Justice Act 1948.

=== Salary, remuneration and land ===
There is no automatic right to a salary for being a peer; this includes peers who serve in parliament, who (unlike MPs in the House of Commons) do not receive a salary for their role. However, peers who serve in the House of Lords are entitled to claim £342 allowance for each day they attend to help cover expenses. In an effort to ensure peers from outside the capital were not disadvantaged, peers whose registered home address is outside Greater London can also claim travel expenses and up to £100 towards the cost of a hotel or similar accommodation. Peers who serve in government as ministers are not entitled to claim these allowances, however, and thus their roles are often jointly given with sinecure roles, or they are appointed to salaried positions in the Royal Household. For example, the position of Leader of the House of Lords is usually appointed with the accompanying sinecure role of Lord Privy Seal, as the latter carries a salary. The Government Chief Whip in the House of Lords is appointed jointly to the role of Captain of the Honourable Corps of Gentlemen at Arms, and the Government deputy chief whip is appointed jointly as Captain of the Yeomen of the Guard. This allows them to take a salary from the Royal Household as heads of the Sovereign's Bodyguard. The salaries of the Leader of the Opposition and Opposition Chief Whip in the House of Lords are paid out of public funds alongside the so called Cranborne Money, the annual payment to opposition parties in the House of Lords to help them with their costs.

Though a small minority of peerages have associated hereditary royal offices—for example the office of Earl Marshal has been consistently and hereditarily held by the dukes of Norfolk since 1672—peerages do not automatically grant the holders royal offices or privileges. The feudal titles (such as Lordship of the Manor titles) that peerages largely replaced often have associated royal offices because they were held via Grand serjeanty, e.g. the Lord of the Manor of Scrivelsby in Lincolnshire holds the office of King's Champion.

Peerages do not automatically grant specific land rights or privileges (unlike the feudal titles they largely replaced) and the territorial designation of a peerage title does not indicate any land ownership nor entitle the holder to any benefit from the territory or land named. For example, the Marquess of Salisbury owns the mineral rights below Welwyn Garden City, not because of the peerage, but because he also owns the separate historic feudal title "Lord of the Manor of Hatfield" which granted these rights. The very limited historical exceptions to this are the County palatinate of Chester belonging to the Earl of Chester, which held some limited privileges until 1830, and the Duchy of Cornwall conferred on the Duke of Cornwall. Both of these titles are royal peerages traditionally held by the heir to the throne. The Duchy of Lancaster also exists, but is not associated with a peerage title, but rather the courtesy title of Duke of Lancaster held by the monarch. Today the Duchies remain "Crown bodies", regulated by Acts of Parliament, that have some of the powers of a corporation or trust. The administration of the Duchy of Lancaster is handled on behalf of the monarch by the Chancellor of the Duchy of Lancaster, a position in the Cabinet of the United Kingdom, while the Duchy of Cornwall is administered for the Duke of Cornwall by the Lord Warden of the Stannaries. There were also palatine districts in Ireland, of which the most notable were those of the Earls of Desmond and the Earls of Ormond in County Tipperary in the Peerage of Ireland. The latter continued in existence until it was abolished by the County Palatine of Tipperary Act 1715. In Scotland, the earldom of Strathearn was identified as a county palatine in the 14th century, although the title of Earl of Strathearn has usually been merged with the Crown in subsequent centuries and there is little indication that the status of Strathearn differed in practice from other Scottish earldoms.

Though peerages, particularly hereditary peerages, are associated with country houses set within large estates, there is no explicit formal link between the two, and many hereditary peers are now separated from the country estates their ancestors owned, while many life peers have never owned such estates. Through history, some peers inherited manor houses from the feudal era, while others built new prodigy houses, or later purchased country estates with wealth made in the empire or industry. Some country houses were gifted to peers "by the nation", such as Blenheim Palace for the 1st Duke of Marlborough and Trafalgar Park for the 1st Earl Nelson. Historically, some hereditary peers used an entail in an effort to prevent their estate from being separated from the peerage titles by their heirs and reinforcing the practice of primogeniture. The entail practice was essentially abolished by the early half of the 20th century, and many peers and members of the landed gentry had to sell their estates due to political and economic changes.

=== Access ===
Peers retain a theoretical right to an audience with the monarch at any time, though this privilege has long been obsolete. Peers who have served in the House of Lords (including those retired) have dining rights in the House of Lords dining halls, which also permit them to bring up to six guests. Peers may also use the Chapel of St Mary Undercroft at the Palace of Westminster for weddings and christenings for themselves and their families at the discretion of Black Rod.

=== Official and heraldic privileges ===
Certain specific personal privileges are afforded to many peers and peeresses. For example, the Duke of Atholl in Scotland is permitted the only legal private army in Europe, the Atholl Highlanders; a privilege granted by Queen Victoria. Also in Scotland, currently four peers are permitted to appoint private officers of arms recognised by the court of the Lord Lyon (though this is principally in their capacity as Clan Chiefs, an office nominally separate from their peerage).

There are a number of heraldic privileges which are either exclusive, or almost exclusive, to peers such as the granting of supporters and certain helmets.

=== Social privileges ===
There are formal and social clubs organised exclusively for peers, such as the House of Lords Yacht Club. Until 2015 peers in the House of Lords could join the parliamentary rifle club which was located in a rifle range in the basement of the House of Lords.

Though not a formally recognised privilege, peers have often historically made up a significant percentage of Lord Lieutenancy appointments. These are the Monarch's representatives in a county. Though there has been greater diversity in recent years, a number of these appointments are still held by peers. Again, while not a formal privilege, peers are also frequently included on guest lists for Royal Garden Parties, Royal Weddings, and Royal Funerals. Peers also make up a significant number of appointments to the Orders of the Garter and Thistle as well as senior tiers of the Royal Victorian Order, all of which are appointed solely at the Sovereign's discretion. Peers often make up other high society social appointments; for example His Majesty's Representative at Ascot is a post usually held by a peer.

The main formal social distinction of a peerage nowadays, apart from access to the House of Lords for life peers and some hereditary peers, is the title and style thereby accorded.

== History of the peerage ==
=== Baronage evolution ===
The modern-day parliamentary peerage is a successor of the medieval baronage system which emerged in the English feudal era. Feudalism was introduced to England after 1066 by William the Conqueror and taken to Scotland by David I in 1124 when, after having lived in England as Earl of Huntingdon, he succeeded to the Scottish throne.

A barony was a form of feudal landholding, where individuals were appointed by the king, as his tenants-in-chief—that is to say people who held land by feudal tenure directly from the king as their sole overlord and were granted by him a legal jurisdiction (court baron) over said territory. The nation had been divided into many "manors", the owners of the manors came to be known as barons; those who held many manors were known as "greater barons", while those with fewer manors were the "lesser barons". Certain other office-holders such as senior clerics and Freemen of the Cinque Ports were also deemed "Barons". The baronage was the collectively inclusive term denoting all members of the feudal nobility. As the baronage were 'overlords' the term 'Lord' came to be used as an appellation.

Under the old system of feudalism, some Lords had the authority to effectively create titles of their own (through powers like Subinfeudation), such as the Barony of Halton which was created by the Earl of Chester, or the Irish hereditary Knight of Kerry which was created by the Earl of Desmond. Through acts like the Quia Emptores of 1290 these powers were stripped back, and the authority to create titles was entrenched as exclusive to the monarch.

=== Early parliament ===
The modern peerage system is a vestige of the custom of English kings in the 12th and 13th centuries to grant a right to barons to attend parliament; in the late 14th century, this right (or "title") began to be granted by decree, and titles also became inherited with the rest of a manorial estate under the system of primogeniture.

The requirement to attend Parliament was both a liability and a privilege for those who held land as a tenant-in-chief from the king per baroniam: that is to say, under the feudal contract wherein a king's baron was responsible for raising knights and troops for the royal military service.

When kings summoned their barons to Royal Councils, the greater barons were summoned individually by the sovereign, lesser barons through sheriffs, a local judicial office from the Anglo-Saxon era meaning 'shire-reeve' formerly selected from the thane class.

In England in 1254, the lesser barons ceased to be summoned, and this right, entitlement or "title" to attend parliament began to be granted by decree in the form of a writ of summons from 1265. This body of greater barons evolved into the House of Lords. Magna Carta, first issued in 1215, declared that "No free man shall be seized, imprisoned, dispossessed, outlawed, exiled or ruined in any way, nor in any way proceeded against, except by the lawful judgement of his peers", and thus this body of greater Barons were deemed to be "peers" of one another, and it became the norm to refer to these magnates as a "peerage" during the reign of Edward II.

Meanwhile the holders of smaller fiefdoms per baroniam ceased to be summoned to parliament; thus the official political importance of ownership of manors declined, resulting in baronial status becoming a personal title rather than one linked to ownership of territory.

Eventually 'writs of summons' ceased to be issued, and Letters patent were used to create new lordships: new lords were summoned to parliament by Letters patent from 1388. The first baron to be created by patent was Lord Beauchamp of Holt in the reign of Richard II.

Feudal baronies had always been hereditable by primogeniture, but on condition of payment of a fine, termed "relief", derived from the Latin verb levo, to lift up, meaning a "re-elevation" to a former position of honour. By the beginning of the 14th century, the hereditary nature of the peerage was well developed. Since the Crown was itself a hereditary dignity, it seemed natural for seats in the upper House of Parliament to be so as well. Baronies and other titles of nobility became unconditionally hereditable on the abolition of feudal tenure by the Tenures Abolition Act 1660.

=== Transition from feudalism ===
Thus over time baronies by writ effectively became hereditary peerages, even if this had not been the intention of the original issuer of the writ. By the Tenures Abolition Act 1660, many remaining baronies by tenure who did not have an established inherited writ of summons were converted into baronies by writ, thereby bringing them into line with the other peerages.

While non-heritable "peerages for life" were often created in the early days of the peerage, their regular creation was not provided for by Act of Parliament until the Appellate Jurisdiction Act 1876 and in 1958 more generally.

The rank of earl dates to Anglo-Saxon times. The ranks of duke and marquess were introduced in the 14th century, and that of viscount in the 15th century.

== Ranks ==
Peers are of five ranks, in descending order of hierarchy:

- Duke comes from the Latin dux, meaning 'leader' (typically of an army). The first duke in a peerage of the British Isles was created in 1337. The feminine form is Duchess.
- Marquess comes from the French marquis, which is a derivative of marche or march. This is a reference to the borders ('marches') between England, Scotland, and Wales, a relationship more evident in the feminine form, Marchioness. The first marquess in a peerage of the British Isles was created in 1385. These replace a feudal concept known as a "Marcher lord".
- Earl comes from the Old English or Anglo-Saxon eorl, meaning a man of noble birth or rank. The meaning may have been affected by the Old Norse jarl, meaning a free-born warrior or nobleman, during the Danelaw, thus giving rise to the modern sense. Since there was no feminine Old English or Old Norse equivalent for the term, 'Countess' is used (as Earls are analogous to the Continental 'Counts'), from the Latin comes ('companion'). The rank was created c. 800–1000. In the Peerage of Scotland the title of Mormaer evolved into the Earldom in the 13th century as Scots gradually replaced Scottish Gaelic as the dominant vernacular language.
- Viscount comes from the Latin vicecomes, meaning 'vice-count'—or below a count (indicating its ranking as below Earls who are themselves equivalent to a continental Count). The rank was created in 1440. The feminine form is Viscountess.
- Baron comes from the Old Germanic baro, meaning 'freeman'. The rank was created in 1066. In England this was initially a feudal title introduced by the Normans that was gradually merged into the peerage. In the Peerage of Scotland alone, a holder of the fifth rank is not called a 'Baron' but rather a 'Lord of Parliament'. As in England Barons in Scotland were traditionally holders of feudal dignities, however, the Scottish didn't adopt the practice of Barons as a peerage title until the Acts of Union 1707 and the introduction of the Peerage of Great Britain. In addition to extant Lords of Parliament in the Peerage of Scotland, many Scottish Baronies still exist but are not part of the peerage system. The feminine form of Baron is Baroness.

Baronets, while holders of hereditary titles, are not peers, although socially they are regarded as part of the aristocracy.

Lords of the manor are also not peers, but are instead a remnant of the English feudal system. They have historically been associated with the English landed gentry and squirearchy within the context of the class structure of the United Kingdom and many peers may also be Lords of the Manor. The status of lord of the manor is today often associated with the rank of esquire by prescription. Likewise, in Scotland "Lairds" are not part of the peerage system, but a courtesy title applied to an owner of a large, long-established Scottish estate affording recognition of a territorial designation as a part of their name by the Lord Lyon.

Knights, dames and holders of other British non-hereditary chivalric orders, decorations, and medals are likewise not peers; nor are the hereditary knights of Ireland (only three such titles were ever created).

== Types of peers ==
=== Hereditary peers ===
A hereditary peer is a peer of the realm whose dignity may be inherited; those able to inherit it are said to be "in remainder". Hereditary peerage dignities may be created with writs of summons or by letters patent; the former method is now obsolete. Writs of summons summon an individual to Parliament, in the old feudal tradition, and merely implied the existence or creation of a hereditary peerage dignity, which is automatically inherited, presumably according to the traditional medieval rules (male-preference primogeniture, like the succession of the British crown until 2011). Letters patent explicitly create a dignity and specify its course of inheritance (usually agnatic succession, like the Salic Law). Some hereditary titles can pass through and vest in female heirs in a system called coparcenary. Following the Succession to the Crown Act 2013, which replaced male-preference primogeniture with absolute primogeniture in the line of succession to the throne, there were calls from some hereditary peers' daughters to change the rules for hereditary peerages to match. In 2018, five daughters of hereditary peers took the government to the European Court of Human Rights to challenge the laws that stop them from inheriting their fathers titles and thereby being elected to the House of Lords, but their challenge was denied admission.

Once created, a peerage dignity continues to exist as long as there are surviving legitimate descendants (or legitimate agnatic descendants) of the first holder, unless a contrary method of descent is specified in the letters patent. Once the heirs of the original peer die out, the peerage dignity becomes extinct. In former times, peerage dignities were often forfeit by Acts of Parliament, usually when peers were found guilty of treason. Often, however, the felonious peer's descendants successfully petitioned the sovereign to restore the dignity to the family. Some dignities, such as the Dukedom of Norfolk, have been forfeit and restored several times. Under the Peerage Act 1963 an individual can disclaim his peerage dignity for his own lifetime within one year of inheriting it.

When the holder of a peerage succeeds to the throne, the dignity "merges in the Crown" and ceases to exist.

All hereditary peers in the Peerages of England, Scotland, Great Britain, and the United Kingdom were entitled to sit in the House of Lords, subject only to qualifications such as age and citizenship, but under section 1 of the House of Lords Act 1999 they lost this right. The Act provided that 92 hereditary peers—the Lord Great Chamberlain and the Earl Marshal, along with 90 others exempted through standing orders of the House—would remain in the House of Lords in the interim, pending any reform of the membership to the House. This reform was completed under the House of Lords (Hereditary Peers) Act 2026, which removed the right of all excepted hereditary peers to sit in the house. Of the 92 excepted hereditary peers, 26 were restored to the House of Lords as life peers shortly after their removal, 3 were granted life peerages shortly before the passage of the act, and 5 already sat in the house by virtue of a life peerage,

=== Representative peers ===
From 1707 until 1963, Scottish peers elected 16 Scottish representative peers to sit in the House of Lords. Since 1963, they have had the same rights as Peers of the United Kingdom. From 1801 until 1922, Irish peers elected 28 Irish representative peers to sit in the House of Lords. Since 1922, when the Irish Free State became a separate country, no Irish representative peers have been elected, though sitting members retained their seats for life.

=== Life peers ===
Apart from hereditary peerages, there exist peerages that may be held for life and whose title cannot be passed onto someone else by inheritance. The Appellate Jurisdiction Act 1876 and the Life Peerages Act 1958 authorise the regular creation of life peerages, with the right to sit in the House of Lords. Life peers created under both acts are of baronial rank and are always created under letters patent.

Since the loss of the right of hereditary peers to sit in the House of Lords as a result of the House of Lords Act 1999, the majority of the House of Lords is made up of life peers. There is no limit on the number of peerages the sovereign may create under the Life Peerages Act. Normally life peerages are granted to individuals nominated by political parties or by the House of Lords Appointments Commission, and in order to honour retiring politicians, current senior judges, and senior members of the armed forces.

Until the formal opening of the Supreme Court of the United Kingdom on 1 October 2009, life peers created under the Appellate Jurisdiction Act were known as "Lords of Appeal in Ordinary" or in common parlance "Law Lords". They performed the judicial functions of the House of Lords and served on the Judicial Committee of the Privy Council. They remained peers for life, but ceased to receive judicial salaries at the age of 75. Under the terms of the Act, there may be no more than 12 Lords of Appeal in Ordinary under the age of 75 at one time. However, after the transfer of the judicial functions of the Lords to the Supreme Court of the United Kingdom, the Act ceased to have meaningful effect.

Under the House of Lords Reform Act 2014 and the House of Lords (Expulsion and Suspension) Act 2015 a life peer may lose membership of the House of Lords permanently in one of four ways:

- Resignation or retirement effected by writing to the Clerk of the Parliaments;
- Automatic expulsion through failing to attend a single sitting of the House throughout a whole session of more than six months' duration without leave of absence, being suspended for that session or being exempted by the House for special circumstances;
- Automatic expulsion through conviction of a criminal offence where the punishment is imprisonment for more than one year;
- Expulsion by resolution of the House.

While these provide for non-membership of the House of Lords, they do not allow a life peer to disclaim their peerage in the same way that a hereditary peer can disclaim theirs.

== Form of title ==
The titles of peers are in the form of "(Rank) (TitleName)" or "(Rank) of (TitleName)". The name of the title can either be a place name or a surname or a combination of both (e.g. The Duke of Norfolk or The Earl Spencer). The precise usage depends on the rank of the peerage and on certain other general considerations. For instance, Dukes always use "of". Marquesses and Earls whose titles are based on place names normally use "of" (e.g. The Marquess of Bute and The Marquess of Ailsa), while those whose titles are based on surnames normally do not (e.g. The Marquess Curzon of Kedleston and The Earl Alexander of Tunis). Viscounts, Barons and Lords of Parliament generally do not use "of". However, there are several exceptions to the rule. For instance, Scottish vicecomital titles theoretically include "of", though in practice it is usually dropped (e.g. "The Viscount of Falkland" is commonly known as the "Viscount Falkland".)

=== Multiple, compound and other names ===
While surnames and place names have been commonly used for peerage titles, it is also possible to create other forms of title. For instance, existing double-barrelled surnames have been used for titles (e.g. The Baroness Burdett-Coutts and The Baroness Spencer-Churchill) and other double-barrelled surnames have been created for peerages themselves (e.g. The Lord George-Brown). In a similar way, some peerage titles have been invented by combining surnames (e.g. The Viscount Leverhulme was invented by William Lever by combining his and his wife's surname of Hulme) or combining other names (e.g. The Viscount Alanbrooke which was created by Alan Brooke by combining his first and last names).

"Multiple" and "compound" peerage titles have also evolved. A single individual can accumulate, by achievements or by inheritance, more than one peerage (of the same rank) and be known by a 'compound' of these titles (e.g. "The Duke of Buccleuch and Queensberry'" even though these peerages were originally created separately (i.e. the Dukedom of Buccleuch (created in 1663) and the Dukedom of Queensberry (created in 1684) but unified in the person of Henry Scott, 3rd Duke of Buccleuch and 5th Duke of Queensberry and his descendants).

On the other hand, a "compound" peerage refers to a title specifically created as a compound of two or more names, such as Baron Saye and Sele (created in 1440) and Baron Brougham and Vaux (created in 1830). The last hereditary compound titles to be created (for each rank) were the Duke of Clarence and Avondale (created in 1890), the Marquess of Aberdeen and Temair (created in 1916), the Earl of Strathmore and Kinghorne (created in 1937), the Viscount Newry and Mourne (created in 1822) and the Baron Dalling and Bulwer (created in 1871).

=== Geographic association ===
A territorial designation is often added to the main peerage title, especially in the case of barons and viscounts: for instance, The Baroness Thatcher, of Kesteven in the County of Lincolnshire, or The Viscount Montgomery of Alamein, of Hindhead in the County of Surrey. Any designation after the comma does not form a part of the main title. Territorial designations in titles are not updated with local government reforms, but new creations do take them into account. Thus there is The Baron Knollys, of Caversham in the County of Oxford (created in 1902), and The Baroness Pitkeathley, of Caversham in the Royal County of Berkshire (created in 1997).

It was once the case that a peer administered the place associated with his title (such as an earl administering a county as high sheriff or main landowner), but lordships by tenure have not been commonplace since the early Norman period. The only remaining peerages with certain associated rights over land are the Duchy of Cornwall (place), which appertains to the Dukedom of Cornwall, held by the eldest son and heir to the sovereign, and the Duchy of Lancaster (place), which regular income (revenue) appertains to the Dukedom of Lancaster, held by the sovereign whose government owns the capital and all capital gains on disposals. In both cases due to the particular function of bona vacantia in these areas, these titles afford rights encompassing the whole territorial designation of the holder, donated by the holder now to registered charities. Separate estates, smaller than counties, form the bulk of the two duchies.

== Styles and forms of address ==
=== Style ===
Dukes use His Grace (used in speech only by those in a serving capacity, e.g., sales persons or household servants; others say simply "Duke") and The Most Noble, Marquesses use The Most Honourable and other peers use The Right Honourable. Peeresses (whether they hold peerages in their own right or are wives of peers) use equivalent styles.

=== Honorific ===
Individuals who use the appellation Lord or Lady are not necessarily peers. There are judicial, ecclesiastic and holders of other crown offices who are often accorded the appellation "Lord" or "Lady" as a form of courtesy title as a product of their office. Those who hold feudal titles are, however, never accorded the honorific "Lord". The holder of a lordship of the manor for example can be styled as Charles S, Lord/Lady of the Manor of [Placename], but would not be referred to as Lord Charles S of [Placename].

In speech, any peer or peeress except a Duke or Duchess is referred to as Lord X or Lady X. The exception is a suo jure baroness (that is, one holding the dignity in her own right, usually a life peeress), who may also be called Baroness X in normal speech, though Lady X is also common usage. Hence, The Baroness Thatcher, a suo jure life peeress, was referred to as either "Baroness Thatcher" or "Lady Thatcher". "Baroness" is incorrect for female holders of Scottish Lordships of Parliament, who are not Baronesses; for example, the 21st Lady Saltoun was known as "Lady Saltoun", not "Baroness Saltoun".

A peer is referred to by his peerage even if it is the same as his surname, thus the Baron Owen is "Lord Owen" not "Lord David Owen", though such erroneous forms are commonly used.

Some peers, particularly life peers who were well known before their ennoblement, do not use their peerage titles. Others use a combination: for example, the author John Julius Norwich was John Julius Cooper, 2nd Viscount Norwich.

Children of peers use special titles called courtesy titles. The heir apparent of a duke, a marquess, or an earl generally uses his father's highest lesser peerage dignity as his own. Hence, The Duke of Devonshire's son is called the Marquess of Hartington. Such an heir apparent is called a courtesy peer, but is a commoner until such time as he inherits (unless summoned by a writ in acceleration).

Younger sons of dukes and marquesses prefix Lord to their first names as courtesy titles while daughters of dukes, marquesses and earls use Lady. Younger sons of earls and children of viscounts, barons and lords of Parliament use The Honourable.

Divorced peeresses "cannot claim the privileges or status of Peeresses which they derived from their husbands". While a divorced former wife of a duke is no longer a duchess, she may still use the title, styled with her forename prefixed to the title (without the definite article, the). Her forename is used primarily to differentiate her from any new wife of her former husband. However, should the former husband remain unmarried, the former wife may continue to use the title without her forename attached. Should a former wife of a peer remarry, she would lose the style of a divorced peeress and take on a style relating to her new husband. Examples include Louise Timpson, who during her marriage to The Duke of Argyll was known as Her Grace The Duchess of Argyll but became Louise, Duchess of Argyll following her divorce, a style which she eventually lost after her subsequent marriage upon which she became known as Mrs. Robert Timpson.

== Vestments ==
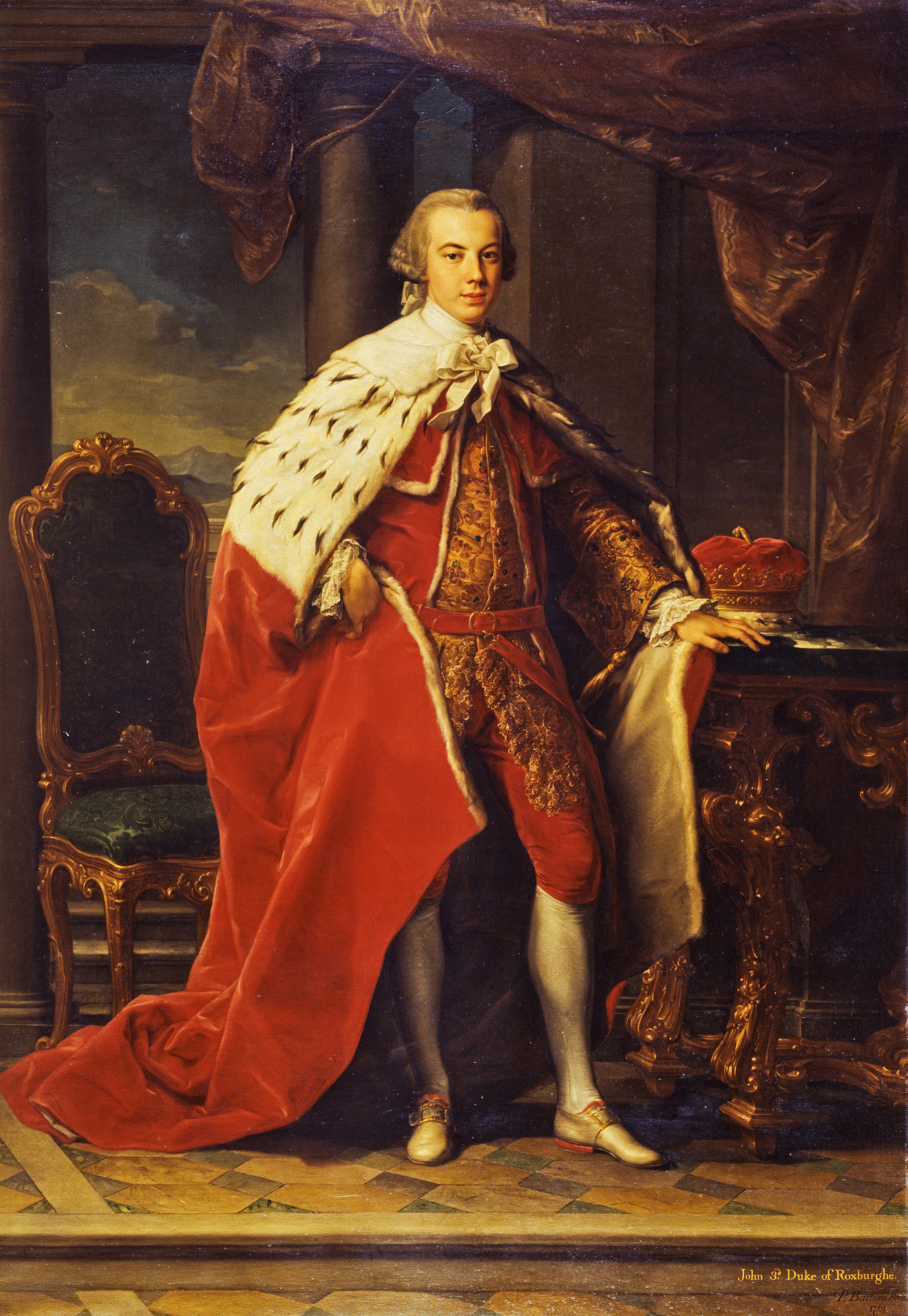
Peers wear ceremonial robes, whose designs are based on their rank.

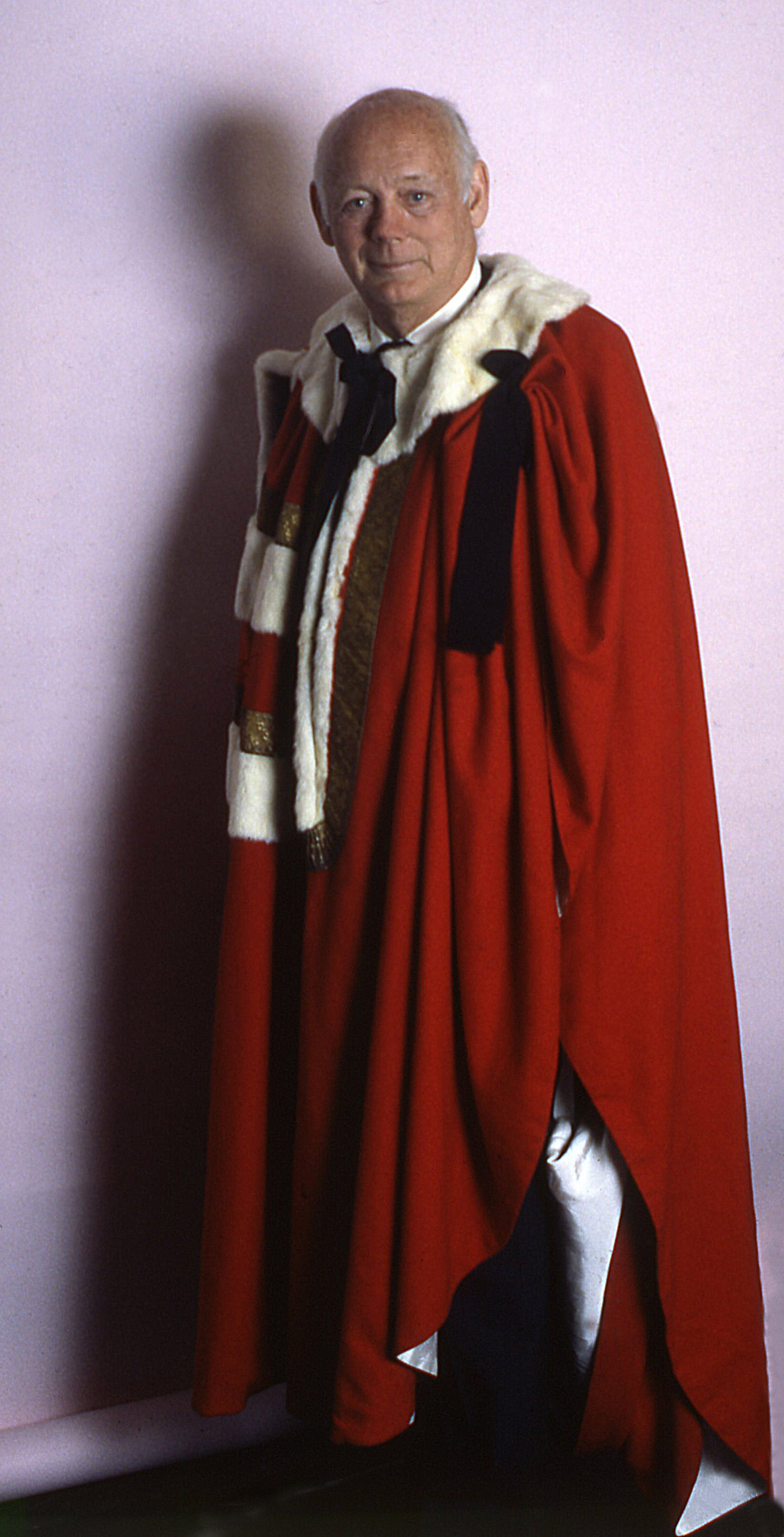
Edward Douglas-Scott-Montagu, 3rd Baron Montagu of Beaulieu wearing the parliamentary robes of a baron

=== Robes ===
Peerage robes are currently worn in the United Kingdom on ceremonial occasions. They are of two varieties: parliament robes, worn in the House of Lords on occasions such as at a peer's introduction or state opening of parliament, and coronation robes, worn at the coronations of monarchs. The details of the fur on these robes differs according to a peer's rank.

Since the early Middle Ages, robes have been worn as a sign of nobility. At first, these seem to have been bestowed on individuals by the monarch or feudal lord as a sign of special recognition; but in the fifteenth century the use of robes became formalised with peers all wearing robes of the same basic design, though varied according to the rank of the wearer.

=== Coronets and headgear ===
Duke/Duchess

Marquess/Marchioness

Earl/Countess

Viscount/Viscountess

Baron/Baroness

In the United Kingdom, a peer wears their coronet on only one occasion: for the monarch's coronation, when it is worn along with coronation robes.

- The coronet of a duke or duchess has eight strawberry leaves;
- The coronet of a marquess or marchioness has four strawberry leaves and four silver balls (known as "pearls");
- The coronet of an earl or countess has eight strawberry leaves and eight "pearls" raised on stalks;
- The coronet of a viscount or viscountess has sixteen "pearls" touching one another;
- The coronet of a baron or baroness, or lord or lady of parliament in the Scots peerage, has six "pearls", and a plain circlet lacking the gem-shaped chasing of the other coronets.

The robes and coronets used at Elizabeth II's coronation in 1953 cost about £1,250 (roughly £30,300 in present-day terms). (Peers under the rank of an Earl, however, were allowed in 1953 to wear a cheaper "cap of estate" in place of a coronet, as were peeresses of the same rank, for whom a simpler robe was also permitted (a one-piece gown with wrap-around fur cape, designed by Norman Hartnell).

With the Parliament robe, a black hat was customarily worn. The Wriothesley Garter Book provides a contemporary illustration of the 1523 State Opening of Parliament: the two dukes present are shown wearing coronets with their parliament robes, but the other Lords Temporal are all wearing black hats. The Lords Spiritual are wearing mitres with their distinctive robes. Mitres ceased to be worn after the Reformation, and the wearing of hats in Parliament ceased, for the most part, when wigs came into fashion. They survive today only as part of the dress of Lords Commissioners, when they are worn with the parliamentary robe: a bicorn hat for men (of black beaver, edged with silk grosgrain ribbon) and a tricorne-like hat for women. (The use of these hats at introductions of peers to the House was discontinued in 1998.)

== Precedence ==
Peers are entitled to a special precedence because of their ranks. Wives and children of peers are also entitled to a special precedence because of their station.

The sovereign may, as fount of honour, vary the precedence of the peers or of any other people. For example, Elizabeth II granted her husband, Prince Philip, Duke of Edinburgh, precedence immediately following her; otherwise, he would have ranked along with the other dukes of the peerage of the United Kingdom.

=== General precedence ===
In England and Wales, the sovereign ranks first, followed by the Royal Family. Then follow the Archbishops of Canterbury and York, the Great Officers of State and other important state functionaries such as the prime minister. Thereafter, dukes precede marquesses, who precede earls, who precede viscounts, who precede bishops, who precede barons and lords of Parliament.

Within the members of each rank of the peerage, peers of England precede peers of Scotland. English and Scottish peers together precede peers of Great Britain. All of the aforementioned precede peers of Ireland created before 1801. Last come peers of Ireland created after 1801 and peers of the United Kingdom. Among peers of the same rank and Peerage, precedence is based on the creation of the title: those whose titles were created earlier precede those whose titles were created later. But in no case would a peer of a lower rank precede one of a higher rank. For example, the Duke of Fife, the last non-royal to be created a duke, would come before the Marquess of Winchester, though the latter's title was created earlier and is in a more senior peerage (the peerage of England).

The place of a peer in the order for gentlemen is taken by his wife in the order for ladies, except that a dowager peeress of a particular title precedes the present holder of the same title. Children of peers (and suo jure peeresses) also obtain a special precedence. The following algorithm may be used to determine their ranks:

- Eldest sons of peers of rank X go after peers of rank X−1
- Younger sons of peers of rank X go after eldest sons of peers of rank X−1
- Wives have a precedence corresponding to those of their husbands
- Daughters of peers of rank X go after wives of eldest sons of peers of rank X

Over time, however, various offices were inserted at different points in the order, thereby varying it.

Eldest sons of dukes rank after marquesses; eldest sons of marquesses and then younger sons of dukes rank after earls; eldest sons of earls and then younger sons of marquesses rank after viscounts. Eldest sons of viscounts, younger sons of earls, and then eldest sons of barons, in that order, follow barons, with the Treasurer of the Household, the Comptroller of the Household, the Vice-Chamberlain of the Household and Secretaries of State being interpolated between them and the barons. Younger sons of viscounts, and then younger sons of barons, come after the aforesaid eldest sons of barons, with Knights of the Order of the Garter and Order of the Thistle, Privy councillors and senior judges being intercalated between them and eldest sons of barons.

Children of the eldest son of a peer also obtain a special precedence. Generally, the eldest son of the eldest son of a peer comes immediately before his uncles, while the younger sons of the eldest son of a peer come after them. Therefore, eldest sons of eldest sons of dukes come before younger sons of dukes, and younger sons of eldest sons of dukes come after them, and so forth for all the ranks. Below the younger sons of barons are baronets, knights, circuit judges and companions of the various orders of Chivalry, followed by the eldest sons of younger sons of peers.

Wives of all of the aforementioned have precedence corresponding to their husbands', unless otherwise entitled to a higher precedence, for instance by virtue of holding a certain office. An individual's daughter takes precedence after the wife of that individual's eldest son and before the wives of that individual's younger sons. Therefore, daughters of peers rank immediately after wives of eldest sons of peers; daughters of eldest sons of peers rank immediately after wives of eldest sons of eldest sons of peers; daughters of younger sons of peers rank after wives of eldest sons of younger sons of peers. Such a daughter keeps her precedence if marrying a commoner (unless that marriage somehow confers a higher precedence), but rank as their husband if marrying a peer.

=== Precedence within Parliament ===
The order of precedence used to determine seating in the House of Lords chamber is governed by the House of Lords Precedence Act 1539. Precedence as provided by the Act is similar to, but not the same as, the order outside Parliament. The sovereign, however, does not have the authority to change the precedence assigned by the Act.

Lords Temporal assume precedence similar to precedence outside Parliament. One difference in the precedence of peers relates to the positions of the Great Officers of State and the officers of the sovereign's Household. Some Great Officers—the Lord Chancellor, the Lord High Treasurer, the Lord President of the Council and the Lord Privy Seal—provided they are peers, rank before all other peers except those who are of the Blood Royal (no precedence is accorded if they are not peers). The positions of the other Great Officers—the Lord Great Chamberlain, the Lord High Constable, the Earl Marshal and the Lord High Admiral—and the officers of the Household—the Lord Steward and the Lord Chamberlain—are based on their respective ranks. Thus, if the Lord Steward were a duke, he would precede all dukes, if a marquess, he would precede all marquesses, and so on. If two such officers are of the same rank, the precedence of the offices (reflected by the order in which they are mentioned above) is taken into account: if the Lord Great Chamberlain and Earl Marshal were both marquesses, for example, then the Great Chamberlain would precede the Earl Marshal, as the former office precedes the latter.

In practice, however, the Act is obsolete, as the Lords do not actually sit according to strict precedence; instead, peers sit with their political parties.

== Heraldry ==
Peers are generally entitled to use certain heraldic devices. Atop the arms, a peer may display a coronet. Dukes were the first individuals authorised to wear coronets. Marquesses acquired coronets in the 15th century, earls in the 16th and viscounts and barons in the 17th. Until the barons received coronets in 1661, the coronets of earls, marquesses and dukes were engraved while those of viscounts were plain. After 1661, however, viscomital coronets became engraved, while baronial coronets were plain. Coronets may not bear any precious or semi-precious stones. Generally, only peers may use the coronets corresponding to their ranks. The Bishop of Durham, however, may use a duke's coronet atop the arms as a reference to the historical temporal authority of the Prince-Bishops of Durham.

Peers wear their coronets at coronations. Otherwise, coronets are seen only in heraldic representations, atop a peer's arms. Coronets include a silver gilt chaplet and a base of ermine fur. The coronet varies with the rank of the peer. A member of the Royal Family uses a royal coronet instead of the coronet he or she would use as a peer or peeress.

Ducal coronets include eight strawberry leaves atop the chaplet, five of which are displayed in heraldic representations. Marquesses have coronets with four strawberry leaves alternating with four silver balls, of which three leaves and two balls are displayed. Coronets for earls have eight strawberry leaves alternating with eight silver balls (called "pearls" even though they are not) raised on spikes, of which five silver balls and four leaves are displayed. Coronets for viscounts have 16 silver balls, of which seven are displayed. Finally, baronial coronets have six silver balls, of which four are displayed. Peeresses use equivalent designs, but in the form of a circlet, which encircles the head, rather than a coronet, which rests atop the head.

Peers are entitled to the use of supporters in their achievements of arms. Hereditary supporters are normally limited to hereditary peers, certain members of the Royal Family, chiefs of Scottish Clans, Scottish feudal barons whose baronies predate 1587. Non-hereditary supporters are granted to life peers, Knights of the Garter, Knights of the Thistle, Knights and Dames Grand Cross of the Bath, Knights and Dames Grand Cross of St Michael and St George, Knights and Dames Grand Cross of the Royal Victorian Order, Knights and Dames Grand Cross of the British Empire, and knights banneret.

Peers, like most other armigers, may display helms atop their arms. Helms of peers are depicted in silver and facing the viewer's left. The helm is garnished in gold and the closed visor has gold bars, normally numbering five. Along with the helm, peers use a mantling, one side of which is red and the other a representation of the heraldic fur ermine. The mantling of peers is emblazoned gules, doubled ermine. Peeresses and other female armigers do not bear helms or mantlings.

== Attempted primogeniture reforms ==
Since the Parliament of the United Kingdom enacted a series of reforms (from the 1960s onward) to the honours system, few hereditary titles have been created (the last non-royal title being created in 1990), while life peerages have proliferated, allowing for more openly LGBT persons to be appointed to the House of Lords. However, despite the legalization of civil partnerships for same-sex couples in 2004 and marriage for same-sex couples in 2013, spouses of ennobled civil partners have not been allowed the extension of title and privilege from their spouses' ennoblements as those accorded to married opposite-sex spouses of ennobled persons. In July 2012, Conservative MP Oliver Colvile announced a private member's bill, titled "Honours (Equality of Titles for Partners) Bill 2012-13", to amend the honours system to both allow husbands of those made dames and for civil partners of recipients to receive honours by their relationship statuses. Another bill, the Equality (Titles) Bill, which would allow for both female first-born descendants to inherit hereditary titles as well as for "husbands and civil partners" of honours recipients "to use equivalent honorary titles to those available to wives", was introduced by Lord Lucas in the House of Lords on 13 May 2013, but did not progress past Committee stage. Similar legislation was introduced in 2015, 2016 and 2023.

== Counterparts ==
Other feudal monarchies equally held a similar system, grouping high nobility of different rank titles under one term, with common privileges and/or in an assembly, sometimes legislative and/or judicial.

Itō Hirobumi and the other Meiji leaders deliberately modeled the Japanese House of Peers on the House of Lords, as a counterweight to the popularly elected House of Representatives (Shūgiin).

In France, the system of pairies (peerage) existed in two different versions: the exclusive 'old' in the French kingdom, in many respects an inspiration for the English and later British practice, and the very prolific Chambre des Pairs under the Bourbon Restoration (1814–1848).

In Spain and Portugal, the closest equivalent title was Grandee; in Hungary, Magnat.

In the Kingdom of Sicily a peerage was instituted in 1812 in connection with the abolition of feudalism: peers were nominated based on the taxable incomes of their formerly feudal estates.

In the Holy Roman Empire, instead of an exclusive aristocratic assembly, the legislative body was the Imperial Diet, membership of which, expressed by the title Prince of the Holy Roman Empire, was granted to allied princely families (and various minor ones), as well as to Princes of the Church (parallel to the Lords Spiritual) and in some cases was restricted to a collective 'curiate' vote in a 'bench', such as the Grafenbank.

In the medieval Irish nobility, Gaelic nobles were those presented with the White Wand or slat in a formal ceremony, and presented it by another noble. It was the primary symbol of lordship and effectively reserved only for the three tiers of kings (provincial, regional, local) and for those princely and comital families descending from them in control of significant territories. The total number was between 100 and 150 at any time.

== See also ==
Peerages and baronetcies of Britain and Ireland
Extant	All
Dukes	Dukedoms
Marquesses	Marquessates
Earls	Earldoms
Viscounts	Viscountcies
Barons	Baronies
Baronets	Baronetcies

Related

- British honours system
- British nobility
- Social class in the United Kingdom
- Orders of precedence in the United Kingdom
- Forms of address in the United Kingdom
- Post-nominal letters
- Nobiliary particle
- College of Arms
- Court of the Lord Lyon
- Scottish clan
- Baronage of Scotland
- Substantive title

Peerages in the British Isles

- Peerage of Great Britain
- Peerage of England
- Welsh peers and baronets
- Peerage of Scotland
- List of Scottish representative peers
- Peerage of Ireland
- List of Irish representative peers
- List of life peerages (Life Peerages Act, 1958)
- List of law life peerages (Appellate Jurisdiction Act, 1876)
- List of spiritual peers
- List of British Jewish nobility and gentry
- List of courtesy titles in the peerages of Britain and Ireland

Peerages in the Commonwealth

- Australian peers and baronets
- Canadian peers and baronets
- Canadian titles debate
- Orders, decorations, and medals of New Zealand

Legal

- Peerage law
- Baronies created by error
- Cash-for-Honours scandal
- False titles of nobility

Other

- Monarchy
- Aristocracy
- Feudalism
- Nobility
- Landed gentry
- Upper class
- Caste

== Bibliography ==
- Blackstone, W. (1765). Commentaries on the Laws of England. Oxford: Clarendon Press.
- Bush, Michael L. The English Aristocracy: a Comparative Synthesis. Manchester University Press, 1984. Concise comparative historical treatment.
- Ellis, Geoffrey (1911). "Peerage" . Encyclopædia Britannica. Vol. 21 (11th ed.). pp. 45–55.
- Farnborough, T. E. May, 1st Baron. (1896). Constitutional History of England since the Accession of George the Third, 11th ed. London: Longmans, Green and Co.
- Paul, James Balfour (ed.). The Scots Peerage Founded on ... Sir Robert Douglas's Peerage of Scotland. 9v. Edinburgh: David Douglas, 1904–14.
- Peerage Act 1963. (1963 c. 48). London: Her Majesty's Stationery Office.
- Plowden. Alison. Lords of the Land. Michael Joseph, 1984.
- Sanford, John Langton and Meredith Townsend. The Great Governing Families of England. 2v. Blackwood & Sons, 1865 (Books for Libraries Press, 1972).
