= Political funding in the United Kingdom =

Political funding in the United Kingdom refers to all funds that are raised and spent for political purposes. Political parties and, by extension, politicians in the United Kingdom receive funding from a variety of sources, including membership fees, party donations, and state funding.

There also exist non-party organisations such as campaigning organisations; for instance, Vote Leave and Britain Stronger in Europe represented the "leave" and "remain" campaigns respectively in the referendum to decide if the UK should continue to remain a member of, or leave, the European Union.

Political funding has often been a source of major controversy. Prime Ministers including David Cameron and Boris Johnson have been criticized for offering private dinners to large donors.

Unlike most European nations, foreigners and large corporations are allowed to give money to political parties. In 2025, the chair of the UK Electoral Commission described British campaign finance rules as “out of date” and "weak"

== Electoral Commission ==
The Electoral Commission is the "independent statutory body responsible for overseeing the delivery of elections and electoral registration, delivering UK referendums, and regulating political finance in the UK." The organisation's search tool allows the public to view donations and loans, above a certain threshold, to political parties, non-party campaigners, referendum participants, and regulated doners.

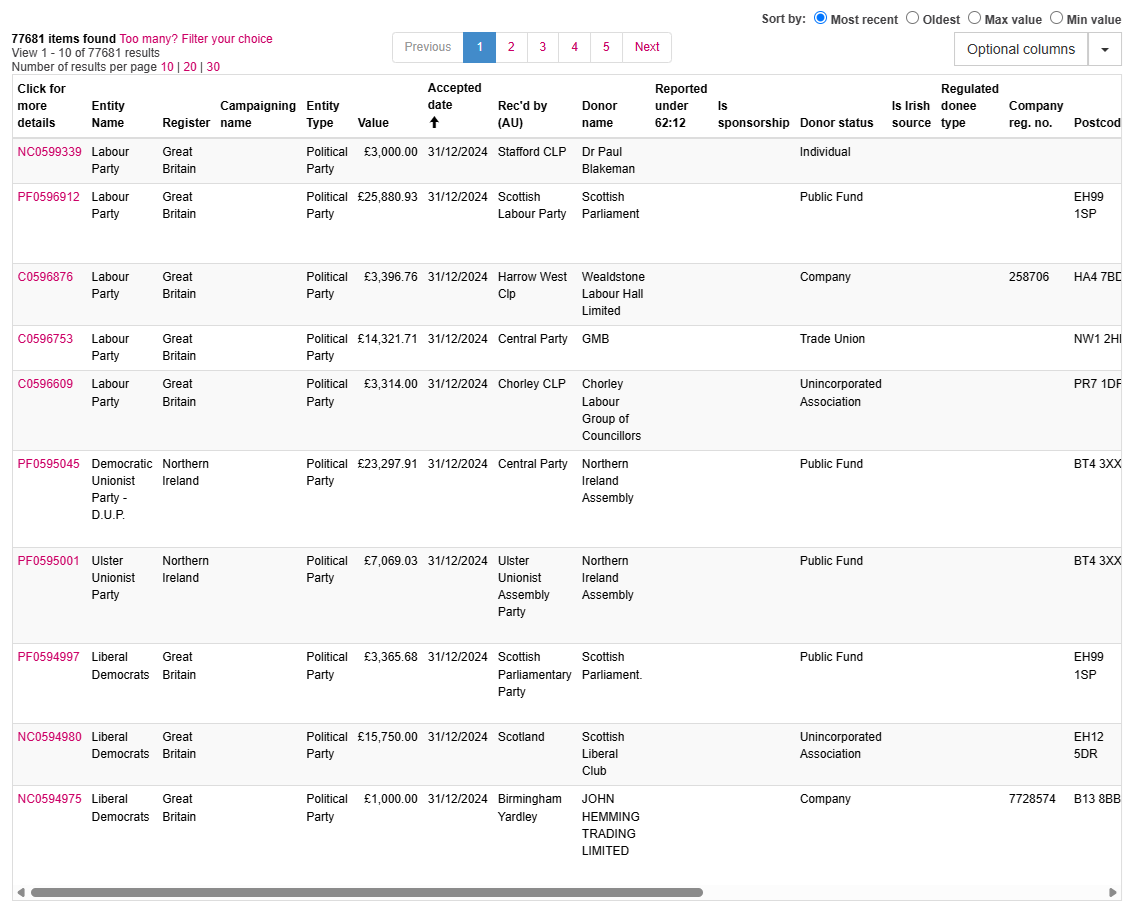
Public data from the UK Electoral Commission on recent party donations.

== Political parties ==
According to a briefing paper from the House of Commons Library, UK political parties "fund their activities through public funding, donations, loans and membership fees."

=== Public funding ===
Opposition parties receive state funding to pay administration cost; Short Money in the House of Commons starting in 1975, and Cranborne Money in the House of Lords starting in 1996 however, there is no state funding available to parties for campaign purposes.

In addition, there is a general policy development grant available to parties with two MPs who have taken the oath of allegiance. The Policy Development Grant scheme is administered by the Electoral Commission and allocates a total of £2m to eligible parties each year.

=== Donations ===
The Conservative Party relies on donations mostly from individuals and companies; as well as these sources the Labour Party receives a significant portion of its donations from trade unions. For example, in the third quarter of 2009, eighteen political parties reported donations totalling £9,532,598 (excluding public funds). The Conservative Party received £5,269,186, the Labour party received £3,045,377 and the Liberal Democrats received £816,663. Donations typically peak before elections. Between 6 April and 6 May 2010 (a general election campaign month) the Conservatives took £7,317,602, Labour £5,283,199 and the Liberal Democrats £724,000.

Quarter-by-quarter aggregates of donations above reporting thresholds are available from the UK Electoral Commission. The following table shows the sum of donations above the reporting thresholds for UK parties with seats in the House of Commons. These figures would not include e.g. a large number of small donations.

Donations above reporting threshold
Year	Conservative Party	Labour Party	Liberal Democrats	Scottish National Party
2013	£16,358,446	£20,945,689	£4,372,188	0
2014	£29,366,474	£26,388,844	£8,796,956	£4,151,337
2015 (GE)	£33,620,578	£28,678,161	£7,784,137	£2,171,696
2016	£18,031,645	£21,321,339	£7,686,657	0
2017 (GE)	£37,775,223	£23,126,548	£7,864,244	£2,019,202
2018	£22,067,325	£16,664,422	£4,562,007	0
2019 (GE)	£52,919,571	£24,886,998	£20,017,727	0
2020	£15,562,333	£14,536,760	£4,767,340	0
2021	£20,128,172	£17,061,396	£4,539,942	£1,917,301

=== Membership fees ===
Membership subscriptions ("subs") provide one source of funding for political parties. However, in recent times membership has declined and campaign costs have grown.

The Green Party is the only major political party in the UK which receives the majority of its funding through membership fees and these are what cover the running costs of the organisation. Membership subs have become a more significant source in income for both the SNP and Labour in recent years, as both have seen substantial increases in membership.

== Third parties ==
Third parties are "individuals or organisations that campaign in the run up to elections, but are not standing as political parties or candidates."

== History ==
The first effort to regulate the financial dimension of political competition was the Corrupt and Illegal Practices Prevention Act 1883. Although this landmark legislation was concerned with constituency candidates, their campaign expenses and their agents only, all other efforts to create a political finance regime started from here. The next legislative step to deal with the subject was the Honours (Prevention of Abuses) Act 1925 that sought to end the selling of titles in exchange for donations to political parties.

In August 1976 the Committee on Financial Aid to Political Parties, chaired by Lord Houghton of Sowerby, proposed that financial aid to political parties should be given in two forms: (a) general grants to the central organisations for their general purposes and (b) a limited reimbursement of election expenses to parliamentary and local government candidates.

Starting in 2006, political funding came under scrutiny as concerns grew that the largest British political parties were too dependent on a handful of wealthy donors. Furthermore, during the Cash for Honours scandal, concern grew even more. A concern of the 1970s had been that the major parties were unable to raise sufficient funds to operate successfully.

=== The Political Parties, Elections and Referendums Act 2000 ===
The Political Parties, Elections and Referendums Act 2000 (PPERA) was an act that established the Electoral Commission and required all political parties to register with it, set down accounting requirements for political parties, and introduced controls on donations.

=== 2006 Sir Hayden Phillips inquiry ===
In March 2006, former civil servant Sir Hayden Phillips was charged with setting up an inquiry to come up with proposal for reform. It reported a year later. He recommended capping individual donations at £50,000 and capping spending for political campaigns. He also suggested increasing state funding by £25m and expanding its reach.

=== 2008 Ministry of Justice report ===
In June 2008, the Ministry of Justice released a white paper analyzing party finance and expenditure. The paper proposed to tighten controls on spending by parties and candidates, substantially strengthen the powers of the Electoral Commission, and increase the transparency of donations.

=== 2011 Committee on Standards in Public Life report ===
In November 2011 the Committee on Standards on Public Life, chaired by Sir Christopher Kelly, published a Report on "Political Party Finance. Ending the big donor culture". It is their 13th report, Cm. 8208. The report made five main recommendations:

1. Contribution limit of £10,000 per donor, party and year;
2. this limit should not apply to affiliated trade union affiliation fees if such fees are raised by an "opt in";
3. existing limits for campaign spending should be cut by about 15 percent;
4. in addition to the present "policy development grant" eligible parties should be granted public funding at the rate of £3.00 per vote in Westminster elections and £1.50 per vote in devolved and European elections;
5. income tax relief should be available for donations up to £1,000 and membership fees to political parties.

== Transparency ==
Donations worth over £11,180 (Previously £7,500)to national parties must be declared, as must be donations worth £2,230 (Previously £1,500) or more to local associations. Donations to members' associations – groups whose members are primarily or entirely members of a single political party – also need to be declared above £11,180 (Previously £7,500). This produces a loophole where donors can donate larger sums to local candidates while remaining anonymous, by channelling those donations through a members' association such as the United and Cecil Club.

For a while, as a loophole, loans did not have to be declared.

Northern Ireland political parties are exempt from revealing the identity of party donors due to security reasons.

== Regulation ==
The general restrictions in the UK were held in Bowman v United Kingdom to be fully compatible with Article 10 of the European Convention on Human Rights.

== Controversies ==
=== Vote Leave ===
In 2018, Vote Leave, the campaign group representing the "leave" side of the 2016 referendum on continued EU membership, was fined £61,000 after the Electoral Commission found that Vote Leave and BeLeave, another campaign group, "did not declare their joint working and did not adhere to the legal spending limits."

=== "Cash for Honours" ===
In 2006 and 2007, a political scandal, dubbed "Cash for Honours", occurred after it was revealed that Prime Minister Tony Blair had nominated several people for life peerages who had loaned large amounts of money to his party, the Labour Party.

=== Donations from foreign sources or individuals with foreign ties ===
In 2018, former Brexit campaign boss Matthew Elliott disclosed that Vote Leave likely broke spending laws by transferring £680,000 to pro-Leave group BeLeave. This revelation followed whistleblower claims that Leave.EU (funded largely by Arron Banks) met repeatedly with Russian officials in 2015–2017.

In January 2022, MI5 issued an "interference alert" concerning Christine Lee, alleging that she had engaged in "political interference activities" on behalf of the Chinese Communist Party's United Front Work Department. According to The Guardian, a law firm bearing her name made £675,586 in political donations, including £584,177 in "donations in kind" (staffing support) to Labour MP Barry Gardiner's office between 2015 and 2020, plus smaller sums to others (e.g. £5,000 to the local association of Sir Ed Davey in April 2013).

In April 2026 it was revealed by The Guardian that Nigel Farage had not declared a donation of £5 million from Thai based billionaire Christopher Harborne in 2024; it is currently under investigation.

Since 2024 Reform UK, a have received a total of £57,190,000 from a UK crypto billionaire Christopher Harborne which is based in Thailand, this includes a single donation of £32 million which he, as well as Ben Delo each gave which are currently both the largest single donation in UK history.

In September 2026 Channel 4 aired an undercover investigation conducted by Verbatim which possed as a wealthy American to commission political polls on behalf of Reform UK, and proposed an illicit donation of £500,000 from an American to Reform UK. The Met police are currently investigating it.

== See also ==
=== National ===
- Cash-for-Honours scandal
- Cash for influence
- Constitutional Research Council
- Cranborne Money
- Short Money
- Labour Leader's Office Fund
- Labour Party (UK) affiliated trade union
- Labour Party proxy and undeclared donations (2007)
- Party political broadcast
- Peter Watt
- Midlands Industrial Council
- Cash-for-questions affair
- Honours (Prevention of Abuses) Act 1925
