= Succession to Peerages Bill =

Succession to Peerages Bill may refer to:

- Succession to Peerages Bill (2016-2017)
- Succession to Peerages Bill (2015-2016)
