= Matthew Oakeshott, Baron Oakeshott of Seagrove Bay =

British politician (born 1947)

The Right Honourable The Lord Oakeshott of Seagrove Bay
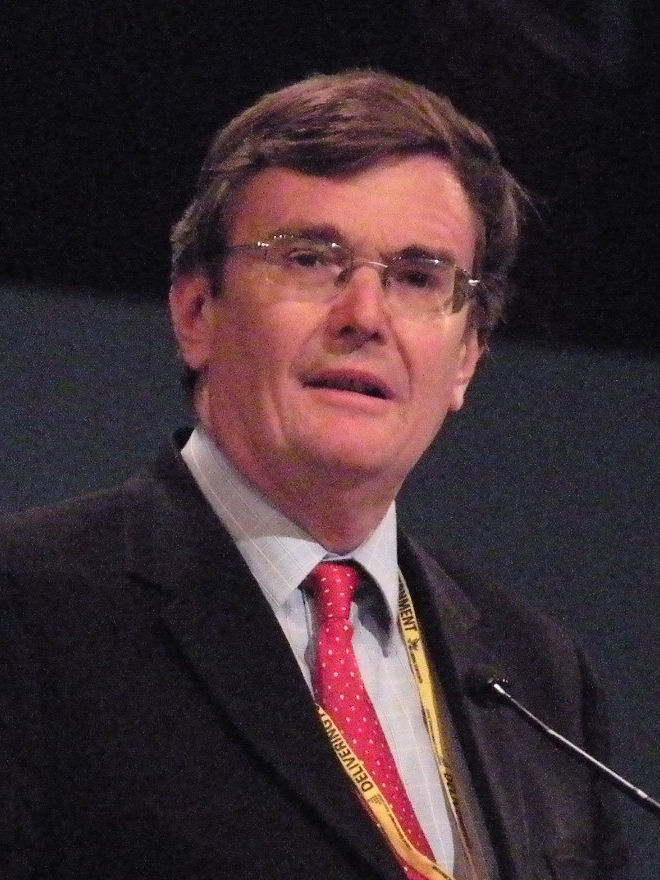
- Oakeshott in 2008

Member of the House of Lords
- Lord Temporal
- Life peerage 1 May 2000 – 16 July 2026

Personal details
- Born: 10 January 1947 (age 79)
- Party: Non-affiliated (since 2014)
- Other political affiliations: Labour (c. 1966–1981); SDP (1981–1988); Liberal Democrats (1988–2014)
- Spouse: Philippa Poulton (m. 1976)
- Children: 3

Matthew Alan Oakeshott, Baron Oakeshott of Seagrove Bay (born 10 January 1947), is a British investment manager and former member of the House of Lords, formerly sitting in Parliament as a Liberal Democrat.

== Early life and education ==
Matthew Alan Oakeshott was born on 10 January 1947 to Keith Robertson Oakeshott, CMG, and Eva (née Clutterbuck). Oakeshott was educated at Charterhouse before reading philosophy, politics and economics at University College, Oxford, graduating with a first, and attending Nuffield College, Oxford, where he undertook postgraduate studies without completing a degree.

== Early political career ==
Oakeshott was a member of the Labour Party whilst an undergraduate at Oxford, and was one of a group of 'moderate' students who launched a breakaway from the then "left-dominated" university Labour Club in 1966. He worked in the Ministry of Finance and Economic Planning of Kenya from 1968 to 1970, and served as a Labour councillor on Oxford City Council from 1972 to 1976.

In 1972, Oakeshott became a Parliamentary Assistant to Labour's Roy Jenkins in Opposition; a so-called "Chocolate Soldier", funded by the Joseph Rowntree Social Service Trust. When Jenkins became Home Secretary two years later, Oakeshott worked as his Special Advisor. Jenkins charged him with keeping "an eye on the Common Market 'negotiation' by forging a close relationship with George Thomson's cabinet in Brussels, but also to keep him in touch with Labour party feeling and help write speeches and newspaper articles." He was an instrumental part of the team that wrote the Limehouse Declaration, and joined the Social Democratic Party (SDP) upon its foundation in 1981. The SDP leader David Owen later described him as "an EEC 'federalist'".

Oakeshott stood twice, unsuccessfully, for election to the House of Commons of the United Kingdom. As a Labour parliamentary candidate he fought the Horsham and Crawley seat in 1974, and then as the SDP–Liberal Alliance candidate for the seat of Cambridge in 1983.

== Business career ==
After his time as Jenkins's parliamentary assistant came to an end in 1976, Oakeshott became a Director of Warburg Investment Management, a post which he held until 1981, and then investment manager of the Courtaulds pension fund until 1985. He was a founder director of OLIM in 1986 and is now Chairman of OLIM Property Limited, which invests in commercial property throughout the UK for pension funds, investment trusts and charities. He is joint investment director of Value and Income Trust plc (VIN).

== House of Lords (as Lord Oakeshott) ==
He was created a Life Peer as Baron Oakeshott of Seagrove Bay, of Seagrove in the county of Isle of Wight on 1 May 2000, serving as Liberal Democrat Treasury Spokesman in the House of Lords from 2001 to 2011 and as Pensions Spokesman from 2002 to 2010. He has been a leading enthusiast for reform of the House of Lords.

From the formation of the Coalition Government in May 2010 until his resignation from the Lib Dems in May 2014, Lord Oakeshott was highly critical of the Coalition's policies. He stood down as HM Government Treasury Spokesman by "mutual agreement" in February 2011, after his description of the Coalition's Project Merlin deal with the banks over lending and bonuses as being "pitiful". He was then critical of its economic policy, where he has particularly opposed the cut in the top rate of tax to 45p and the "austerity measures". He opposed key Coalition legislation such as the Health and Social Care Act and elected Police Commissioners. He called for Conservative Cabinet Minister Jeremy Hunt to resign over his handling of BSkyB, and in July 2012 referred to Conservative Chancellor of the Exchequer George Osborne as a "work-experience Chancellor" suggesting that he should resign and be replaced by Vince Cable. He supported Francois Hollande to become President of France, despite many in the Coalition backing Nicolas Sarkozy.

In 2012 he was already concerned about the future of the Lib Dems, being highly critical of Nick Clegg's leadership. During the latter part of 2013, Oakeshott began to call for Nick Clegg to resign as Leader of the Liberal Democrats, even suggesting that the Coalition may have to break apart.

In April 2014 he privately commissioned ICM Research to undertake a telephone poll in each of four key Lib Dem seats: Clegg's own Sheffield Hallam; Cambridge; Redcar; and Wells. The results indicated that the Lib Dems would pick up votes if another figure replaced Clegg as party leader, and also suggested that the party was on course to lose the four seats in the 2015 UK general election unless there was a change of Lib Dem leader. After the poll results were leaked via The Guardian newspaper on 27 May 2014, and Clegg on 28 May accused him of seeking to "undermine" the Lib Dems and warned he faced disciplinary action, Oakeshott subsequently resigned from the party and took a "leave of absence" from the House of Lords.

In an attempt to "help save our country from a Tory government cringing to UKIP" in January 2015 he donated £300,000 in total to 15 Labour candidates in the 2015 general election, £300,000 to 15 Liberal Democrats and £10,000 to the Green Party's sole MP, Caroline Lucas. In February 2015, Oakeshott was pictured wearing a red rosette and canvassing for Labour in Thurrock. He took leave of absence from the House of Lords on 28 February 2020.

== Family ==
In 1976, he married Philippa Poulton, a medical doctor. They have two sons, Joseph and Luke, and one daughter, Rachel.

He is related to the right-wing political journalist Isabel Oakeshott.

== Works ==
- A chapter in By-Elections in British Politics (1973)

Orders of precedence in the United Kingdom
Preceded by The Lord Powell of Bayswater	Gentlemen; Baron Oakeshott of Seagrove Bay	Followed by The Lord Brennan
