= United and Cecil Club =

British dining club

- Abbreviation: U&C
- Named after: Robert Gascoyne-Cecil, 3rd Marquess of Salisbury
- Formation: 1949
- Merger of: United Club (1881) and Cecil Club (1882)
- Type: Members' association
- Purpose: Raise funds for members of the club standing in marginal seats
- Headquarters: Winkfield, Berkshire
- Members: Approx 400 (2020)
- Affiliations: Conservative Party

The United and Cecil Club (U&C) is a British dining club with close links to the Conservative Party. Formed in 1949 following the merger of the United Club and the Cecil Club, the club is the seventh-largest donor to the Conservatives, and focuses its donations on marginal seats. Club members have been accused of taking advantage of a loophole in political fundraising laws to donate large sums to the Conservatives without declaring them.

== History ==
The two forerunners to the U&C were both formed in the 1880s following the death of the unifying figure Benjamin Disraeli. The Constituencies Union, which later became the United Club, was formed in 1881 to raise funds for Conservatives in difficult constituencies, while the National Review and Cecil Club was formed in 1882 by supporters of the Prime Minister Robert Gascoyne-Cecil, 3rd Marquess of Salisbury to publish the journal National Review. These served as bastions of conservatism during the National Government eras, but following the Second World War, they were merged by Winston Churchill, who served as president of both.

== Organisation ==
The membership of the club is private. However, in response to a question from the Parliamentary Commissioner for Standards in 2007, the club declared that it had around 400 members, who each paid membership fees of £100 annually. The club meets once a month while Parliament is in session for a total of eight dinners a year, and four of those dinners take place in the private banquet halls at the House of Commons. Dinners include a speech from a senior Conservative politician, and speakers have included John Major and David Cameron.

These dinners were subject to a complaint in 2006 from Labour MPs John Mann and Kevan Jones, who alleged that they constituted the illegal use of House of Commons facilities for party fundraising. An investigation by the Parliamentary Commissioner for Standards found that the meals at the Commons were charged at cost, and that the club's fundraising activities were restricted to events outside Parliament.

The club's official headquarters are registered by the Electoral Commission at a stables in Iver, Buckinghamshire, but in the parliamentary register at a riding school in Berkshire.

== Donations ==
An investigation by the Bureau of Investigative Journalism in the run-up to the 2015 United Kingdom general election found that the U&C was the biggest donor to Conservative candidates in the ten most marginal seats in the country. Between 2010 and 2014, its largest donations were in the marginal seats of Weaver Vale, Bury North, Carlisle and Cheadle, all of which were won or held by the Conservatives at the 2015 election. The club also raised funds for the Scottish Conservative Party during campaigning for the 2014 Scottish independence referendum.

In total, the club gave £712,230.63 to the Conservatives during the 2010–2015 Parliament, making them the seventh-largest donor to the party.

Under Electoral Commission rules, all donations of over £1,500 to a local party need to be publicly declared. However, donations to members' associations – groups like the U&C whose memberships are primarily or exclusively members of a single party – only need to be declared above £7,500, even when those donations are subsequently directed to local parties. The Alliance for Lobbying Transparency criticised this as deliberate exploitation of a loophole allowing donors to make large donations to the Conservatives – and, through the dinners, meet with senior Conservative politicians – while remaining anonymous.

== See also ==
- Midlands Industrial Council
