= Chocolate Soldier (Parliament) =

Former assistant in UK parliament

A Chocolate Soldier was a Parliamentary assistant for an opposition front bench spokesman in the House of Commons of the United Kingdom in the early 1970s, funded by the Joseph Rowntree Social Service Trust, which was endowed by the chocolate entrepreneur Joseph Rowntree.

The scheme was a pilot project to assist the opposition to carry out parliamentary duties and counteract the advantage that government ministers enjoy through briefings from civil servants, and was instigated by the trust's secretary, Pratap Chitnis. In 1974, the scheme was given official parliamentary support through the provision of Short Money to opposition parties, announced by Edward Short on 29 July 1974.

The Rowntree Trust made a similar fund available to the opposition in the late 1980s, to assist with travel expenses. This funding ceased in 1992, after the provision of Short Money was expanded to add a travel element.

== Chocolate Soldiers ==
Many Chocolate Soldiers later made a significant contribution in the public sphere. Among the assistants funded by the Rowntree Trust were:

- Matthew Oakeshott, assistant to Roy Jenkins
- Archy Kirkwood
