= Honours (Equality of Titles for Partners) Bill 2012-13 =

- Bill
- Parliament of the United Kingdom
- Long title: A Bill to make provision for husbands and civil partners of those receiving honours to be allowed to use equivalent honorary titles to those available to women; and for connected purposes.
- Introduced by: Oliver Colvile

Status: Not passed

The Honours (Equality of Titles for Partners) Bill 2012-13 was a private member's bill which would allow men who are married or civilly-partnered to peers, baronets, baronetesses, knights or dames of either sex to receive honours and the title "The Honourable" by way of their relationship statuses. The bill failed to pass beyond first reading.

== See also ==
- Equality (Titles) Bill
- Succession to Peerages Bill (2015–16)
- Succession to Peerages Bill (2016–17)
- Succession to Peerages and Baronetcies Bill
