= Equality (Titles) Bill =

- Bill
- Parliament of the United Kingdom
- Long title: A Bill to make provision for the succession of female heirs to hereditary titles; for husbands and civil partners of those receiving honours to be allowed to use equivalent honorary titles to those available to wives; and for connected purposes.
- Introduced by: The Lord Lucas and Dingwall

Status: Not passed

The Equality (Titles) Bill, known colloquially as the "Downton Law" and "Downton Abbey Law", was a bill of the Parliament of the United Kingdom introduced in 2013 that would have ended a measure of gender discrimination and allowed for equal succession of female heirs to hereditary titles and peerages. The primogeniture legislation, in conjunction with the Succession to the Crown Act 2013, would align hereditary titles in accordance with the Sex Discrimination Act 1975.

== Overview ==
The bill was dubbed the "Downton law" in reference to the British television drama Downton Abbey where the Earl's eldest daughter is unable to inherit the family seat because it can only be passed to a male heir. The Equality (Titles) Bill was precipitated by the passage of the Succession to the Crown Act 2013, which altered the laws of succession to the British throne so that male heirs no longer precede their elder sisters.

The bill was sponsored by the Lord Lucas and Dingwall in the House of Lords and has had two readings. The Queen consented to the bill's procession. Conservative MP Mary Macleod has sponsored the bill in the House of Commons and pointed out that only two of House of Lords' 92 hereditary peers are women.

After peer Lord Trefgarne remarked that the changes in succession would "set the hare running" on other inherited titles, a campaign group named "The Hares" was established. Prominent female aristocratic members of The Hares included Lady Sarah Carnegie, Lady Kitty Spencer, Lady Liza Campbell, and Lady Mary Charteris. Lady Sarah Carnegie served as the face of the movement, as after the death of her father, the 14th Earl of Northesk, his title was legally claimed by a male 8th cousin instead of herself, her father's eldest surviving child.

Despite the bill being in favour of gender equality, several female aristocrats refused to support the bill. Emma Manners, Duchess of Rutland, mother of the British fashion model, Lady Violet Manners, her eldest child, gave an interview to The Express, in which she stated that "[she was] delighted that the estate would be passed on to [her] son Charles, Marquess of Granby, instead of [her] first born Violet. It is a responsibility and a responsibility I am glad that my daughter does not have to bear.”

An amendment to the bill that would exclude baronetcies from its scope has been opposed by David Roche, Roddy Llewellyn, and Nicholas Stuart Taylor of the Stuart Taylor Baronetcy as well as Lord Monson. A number of the bill's supporters have titles that are in danger of dying out, as their only heirs are female.

Rejected at committee stage in the Lords, the Bill progressed no further but saw majority support in the Commons and prominent supporters in the Lords included former Home Secretary David Blunkett.

== See also ==
- Honours (Equality of Titles for Partners) Bill 2012-13
- Succession to Peerages Bill (2015–16)
- Succession to Peerages Bill (2016–17)
- Succession to Peerages and Baronetcies Bill
