= Writ of summons =

A writ of summons is a formal document issued by the monarch that enables someone to sit in a Parliament under the United Kingdom's Westminster system. At the beginning of each new Parliament, each person who has established their right to attend Parliament is issued a writ of summons. Without the writ, they are unable to sit or vote in Parliament.

In most countries, the constitutional logic of a Parliament as a "creature of the Head of State" does not exist; instead, the Parliament is considered to have an independent existence in its own right springing directly from the Constitution. Accordingly, there are no writs of summons, although members of Parliament have their memberships certified by an Election commission, returning officer or other similar body.

== History ==
Writs of summons generally follow the same form, whose nature has changed but little over the centuries. The words "writ" and "summons" appear nowhere in the writ.

Additional text may appear in the writ. For example, in the year 1264–5. At that time, Henry III of England was concerned for his first-born, the Lord Edward, because he had been ransomed for the more equitable distribution of power, which in the event was obtained by the Parliament holden at London on 20 January 1265.

By 1295 now under Edward I of England the form had changed. In fact, the writs of summons to that Parliament "are evidence about the nature and function of the developing body." The forms of address are particularly curious as they number three in type: whether it was to a prelate, a baron or a representative of a shire or town. And the latter are informed that "Since we intend to have a consultation and meeting with the barons" now therefore "we strictly require you to cause... to be elected without delay" various delegates of the lieux.

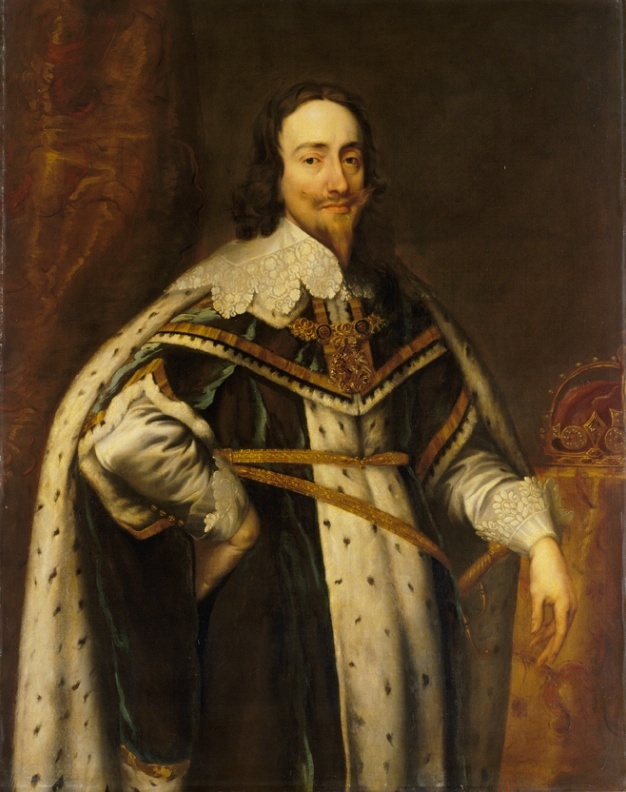
Charles I (pictured) attempted to withhold a writ of summons for John Digby, 1st Earl of Bristol in 1626.

It is established precedent that the sovereign may not deny writs of summons to qualified peers. In 1626, King Charles I ordered that the writ of summons of John Digby, 1st Earl of Bristol not be issued. Lord Bristol had been charged with treason but was never tried. He complained to the House of Lords, which resolved that the denial of a writ to an eligible peer was without precedent and that the sovereign should immediately issue a writ of summons, which did occur.

== Modern forms ==
=== To Peers ===
Modern summonses are without reference to royal hostages but in essence they flow in the same way. Firstly, they set out the titles of the Sovereign, and then those of the recipient. Next, they note the date for Parliament's calling and the reason for its calling. This portion of the writ differs based on whether Parliament is at the time sitting, or prorogued, or dissolved. Then, after commanding the recipient to attend, the writ indicates that the sovereign him or herself witnesses it. The form of writs issued to Peers while Parliament is dissolved is as follows:

Charles the Third by the Grace of God of the United Kingdom of Great Britain and Northern Ireland, and of Our other Realms and Territories King, Head of the Commonwealth, Defender of the Faith, To Our right trusty and well beloved XXXX Chevalier Greeting. Whereas by the advice and assent of Our Council for certain arduous and urgent affairs concerning Us, the state, and defence of Our United Kingdom and the Church, We have ordered a certain Parliament to be holden to Our City of Westminster on the XX day of XX next ensuing and there to treat and have conference with the Prelates, Great Men, and Peers of Our Realm. We strictly enjoining Command you upon the faith and allegiance by which you are bound to Us that the weightiness of the said affairs and imminent perils considered, waiving all excuses, you be at the said day and place personally present with Us and with the said Prelates, Great Men, and Peers to treat and give your counsel upon the affairs aforesaid. And this as you regard Us and Our honour and the safety and defence of the said Kingdom and Church and dispatch of the said affairs in nowise do you omit Witness Ourself at Westminster the XX day of XX in the XX year of Our Reign.

In the case of writs issued to Peers when Parliament is prorogued, the form of the first sentence of the second paragraph changes:

Whereas by reason of certain arduous and urgent affairs concerning Us the State and defence of Our United Kingdom and the Church We did lately with the advice and consent of Our Council ordain Our present Parliament to be holden at Our City of Westminster on the XX day of XX in the XX year of Our Reign which Parliament hath been from that time by several adjournments and prorogations adjourned prorogued and continued to and until the XX day of XX now next ensuing at Our City aforesaid to be then there holden. We strictly enjoining Command ...

In the case of writs issued during a session of Parliament, the form of the first sentence of the second paragraph changes:

Whereas Our Parliament for arduous and urgent affairs concerning Us the state and defence of Our United Kingdom and the Church is now met at Our City of Westminster We strictly enjoining Command ...
