= Midlands Industrial Council =

The Midlands Industrial Council is a British group of wealthy businessmen who help to fund the Conservative Party. According to the Sunday Times, they are one of the Party's 'most important financial backers'.

As well as the Conservative Party, they have also funded the Taxpayers Alliance, and individual Conservative parliamentary candidates.

The group is chaired by Johnny Leavesley, of The Leavesley Group. Previous chairmen include Lord Edmiston of the IM Group. The President is Lord Bamford of JCB Excavators. The MIC does not comment on its membership but it has been reported that it has only one Midlands industrial company member, among other individuals with an interest in importing products to the UK rather than in Midlands industry.

== See also ==
- United and Cecil Club
