= Short Money =

Annual payment to UK opposition parties

Short Money or Short money is the common name for the annual payment to opposition parties in the House of Commons of the United Kingdom to help them with their costs. It includes funding to assist an opposition party in carrying out its parliamentary business, for travel and associated expenses, and for the running costs of the Leader of the Opposition's office.

It is named after Edward Short, the then-Leader of the House of Commons who first proposed the payments. Cranborne Money is its counterpart in the House of Lords.

== Origin ==
Short Money was introduced by the Harold Wilson Government of 1974–76 following a commitment in the Queen's Speech of 12 March 1974: "My Ministers will consider the provision of financial assistance to enable Opposition parties more effectively to fulfil their Parliamentary functions".

Edward Short fleshed out the proposal in a statement on Members' allowances in July 1974:

A more immediate need is to provide additional support for the Opposition parties in Parliament — support which they certainly require if they are to play their full part here. The then Opposition and, I believe, the whole House benefited greatly from the Rowntree scheme, but more permanent arrangements are now necessary. Following our commitment in the Queen's Speech, I have had very helpful discussions with the parties opposite. I now plan to bring firm proposals before the House in the autumn.

The current scheme is administered under a resolution of the House of Commons of 26 May 1999.

== Recipients ==
Short Money is made available to all opposition parties in the House of Commons that secured either at least two seats or one seat and more than 150,000 votes at the previous general election.

The scheme has three components:

1. Funding to assist an opposition party in carrying out its parliamentary business
2. Funding for the opposition parties' travel and associated expenses
3. Funding for the running costs of the Leader of the Opposition's office

Short Money is not available to parties whose members have not sworn the Oath of Allegiance, such as Sinn Féin, because it was introduced to offer assistance for parliamentary duties. A separate scheme (introduced on 8 February 2006) provides funds to parties 'represented by Members who have chosen not to take their seats', providing for 'expenses wholly, exclusively and necessarily incurred for the employment of staff and related support to Members designated as that party's spokesman in relation to the party's representative business'. This is calculated on the same terms as Short Money. Other opposition parties have access to Short Money to support parliamentary business only and no equivalent extension for representative work. Parties are not obliged to take Short Money, with this happening in 2015 when the UK Independence Party's Douglas Carswell refused to accept it despite being entitled to it.

== 2023 amounts ==
In the financial year commencing 1 April 2023, eligible parties receive:

General funding for opposition parties
£21,438.33 for every seat won at the last election plus £42.82 for every 200 votes gained by the party.
Travel expenses for opposition parties
£235,511.46 is apportioned between each of the opposition parties in the same proportion as the amount given to each of them under the 'general funding' scheme set out above.
Leader of the Opposition's office
£998,817.35 is available for the running costs of the Leader of the Opposition's office. In addition, the Leader of the Opposition, the Opposition Chief Whip and the Assistant Opposition Whip receive a salary from public funds, on top of their parliamentary salary.

The funding helps support parties with a large, dispersed voter base such as Reform UK and the Green Party.

In his July 2015 budget, George Osborne cut Short Money by 19%, although the news did not emerge until the Autumn statement in November. The move was strongly criticised but Ministers argued that other areas of public finance were being similarly cut. Indexation was also linked to CPI rather than the more generous RPI inflation.
