= Succession to Peerages Bill (2016–17) =

- Bill
- Parliament of the United Kingdom
- Long title: A Bill to amend the law regarding succession to peerages; and for connected purposes.
- Introduced by: David Trefgarne, 2nd Baron Trefgarne

The Succession to Peerages Bill was a bill that planned to amend the law regarding succession to peerages and for connected purposes. The 2016-2017 session of Parliament was prorogued and this bill will make no further progress.

== Purpose ==
The Bill, the second attempt to introduce such a bill by Lord Trefgarne, was to apply the principle of absolute primogeniture to any and all hereditary peerages in Britain, and retroactively apply said absolute primogeniture to any peerages that went extinct on or after 6 February 1952 due to the absence of a male heir. The Bill did not apply to any peerages or honors held by the Queen or to succession of anything beyond the peerage, including associated land or other properties.

== See also ==
- Equality (Titles) Bill
- Honours (Equality of Titles for Partners) Bill 2012-13
- Succession to Peerages Bill (2015–16)
- Succession to Peerages and Baronetcies Bill
