= Succession to Peerages Bill (2015–16) =

- Bill
- Parliament of the United Kingdom
- Long title: A bill to amend the law regarding succession to peerages; and for connected purposes.
- Introduced by: David Trefgarne, 2nd Baron Trefgarne

Status: Not passed

The Succession to Peerages Bill was a bill intended to allow daughters of peers to inherit a peerage if the peerage would otherwise become extinct due to the absence of a male heir. It would have applied retrospectively to peerages that had become extinct since the start of the reign of Queen Elizabeth II in 1952.

The bill failed to reach the committee stage in the House of Lords and therefore died at the end of the parliamentary session.

== See also ==
- Equality (Titles) Bill
- Honours (Equality of Titles for Partners) Bill 2012-13
- Succession to Peerages Bill (2016–17)
- Succession to Peerages and Baronetcies Bill
