= Succession to Peerages and Baronetcies Bill =

Proposed United Kingdom law

- Bill
- Parliament of the United Kingdom
- Long title: A Bill to amend the law regarding succession to peerages and baronetcies; and for connected purposes.
- Introduced by: The Lord Northbrook

Status: Not passed

History of passage through Parliament

The Succession to Peerages and Baronetcies Bill is a proposed law of the Parliament of the United Kingdom introduced on 20 November 2023 by Lord Northbrook.

The bill proposes to change the law about hereditary peerages and baronetcies by removing male primogeniture to allow female heirs to take a hereditary peerage or baronetcy.

If enacted, it would align the hereditary peerage and baronetcy to the same laws of succession as the Crown. Previous attempts, such as Lord Lucas' Equality (Titles) Bill, and Lord Trefgarne's Succession to Peerages Bills 2015 and 2016, received significant support. The Government has previously promised to make this law.

As of 30 May 2024, the Bill will make no further progress through Parliament due to the dissolution before the 2024 United Kingdom general election.

Harriett Baldwin sponsored the bill before it was timed out.
