= Cranborne Money =

Annual payment to opposition parties in the UK House of Lords

Cranborne Money is the common name given to the annual payment to opposition parties in the UK House of Lords to help them with their costs. It is named after Lord Cranborne, who was the leader of the House of Lords when it was introduced on 27 November 1996. Short Money is its counterpart in the House of Commons.

== Annual allocations ==
Cranborne Money allocations (£)
	2009/10	2013/14	2022/23
Conservative Party	474,927	–	–
Labour Party	–	555,748	726,814
Liberal Democrats	237,126	–	362,892
Cross bench peers	61,003	71,770	95,013
Total	726,988	627,518	1,184,719

In addition to the above funds, the salaries of the Leader of the Opposition and Opposition Chief Whip in the House of Lords are also paid from public funds. In 2009/10 such payments amounted to £73,617 and £68,074 respectively.
