= Security and Intelligence Co-ordinator =

British Civil Service post

The Intelligence Co-ordinator, later Security and Intelligence Co-ordinator, was a senior post in the Cabinet Office of the British Civil Service that oversaw the intelligence services and their relationship to the government.

== Post holders ==
- 1968–1972: Sir Dick White
- 1972–1973: Sir Peter Wilkinson
- 1973–1978: Sir Leonard Hooper
- 1978–1980: Sir Brooks Richards
- 1980–1985: Sir Antony Duff
- 1985–1989: Sir Colin Figures
- 1989–1991: Sir Christopher Curwen
- 1991–1996: Sir Gerald Warner
- 1996–1999: John Alpass
- 1999–2000: Michael Pakenham
- 2000–2001: Peter Ricketts
- 2001–2002: John Scarlett

Sir David Omand was appointed to the post in 2002, following the September 11 attacks, as a subsidiary role to that of Cabinet Secretary, and served until his retirement in 2005. It was briefly held by Bill Jeffrey in 2005 until his appointment as Permanent Secretary at the Ministry of Defence, when it was granted to Sir Richard Mottram combined with the role of Chairman of the Joint Intelligence Committee to form Permanent Secretary for Intelligence, Security and Resilience.
