= Roger Horrell =

British intelligence officer (1935–2021)

Roger Horrell CMG, OBE (9 July 1935 – 21 May 2021) was a British diplomat and senior MI6 intelligence officer. He played a significant role in African affairs during decolonisation, most notably in the transition of Rhodesia to the independent state of Zimbabwe.

== Early life and education ==
Horrell was born in Dartmouth to a local butcher. He was educated at Shebbear College, where he excelled in academics and rugby. After performing his National Service with the Devonshire Regiment during the Mau Mau Uprising in Kenya, he attended Exeter College, Oxford, to read Modern History, and captained the college's rugby and cricket teams.

== Colonial service ==
In 1959, Horrell joined the Colonial Service and returned to Kenya as a District Officer. He served there until the country's independence, gaining a reputation for his ability to work with local chieftains through persuasion. His final reports from this era documented a wide breadth of responsibilities, ranging from land dispute resolution and famine relief to the administration of justice and school construction.

== MI6 career ==
=== Zimbabwe independence ===
Horrell was recruited by MI6, the British foreign intelligence service, after his colonial service. After an initial posting to Dubai, he was sent to Kampala and later to Lusaka, Zambia, where he served from 1976 to 1980. As the head of the MI6 station in Lusaka, then a hub for Rhodesian political resistance, Horrell established deep contacts with Rhodesian exile groups. His intelligence work and the trust he cultivated among competing factions were considered crucial to the success of the 1979 Lancaster House Agreement, which facilitated the transition to black majority rule in Zimbabwe.

=== Senior leadership ===
Upon returning to London, Horrell was placed in charge of MI6's African operations. He focused on stabilizing post-independence Zimbabwe, addressing military rule in Nigeria, and deepening the British government's relationship with the African National Congress (ANC) in South Africa. His colleagues credited him with supporting a more peaceful transition to majority rule in that country.

Horrell later served as the Director of Personnel and Administration for MI6. In this role, he was tasked by the government with modernizing the service's "buccaneering" culture, introducing greater accountability and a more self-critical ethos. His tenure coincided with the formal public acknowledgment of MI6's existence by the government and the subsequent establishment of parliamentary oversight via the Intelligence Services Act 1994.

=== Dismissal ===
Considered a favorite to lead MI6 as the successor of Colin McColl, Horrell instead resigned from the service in the early 1990s. His being passed over for promotion disappointed many of his colleagues.

In 2025, after his death, his friend James McManus revealed the reason for Horrell's sudden resignation: MI6 discovered that the married Horrell also had sex with men without disclosing this to his superiors, as MI6 policy then required. As a perceived blackmail risk, he was forced to resign and was not offered the comfortable civilian follow-up job that was customarily provided to retired senior intelligence officers.

== Personal life ==
Horrell was appointed an OBE in 1974 and a CMG in 1988. He married Patricia Binns in 1970, with whom he had a daughter and a son; the couple separated in 1975.

In retirement, despite suffering from failing eyesight and emphysema, he remained a prominent figure in the Reform Club and Garrick Club as a skilled bridge player. He died on 21 May 2021, aged 85.
