= David Rennie (columnist) =

British journalist (born 1971)

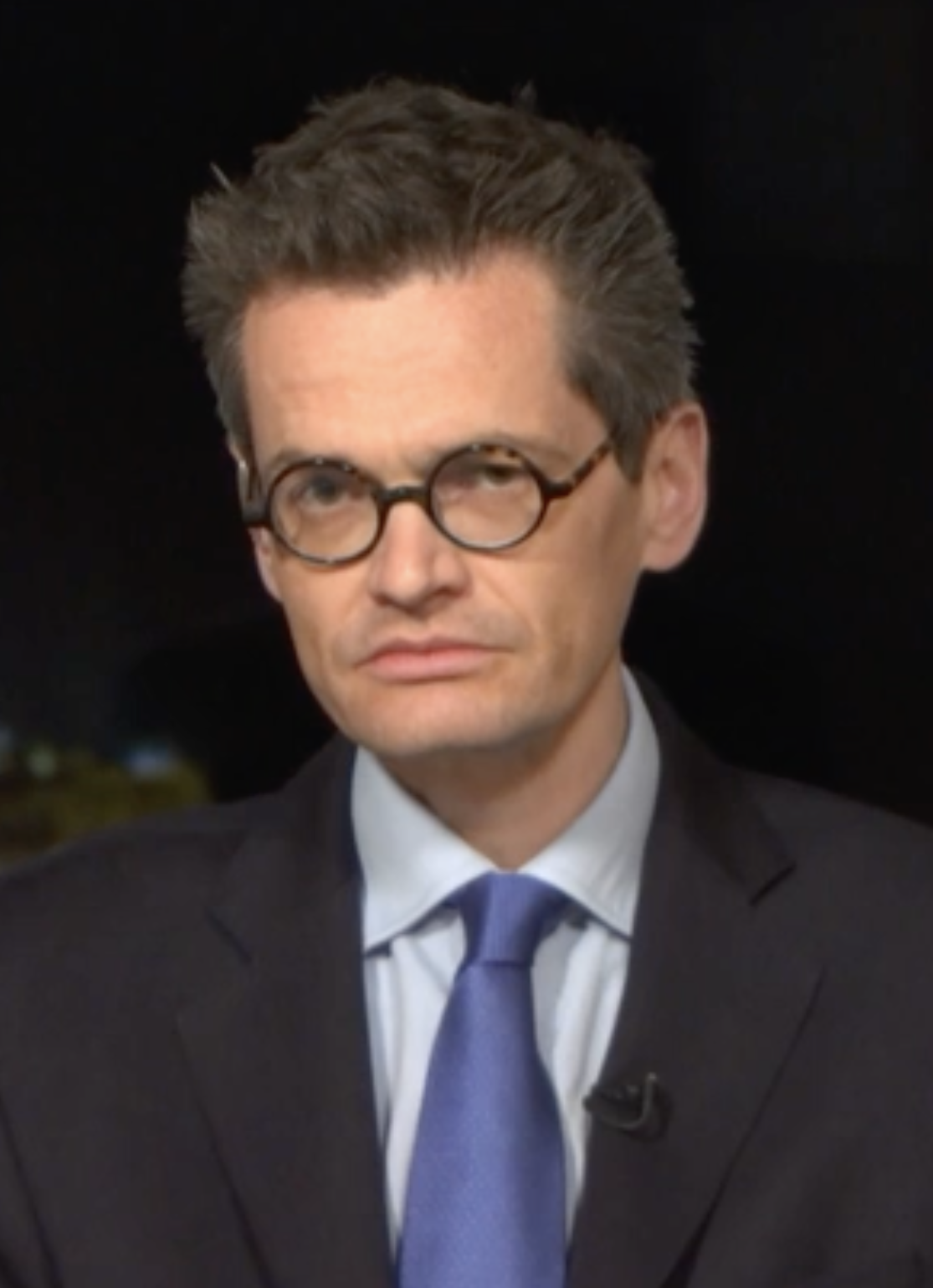
- Rennie in 2017
- Born: 1971 (age 54–55)
- Education: University of Cambridge
- Occupations: Journalist; columnist; foreign correspondent
- Employer: The Economist (2007–)

David Rennie (born 1971) is a British journalist. He is a columnist for The Economist, where until September 2017 he served as the Lexington columnist (Farewell Lexington column) and until 2024 as Beijing bureau chief and author of the Chaguan column on China. Currently he serves as The Economist's geopolitics editor. He is the son of Sir John Rennie, former 'C' (i.e., Director) of the Secret Intelligence Service (MI6).

== Career ==
David Rennie was educated at Westminster School and Gonville and Caius College, Cambridge, where he read English. He started his career at the Evening Standard, where he worked from 1992 until 1996. He then went to work for The Daily Telegraph in London, before joining their foreign staff, being posted to Sydney (1998), Beijing (1998–2002), Washington, D.C. (2002–2005), and Brussels (2005–2007). From 2006 until 2007 he was also a contributing editor at The Spectator.

Rennie joined The Economist in 2007, writing the Charlemagne column on EU affairs from Brussels, before moving to London, where he wrote the Bagehot column focusing on British politics from July 2010 to July 2012. In 2010, he received the UACES/Thomson Reuters "Reporting Europe" award. Following the death of Peter David in 2012 he moved to Washington, D.C., to serve as the magazine's Lexington columnist from 2012 to 2017. From 2013 to 2018 he was Washington bureau chief of The Economist. He moved to Beijing to take up a new posting as bureau chief in May 2018. He launched the Chaguan column in September 2018.

Rennie is a regular guest on 1A, produced by WAMU in Washington, D.C. and distributed nationally by NPR (National Public Radio). Since late 2022, he has been the co-presenter (alongside Alice Su) of The Economist podcast "Drum Tower", a weekly review of Chinese politics, culture, history and society.

Rennie won the 2023 Osborn Elliott Prize for Excellence in Journalism on Asia, awarded by the Asia Society, for his The Economist special report on China and the world order. The prize was shared with colleague Sue-Lin Wong of The Economist for her portrait of Xi Jinping in the podcast "The Prince".
