= SIS Building =

Government office building in London, England

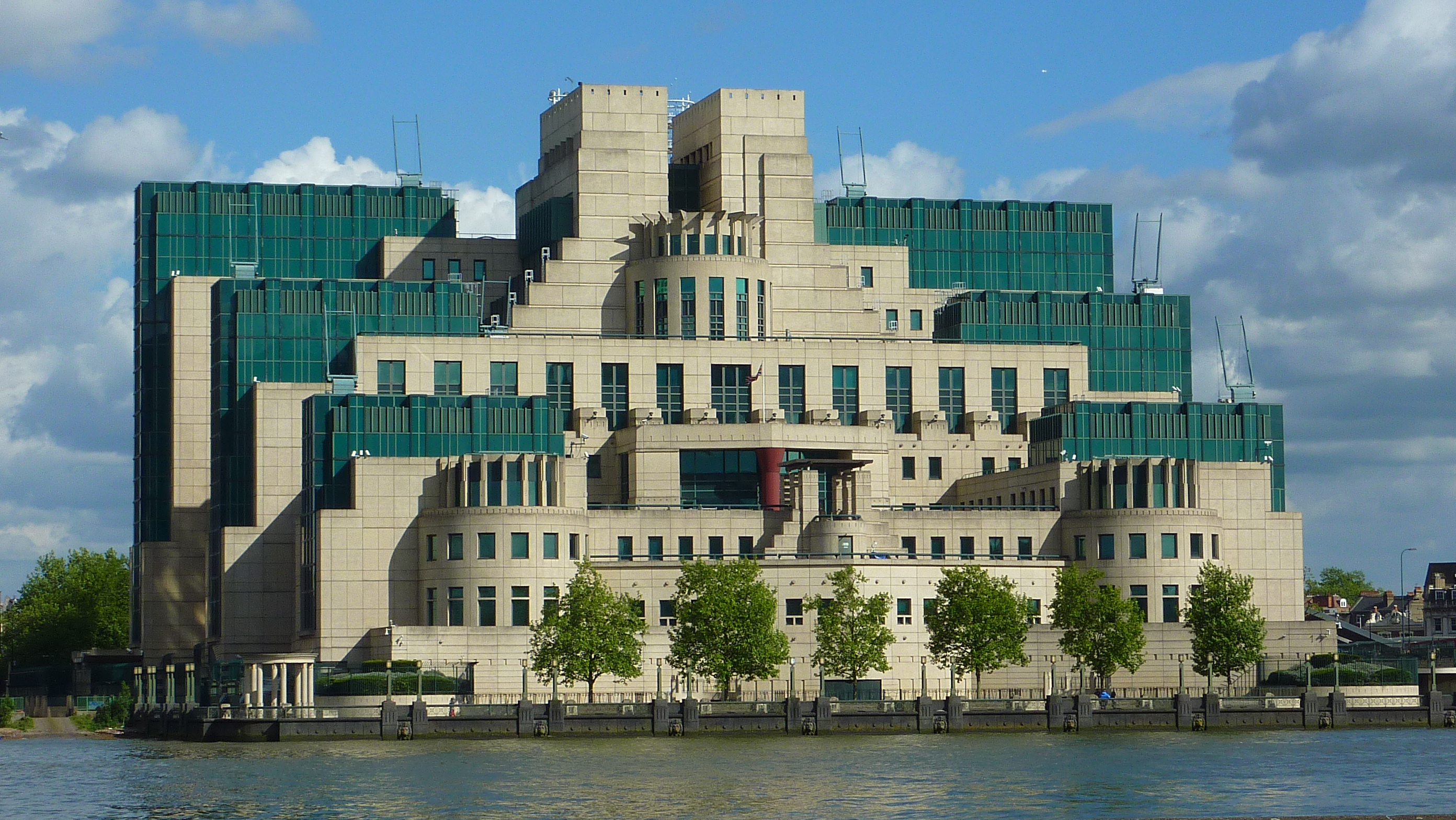
- SIS Building viewed from Millbank with the River Thames in the foreground
- Alternative names: MI6 Building; Legoland; Ceaușescu Towers; Babylon-on-Thames; Vauxhall Trollop; The Ziggurat

General information
- Architectural style: Postmodern
- Location: 85 Albert Embankment, Vauxhall, Lambeth, London, United Kingdom
- Coordinates: 51°29′14″N 00°07′27″W
- Completed: April 1994
- Inaugurated: 14 July 1994
- Client: Secret Intelligence Service (MI6)
- Owner: HM Government

Technical details
- Floor area: 252,497 square feet (23,457.7 m^{2})

Design and construction
- Architect: Terry Farrell and Partners
- Main contractor: John Laing plc

Other information
- Public transit: Vauxhall

The SIS Building, also called the MI6 Building, at Vauxhall Cross houses the headquarters of the Secret Intelligence Service (SIS), also known as Military Intelligence, Section 6 (MI6), the United Kingdom's foreign intelligence agency. It is located at 85 Albert Embankment in Vauxhall, London, on the south bank of the River Thames beside Vauxhall Bridge. The building has been the headquarters of the SIS since 1994.

== History ==
=== Background ===
Previously based at 54 Broadway, the SIS relocated to Century House, a 22-storey office block on Westminster Bridge Road, Lambeth, near Lambeth North and Waterloo stations, in 1964. Its location at Century House was classified information, though The Daily Telegraph reported that it was "London's worst-kept secret, known only to every taxi driver, tourist guide and KGB agent". Century House was described as "irredeemably insecure" in a 1985 National Audit Office (NAO) report with security concerns raised in a survey; the modernist building was made largely of glass, and had a petrol station at its base. Security concerns combined with the remaining short leasehold and cost of modernising the building were important factors in moving to a new headquarters.

=== Design and construction ===
The site on which the SIS building stands had been the location of the Vauxhall Pleasure Gardens in the 19th century. Several industrial buildings were subsequently built on the site after the demolition of the pleasure gardens in the 1850s, including a glass factory, a vinegar works and a gin distillery. Archeological excavation of the site during building found the remains of 17th-century glass kilns, as well as barge houses and an inn called The Vine. Evidence was also found for a river wall on the site.

In 1983 the site was bought by property developers Regalian Properties. A competition to develop the site was won by architect Terry Farrell, with an urban village as Farrell's original proposal. A scheme of office blocks was subsequently developed for the site, with a government agency as their occupier. The building had been sold for £130 million in 1989, with construction planned to take three years, built by John Laing. SIS ultimately became the occupiers of the building. Farrell's design for the building was influenced by 1930s industrial modernist architecture such as Bankside and Battersea Power Stations and Mayan and Aztec religious temples.

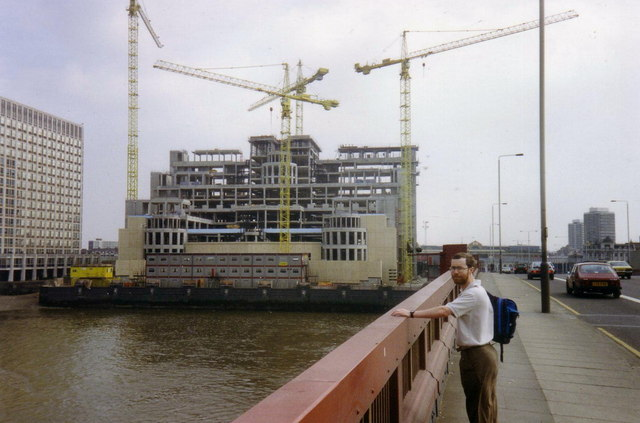
The SIS Building under construction during 1991

Regalian approached the government in 1987 to assess their interest in the proposed building. In 1988 Prime Minister Margaret Thatcher approved the purchase of the new building for the SIS. The NAO put the final cost at £135.05 million for site purchase and the basic building or £152.6 million including the service's special requirements.

The site is rumoured to include a tunnel under the Thames from the building to Whitehall.

The numerous layers over which the building is laid out create 60 separate roof areas. 25 different types of glass were used in the building, with 130,000 square feet (12,000 m^{2}) of glass and aluminium used in the building's construction. The windows in the SIS building are triple-glazed for security purposes. Due to the sensitive nature of MI6's work, large parts of the building are below street level, with numerous underground corridors serving the building. Amenities for staff include a sports hall, gymnasium, aerobics studio, a squash court and a restaurant. The building also features two moats for protection.

The building was completed in April 1994 and officially opened by Queen Elizabeth II accompanied by Prince Philip, Duke of Edinburgh, on 14 July 1994.

=== Recent history ===
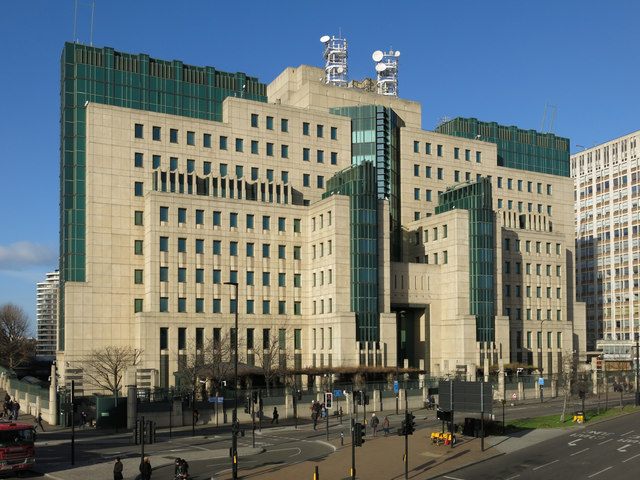
The Albert Embankment elevation during 2018

In September 2000, the building was attacked by unapprehended forces using a Russian-built RPG-22 anti-tank rocket, causing superficial damage. The Metropolitan Police recovered the discarded rocket launcher at Spring Gardens park in Vauxhall, as well as finding remains of the rocket which had exploded against an eighth floor window. Dissident Irish Republicans were believed to have been behind the attack. Writing in The Daily Telegraph after the attack, journalist Alan Judd referred to detractors who wished a less visible physical presence for SIS; writing that "Both sides of the Whitehall debate might now claim vindication by the rocket attack: on the one hand, the building's profile made it an obvious target; on the other, a headquarters with expensive security protection has been shown to be necessary."

On 1 June 2007, the building and its curtilage were designated as a protected site for the purposes of Section 128 of the Serious Organised Crime and Police Act 2005. The effect of the act was to make it a specific criminal offence for a person to trespass onto the site.

In August 2010, two men from North Wales were arrested after a parcel bomb was found at the SIS building's postal handling centre.

The Queen visited Vauxhall Cross for a second time in February 2006, and Charles, Prince of Wales visited in July 2008. In June 2013, Prince Harry visited Vauxhall Cross and was given a briefing on intelligence by staff. During the Thames Diamond Jubilee Pageant, part of the celebrations for the Diamond Jubilee of Elizabeth II in 2012, the London Philharmonic Orchestra played the "James Bond Theme" as they passed the building. The Daily Telegraph wrote that "Even MI6 managed to join the party – just. Its headquarters at Vauxhall sported a few discreet rows of bunting. But its balconies remained empty."

The building was lit with pink lights to raise awareness of breast cancer in 2013. In January 2013, the building was briefly put into a state of alert after the Vauxhall helicopter crash.

== Cultural influence ==
=== Architectural criticism ===
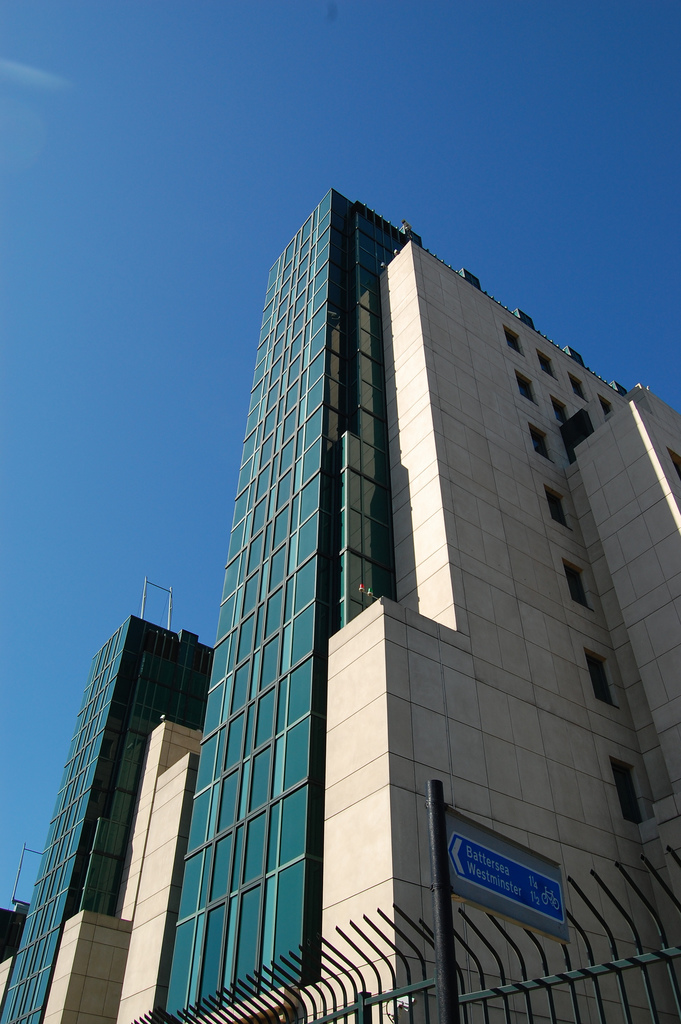
Detail of the Vauxhall Bridgefoot elevation

The SIS building was reviewed favourably by Deyan Sudjic in The Guardian in 1992; he described it as an "epitaph for the architecture of the eighties". Sudjic wrote that "It's a design which combines high seriousness in its classical composition with a possible unwitting sense of humour. The building could be interpreted equally plausibly as a Mayan temple or a piece of clanking art deco machinery", and added that the most impressive thing about Farrell's design was the way he had not "confined himself to a single idea" as the building "grows and develops as you move around it". In their 2014 Guide to London's Contemporary Architecture, Kenneth Allinson and Victoria Thornton wrote:

Some see this building as Farrell's most controlled and mature building – a rich diet, certainly, but not a cacophony of rhetorical features, nor without the unselfconscious virtuosity which can uplift and excite. But it is undoubtedly too Gotham City for the taste of many. Farrell's many critics and opponents ... would call it a nightmare: a secret service fortress, provided by a private speculator, designed by an avowed populist, and sited on a most prominent river location. Indubitably, it is a bizarre phenomenon.

Feargus O'Sullivan on the other hand mentioned the nickname "Ceaușescu Towers" for the building, referring to the architecture of Socialist Romania, and derided the whole neighbourhood of newly constructed buildings in Vauxhall as "Dubai-on-Thames".

=== James Bond films ===
Vauxhall Cross has featured in a number James Bond films, where it is depicted as the home base of the fictional 00 Section and its associated Q Branch. The building was first featured in GoldenEye (1995), and was depicted as having been attacked in The World Is Not Enough (1999), Skyfall (2012), and Spectre (2015). For Skyfall, a 50-foot-high (15-metre) model of the building was constructed at Pinewood Studios. A special premiere of Skyfall was held at Vauxhall Cross for MI6 staff, who cheered when their headquarters was attacked in the film. Some filming for Spectre took place on the Thames near Vauxhall Cross in May 2015, with the fictional controlled demolition of the building playing a key role in the finale sequence of the film.

== See also ==
- Thames House – the headquarters of MI5, the British domestic intelligence agency
- The Doughnut – the headquarters of the Government Communications Headquarters (GCHQ), the British signals intelligence and cybersecurity agency
