= David Rennie =

David Rennie may refer to:

- David Rennie (columnist) (born 1971), British columnist
- David Rennie (film editor), American film editor
- David Rennie (footballer) (born 1964), Scottish footballer
- Dave Rennie (born 1963), New Zealand Rugby Union player and coach
