= General Davidson =

General Davidson may refer to:

- Francis Davidson (1892–1973), British Army major general
- Garrison H. Davidson (1904–1992), U.S. Army lieutenant general
- Henry Brevard Davidson (1831–1899), Confederate States Army brigadier general
- John Davidson (British Army officer) (1876–1954), British Army major general
- John Wynn Davidson (1825–1881), Union Army brigadier general and brevet major general
- Matthew Wolfe Davidson (fl. 1990s–2020s), U.S. Air Force major general
- Phillip Davidson (1915–1996), U.S. Army lieutenant general
- William Lee Davidson (1746–1781), North Carolina Militia brigadier general pro tempore in the American Revolutionary War
