= Maurice Oldfield =

British intelligence officer (1915–1981)

Sir Maurice Oldfield GCMG CBE

7th Chief of the Secret Intelligence Service
- In office 1973–1978
- Prime Minister: Edward Heath; Harold Wilson; James Callaghan
- Preceded by: Sir John Rennie
- Succeeded by: Sir Dick Franks

Personal details
- Born: 16 November 1915 Meadow Place Farm, Youlgreave, Derbyshire, England
- Died: 11 March 1981 (aged 65) London, England
- Education: University of Manchester
- Occupation: Intelligence officer
- Awards: Knight Grand Cross of the Order of St Michael and St George; Commander of the Order of the British Empire

Military service
- Allegiance: United Kingdom
- Branch/service: British Army
- Rank: Major
- Unit: Intelligence Corps
- Battles/wars: Second World War

Sir Maurice Oldfield GCMG CBE (16 November 1915 – 11 March 1981) was a British intelligence officer and espionage administrator. He served as the seventh director of the Secret Intelligence Service (MI6), from 1973 to 1978.

== Early life ==
Oldfield was born on 16 November 1915 at his grandmother's farm just outside Youlgrave, a village in Derbyshire. He grew up at a house called Mona View in Over Haddon and was the first of 11 children of Joseph Oldfield, a tenant farmer, and his wife, Ada Annie Dicken.

He was educated at Lady Manners School in the nearby market town of Bakewell, before winning a scholarship to the Victoria University of Manchester, where he stayed at Hulme Hall. There, he studied under the historian A. J. P. Taylor and specialised in medieval history. He graduated with a first-class degree and was elected to a fellowship.

== Intelligence career ==
During the Second World War, Oldfield joined the British Army. Initially a sergeant in Army Field Security (which was absorbed into the Intelligence Corps in 1940), he was commissioned as a second lieutenant in the Intelligence Corps in July 1943. Most of his wartime service was in Egypt at the headquarters of SIME (Security Intelligence Middle East) in Cairo. This was primarily a counter-intelligence organisation, the role of which was to detect hostile agents in the region and counter their activities.

By the end of the war, Oldfield had been promoted to major. In 1946, he was awarded an MBE.

After the war, Oldfield joined the Secret Intelligence Service (SIS), commonly known as MI6. From 1947 to 1949, he was deputy to Brigadier Douglas Roberts, the head of counter-intelligence, with whom he had served in Egypt during the war. After two postings to Singapore (the first as deputy head, the second as head of the SIS regional headquarters) he was appointed a CBE. From 1959, he spent four years as the SIS representative in Washington, D.C. This was a key post, important for the maintenance of good relations between the SIS and the Central Intelligence Agency. On his return, he became director of counter-intelligence and deputy to the Chief of the Secret Intelligence Service Sir Dick White. Oldfield was passed over for promotion when Sir John Rennie succeeded White in 1968. He eventually became director when Rennie resigned in 1973; he held this post until his retirement in 1978.

== Retirement ==
After retiring from MI6, Oldfield was a visiting fellow at All Souls College, Oxford, until 1979. Oldfield lived at Marsham Court, an apartment building in Millbank in the City of Westminster from the early 1970s until his death in 1981. A large explosive device was discovered by officers from Special Branch hanging on railings outside Marsham Court on 13 October 1975. The bomb was near Lockett's restaurant which was directly under Oldfield's flat.

In 1979 the new prime minister, Margaret Thatcher, asked Oldfield to coordinate security and intelligence in Northern Ireland.

After his retirement as Chief of the SIS, it emerged that Oldfield was homosexual, resulting in his security clearance being withdrawn shortly before his death in 1981.

Oldfield died in March 1981, aged 65. He is buried next to his parents and sister in St Anne's churchyard, Over Haddon, Derbyshire.

== Legacy ==
Oldfield was reputedly one of the models for John le Carré's fictional character George Smiley, though Le Carré denied this. In his memoir The Pigeon Tunnel: Stories from My Life Le Carré describes a lunchtime meeting between Oldfield, himself and Alec Guinness; this was intended to provide the actor with a sense of the manner and appearance of an "old spy in retirement".

In October 2012, it was reported by the BBC's current affairs programme Panorama, that he had been linked to the Elm Guest House child abuse scandal, supposedly involving senior MPs and security personnel, by the Operation Midland investigation, and a Metropolitan Police informant. The investigation ended without charges, and in 2017 Oldfield was cleared of all allegations of child abuse at Elm Guest House and elsewhere. The accuser in the Operation Midland case, Carl Beech, was subsequently convicted of making up the allegations in 2019.

Government offices
Preceded by Sir John Rennie	Chief of the SIS; 1973–1978	Succeeded by Sir Dick Franks
