= Dick Franks =

British Intelligence chief

Sir Dick Franks KCMG

8th Chief of the Secret Intelligence Service
- In office 1979–1982
- Preceded by: Maurice Oldfield
- Succeeded by: Colin Figures

Personal details
- Born: Arthur Temple Franks; 13 July 1920 Hampstead, London, England
- Died: 12 October 2008 (aged 88) Aldeburgh, Suffolk, England
- Spouse: Rachel Ward
- Children: One son, two daughters
- Education: Queen's College, Oxford
- Occupation: Intelligence officer
- Awards: KCMG

Military service
- Allegiance: United Kingdom
- Branch/service: Royal Corps of Signals; Special Operations Executive; Secret Intelligence Service (SIS/MI6)
- Rank: Chief of the Secret Intelligence Service
- Battles/wars: World War II; Cold War; Operation Boot

Sir Arthur Temple "Dick" Franks KCMG (13 July 1920 – 12 October 2008) was Head of the British Secret Intelligence Service from 1979 to 1982.

== Career ==
Educated at Rugby School and Queen's College, Oxford, Franks was commissioned into the Royal Corps of Signals in 1940. He became an Intelligence officer in the Western Desert and then joined the Special Operations Executive.

He started his career by "earning a reputation for daring military exploits against Nazi Germany before pursuing a fruitful career on Her Majesty’s secret service."

After the end of the Second World War he briefly worked for the Daily Mirror before joining the Secret Intelligence Service in 1946. He became involved in Operation Boot, a plan to overthrow Mohammad Mosaddegh, the nationalistic Iranian Prime Minister in 1953. He was posted to Bonn in 1962 and was promoted to Deputy Chief in 1977. He was appointed Chief of the Service in 1978, in place of Brian Stewart, the Director of Support Services.

As Chief, Franks was forced to contend with budget cuts, which he accepted for fear that SIS would otherwise be merged with the Security Service. One of the consequences of these cuts was the virtual closure of the MI6 station in Tehran – and the sole remaining officer was forbidden from operating out of the British Embassy by Ambassador Anthony Parsons – forcing him to instead rent a flat and depend on briefs delivered by SAVAK.

== Personal ==
He lived at Aldeburgh in Suffolk. Franks was a member of the Travellers Club and still made regular visits into the last years of his life, often reminiscing with old colleagues from the intelligence world.

He was nicknamed "Dick" and "Dickie".

Sir Colin McColl, former head of MI6, said: “He [Franks] was extremely effective yet also sensitive, intelligent and a most delightful man.”

Government offices
Preceded by Sir Maurice Oldfield	Chief of the SIS; 1979–1982	Succeeded by Sir Colin Figures
