= Michael Pakenham =

British diplomat (born 1943)

The Honourable Sir Michael Pakenham KBE CMG

Ambassador of the United Kingdom to Poland
- In office 2001–2003
- Preceded by: John Malcolm Macgregor
- Succeeded by: Charles Crawford

Ambassador of the United Kingdom to Luxembourg
- In office 1991–1994
- Preceded by: Juliet Campbell
- Succeeded by: Nick Elam

Personal details
- Born: Michael Aidan Pakenham; 3 November 1943 (age 82)
- Citizenship: United Kingdom
- Spouse: Mimi Lavine
- Children: 2
- Parent(s): Frank Pakenham, 7th Earl of Longford and Elizabeth Harman
- Education: Ampleforth College
- Alma mater: Trinity College, Cambridge

Sir Michael Aidan Pakenham KBE CMG (born 3 November 1943) is a British retired diplomat.

== Background and education ==
Pakenham is the third son of Labour politician Frank Pakenham, 7th Earl of Longford, and Elizabeth Harman. He is the brother of Thomas Pakenham, Lady Antonia Fraser and Lady Rachel Billington. He was educated at Ampleforth College and Trinity College, Cambridge, and was an exchange fellow at Rice University.

== Career ==
Pakenham was briefly a reporter for the Washington Post before joining the Foreign Office in 1965. He served in Nairobi and Warsaw before being seconded to the Cabinet Office 1971–74 as Assistant Private Secretary, then Private Secretary, to the Chancellor of the Duchy of Lancaster (Geoffrey Rippon then John Davies), who at that time had special responsibilities for the co-ordination of British policy towards the European Communities.

In 1974 Pakenham was at the CSCE in Geneva, then was posted to New Delhi 1974–78 and Washington, D.C. 1978–1983. He was Head of the Arms Control and Disarmament Department at the Foreign and Commonwealth Office 1983–87; Counsellor (External Relations) to the UK Permanent Representative to the European Community, Brussels, 1987–91; Ambassador and Consul-General to Luxembourg 1991–94; and Minister in Paris 1994–97.

Pakenham was then seconded to the Cabinet Office again as Deputy Secretary for Defence and Overseas Affairs 1997–99, then Chairman of the Joint Intelligence Committee 1997–2000 (also Intelligence Co-ordinator 1999–2000). Finally, he was posted to Warsaw as Ambassador to Poland 2001–03. Pakenham was appointed a Companion of the Order of St Michael and St George (CMG) in 1993 and a Knight Commander of the Order of the British Empire (KBE) in the Queen's Birthday Honours in 2003. He was made a Freeman of the City of London in 1992.

Since retiring from the Diplomatic Service, Pakenham has been chairman of Pakenvest International; senior adviser to Access Industries; non-executive director of the Westminster Group; a trustee of Chevening House; and a lay member of the governing Council of King's College London (and its vice-chairman since 2009).

== Personal life ==
Pakenham married Mimi Lavine (born Meta Doak) in 1980; they have two daughters.
