= David Spedding =

UK chief of intelligence service (1943–2001)

Sir David Spedding KCMG CVO OBE

12th Chief of the Secret Intelligence Service
- In office 1994–1999
- Preceded by: Colin McColl
- Succeeded by: Richard Dearlove

Personal details
- Born: 7 March 1943
- Died: 13 June 2001 (aged 58) London, United Kingdom
- Spouse: Gillian Kinnear
- Children: Two sons
- Education: Sherborne School
- Alma mater: Hertford College, Oxford
- Occupation: Intelligence officer
- Awards: KCMG, CVO, OBE

Sir David Rolland Spedding KCMG CVO OBE (7 March 1943 – 13 June 2001) was Chief of the British Secret Intelligence Service (MI6) from 1994 to 1999.

== Early life ==
David Spedding was the son of a Border Regiment lieutenant colonel, and grew up in the middle class. He was initially educated at Sherborne School, then studied history at Hertford College, Oxford.

== Career ==
Spedding joined the Secret Intelligence Service in 1967, while a postgraduate student at Oxford. He then attended the Middle East Center for Arabic Studies in Beirut, becoming a specialist on Middle East affairs. He also served in Santiago and Abu Dhabi.

In 1971 Spedding was named as the local SIS station commander in Lebanon, and was later posted to Abu Dhabi in 1977. Following his Middle East Directorate appointment in 1983, he was made the Amman Jordan station head, and was subsequently commended in that position for uncovering an Abu Nidal plan to assassinate the Queen during an upcoming Jordan visit. For this he was made Commander of the Royal Victorian Order.

In 1993, Spedding became Director of Requirements and Operations. In 1994 he became Chief of the Service, becoming the first chief to have never served in the armed forces, and the youngest to have held the position to that date. During his tenure the SIS faced some degree of negative publicity due to unauthorized disclosures in the wake of Richard Tomlinson's dismissal.

Spedding died of lung cancer on 13 June 2001, aged 58.

Government offices
Preceded by Sir Colin McColl	Chief of the SIS; 1994–1999	Succeeded by Sir Richard Dearlove
