= John Sinclair (British Army officer) =

British Army general

Major-General Sir John Sinclair KCMG CB OBE
- Sinclair in 1944

4th Chief of the Secret Intelligence Service
- In office 1953–1956
- Preceded by: Stewart Menzies
- Succeeded by: Dick White

Director of Military Intelligence
- In office 1944–1945
- Preceded by: Francis Davidson
- Succeeded by: Freddie de Guingand

Personal details
- Born: 29 May 1897 Fulham, London
- Died: 22 March 1977 (aged 79) Funtington, West Sussex
- Occupation: Intelligence officer
- Awards: KCMG, CB, OBE, Commander of the Legion of Merit, Commander of the Order of the Crown

Military service
- Allegiance: United Kingdom
- Branch/service: Royal Navy; British Army; Secret Intelligence Service (SIS/MI6)
- Rank: Major-General; Chief of the Secret Intelligence Service

Sir John Alexander Sinclair, KCMG, CB, OBE (29 May 1897 – 22 March 1977) was a British Army general who was head of the Secret Intelligence Service (SIS) from 1953 to 1956.

== Career ==
Sinclair was the second son of a Church of England priest, John Sinclair. He was educated at West Downs School, Winchester, and the Naval Colleges at Osborne and Dartmouth. He served in the Royal Navy during World War I but had to leave the Navy due to ill health. At the end of the war he transferred to the army and after training at Royal Military Academy, Woolwich, was commissioned into the Royal Field Artillery. In 1938 he was appointed an instructor at the Staff College, Camberley. By 1941 he was Deputy Director of Operations at the War Office and then in 1942 he became Commander Royal Artillery for 1st Division. In 1944 he was appointed Director of Military Intelligence at the War Office. In 1946, while still in the army, he started working for the SIS.

Following his retirement from the military in 1952 as a Major-General, Sinclair was appointed head of the SIS, taking up the post in 1953. He led the Service through the transition from its wartime operations, directing operations in the emerging Cold War environment in a "practical and responsible fashion", "instead of accommodating the risk-takers". He also introduced reforms to recruitment and conditions of service designed to introduce a professional career structure within SIS suited to post-war conditions. His personal integrity was recognised not just by colleagues, but also by opponents.

Sir John's retirement coincided with a failed frogman mission to investigate the Sverdlov-class cruiser Ordzhonikidze that had brought the leader of the Soviet Union, Nikita Khrushchev, and Prime Minister Nikolai Bulganin on a diplomatic mission to Britain, resulting in the death of frogman Lionel Crabb. The Prime Minister had not approved this mission and some accounts incorrectly claimed that Sir John had been forced to resign. The "Authorized History of MI5" confirms that the decision that the head of that service should succeed Sir John at his planned retirement date in 1956 had been taken by the Prime Minister in 1954.

== Bibliography ==
- Smart, Nick (2005). Biographical Dictionary of British Generals of the Second World War. Barnsley: Pen and Sword Books. ISBN 1844150496.
- SINCLAIR, Maj.-Gen. Sir John, Who Was Who, A & C Black, 1920–2016 (online edition, Oxford University Press, 2014)

Military offices
| Preceded by Francis Davidson | Director of Military Intelligence; 1944–1945 | Succeeded by Freddie de Guingand |
Government offices
| Preceded by Sir Stewart Menzies | Chief of the SIS; 1953–1956 | Succeeded by Sir Dick White |
