= John Rennie (MI6 officer) =

6th Director of the Secret Intelligence Service

Sir John Rennie KCMG

6th Chief of the Secret Intelligence Service
- In office 1968–1973
- Preceded by: Dick White
- Succeeded by: Maurice Oldfield

Personal details
- Born: 13 January 1914 Marylebone, England
- Died: 30 September 1981 (aged 67) Lambeth, England
- Spouse: Jennifer Margaret Wainwright
- Children: David Rennie, Charles Rennie
- Education: Balliol College, Oxford
- Occupation: Intelligence officer
- Awards: KCMG

Sir John Ogilvy Rennie, KCMG (13 January 1914 – 30 September 1981) was the 6th Director of the Secret Intelligence Service (MI6) from 1968 to 1973. He was once the head of the Information Research Department (IRD), a secret branch of the UK Foreign Office dedicated to pro-colonial and anti-communist propaganda during the Cold War.

== Career ==
Educated at Wellington College and Balliol College, Oxford, Rennie joined an advertising agency in New York City in 1935. During World War II he worked at an organisation in Baltimore combating German propaganda.

In 1946 he joined the Foreign Office and was posted to Washington, D.C., and then to Warsaw. In 1953 he was appointed Head of the Information Research Department, a controversial body established to disseminate information about the dangers of Soviet-style communism. During the Suez Crisis he chaired a committee established to disseminate British propaganda in the Middle East. He was posted to Buenos Aires in 1958 and Washington, D.C., in 1960. He served on the Civil Service Commission in 1966; in 1968 he was appointed Chief of the Secret Intelligence Service.

On 15 January 1973, Rennie's son Charles Tatham Ogilvy Rennie, and his daughter-in-law were arrested for an alleged involvement in the importation of large quantities of heroin from Hong Kong. Rennie resigned not long afterwards.

He was made a Knight Commander of the Order of St Michael and St George in 1967.

Government offices
Preceded by Sir Dick White	Chief of the SIS; 1968–1973	Succeeded by Sir Maurice Oldfield
