= Century House, London =

Coordinates: 51.49873°N 0.11016°W

Century House
- Century House as it appeared circa 1994–2001, after being vacated by SIS but before conversion to apartments
- Interactive map of the Century House area

General information
- Location: Lambeth, London
- Construction started: 1959
- Completed: 1964

Technical details
- Floor count: 22

Century House is a 22-storey building located at 100 Westminster Bridge Road in London. The building was designed in the modern style and constructed between 1959 and 1964. It became the home of the Secret Intelligence Service following their move from 54 Broadway in 1964. Though the location of their Broadway headquarters was classified information, The Daily Telegraph reported that it was "London's worst-kept secret, known only to every taxi driver, tourist guide and KGB agent".

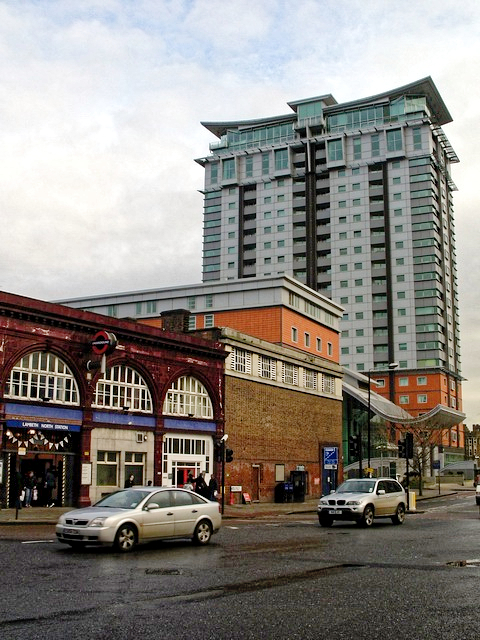
The Perspective Building, formerly Century House, in 2006, after being converted to an apartment block

After 21 years in service as the headquarters of SIS, Century House was regarded as unsuitable after several security concerns were raised. The SIS subsequently moved its headquarters to a new building at Vauxhall Cross in 1994, after which Century House was acquired by a developer, renamed the Perspective Building, and converted into an apartment block to a design by Assael Architecture. The conversion work was completed in 2003.
