= Dick White =

British intelligence officer (1906–1993)

Sir Dick White KCMG, KBE
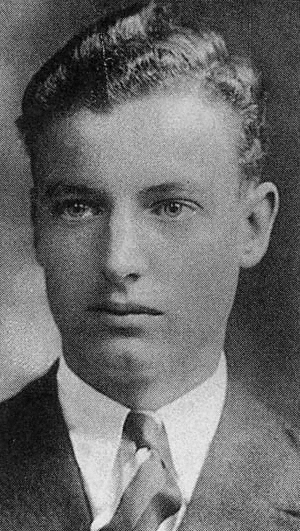
- White in 1928

5th Director General of MI5
- In office 1953–1956
- Preceded by: Percy Sillitoe
- Succeeded by: Roger Hollis

5th Chief of the Secret Intelligence Service
- In office 1956–1968
- Preceded by: John Sinclair
- Succeeded by: John Rennie

Intelligence Co-ordinator, Cabinet office
- In office 1968–1972
- Succeeded by: Peter Wilkinson

Personal details
- Born: 20 December 1906 Tonbridge, Kent
- Died: 21 February 1993 (aged 86) Burpham, Sussex
- Occupation: Intelligence officer
- Awards: KCMG, KBE

Sir Dick Goldsmith White, KCMG, KBE (20 December 1906 – 21 February 1993) was a British intelligence officer. He was Director General (DG) of MI5 from 1953 to 1956, and Head of the Secret Intelligence Service (MI6) from 1956 to 1968.

== Early life ==
White was born in Tonbridge, Kent, the son of an ironmonger Percy Hall White and Gertrude Farthing and went to school at Bishop's Stortford College. He took a first class degree in History at Christ Church, Oxford, in 1927, and learnt to speak German. He was athletic in his youth and obtained a blue in running at Oxford. He was described by Peter Wright as resembling David Niven: "the same perfect English manners, easy charm, and immaculate dress sense." He was, said Wright, "tall with lean, healthy features and a sharp eye".

He would qualify for a Commonwealth Fellowship in 1928 which saw him seek further education in the United States at the Universities of Michigan and California. After returning to the UK, he failed to obtain a position at Christ Church, and after being rejected by the Navy, he obtained work in Croydon as a teacher. He was spotted by a recruiter in 1935 while on Mediterranean cruise with his students and invited to an interview with Guy Liddell at MI5.

== Career ==
He was employed at MI5 in 1936 to monitor the rise of Nazism in Germany and spent a year in Munich attempting to recruit Germans. When back from Germany, he worked with Jona Ustinov to identify potential recruits. He was a co-creator of the Double-Cross system in 1940, to turn Abwehr agents in the UK and elsewhere. He would eventually become Liddell's assistant director in B Division. By 1943, he was seconded to SHAEF as a special advisor on counter-intelligence ending the war as a brigadier. He was sent to Berlin at the end of the war to investigate Hitler's fate.

He returned to MI5 in 1947 as head of its counter-intelligence division. In 1949, he was warned by the FBI of a Soviet spy at Harwell, the UK's Atomic Energy Research Establishment. Investigation identified Klaus Fuchs who was later interrogated and confessed to being a spy for the Soviets. White and MI5 were still in denial of the state of the Soviet penetration until the FBI discovered a spy via the Venona project called "Homer" working in British government. Kim Philby would warn the KGB in 1951, that Donald Maclean, now in the UK, had been identified as "Homer" and Guy Burgess was sent to warn him. White attempted to track the latter two to France but they had escaped. Their arrival in Moscow compromised Philby's position. Under a cloud of suspicion raised by his highly visible and intimate association with Burgess, Philby returned to London. There, he underwent MI5 interrogation by White aimed at ascertaining whether he had acted as a "third man" in Burgess and Maclean's spy ring. In July 1951, Philby resigned from MI6, preempting his all-but-inevitable dismissal. Philby was cleared a few years later by Harold Macmillan.

By 1953, White was appointed as director-general of MI5 and in 1956 was appointed Chief of the Secret Intelligence Service in 1956 in the wake of the "Crabb Affair", the exposure of which had damaged Soviet–British relations and embarrassed MI6 and clashed with Anthony Eden and Macmillan over their handling of the Suez Crisis. Much as Peter Wright liked White, he felt his move to MI6 was a mistake for both MI5 and MI6: "Just as his work [at MI5] was beginning, he was moved on a politician's whim to an organisation he knew little about, and which was profoundly hostile to his arrival. He was never to be as successful there as he had been in MI5." During his tenure at MI6, he rebuilt the organisation's relationship with Whitehall and the CIA. This was especially true when MI6 recruited Oleg Penkovsky, a GRU Colonel that led to the identification of MI6 officer George Blake in 1963 as Soviet spy.

White had always suspected Kim Philby of being the "third man". When he found out that Philby had been employed as freelance MI6 agent in Beirut, he sent Nicholas Elliott to interrogate Philby and encourage him to return to London. Philby fled to Moscow. By 1964, he was aware of the "Fourth Man" when Anthony Blunt confessed his knowledge of the other three spies for immunity.

At the time, the identity of all MI5 and MI6 personnel was kept secret; officially, the government did not even admit to their existence. White's role as head of MI6 came out in 1967, when he was identified by the Saturday Evening Post magazine. White would retire in 1968 and became the Cabinet Office's first Intelligence Co-ordinator before retiring for good in 1972.

== Marriage ==
In 1945, he married Kathleen Bellamy and they had four children, Adrian, Frances, Jenny and Stephen.

== Honours ==
Honoured many times throughout his career, he was appointed OBE in 1942, CBE in 1950, KBE in 1955, and finally KCMG in 1960. Other honours included a Legion of Merit and a Croix de Guerre.

== Death ==
After a long illness he died from intestinal cancer at his home, "The Leat" in Burpham, near Arundel in Sussex, on 21 February 1993; his wife, Kathleen, survived him.

Government offices
Preceded by Sir Percy Sillitoe	Director General of MI5; 1953–1956	Succeeded by Sir Roger Hollis
Preceded by Sir John Sinclair	Chief of the SIS; 1956–1968	Succeeded by Sir John Rennie
Preceded by New post	Intelligence Co-ordinator, Cabinet Office; 1968–1972	Succeeded by Sir Peter Wilkinson
