= 54 Broadway =

Office building in Broadway, London

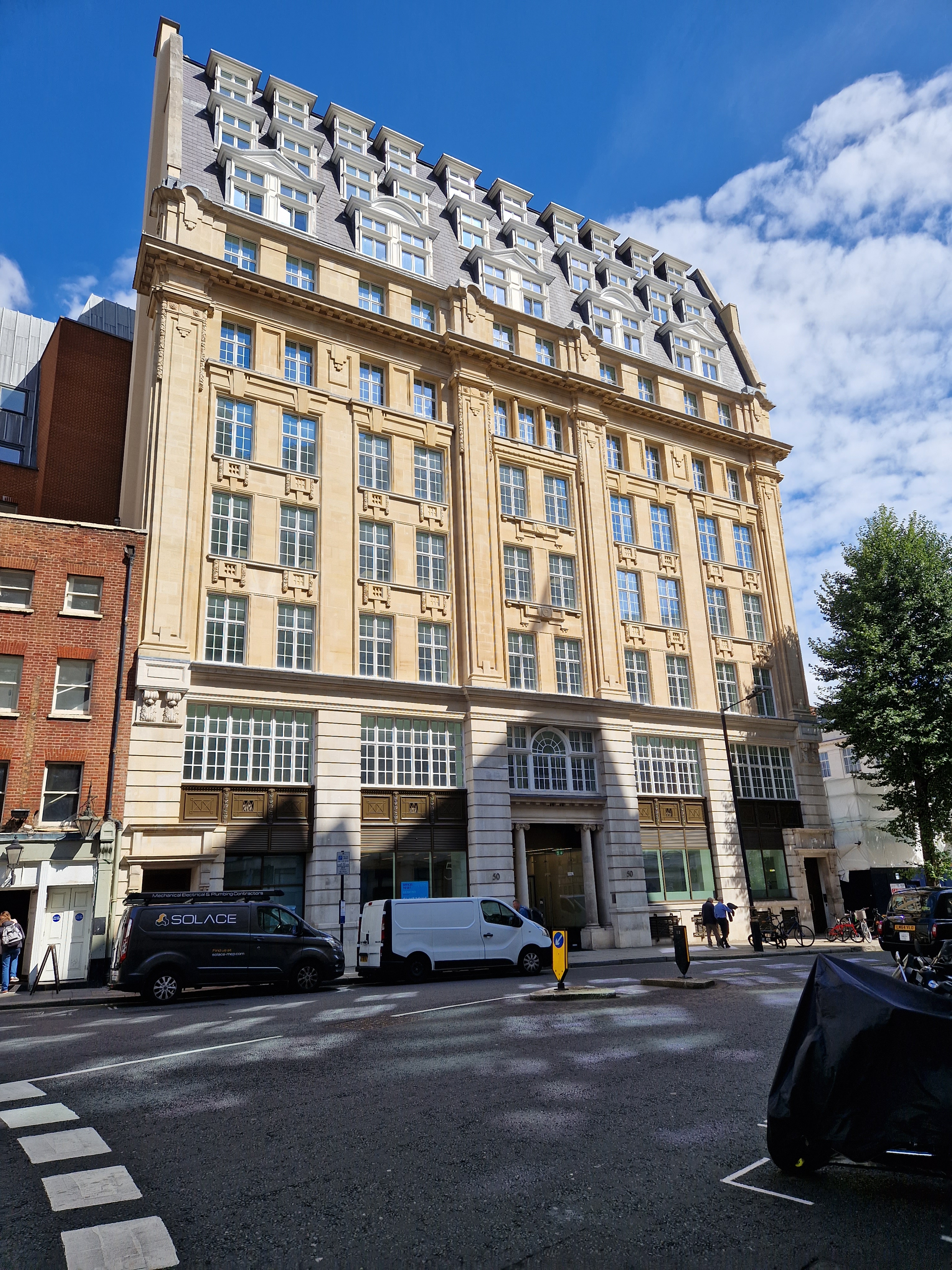
- Broadway Buildings
- Interactive map of the 54 Broadway area

General information
- Location: Westminster, London
- Coordinates: 51.49989°N 0.13347°W
- Completed: 1924

Technical details
- Floor count: 9

54 Broadway, sometimes known as Broadway Buildings (now renumbered 50 Broadway), is an office building in Broadway, London.

== History ==
The building, which has a prominent mansard roof, was completed around 1924, when it became the main operating base for the Secret Intelligence Service. (Note: SIS had previously been based at 2 Whitehall Court.) In 1925, the Government Code and Cypher School co-located within the building, although it was on a different floor to the Secret Intelligence Service. (Note: GC&CS had previously been based at Watergate House, York Buildings, Adelphi.) GC&CS moved out to Bletchley Park in August 1939.

During the Second World War it had a brass plaque identifying it as the offices of the "Minimax Fire Extinguisher Company". Sir Stewart Menzies, Chief of the Secret Intelligence Service, had access to a tunnel, which connected 54 Broadway to his private residence in Queen Anne's Gate. Kim Philby, who worked in the building during the war, described it as "a dingy building, a warren of wooden partitions and frosted glass windows...served by an ancient lift."

The Secret Intelligence Service moved out to Century House in 1964. During the 1990s, the building was used by the project team for the Jubilee Line Extension to the London Underground.
