= Chief of the Secret Intelligence Service =

British intelligence post

Chief of the Secret Intelligence Service (MI6)
- Incumbent; Blaise Metreweli since 1 October 2025; 11 months ago
- Secret Intelligence Service
- Abbreviation: C
- Reports to: Foreign Secretary
- Appointer: Foreign Secretary
- Constituting instrument: Intelligence Services Act 1994
- Formation: 1909; 117 years ago
- First holder: Captain Sir Mansfield Smith-Cumming
- Unofficial names: Chief of MI6, 'C'
- Website: sis.gov.uk

The chief of the Secret Intelligence Service serves as the head of the Secret Intelligence Service (SIS, also commonly known as MI6), which is part of the United Kingdom intelligence community. The chief is appointed by the foreign secretary, to whom they report directly. Annual reports are also made to the prime minister.

The chief of the Secret Intelligence Service typically signs letters with a "C" in green ink. This originates from the initial used by Captain Sir Mansfield Smith-Cumming, when he signed a letter "C" in green ink. Since then the chief has been known as "C".

== History ==
From 1782 until 1909, British intelligence at the government level was handled directly by the Foreign Office, with the Army and Navy also maintaining their own intelligence branches. By 1909, growing tensions with Germany led the Committee of Imperial Defence to recommend the creation of the Secret Service Bureau to provide organization and leadership to the intelligence-gathering process as well as a layer of insulation from espionage activities for the Foreign Office. A 10 August 1909 letter from the Director of Naval Intelligence, Alexander Bethell, to then-Commander Mansfield Smith-Cumming offered him a "new billet": the opportunity to head the Foreign Section of the new Secret Service Bureau. Cumming was to begin in this role on 1 October 1909, but bureaucratic and funding obstacles delayed the start of his work. His first full day in this capacity was not until 7 October, and even then, he "went to the office and remained all day, but saw no one, nor was there anything to do there."

Cumming's tenure as chief established many of the traditions and trappings of the office. Among the best known of these, he signed documents with the initial "C" in green ink, a custom upheld throughout the history of the service. One tradition that was not maintained was the selection of the Chief from the ranks of the Royal Navy. Although Cumming and his successor Hugh Sinclair both had long Navy careers, in 1939 Army veteran Stewart Menzies was appointed over naval officer (and Churchill's preferred candidate) Gerard Muirhead-Gould. Plans to rotate the selection of Chief among the various branches of military service were considered, but most subsequent Chiefs have been career intelligence officers.

Although the existence of the Secret Intelligence Service, much less its Chief, was not officially acknowledged until 1992, the role's reality was an open secret for many years. In 1932, Compton MacKenzie was fined under the Official Secrets Act for elements of his book Greek Memories. Among these offences, according to Attorney General Sir Thomas Inskip was "reveal[ing] the mysterious consonant by which the Chief of the Secret Service is known." By 30 May 1968, however, The Times was willing to name Menzies as the "former Head of the Secret Intelligence Service" in his obituary. A 1989 House of Commons debate listed a number of publications in which information about the Chief and his organization had been revealed.

The 1994 Intelligence Services Act established a statutory basis for the Secret Intelligence Service and the position of Chief. Since then, the office has had more public visibility, including a speech by John Sawers in 2010, described by The Times as "the first of its kind". The Chief remains the only member of the Secret Intelligence Service whose identity is officially made public.

In June 2025, it was announced that Sir Richard Moore would be succeeded by Blaise Metreweli, who would be the first woman to hold the role of C.

== List of chiefs ==
Chiefs have been:

No.	Portrait	Name (born–died)	Term of office			Ref.
No.	Portrait	Name (born–died)	Took office	Left office	Time in office	Ref.
1		Captain; Sir Mansfield Smith-Cumming (1859–1923)	7 October 1909	14 June 1923 †	13 years, 250 days	
2		Admiral; Sir Hugh Sinclair (1873–1939)	1923	4 November 1939 †	15–16 years	
3		Major-General; Sir Stewart Menzies (1890–1968)	1939	1952	13–14 years	
4		Major-General; Sir John Sinclair (1897–1977)	1953	1956	2–3 years	
5		Sir Richard White (1906–1993)	1956	1968	11–12 years	
6		Sir John Rennie (1914–1981)	1968	1973	4–5 years	
7		Sir Maurice Oldfield (1915–1981)	1973	1978	4–5 years	
8		Sir Arthur (Dickie) Franks (1920–2008)	1979	1982	2–3 years	
9		Sir Colin Figures (1925–2006)	1982	1985	2–3 years	
10		Sir Christopher Curwen (1929–2013)	1985	1989	3–4 years	
11		Sir Colin McColl (born 1932)	1989	1994	4–5 years	
12		Sir David Spedding (1943–2001)	1994	1999	4–5 years	
13		Sir Richard Dearlove (born 1945)	1999	6 May 2004	4–5 years	
14		Sir John Scarlett (born 1948)	6 May 2004	1 November 2009	5 years, 179 days	
15		Sir John Sawers (born 1955)	1 November 2009	1 November 2014	5 years, 0 days	
16		Sir Alex Younger (1963–2026)	1 November 2014	30 September 2020	5 years, 334 days	
17		Sir Richard Moore (born 1963)	1 October 2020	30 September 2025	4 years, 364 days	
18		Blaise Metreweli (born 1977)	1 October 2025	Incumbent	341 days	

== See also ==
- Director General of MI5
- Director of the Government Communications Headquarters
- Control (fictional character)
- M (James Bond)
