= Colin Figures =

Chief of the British Secret Intelligence Service (1925–2006)

Sir Colin Figures KCMG OBE

9th Chief of the Secret Intelligence Service
- In office 1982–1985
- Preceded by: Dick Franks
- Succeeded by: Christopher Curwen

Personal details
- Born: 1 July 1925 Birmingham, United Kingdom
- Died: 8 December 2006 (aged 81) Esher, United Kingdom
- Spouse: Pamela Ann Timmis
- Children: a son and two daughters
- Parent(s): Frederick and Muriel Figures
- Education: King Edward's School, Birmingham
- Alma mater: Pembroke College, Cambridge
- Occupation: British intelligence officer
- Awards: Knight Commander of the Order of St Michael and St George; Officer of the Order of the British Empire

Military service
- Allegiance: United Kingdom
- Branch/service: Secret Intelligence Service (SIS/MI6)
- Years of service: 1951 – 1985
- Rank: Chief of the Secret Intelligence Service
- Unit: Worcestershire Regiment
- Battles/wars: World War II; Cold War; Suez Crisis; Prague Spring; Falklands War

Sir Colin Frederick Figures KCMG OBE (1 July 1925 – 8 December 2006) was Chief of the Secret Intelligence Service (known as MI6) from 1981 to 1985. During this time he had oversight of the supply of human intelligence information, including Argentine positions and their stocks of Exocet missiles, to the UK Government during the Falklands War.

== Career ==
Figures was born in Birmingham, the son of Frederick Figures, an insurance executive, and his wife Muriel. He was educated at King Edward's School, Birmingham and served in The Worcestershire Regiment from 1943 until 1948, during which time he studied Russian via the Inter-Service Language Course at Cambridge, and served in Romania and Hungary. He read French and Russian at Pembroke College, Cambridge after being demobilised in 1948. While there, he also founded the Woodpeckers, a combined Oxford and Cambridge touring rugby team. He joined the SIS when he graduated in 1951.

After a period in London, he served in Germany, served in Amman during the Suez Crisis, in Warsaw, and in Vienna during the Prague Spring, before returning to London. He moved from Eastern bloc espionage in 1973 to supervise SIS activities in Northern Ireland. He became deputy head of SIS in 1979 and its ninth Chief in 1981. The following year, SIS was involved in the Falklands War, seeking to prevent Argentina obtaining stocks of Exocet missiles to be carried by their Super Etendard attack aircraft. He received an OBE in 1969 and CMG in 1978, and advanced to KCMG in 1983.

He retired from SIS in 1985, and became Intelligence Co-ordinator at the Cabinet Office. He finally retired in 1989.

He married Pamela Ann Timmis in 1956. He suffered from Parkinson's disease in later life, and died in Esher. He was survived by his wife, and their son and two daughters.

Government offices
Preceded by Sir Dick Franks	Chief of the SIS; 1982–1985	Succeeded by Sir Christopher Curwen
