= Colin McColl =

British intelligence officier

Sir Colin McColl KCMG

11th Chief of the Secret Intelligence Service
- In office 1989–1994
- Preceded by: Christopher Curwen
- Succeeded by: David Spedding

Personal details
- Born: 6 September 1932 (age 94)
- Education: Queen's College, Oxford
- Occupation: Intelligence officer, Diplomat
- Awards: KCMG

Sir Colin Hugh Verel McColl, KCMG (born 6 September 1932) was Head of the British Secret Intelligence Service (MI6) from 1989 to 1994.

== Career ==
Educated at Shrewsbury School and at The Queen's College, Oxford, McColl joined the diplomatic service in 1950. He served in Laos, Vietnam, Warsaw and Geneva before he was appointed Chief of the Secret Intelligence Service in 1989. In retirement he was a Director of the Scottish American Investment Company.

In 1996 McColl was appointed an Honorary Fellow of The Queen's College, Oxford.

Government offices
Preceded by Sir Christopher Curwen	Chief of the SIS; 1989–1994	Succeeded by Sir David Spedding
