= Francis Davidson =

British Army general

Major-General Francis Davidson CB DSO MC*
- Born: 1 April 1892
- Died: 15 January 1973 (aged 80); Chelsea, London, England
- Military career
- Allegiance: United Kingdom
- Branch: British Army
- Service years: 1911–1946
- Rank: Major-General
- Service number: 20272
- Unit: Royal Artillery
- Commands: Directorate of Military Intelligence (1940–1944)
- Conflicts: First World War; Second World War
- Awards: Companion of the Order of the Bath; Distinguished Service Order; Military Cross & Bar; Mentioned in Despatches (5); War Cross (Czechoslovakia); Order of the White Lion, 2nd class (Czechoslovakia); Commander of the Legion of Merit (United States); Order of Polonia Restituta, 2nd Class (Poland)

Major-General Francis Henry Norman Davidson, CB, DSO, MC & Bar (1 April 1892 – 15 January 1973) was a British Army officer who served as the Director of Military Intelligence for much of the Second World War.

== Military career ==
Born on 1 April 1892, Francis Davidson was educated at Marlborough College and the Royal Military Academy, Woolwich. From Woolwich he was commissioned as a second lieutenant into the Royal Artillery on 23 December 1911. He saw active service in the First World War, during which he was wounded, mentioned in despatches four times, and was awarded the Military Cross and Bar. He was also awarded the Distinguished Service Order.

Attending the Staff College, Quetta, between 1925 and 1927 Davidson worked at the Headquarters of the British Indian Army and was brigade major of the 12th Indian Infantry Brigade from 1927 to 1929. He was promoted to major in 1929, lieutenant colonel in 1933 and colonel in 1938. He worked at the War Office from 1930 to 1934, before attending a course at the Imperial Defence College from 1935 to 1936. Between 1937 and 1938 he was an instructor at the Staff College, Camberley.

At the start of the Second World War in September 1939, Davidson was serving, as he had been since January 1938, as the GSO1 of the 2nd Infantry Division, initially under Major General Henry Maitland Wilson, until he was succeeded in June 1939 by Major General Charles Loyd, based at Aldershot. He was Commander, Royal Artillery of I Corps between 1939 and 1940 as part of the British Expeditionary Force, then in France. He briefly served as the acting commander of the 2nd Division in 1940 and, after serving as Brigadier General Staff of X Corps from June 1940, he was promoted to acting major general on 16 December 1940. That same year he became the Director of Military Intelligence, a position he held until 1944. He was subsequently on the British Army Staff in Washington, D.C. until his retirement from the regular army in 1946. He was made a Commander of the Legion of Merit in 1948.

Between 1952 and 1960 Davidson served as the Colonel Commandant of the Intelligence Corps. He spent his final years in Chelsea, London, where he died on 15 January 1973, at the age of 80.

== Bibliography ==
- Smart, Nick (2005). Biographical Dictionary of British Generals of the Second World War. Barnsley: Pen and Sword Books. ISBN 1844150496.

Military offices
Preceded by Frederick Beaumont-Nesbitt	Director of Military Intelligence; 1940–1944	Succeeded by Sir John Sinclair
