= Christopher Curwen =

British Intelligence officer

Sir Christopher Curwen KCMG

10th Chief of the Secret Intelligence Service
- In office 1985–1989
- Preceded by: Colin Figures
- Succeeded by: Colin McColl

Deputy Chief of the Secret Intelligence Service
- In office 1980–1985

Personal details
- Born: 9 April 1929
- Died: 18 December 2013 (aged 84)
- Education: Sidney Sussex College, Cambridge
- Occupation: Intelligence officer
- Awards: KCMG

Military service
- Allegiance: United Kingdom
- Branch/service: British Army; Secret Intelligence Service (SIS/MI6)
- Unit: 4th Queen's Own Hussars
- Battles/wars: World War II; Cold War; Indochina wars; Berlin Wall

Sir Christopher Keith Curwen, KCMG (9 April 1929 – 18 December 2013) was a British Intelligence officer specialising in South East Asia who was Head of the Secret Intelligence Service (MI6) from 1985 to 1989.

== Career ==
Curwen was educated at Sherborne School and Sidney Sussex College, Cambridge after which he was commissioned into the 4th Queen's Own Hussars in 1948, serving in Malaya. He joined SIS in 1952 and was posted to Thailand in 1954 and Vientiane, Laos in 1956. He returned to the service's London headquarters in 1958, had another spell in Bangkok from 1961 and then two years in Kuala Lumpur. He was at one time married to a woman from Burma; they were later divorced.

Curwen spent three years as SIS liaison officer in Washington D.C. from 1968 and was then head of station in Geneva. He was deputy to Sir Colin Figures from 1980 and succeeded him as Chief of the Service in 1985. His tenure was notable for the successful exfiltration from Moscow of the KGB officer and British agent Oleg Gordievsky.

His obituary in The Times noted: "He possessed a romantic patriotism that belied his hard-headed persona."

== Notes ==
- Sir Christopher Curwen entry in Who's Who
- Curwen entry in the Oxford Dictionary of National Biography

Government offices
Preceded by Sir Colin Figures	Chief of the SIS; 1985–1989	Succeeded by Sir Colin McColl
