= MI6 =

British foreign intelligence agency

Secret Intelligence Service (MI6)

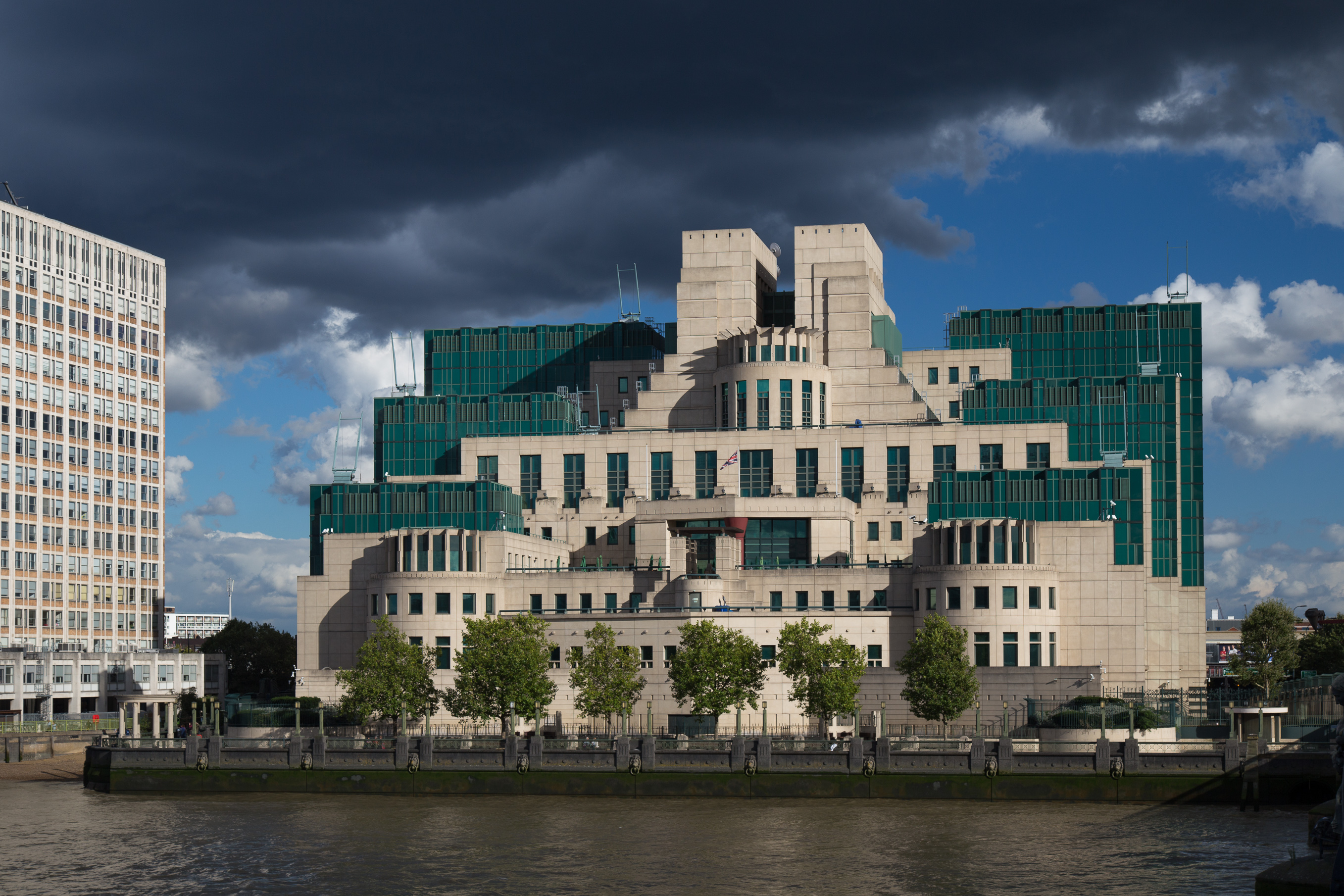
- SIS Building, the headquarters of MI6 in London

Agency overview
- Formed: 4 July 1909; 117 years ago
- Preceding agency: Secret Service Bureau
- Type: Foreign intelligence service
- Jurisdiction: His Majesty's Government
- Headquarters: SIS Building London, England United Kingdom; 51°29′14″N 0°7′27″W
- Motto: Semper Occultus ("Always Secret")
- Employees: 3,753 (2023)
- Annual budget: Single Intelligence Account £4.932 billion (2025–26)
- Minister responsible: Ed Miliband, Foreign Secretary
- Agency executive: Blaise Metreweli, Chief of the SIS
- Website: sis.gov.uk

The Secret Intelligence Service (SIS), commonly known as MI6 (Military Intelligence, Section 6), is the foreign intelligence service of the United Kingdom, tasked mainly with the covert overseas collection and analysis of human intelligence on foreign nationals in support of its Five Eyes partners. SIS is one of the British intelligence agencies and the chief of the Secret Intelligence Service (known as "C") is directly accountable to the foreign secretary.

Formed in 1909 as the Foreign Section of the Secret Service Bureau, the section grew greatly during the First World War, officially adopting its current name around 1920. The name "MI6" originated as a convenient label during the Second World War, when SIS was known by many names. It is still commonly used today. The existence of SIS was not officially acknowledged until 1994. That year the Intelligence Services Act 1994 (ISA) was introduced to Parliament, to place the organisation on a statutory footing for the first time. It provides the legal basis for its operations. Today, SIS is subject to public oversight by the Investigatory Powers Tribunal and the Intelligence and Security Committee of Parliament.

The stated priority roles of SIS are counter-terrorism, counter-proliferation, providing intelligence in support of cyber security, and supporting stability overseas to disrupt terrorism and other criminal activities. Unlike its main sister agencies, the Security Service (MI5) and Government Communications Headquarters (GCHQ), SIS works exclusively in foreign intelligence gathering; the ISA only allows it to carry out operations against persons outside the British Islands. Some of SIS's actions since the 2000s have attracted significant controversy, such as its alleged complicity in acts of torture and extraordinary rendition.

Since 1994, SIS headquarters have been in the SIS Building in London, on the South Bank of the River Thames.

== Structure and mission ==
The main mission of SIS is to collect foreign intelligence for the United Kingdom. It provides the British government with vital intelligence regarding foreign events and informs concerning global covert capabilities to uphold national interests, security and protect the country's economic well-being. SIS works with the Foreign, Commonwealth & Development Office and therefore falls under the supervision of the Foreign Secretary.

SIS officers and agents engage in operations and missions all around the world. The SIS regularly cooperates and works with MI5 and GCHQ regarding domestic and cyber intelligence. SIS has three primary tasks:

- Counter Terrorism – preventing terrorism and extremism in the UK, against national interests within the realm or overseas, and supporting the UK's allies
- Espionage – protecting the national security
- Cyber – using cyber technology and digital expertise to reduce threats.

The impact and success in these situations helps to prevent hostile influence, keep the UK's defences on alert to reduce serious and organised crime, and to detect violations of international law.

== Organisation ==
=== Governance ===
The government sets the necessary laws, regulations and funding needed to keep the SIS operating and to conduct its activities.

Under these rules, SIS is accountable to the government of the day and the SIS carry out their work in accordance to the government's foreign policy. The Prime Minister is ultimately responsible for intelligence and security, with day-to-day ministerial responsibility with the Foreign Secretary, to whom the SIS report directly. The Foreign Secretary appoints the head of SIS, to oversee SIS daily management and work.

The Chief of the Secret Intelligence Service has a twofold responsibility within SIS. Internally, they oversee the continuous gathering of intelligence from agents, which involves making complex decisions about risk, resource allocation, and technological adaptation. In today's interconnected, data-driven world, maintaining secrecy and conducting undercover operations have become increasingly challenging.

Externally, the chief also operates as a secret diplomat, tasked with maintaining vital alliances that support intelligence cooperation. Additionally, they may need to establish discreet communication channels with countries where traditional diplomatic relations are delicate. Successfully navigating these dual roles requires a nuanced understanding of both internal operations and international relations. Blaise Metreweli has been the chief of SIS since 2025.

Command and control over SIS is through four main government entities: the Central Intelligence Machinery, the Ministerial Committee on the Intelligence Services, the Permanent Secretaries' Committee on the Intelligence Services, and the Joint Intelligence Committee.

=== Joint Intelligence Committee ===
The Joint Intelligence Committee (JIC) assesses the intelligence gathered by GCHQ, MI5, and SIS and presents it to cabinet ministers, who in turn, enable the government's policies to help achieve national security and defence. The JIC also reports the intelligence analysis to the Cabinet Office itself.

Committee members are required to bring the reports and findings to their respective ministers and departments, so as to make appropriate assessments that help in planning, preparing operational activities, planning or making policy decisions. The Chairman of the Committee is responsible specifically with ensuring the Committee's monitoring and oversight over intelligence data are conducted effectively and responsibly. Permanent and temporary sub-committees and working groups are constituted by the Committee to carry out its duties responsibly.

=== Budget ===
HM Treasury has directed the security and intelligence agencies to prepare financial statements for each financial year in accordance with the Government Resources and Accounts Act 2000.

Due to security concerns, the Government does not publish these financial statements, which are audited by the Comptroller and Auditor General and then shown to the chair of the Public Accounts Committee in accordance with the Intelligence Services Act 1994.

The annual Parliamentary financial statements for 2021–2022 indicated that the combined British intelligence services spending was £3.44 billion, with some $1.09 billion being further allocated to staff pay and agents and a further £636 million allocated to capital spending.

=== Legislation ===
The following legislation regulates the SIS:

- Intelligence Services Act 1994
- Investigatory Powers Act 2016
- Human Rights Act 1998

Oversight is undertaken by Parliament through the following organisations:

- Investigatory Powers Commissioner's Office (IPCO)
- Investigatory Powers Tribunal (IPT)
- Intelligence and Security Committee (ISC)

== History and development ==
=== Foundation ===
The service derived from the Secret Service Bureau, which was founded on 1 October 1909. The Bureau was a joint initiative of the Admiralty and the War Office to control secret intelligence operations in the UK and overseas, particularly concentrating on the activities of the Imperial German government. The bureau was split into naval and army sections which, over time, specialised in foreign espionage and internal counter-espionage activities, respectively. This specialisation was because the Admiralty wanted to know the maritime strength of the Imperial German Navy. This specialisation was formalised before 1914. During the First World War in 1916, the two sections underwent administrative changes so that the foreign section became the section MI1(c) of the Directorate of Military Intelligence.

Its first director was Captain Sir Mansfield George Smith-Cumming, who often dropped the Smith in routine communication. He typically signed correspondence with his initial C in green ink. This usage evolved as a code name, and has been adhered to by all subsequent directors of SIS when signing documents to retain anonymity.

=== First World War ===
The service's performance during the First World War was mixed, because it was unable to establish a network in Germany itself. Most of its results came from military and commercial intelligence collected through networks in neutral countries, occupied territories, and Russia. During the war, MI6 had its main European office in Rotterdam from where it coordinated espionage in Germany and occupied Belgium. A crucial element in the war effort from the British perspective was the involvement of Russia, which kept millions of German soldiers that would otherwise be deployed on the Western Front, engaged on the Eastern Front. On 7 November 1917 the Bolsheviks under Vladimir Lenin overthrew the Provisional government in Petrograd and signed an armistice with Germany. The main objective for the British was to keep Russia in the war, and MI6's two chosen instruments for doing so were Sidney Reilly, who despite his Irish name was a Russian-Jewish adventurer, and George Alexander Hill, a British pilot and businessman. Officially, Reilly's mandate was to collect intelligence about the new regime in Russia and find a way to keep Russia in the war, but Reilly soon became involved in a plot to overthrow the Bolsheviks.

=== Inter-war period ===
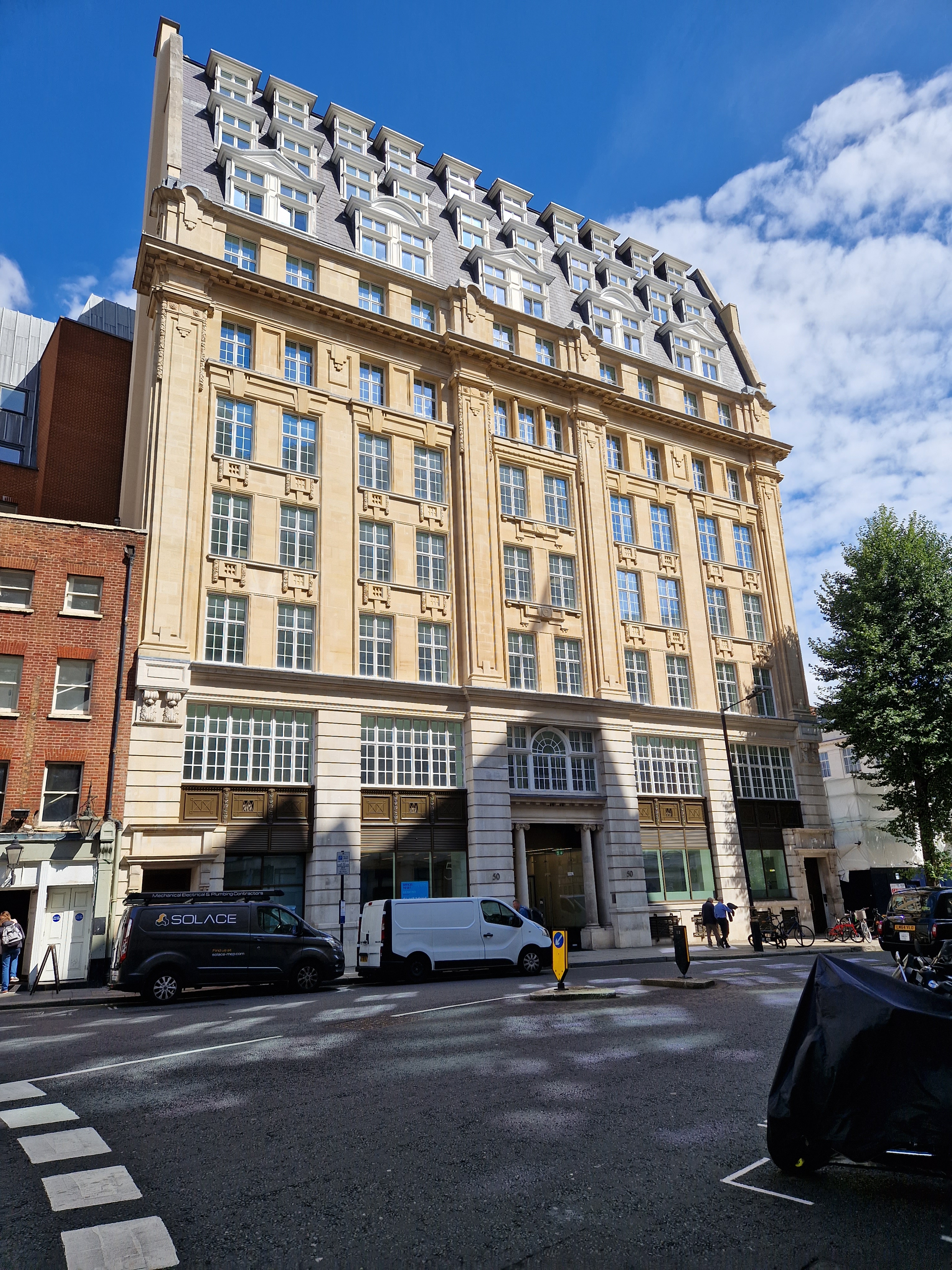
54 Broadway, SIS headquarters from 1924 until 1964

After the war, resources were significantly reduced but during the 1920s, SIS established a close operational relationship with the diplomatic service. In August 1919, Cumming created the new passport control department, providing diplomatic cover for agents abroad. The post of Passport Control Officer provided operatives with diplomatic immunity. Circulating Sections established intelligence requirements and passed the intelligence back to its consumer departments, mainly the War Office and Admiralty. Recruitment and the training of spies in the interwar period was quite casual. Cumming referred to espionage as a "capital sport", and expected his agents to learn the "tradecraft" of espionage while on their missions instead of before being dispatched on their missions. One MI6 agent Leslie Nicholson recalled about his first assignment in Prague: "nobody gave me any tips on how to be a spy, how to make contact with, and worm vital information out of unsuspecting experts". It was not until the Second World War that the "methodical training" of agents that has been the hallmark of British intelligence started. A number of MI6 agents – like MI5 agents – were former colonial police officers while MI6 displayed a strong bias against recruiting men with university degrees as universities were considered within MI6 to be bastions of "effete intellectualism". Claude Dansey, who served as the MI6 Deputy Chief in World War II wrote: "I would never willing employ an university man. I have less fear of Bolshies and Fascists than I have of some pedantic, but vocal university professor".

The debate over the future structure of British Intelligence continued at length after the end of hostilities but Cumming managed to engineer the return of the Service to Foreign Office control. At this time, the organisation was known in Whitehall by a variety of titles including the Foreign Intelligence Service, the Secret Service, MI1(c), the Special Intelligence Service and even C's organisation. Around 1920, it began increasingly to be referred to as the Secret Intelligence Service (SIS), a title that it has continued to use to the present day and which was enshrined in statute in the Intelligence Services Act 1994. During the Second World War, the name MI6 was used as a flag of convenience, the name by which it is frequently known in popular culture since.

In the immediate post-war years under Sir Mansfield Smith-Cumming and throughout most of the 1920s, SIS was focused on Communism, in particular, Russian Bolshevism. Examples include a thwarted operation to overthrow the Bolshevik government in 1918 by SIS agents Sidney George Reilly and Sir Robert Bruce Lockhart, as well as more orthodox espionage efforts within early Soviet Russia headed by Captain George Hill.

Smith-Cumming died suddenly at his home on 14 June 1923, shortly before he was due to retire, and was replaced as C by Admiral Sir Hugh "Quex" Sinclair. Sinclair created the following sections:

- A central foreign counter-espionage Circulating Section, Section V, to liaise with the Security Service to collate counter-espionage reports from overseas stations.
- An economic intelligence section, Section VII, to deal with trade, industry and contraband.
- A clandestine radio communications organisation, Section VIII, to communicate with operatives and agents overseas.
- Section N to exploit the contents of foreign diplomatic bags
- Section D to conduct political covert actions and paramilitary operations in time of war. Section D would organise the Home Defence Scheme resistance organisation in the UK and come to be the foundation of the Special Operations Executive (SOE) during the Second World War.

In 1924, MI6 intervened in the general election of that year by leaking the so-called Zinoviev letter to the Daily Mail, which published it on its front page on 25 October 1924. The letter, which was a forgery, was supposedly from Grigory Zinoviev, the chief of the Comintern, ordering British Communists to take over the Labour Party. The Zinoviev letter, which was written in English, came into possession of the MI6 resident at the British Embassy in Riga on 9 October 1924 who forwarded it to London. The Zinoviev letter played a key role in the defeat of the minority Labour government of Ramsay MacDonald and the victory of the Conservatives under Stanley Baldwin in the general election of 29 October 1924. It has been established the MI6 leaked the Zinoviev letter to the Daily Mail, but it remains unclear if MI6 was aware at the time that the letter was a forgery.

With the emergence of Germany as a threat following the ascendence of the Nazis, in the early 1930s attention was shifted in that direction. In 1934, a defense requirements commitment that consisted of Sir Robert Vansittart of the Foreign Office, Sir Warren Fisher of the Treasury, General Sir Maurice Hankey of the Committee for Imperial Defense, and the three service chiefs produced an influential memo that labelled Germany the "ultimate potential enemy". The memo noted that Germany had the world's second largest economy (being exceeded only by the economy of the United States), was a world leader in science and technology, and was capable of mobilising millions of men for war. However, it was generally believed in the United Kingdom at the time that the arms race before 1914 had caused the Great War, and consequently there was a belief that British rearmament would increase international tensions and would make a war more likely than less likely. On the converse, there was the possibility if Germany rearmed while Britain did not, it would leave the Reich in a strong position to launch a war. It was decided that British rearmament would be linked to the extent of German rearmament with British rearmament to be reactive rather than preemptive. The primary request from decision-makers in the government regarding Germany was for MI6 to collect intelligence about German rearmament in order to establish the level of British rearmament that was to be pursued in response. British decision-makers were especially concerned about the prospect of German strategic bombing of British cities as contemporary experts vastly exaggerated the power of strategic bombing to kill millions within a few days. Harold Macmillan later recalled: "We thought of air warfare in 1938 rather as people think of nuclear warfare today". As a result, MI6's number one priority with regard to Germany was collect intelligence on the Luftwaffe, the branch of the Wehrmacht that British decision-makers feared the most. To assist with studying German industrial production, the Industrial Intelligence Centre under Desmond Morton was founded in 1934 with a special mandate to study German aircraft production. However, Admiral Sinclair complained in 1935 that MI6's annual budget for operations around the world was equal to the cost of maintaining one destroyer in home waters, and that the demands placed upon his service exceeded its budget. The focus on the Luftwaffe along with MI6's relatively small budget led to constant complaints from both the War Office and the Admiralty that MI6 was neglecting both the German Army and the Kriegsmarine. The Asian branch of the SIS was known as the "Cinderella branch" owing to its neglect by London.

MI6 assisted the Gestapo, the Nazi secret police, with "the exchange of information about communism" as late as October 1937, well into the Nazi era; the head of the British agency's Berlin station, Frank Foley, was still able to describe his relationship with the Gestapo's so-called communism expert as "cordial". In 1936, in a sign that he lacked confidence in his own agents, Sinclair founded the semi-autonomous Z section under Claude Dansey for economic intelligence about Germany. Working alongside the Z section was the British Industrial Secret Service headed by a Canadian businessman living in London, William Stephenson that recruited British businessmen active in Germany for intelligence about German industrial production. For intelligence on German military plans, MI6 largely depended upon Czechoslovak military intelligence from 1937 onward as Paul Thümmel, aka "Agent A-54", a senior officer in the German intelligence service, the Abwehr, had been bribed into working for Czechoslovakia. Thus most of what MI6 knew about German plans during both the Sudetenland crisis and the Danzig crisis came from the Czechoslovak military intelligence, which continued to run Thümmel even after the dissolution of Czecho-Slovakia in March 1939 and a government-in-exile was set up. Sir Nevile Henderson, the British ambassador to Germany from 1937 to 1939, was actively hostile towards MI6 running agents out of the British embassy in Berlin as he made it clear his belief that espionage against Germany would hamper the "general settlement" he was seeking with the Reich. The focus on collecting intelligence on German aircraft production led MI6 to be confused about the wider strategic question of what were the aims of German foreign policy. On 18 September 1938, a memo entitled "What Shall We Do?" written by Malcolm Woollcombe, the chief of the Political Intelligence, declared that the best way of resolving the Sudetenland crisis was for the Sudetenland to be peacefully annexed to Germany. The report concluded that allowing the Sudetenland to be annexed would allow Britain to finally discover "what really legitimate grievances Germany has and what surgical operations are necessary to recify them".

In January 1939, MI6 played a major role in the "Dutch War Scare" when it reported to London that Germany was about to invade the Netherlands with the aim of using the Dutch airfields to launch a strategic bombing campaign that would achieve a "knock out blow" by destroying London along with the rest of Britain's cities. The intelligence behind the "Dutch War Scare" was false, intended to achieve a change in British foreign policy and had its desired effect on the Chamberlain government. The Deuxième Bureau had manufactured the story as a way to force Britain to make a stronger commitment to defend France. The "limited liability" rearmament policy pursued by the Chamberlain government had intentionally starved the British Army of funds to rule out the "continental commitment" (i.e. Britain sending a large expeditionary force) from ever being made again, with the majority of military spending being devoted to the RAF and the Royal Navy. As such, Britain simply did not possess the military force to save the Netherlands, leading to urgent requests being made to Paris to ask if France would be willing to assist with the defence of the Netherlands. In response, the French replied that Britain would need to do more for France if the British wanted the French to do something for them. On 6 February 1939 in a beginning of a shift in British foreign policy, Prime Minister Chamberlain announced in the House of Commons that "any threat to the vital interest of France" would lead to a British declaration of war. One of MI6’s most successful operations before the war started in April 1939 when an Australian businessman living in London, Sidney Cotton, who was already engaged in aerial photographic espionage for the Deuxième Bureau was recruited to fly missions over Germany. Under the cover story that he was a sales agent for a dummy corporation, the Aeronautical Research and Sales Corporation, Cotton flew over Germany, Italy and the Italian colony of Libya in his Lockheed 12A aircraft, taking numerous high-quality aerial photographs of German and Italian military bases that proved immensely useful for Britain during the war.

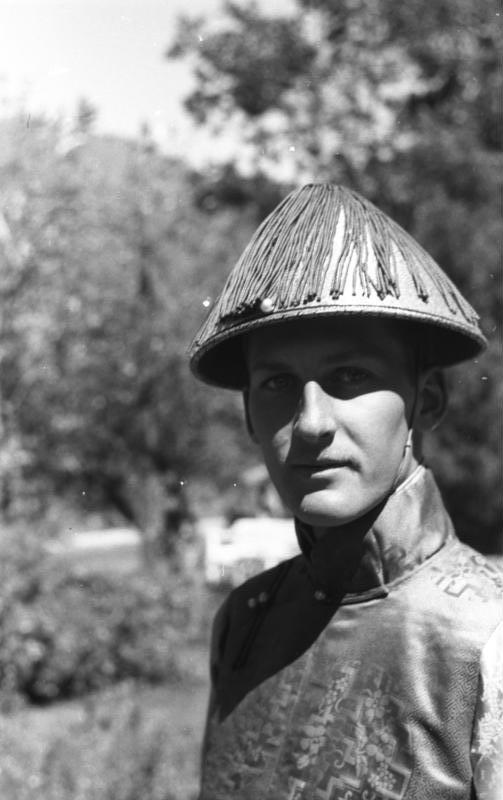
A young Englishman, member of the Secret Intelligence Service, in Yatung, Tibet, photographed by Ernst Schäfer in 1939

On 26 and 27 July 1939, in Pyry near Warsaw, British military intelligence representatives including Dilly Knox, Alastair Denniston and Humphrey Sandwith were introduced by their allied Polish counterparts to their Enigma-decryption techniques and equipment, including Zygalski sheets and the cryptologic "Bomba", and were promised future delivery of a reverse-engineered, Polish-built duplicate Enigma machine. The demonstration represented a vital basis for the later British continuation of the war effort. During the war, British cryptologists decrypted a vast number of messages enciphered on Enigma. The intelligence gleaned from this source, codenamed "Ultra" by the British, was a substantial aid to the Allied war effort.

=== Second World War ===
Sinclair died on 4 November 1939, after an illness, and was replaced as C by Lt Col. Stewart Menzies (Horse Guards), who had been with the service since the end of World War I. On 9 November 1939, MI6 was embarrassed by the Venlo incident. The Prime Minister, Neville Chamberlain, was unenthusiastic about the prospect of war, and clung to the hope all through the Phoney War that the Wehrmacht generals would overthrow Hitler, after which the war would end. Two MI6 officers, Sigismund Payne Best and Henry Stevens had been dispatched to a café in Venlo almost on the German border to meet a representative of the Wehrmacht generals, but the meeting proved to be an ambush as instead a party of the Sicherheitsdienst officers crossed over the border. The SS shot and killed a Dutch intelligence officer, Dirk Klop, who assisted with settling up the meeting and kidnapped Best and Stevens at gunpoint. The Venlo incident made the British government wary for the rest of the war with any more contact with the Wehrmacht generals.

During the Second World War the human intelligence work of the service was complemented by several other initiatives:

- The cryptanalytic effort undertaken by the Government Code and Cypher School (GC&CS), the bureau responsible for interception and decryption of foreign communications at Bletchley Park. (See above.)
- The extensive 'double-cross' system run by MI5 to feed misleading intelligence to the Germans.
- Imagery intelligence activities conducted by the RAF Photographic Reconnaissance Unit (now JARIC, The National Imagery Exploitation Centre).

GC&CS was the source of Ultra intelligence, which was very useful.

The chief of SIS, Stewart Menzies, insisted on wartime control of codebreaking, and this gave him immense power and influence, which he used judiciously. By distributing the Ultra material collected by the Government Code and Cypher School, MI6 became, for the first time, an important branch of the government. Extensive breaches of Nazi Enigma signals gave Menzies and his team enormous insight into Adolf Hitler's strategy, and this was kept a closely held secret.

In 1940, the British intelligence services entered into a special agreement with their Polish counterparts. This collaboration between the two nations played a significant role in shaping the course of World War II. In July 2005, the governments of the United Kingdom and Poland jointly produced a comprehensive two-volume study that shed light on their bilateral intelligence cooperation during the war. This study, which unveiled information that had been classified as secret until that point, was known as the Report of the Anglo-Polish Historical Committee.

The report was authored by leading historians and experts who were granted unprecedented access to the archives of British intelligence. One of the most remarkable findings was that 48 percent of all reports received by British secret services from continental Europe during the years 1939–45 had originated from Polish sources. This significant contribution from the Polish intelligence was made possible by the fact that occupied Poland had a long-standing tradition of insurgency organizations, which had been passed down through generations. These organizations maintained networks in emigrant Polish communities in Germany and France.

A substantial part of the Polish resistance activity was clandestine and involved the establishment of cellular intelligence networks. The occupation of Poland by Nazi Germany also placed the Polish people in a unique position to gather intelligence on the enemy, as they were often used as forced laborers across the continent. This proximity to key locations and military installations allowed them to provide valuable insights to the British intelligence services.

The liaison between the British and Polish intelligence was facilitated by SIS (Secret Intelligence Service) officer Wilfred Dunderdale. The reports exchanged between the two parties included critical information such as advance warnings of the Afrika Korps' departure for Libya, insights into the readiness of Vichy French units to either fight against the Allies or switch sides during Operation Torch, and early warnings regarding both Operation Barbarossa and Operation Edelweiss, the German Caucasus campaign.

Polish-sourced reporting on German secret weapons began in 1941, and Operation Wildhorn enabled a British special operations flight to airlift a captured V-2 Rocket with the assistance of the Polish resistance. Notably, Polish secret agent Jan Karski played a crucial role in delivering the first Allied intelligence on the Holocaust, providing the British with harrowing information about Nazi atrocities. Moreover, through a female Polish agent, the British established a channel of communication with the anti-Nazi chief of the Abwehr, Admiral Wilhelm Canaris. This alliance allowed for the exchange of critical intelligence information and further strengthened the cooperation between the British and Polish intelligence services during this pivotal period in history.

1939 saw the most significant failure of the service during the war, known as the Venlo incident for the Dutch town where much of the operation took place. Agents of the German army secret service, the Abwehr, and the counter-espionage section of the Sicherheitsdienst (SD), posed as high-ranking officers involved in a plot to depose Hitler. In a series of meetings between SIS agents and the 'conspirators', SS plans to abduct the SIS team were shelved due to the presence of Dutch police. On the night of 8–9 November, a meeting took place without police presence. There, the two SIS agents were duly abducted by the SS.

In 1940, journalist and Soviet agent Kim Philby applied for a vacancy in Section D of SIS, and was vetted by his friend and fellow Soviet agent Guy Burgess. When Section D was absorbed by Special Operations Executive (SOE) in summer of 1940, Philby was appointed as an instructor in black propaganda at the SOE's training establishment in Beaulieu, Hampshire.

In May 1940, MI6 set up British Security Co-ordination (BSC), on the authorisation of Prime Minister Winston Churchill over the objections of Stewart Menzies. This was a covert organisation based in New York City, headed by William Stephenson intended to investigate enemy activities, prevent sabotage against British interests in the Americas, and mobilise pro-British opinion in the Americas. BSC also founded Camp X in Canada to train clandestine operators and to establish (in 1942) a telecommunications relay station, code name Hydra, operated by engineer Benjamin deForest Bayly.

SIS operations in Asia were hindered by the fact that Europeans tended to stick out in Asia along with an inability to recruit Asian agents. The SOE had more success in both recruiting agents in Asia and in sending agents into the Japanese-occupied areas in China and southeast Asia, which caused tensions with MI6 who were jealous of the ability of the upstart SOE to do what they could not. SOE was more open to recruiting from within the Commonwealth, recruiting Chinese-Canadians and Australian-Chinese, to operate behind the Japanese lines under the grounds Asian agents would less likely to be arrested by the Kempeitai, the much feared Japanese military police. In 1944, about 90% of the human intelligence in Burma came from the SOE while 70% of the human intelligence in Malaya, Thailand and French Indochina came from the SOE. General William Slim, the GOC of the 14th Army, complained about the low quality of SIS intelligence in late 1943 as he stated that the intelligence he received from MI6 was "far from being complete or accurate". In late 1944-early 1945, Slim attempted to have the 14th Army take over all intelligence operations in Burma with both SIS and SOE agents to be subordinate to the 14th Army under the grounds the Army was more capable of running intelligence operations in southeast Asia than MI6. Menzies who fiercely defended the prerogatives of MI6 was able to block this proposal despite the way it was universally accepted by officers serving in the China-Burma-India theater that SIS was unsuitable to operating in that part of the world. MI6 was able to keep operating in Asia by making the argument that the SOE was only a temporary organisation that was to be disbanded after the war ended while MI6 was the permanent intelligence service that would continue after the war, and that to exclude MI6 from Asia would weaken British intelligence in the post-war world.

In early 1944, MI6 re-established Section IX, its prewar anti-Soviet section, and Philby took a position there. He was able to alert the NKVD about all British intelligence on the Soviets—including what the American OSS had shared with the British about the Soviets.

Despite these difficulties the service nevertheless conducted substantial and successful operations in both occupied Europe and in the Middle East and Far East where it operated under the cover name Inter-Services Liaison Department (ISLD).

=== Cold War ===
In August 1945 Soviet intelligence officer Konstantin Volkov tried to defect to the UK, offering the names of all Soviet agents working inside British intelligence. Philby received the memo on Volkov's offer and alerted the Soviets, so they could arrest him. In 1946, SIS absorbed the "rump" remnant of the Special Operations Executive (SOE), dispersing the latter's personnel and equipment between its operational divisions or "controllerates" and new Directorates for Training and Development and for War Planning. The 1921 arrangement was streamlined with the geographical, operational units redesignated "Production Sections", sorted regionally under Controllers, all under a Director of Production. The Circulating Sections were renamed "Requirements Sections" and placed under a Directorate of Requirements.

Following the Second World War, tens of thousands of Holocaust survivors attempted to reach Palestine as part of the Aliyah Bet refugee movement. As part of British government efforts to stem this migration, Operation Embarrass saw the SIS bomb five ships in Italy in 1947–48 to prevent them being used by the refugees, and set up a fake Palestinian group to take responsibility for the attacks. However, some in SIS wanted the policy to go further, noting that "intimidation is only likely to be effective if some members of the group of people to be intimidated actually suffer unpleasant consequences" and criticising the decision to not take stronger action against Exodus 1947 (which was, instead, seized and returned to mainland Europe).

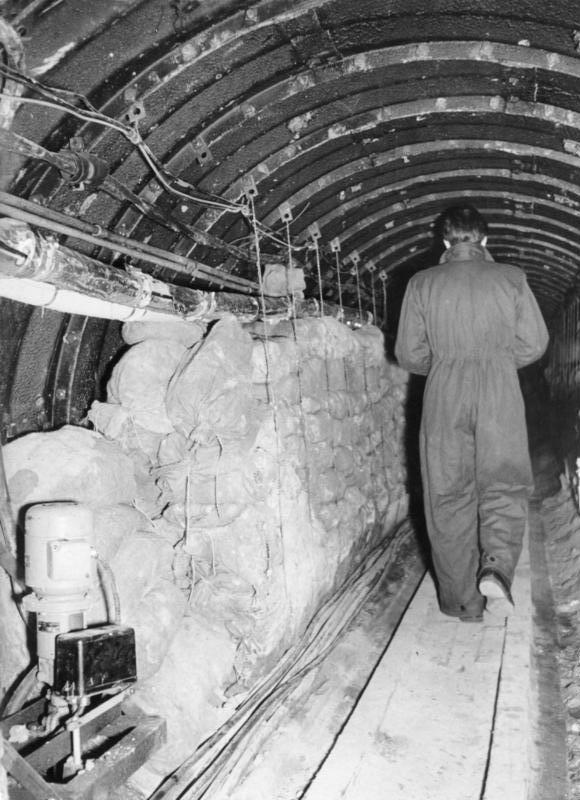
Operation Gold: the Berlin tunnel in 1956

SIS operations against the USSR were extensively compromised by the presence of an agent working for the Soviet Union, Harold Adrian Russell "Kim" Philby, in the post-war Counter-Espionage Section, R5. SIS suffered further embarrassment when it was revealed that an officer involved in both the Vienna and Berlin tunnel operations had been turned as a Soviet agent during internment by the Chinese during the Korean War. This agent, George Blake, returned from his internment to be treated as something of a hero by his contemporaries in "the office". His security authorisation was restored, and in 1953 he was posted to the Vienna Station where the original Vienna tunnels had been running for years. After compromising these to his Soviet controllers, he was subsequently assigned to the British team involved on Operation Gold, the Berlin tunnel, and which was, consequently, blown from the outset. In 1956, SIS Director John Sinclair had to resign after the botched affair of the death of Lionel Crabb.

SIS activities included a range of covert political actions, including the overthrow of Mohammed Mossadeq in Iran in the 1953 Iranian coup d'état (in collaboration with the US Central Intelligence Agency).

Despite earlier Soviet penetration, SIS began to recover as a result of improved vetting and security, and a series of successful penetrations. From 1958, SIS had three moles in the Polish UB, the most successful of which was codenamed NODDY. The CIA described the information SIS received from these Poles as "some of the most valuable intelligence ever collected", and rewarded SIS with $20 million to expand their Polish operation. In 1961 Polish defector Michael Goleniewski exposed George Blake as a Soviet agent. Blake was identified, arrested, tried for espionage and sent to prison. He escaped and was exfiltrated to the USSR in 1966.

Within the GRU, in a joint operation with the American CIA, the MI6 recruited Colonel Oleg Penkovsky. Penkovsky ran for two years as a considerable success, providing several thousand photographed documents, including Red Army rocketry manuals that allowed US National Photographic Interpretation Center (NPIC) analysts to recognise the deployment pattern of Soviet SS4 MRBMs and SS5 IRBMs in Cuba in October 1962. SIS operations against the USSR continued to gain pace through the remainder of the Cold War, arguably peaking with the recruitment in the 1970s of Oleg Gordievsky who SIS ran for the better part of a decade, then successfully exfiltrated from the USSR across the Finnish border in 1985.

During the Soviet–Afghan War, SIS supported the Islamic resistance group commanded by Ahmad Shah Massoud and he became a key ally in the fight against the Soviets. An annual mission of two SIS officers, as well as military instructors, were sent to Massoud and his fighters. Through them, weapons and supplies, radios and vital intelligence on Soviet battle plans were all sent to the Afghan resistance. SIS also helped to retrieve crashed Soviet helicopters from Afghanistan.

The real scale and impact of SIS activities during the second half of the Cold War remains unknown, however, because the bulk of their most successful targeting operations against Soviet officials were the result of "Third Country" operations recruiting Soviet sources travelling abroad in Asia and Africa. These included the defection to the SIS Tehran station in 1982 of KGB officer Vladimir Kuzichkin, the son of a senior Politburo member and a member of the KGB's internal Second Chief Directorate who provided SIS and the British government with warning of the mobilisation of the KGB's Alpha Force during the 1991 August Coup which briefly toppled Soviet leader Mikhail Gorbachev.

=== After the Cold War ===
The end of the Cold War led to a reshuffle of existing priorities. The Soviet Bloc ceased to swallow the lion's share of operational priorities, although the stability and intentions of a weakened but still nuclear-capable Federal Russia constituted a significant concern. Instead, functional rather than geographical intelligence requirements came to the fore such as counter-proliferation (via the agency's Production and Targeting, Counter-Proliferation Section) which had been a sphere of activity since the discovery of Pakistani physics students studying nuclear-weapons related subjects in 1974; counter-terrorism (via two joint sections run in collaboration with the Security Service, one for Irish republicanism and one for international terrorism); counter-narcotics and serious crime (originally set up under the Western Hemisphere controllerate in 1989); and a 'global issues' section looking at matters such as the environment and other public welfare issues. In the mid-1990s these were consolidated into a new post of Controller, Global and Functional.

During the transition, then-C Sir Colin McColl embraced a new, albeit limited, policy of openness towards the press and public, with 'public affairs' falling into the brief of Director, Counter-Intelligence and Security (renamed Director, Security and Public Affairs). McColl's policies were part and parcel with a wider 'open government initiative' developed from 1993 by the government of John Major. As part of this, SIS operations, and those of the national signals intelligence agency, GCHQ, were placed on a statutory footing through the 1994 Intelligence Services Act. Although the Act provided procedures for authorisations and warrants, this essentially enshrined mechanisms that had been in place at least since 1953 (for authorisations) and 1985 (under the Interception of Communications Act, for warrants). Under this Act, since 1994, SIS and GCHQ activities have been subject to scrutiny by Parliament's Intelligence and Security Committee.

During the mid-1990s the British intelligence community was subjected to a comprehensive costing review by the government. As part of broader defence cut-backs SIS had its resources cut back twenty-five percent across the board and senior management was reduced by forty percent. As a consequence of these cuts, the Requirements division (formerly the Circulating Sections of the 1921 Arrangement) were deprived of any representation on the board of directors. At the same time, the Middle East and Africa controllerates were pared back and amalgamated. According to the findings of Lord Butler of Brockwell's Review of Weapons of Mass Destruction, the reduction of operational capabilities in the Middle East and of the Requirements division's ability to challenge the quality of the information the Middle East Controllerate was providing weakened the Joint Intelligence Committee's estimates of Iraq's non-conventional weapons programmes. These weaknesses were major contributors to the UK's erroneous assessments of Iraq's 'weapons of mass destruction' prior to the 2003 invasion of that country.

On one occasion in 1998, MI6 believed it might be able to obtain 'actionable intelligence' which could help the CIA capture Osama bin Laden, the leader of Al Qaeda. But given that this might result in his being transferred or rendered to the United States, MI6 decided it had to ask for ministerial approval before passing the intelligence on (in case he faced the death penalty or mistreatment). This was approved by a minister 'provided the CIA gave assurances regarding humane treatment'. In the end, not enough intelligence came through to make it worthwhile going ahead.

In 2001, it became clear that working with Ahmad Shah Massoud and his forces was the best option for going after Bin Laden; the priority for MI6 was developing intelligence coverage. The first real sources were being established, although no one penetrated the upper tier of the Al Qaeda leadership itself. As the year progressed, plans were drawn up and slowly worked their way up to the White House on 4 September 2001-which involved increasing dramatically support for Massoud. MI6 were involved in these plans.

=== War on terror ===
During the Global War on Terror, SIS accepted information from the CIA that was obtained through torture, including the extraordinary rendition programme. Craig Murray, a UK ambassador to Uzbekistan, had written several memos critical of the UK's acceptance of this information; he was then sacked from his job.

==== Afghanistan and Iraq ====
Following the September 11 attacks, on 28 September the British Foreign Secretary approved the deployment of MI6 officers to Afghanistan and the wider region, using people involved with the mujahadeen in the 1980s and who had language skills and regional expertise. At the end of the month, a handful of MI6 officers with a budget of $7 million landed in northeast Afghanistan, where they met with General Mohammed Fahim of the Northern Alliance and began working with other contacts in the north and south to build alliances, secure support, and to bribe as many Taliban commanders as they could to change sides or leave the fight.

During the United States invasion of Afghanistan, the SIS established a presence in Kabul following its fall to the coalition. MI6 members and the British Special Boat Service took part in the Battle of Tora Bora. After members of the 22nd Special Air Service (SAS) Regiment returned to the UK in mid-December 2001, members of both territorial SAS regiments remained in the country to provide close protection to SIS members.

In mid-December, MI6 officers who had been deployed to the region began to interview prisoners held by the Northern Alliance. In January 2002, they began interviewing prisoners held by the Americans. On 10 January 2002, an MI6 officer conducted his first interview of a detainee held by the Americans. He reported back to London that there were aspects of how the detainee had been handled by the US military before the interview that did not seem consistent with the Geneva Conventions.

Two days after the interview, he was sent instructions, copied to all MI5 and MI6 officers in Afghanistan, about how to solve concerns over mistreatment, referring to signs of abuse: "Given that they are not within our custody or control, the law does not require you to intervene to protect this." It went on to say that the Americans had to understand that the UK did not condone such mistreatment and that a complaint should be made to a senior US official if there was any coercion by the US in conjunction with an MI6 interview.

Prior to the 2003 invasion of Iraq, allegations were made that some SIS members conducted Operation Mass Appeal, which was a campaign to plant stories about Iraq's WMDs in the media. The operation was exposed in The Sunday Times in December 2003. Claims by former weapons inspector Scott Ritter suggest that similar propaganda campaigns against Iraq dated back to the 1990s. Ritter says that SIS recruited him in 1997 to help with the propaganda effort, saying "the aim was to convince the public that Iraq was a far greater threat than it actually was."

Towards the end of the invasion, SIS officers operating out of Baghdad International Airport with Special Air Service (SAS) protection, began to re-establish a station in Baghdad and began gathering intelligence, in particular on WMDs. After it became clear that Iraq did not possess any WMDs, MI6 officially withdrew pre-invasion intelligence about them. In the months after the invasion, they also began gathering political intelligence; predicting what would happen in post-Baathist Iraq. MI6 personnel in the country never exceeded 50; in early 2004, apart from supporting Task Force Black in hunting down former senior Ba'athist party members, MI6 also made an effort to target "transnational terrorism"/jihadist networks that led to the SAS carrying out Operation Aston in February 2004: They conducted a raid on a house in Baghdad that was part of a "jihadist pipeline" that ran from Iran to Iraq that US and UK intelligence agencies were tracking suspects on – the raid captured members of Pakistan based terrorist group.

Shortly before the Second Battle of Fallujah, MI6 personnel visited JSOCs TSF (Temporary Screening Facility) at Balad Air Base to question a suspected insurgent. Afterwards, they raised concerns about the poor detention conditions there. As a result, the British government informed JSOC in Iraq that prisoners captured by British special forces would only be turned over to JSOC if there was an undertaking not to send them to Balad. In spring 2005, the SAS detachment operating in Basra and southern Iraq, known as Operation Hathor, escorted MI6 case officers into Basra so they could meet their sources and handlers. MI6 provided information that enabled the detachment to carry out surveillance operations. MI6 were also involved in resolving the Basra prison incident; the SIS played a central role in the British withdrawal from Basra in 2007.

In Afghanistan, MI6 worked closely with the military, delivering tactical information and working in small cells alongside Special Forces, surveillance teams, and GCHQ to track individuals from the Taliban and Al Qaeda.

The first MI6 knew of the US carrying out the mission that killed Osama bin Laden on 2 May 2011 was after it happened, when its chief called his American counterpart for an explanation. In July 2011 it was reported that SIS had closed several of its stations, particularly in Iraq, where it had several outposts in the south of the country in the region of Basra. The closures have allowed the service to focus its attention on Pakistan and Afghanistan, which are its principal stations. On 12 July 2011, MI6 intelligence officers, along with other intelligence agencies, tracked two British-Afghans to a hotel in Herat, Afghanistan, who were discovered to be trying to establish contact with the Taliban or al-Qaeda to learn bomb-making skills; operators from the SAS captured them and they are believed to be the first Britons to be captured alive in Afghanistan since 2001.

By 2012, MI6 had reorganised after 9/11 and reshuffled its staff, opening new stations overseas, with Islamabad becoming the largest station. MI6's increase in funding was not as large as that for MI5, and it still struggled to recruit at the required rate; former members were rehired to help out. MI6 maintained intelligence coverage of suspects as they moved from the UK overseas, particularity to Pakistan.

In October 2013, SIS appealed for reinforcements and extra staff from other intelligence agencies amid growing concern about a terrorist threat from Afghanistan and that the country would become an "intelligence vacuum" after British troops withdraw at the end of 2014.

In March 2016, it was reported that MI6 had been involved in the Libyan Civil War since January of that year, having been escorted by the SAS to meet with Libyan officials to discuss the supplying of weapons and training for the Syrian Army and the militias fighting against ISIS. In April 2016, it was revealed that MI6 teams with members of the Special Reconnaissance Regiment seconded to them had been deployed to Yemen to train Yemeni forces fighting AQAP, as well as identifying targets for drone strikes. In November 2016, The Independent reported that MI6, MI5 and GCHQ supplied the SAS and other British special forces a list of 200 British jihadists to kill or capture before they attempt to return to the UK. The jihadists are senior members of ISIS who pose a direct threat to the UK. Sources said SAS soldiers have been told that the mission could be the most important in the regiment's 75-year history.

=== Other activities ===
==== Operations in the Balkans ====
On 6 May 2004 it was announced that Sir Richard Dearlove was to be replaced as head of SIS by John Scarlett, former chairman of the Joint Intelligence Committee. Scarlett was an unusually high-profile appointment to the job, and gave evidence at the Hutton Inquiry.

On 27 September 2004, news emerged of a significant incident involving British intelligence officers in the Balkans. It was reported that several British spies operating in the region, including SIS officers stationed in Belgrade and Sarajevo, were either relocated or compelled to withdraw from their posts. This development was a consequence of their public identification in various media reports, a situation that arose due to the actions of disgruntled local intelligence services, especially in Croatia and Serbia. Two British intelligence officers stationed in Zagreb managed to maintain their positions despite having their covers exposed in the local press. This revelation of the agents' identities in the three capital cities significantly undermined British intelligence operations.

The primary focus of British intelligence activities in the Balkans included efforts by the SIS to capture individuals sought by the International Criminal Tribunal for the Former Yugoslavia in The Hague, most notably, alleged war criminals.

A critical aspect of the issue was the nature of MI6's operations in the region. Instead of running a traditional spy network, MI6 was perceived as a network of influence within Balkan security services and the media. This approach appeared to unsettle local intelligence agencies, leading to their frustration and resentment. The director of the International Crisis Group in Serbia and Bosnia noted that this approach had seriously irritated some of these agencies. The situation was particularly pronounced in Serbia, where the SIS station chief was compelled to leave his post in August 2004. This forced departure resulted from a campaign against him, orchestrated by the country's DB intelligence agency. The station chief had been engaged in investigating the 2003 assassination of the reformist prime minister, Zoran Djindjic, which had garnered him few allies in the process.

On 15 November 2006, SIS allowed an interview with current operations officers for the first time. The interview was on the Colin Murray Show on BBC Radio 1. The two officers (one male and one female) had their voices disguised for security reasons. The officers compared their real experience with the fictional portrayal of SIS in the James Bond films. While denying that there ever existed a "licence to kill" and reiterating that SIS operated under British law, the officers confirmed that there is a 'Q'-like figure who is head of the technology department, and that their director is referred to as 'C'. The officers described the lifestyle as quite glamorous and very varied, with plenty of overseas travel and adventure, and described their role primarily as intelligence gatherers, developing relationships with potential sources.

Sir John Sawers became head of the SIS in November 2009, the first outsider to head SIS in more than 40 years. Sawers came from the Diplomatic Service, previously having been the British Permanent Representative to the United Nations.

On 7 June 2011, John Sawers received Romania's President Traian Băsescu and George-Cristian Malor, the head of the Serviciul Roman de Informatii (SRI) at SIS headquarters.

==== Libyan Civil War ====
Five years before the Libyan Civil War, a UK Special Forces unit was formed called E Squadron which was composed of selected members of the 22nd SAS Regiment, the SBS and the SRR. It was tasked by the Director Special Forces to support MI6's operations (akin to the CIA's SAC – a covert paramilitary unit for SIS). It was not a formal squadron within the establishment of any individual UK Special Forces unit, but at the disposal of both the Director Special Forces and the SIS; previously, SIS relied primarily on contractor personnel. The Squadron carried out missions that required 'maximum discretion' in places that were 'off the radar or considered dangerous'; the Squadron's members often operated in plain clothes, with the full range of national support, such as false identities at its disposal. In early March 2011, during the Libyan Civil War, a covert operation in Libya involving E Squadron went wrong: The aim of the mission was to cement SIS's contacts with the rebels by flying in two SIS officers in a Chinook helicopter to meet a Libyan Intermediary in a town near Benghazi, who had promised to fix them up a meeting with the NTC. A team consisting of six E Squadron members (all from the SAS) and two SIS officers were flown into Libya by an RAF Special Forces Flight Chinook; the Squadron's members were carrying bags containing arms, ammunition, explosives, computers, maps and passports from at least four nationalities. Despite technical backup, the team landed in Libya without any prior agreement with the rebel leadership, and the plan failed as soon as the team landed. The locals became suspicious they were foreign mercenaries or spies and the team was detained by rebel forces and taken to a military base in Benghazi. They were then hauled before a senior rebel leader; the team told him that they were in the country to determine the rebels' needs and to offer assistance, but the discovery of British troops on the ground enraged the rebels who were fearful that Gaddafi would use such evidence to destroy the credibility of the NTC. Negotiations between senior rebel leaders and British officials in London finally led to their release and they were allowed to board HMS Cumberland.

On 16 November 2011 SIS warned the national transitional council in Benghazi after discovering details of planned strikes, said foreign secretary William Hague. 'The agencies obtained firm intelligence, were able to warn the NTC of the threat, and the attacks were prevented,' he said. In a rare speech on the intelligence agencies, he praised the key role played by SIS and GCHQ in bringing Gaddafi's 42-year dictatorship to an end, describing them as 'vital assets' with a 'fundamental and indispensable role' in keeping the nation safe. 'They worked to identify key political figures, develop contacts with the emerging opposition and provide political and military intelligence. 'Most importantly, they saved lives,' he said. The speech follows criticism that SIS had been too close to the Libyan regime and was involved in the extraordinary rendition of anti-Gaddafi activists. Mr Hague also defended controversial proposals for secrecy in civil courts in cases involving intelligence material.

In February 2013 Channel Four News reported on evidence of SIS spying on opponents of the Gaddafi regime and handing the information to the regime in Libya. The files looked at contained "a memorandum of understanding, dating from October 2002, detailing a two-day meeting in Libya between Gaddafi's external intelligence agency and two senior heads of SIS and one from MI5 outlining joint plans for "intelligence exchange, counter-terrorism and mutual co-operation".

==== 2015 onwards ====
In February 2015, The Daily Telegraph reported that MI6 contacted their counterparts in the South African intelligence services to ask for help in recruiting a North Korean "asset" to spy on North Korea's nuclear programme. MI6 had contacted the man who had inside information on North Korea's nuclear programme, he considered the offer and wanted to arrange another meeting, but a year passed without MI6 hearing from him, so the outcome is unknown.

In July 2020, it was revealed that intelligence officials from a number of repressive regimes received training from senior officials of MI6 and MI5. In 2019, an 11-day International Intelligence Directors Course was attended by top intelligence officers from 26 countries, including Saudi Arabia, the United Arab Emirates, Egypt, Jordan, Oman, Nigeria, Cameroon, Algeria, Afghanistan and others. A British academic, Matthew Hedges questioned the UK's training programme for allowing officials of the UAE, where he was detained on false charges and faced psychological torture.

== Personnel ==
=== Selection and training ===
SIS officers are often chosen based on merit and skill from universities and military academies. The chosen recruit then must apply within the United Kingdom, must be a British citizen or have been a resident of the UK for at least ten years. First, all recruits must pass the basic civil service entry exam before being introduced to a panel of SIS officers during an in-depth competency-based interview. If the interviewee passes, a detailed background and security check is performed before a job offer is made.

Training for recruits takes place at Fort Monckton, Portsmouth. The chosen candidates must go through an intense six-month training programme known as the Intelligence Officer's New Entry Course (IONEC). IONEC recruits must learn how to select and handle agents, to operate undercover identity and use tradecraft skills such as dead drops, surveillance and counter-surveillance techniques, secret writing and code writing. These skills would enable the incoming agents to successfully use these techniques during complex missions and operations.

After the training programme ends, recruits will be fully inaugurated as SIS officers. SIS recruits rely on the United Kingdom Special Forces (UKSF) for special operations and basic training, SIS operatives also receive training in firearm use, which includes pistols and submachine guns, although it would be rare for an SIS agent to use or even carry a firearm in the line of duty.

A special programme for recruits, stemming from an ethnic minority or low socio-economic background, a joint SIS, MI5, GCHQ Summer Intelligence Internship is available. If a would-be recruit is in their final (or penultimate) year of university (as of the 2023/24 academic year) that recruit will be chosen by academics to be admitted into the internship.

=== Paramilitary Group ===
There is limited information about E Squadron in the public domain, and it was not until the 1990s that it was officially recognised by the British government. Although the Government has declassified some information about the squadron, details about its operations generally remain secret. Before the 1990s, the group was known mainly by pseudonym The Increment.

Out of all the British special forces units, E Squadron is a branch of the wider UKSF and many of its combatants are hand-picked to work with the SIS. The group is available for undertaking any task at the requirement of the both UKSF Directorate and SIS. It is manned by operators from the Special Air Service (SAS), Special Boat Service (SBS) and the Special Reconnaissance Regiment (SRR).

=== Salary ===
As of April 2024, the salary range for interns and recruits was between £25,000 to £35,000. This would increase about to around £40,000 with the first promotion.

As of April 2024, the starting salary for an agent was £31,807 a year, increasing to £34,385 the second year, with further increases thereafter.

As of April 2024, salaries for SIS agents range from £33,800 to £42,700 a year.

=== Awards ===
MI6 personnel are recognised annually by King Charles III (formerly the Prince of Wales) at the Prince of Wales's Intelligence Community Awards at St James's Palace or Clarence House alongside members of the Security Service (MI5), and GCHQ. Awards and citations are given to teams within the agencies as well as individuals.

== Commemorations ==
2009 was the centenary of the Secret Intelligence Service. An official history of the first 40 years was commissioned to mark the occasion and was published in 2010. To further mark the centenary, the SIS invited James Hart Dyke to become artist in residence. He created artwork for A Year with MI6, a public exhibition marking the centenary. The project saw Dyke working closely with the SIS for a year, both in the United Kingdom and abroad. The Service allowed Hart Dyke access to enable him to undertake the project, sending him on hostile environment courses to allow him to work in dangerous parts of the world, and admitting him into their Vauxhall Cross headquarters. The sensitivity of SIS work required Dyke to maintain secrecy, and his access was carefully controlled.

The works were displayed to the public to promote understanding of the SIS's work, and why their operations must remain secret. The exhibition ran from 15 to 26 February 2011 at the Mount Street Galleries, Mayfair, London. More than 40 original oil paintings and many sketches and studies were exhibited after being screened for security; the content and meaning of some of the paintings was intentionally left ambiguous.

== Notable people ==
- Cambridge Five, a Cold War Soviet spy ring
  - Anthony Blunt (cryptonym: Johnson), MI5 officer and Soviet agent
  - Guy Burgess (cryptonym: Hicks), SIS officer and Soviet agent
  - John Cairncross (cryptonym: Liszt), SIS officer and Soviet agent
  - Donald Maclean (cryptonym: Homer), SIS officer and Soviet agent
  - Kim Philby (cryptonym: Stanley), SIS officer and Soviet agent
- David Cornwell (known as John le Carré), author, former SIS officer
- Andrew Fulton, chairman of the Scottish Conservative Party
- Sidney Cotton, Australian pilot who flew spy missions for MI6 before and during the Second World War.
- Charles Cumming, author
- Paul Dukes, SIS officer and author
- Dick Ellis, SIS officer, author and scholar, deputy to William Stephenson at British Security Co-ordination and credited with setting up the blueprint for Office of Strategic Services
- Ian Fleming, author of James Bond novels, former NID officer
- Graham Greene, author, former SIS officer
- Bill Hudson, SIS agent
- Ralph Izzard, journalist, author, former NID officer
- Horst Kopkow, SS officer who worked for SIS after the Second World War
- W. Somerset Maugham, playwright, novelist, short-story writer, SIS agent in Switzerland and Russia before the October Revolution of 1917 in the Russian Empire
- Daphne Park, clandestine senior controller, former head of station in Léopoldville.
- Duško Popov, a Second World War double agent; he was the key for operations in Nazi Germany and, as an MI6 agent, he was the inspiration for Ian Fleming's James Bond
- William Stephenson, head of the British Security Co-ordination during WWII
- Amy Elizabeth Thorpe, glamorous seductress who gathered information from diplomats during World War II.
- Richard Tomlinson, author, former SIS officer
- Valentine Vivian, Vice-Chief of SIS and head of counter-espionage, Section V
- Gareth Williams, seconded to SIS from GCHQ, died under suspicious circumstances.
- Krystyna Skarbek, aka Christine Granville, agent in Poland and Eastern Europe; later Special Operations Executive agent.
- Aggie MacKenzie, TV presenter and journalist who spent two years working as a secretary for MI6
- Meta Ramsay, former SIS Head of Station, member of the House of Lords
- Sidney Reilly, Ace of Spies, worked for SIS and others

== Buildings ==
=== SIS headquarters ===
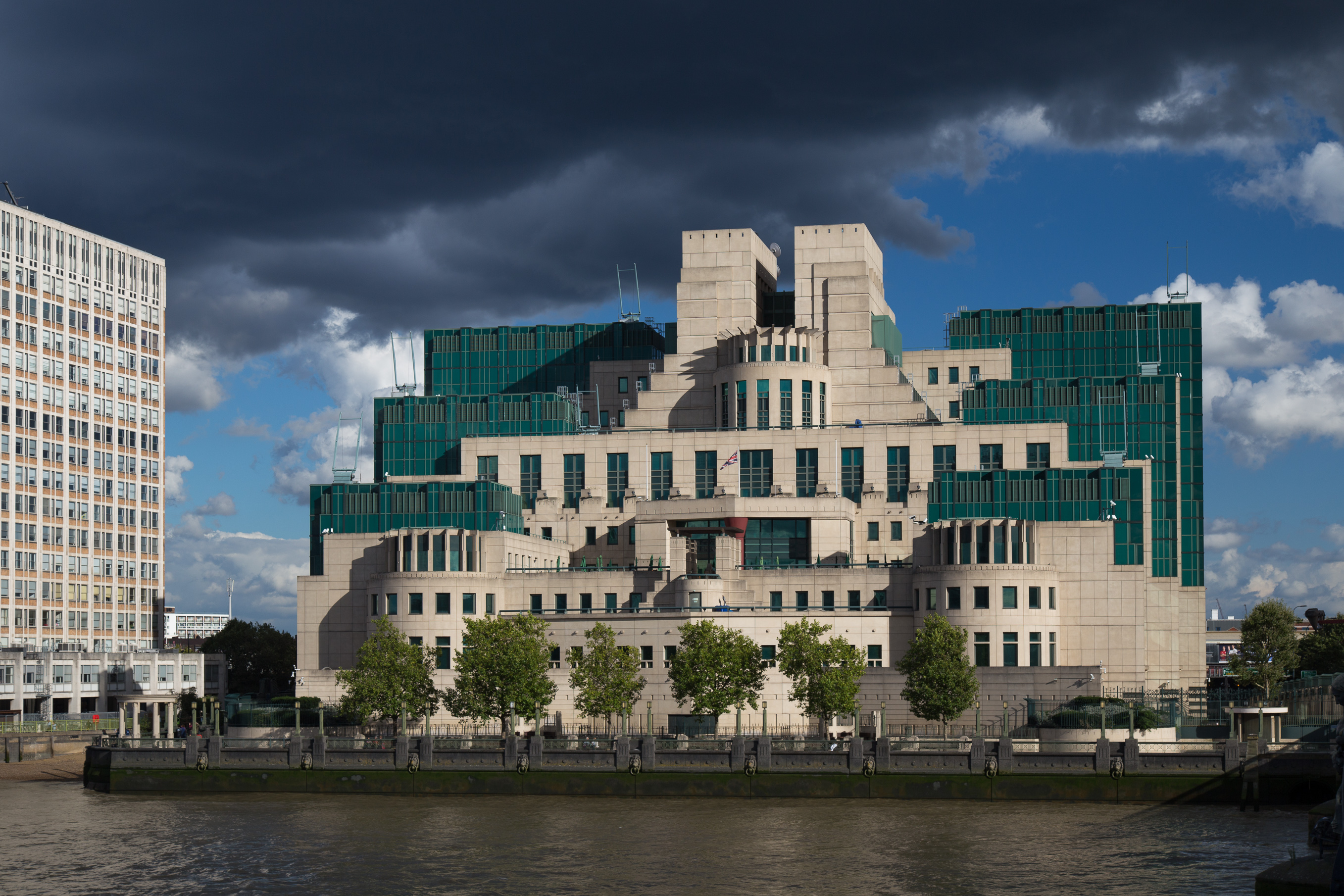
The SIS Building at Vauxhall Cross, south London, seen from Vauxhall Bridge

Since 1995, SIS headquarters has been at 85 Vauxhall Cross, along the Albert Embankment in Vauxhall on the south bank of the River Thames by Vauxhall Bridge, London. Previous headquarters have been Century House, 100 Westminster Bridge Road, Lambeth (1966–1995), 54 Broadway, off Victoria Street, London (1924–1966) and 2 Whitehall Court (1911–1922). Although SIS operated from Broadway, it made considerable use of the adjoining St. Ermin's Hotel.

The new building was designed by Sir Terry Farrell and built by John Laing. The developer Regalian Properties approached the government in 1987 to see if they had any interest in the proposed building. At the same time, the Security Service MI5 was seeking alternative accommodation and co-location of the two services was studied. In the end, this proposal was abandoned due to the lack of buildings of adequate size (existing or proposed) and the security considerations of providing a single target for attacks. In December 1987, Prime Minister Margaret Thatcher's government approved the purchase of the new building for the SIS.

The building design was reviewed to incorporate the necessary protection for the UK's foreign intelligence-gathering agency. This includes overall increased security, extensive computer suites, technical areas, bomb blast protection, emergency back-up systems and protection against electronic eavesdropping. While the details and cost of construction have been released, about ten years after the original National Audit Office (NAO) report was written, some of the service's special requirements remain classified. The NAO report Thames House and Vauxhall Cross has certain details omitted, describing in detail the cost and problems of certain modifications, but not what these are. Rob Humphrey's London: The Rough Guide suggests one of these omitted modifications is a tunnel beneath the Thames to Whitehall. The NAO put the final cost at £135.05 million for site purchase and the basic building, or £152.6 million including the service's special requirements.

On the evening of 20 September 2000, the building was attacked using a Russian-built RPG-22 anti-tank rocket launcher. Striking the eighth floor, the missile caused only superficial damage. The Metropolitan Police Anti-Terrorist Branch attributed responsibility to the Real IRA.

==== James Bond films ====
The SIS Headquarters is featured in the James Bond films GoldenEye (1995), The World Is Not Enough (1999), Die Another Day (2002), Skyfall (2012), and Spectre (2015). The SIS allowed filming of the building itself for the first time in The World Is Not Enough for the pre-credits sequence, where a bomb hidden in a briefcase full of money is detonated inside the building, blowing out an exterior wall. A Daily Telegraph article stated that the British government opposed the filming, but this was denied by a Foreign Office spokesperson. In Skyfall, the building is once again attacked by an explosion, this time by a cyber attack turning on a gas line and igniting the fumes. The blast results in the death of eight MI6 agents, and after the attack, SIS operations are moved to a secret underground facility, later relocating to the War Office Building. In Spectre, the building has been abandoned and is due for demolition. The head of crime organisation SPECTRE, Ernst Stavro Blofeld, traps Agent 007 James Bond alongside the film's Bond girl Madeleine Swann inside the ruins of the building. Blofeld then detonated bombs planted in the building, demolishing what was left of it, though Bond managed to save Swann and escape before the explosion.

=== Other buildings ===
Most other buildings are held or nominally occupied by the Foreign & Commonwealth Office. They include:

- Hanslope Park: on the outskirts of Milton Keynes housing His Majesty's Government Communications Centre, which supports the Foreign, Commonwealth and Development Office and the British intelligence community.
- Fort Monckton in Gosport, Hampshire: a former fort dating from the 1780s, rebuilt in the 1880s, is now the field operations training centre for SIS.
- Special Forces Club: a private club in Knightsbridge catering exclusively to members, both current and retired, of the intelligence services in Britain and abroad, along with the Special Air Service (SAS).

=== The Circus ===
MI6 is nicknamed The Circus. Some say this was coined by John le Carré (former SIS officer David Cornwell) in his espionage novels and named after a fictional building on Cambridge Circus. (In le Carré's universe, "The Circus", the highest command body of the agency, is a metonym for the agency itself.) Leo Marks explains in his World War II memoir Between Silk and Cyanide that the name arose because a section of the Special Operations Executive (SOE) was housed in a building at 1 Dorset Square, London, which had formerly belonged to the directors of Bertram Mills circus.

== Chiefs ==
- 1909–1923: Sir Mansfield Smith-Cumming
- 1923–1939: Admiral Sir Hugh Sinclair
- 1939–1952: Major General Sir Stewart Menzies
- 1953–1956: Sir John Sinclair
- 1956–1968: Sir Richard White
- 1968–1973: Sir John Rennie
- 1973–1978: Sir Maurice Oldfield
- 1979–1982: Sir Dick Franks
- 1982–1985: Sir Colin Figures
- 1985–1989: Sir Christopher Curwen
- 1989–1994: Sir Colin McColl
- 1994–1999: Sir David Spedding
- 1999–2004: Sir Richard Dearlove
- 2004–2009: Sir John Scarlett
- 2009–2014: Sir John Sawers
- 2014–2020: Sir Alex Younger
- 2020–2025: Sir Richard Moore
- 2025–present : Blaise Metreweli

Blaise Metreweli, who took over in October 2025, is the first woman to hold the office of the Chief of the Secret Intelligence Service.

== See also ==
- British intelligence agencies
- List of intelligence agencies
- History of espionage
  - British Security Co-ordination, the WWII operation headed by William Stephenson in the Americas, set up by MI6
- Camp X, training facility in Canada for clandestine operators during WWII
- MI9 – Department of British military intelligence (historical)
