= Peter Wilkinson (diplomat) =

British intelligence officer and diplomat

Sir Peter Allix Wilkinson, KCMG, DSO, OBE (15 April 1914 – 16 June 2000) was a British intelligence officer and diplomat.

== Career ==
Wilkinson served in the Special Operations Executive (SOE) during World War II. He supplied the weapons used by two Czechoslovak agents to assassinate Reinhard Heydrich in 1942. Shortly afterwards, he flew into Bosnia to head SOE's "Clowder" mission, an attempt to find a back door into central Europe through Slovenia and Austria. After the Second World War, he pursued a diplomatic career and ended up as Co-ordinator of Intelligence in the Cabinet Office.

Wilkinson was born in India into the old officer class. His father was killed at Ypres in 1915 while Peter was still a child. He was educated at Rugby and Corpus Christi College, Cambridge. He got a job in the War Office and was with Colin Gubbins in Poland when the Germans conquered it in 1939; he escaped. He escaped again when France was conquered the following year. He then moved with Gubbins into the recently founded SOE.

Wilkinson published an account of the undercover campaigns of SOE during the Second World War in which he described the founding and structure of the SOE, as well as his personal experience as an intelligence officer during the invasion of Czechoslovakia and the Polish Campaign of 1939. The book concludes with an account of the SOE's hazardous attempt under the author's command to infiltrate the Third Reich in 1943–45.

His postwar career was as a diplomat. He was ambassador to Vietnam, 1966–67.

== See also ==
- Krystyna Skarbek
