= Director of GCHQ =

Head of the UK Government Communications Headquarters (GCHQ)

The Director of the Government Communications Headquarters is the highest-ranking official in the Government Communications Headquarters (GCHQ), a British intelligence agency that specialises in signals intelligence, information assurance and cryptography. The director is a Permanent Secretary, and appointed by and reports to the Secretary of State for Foreign and Commonwealth Affairs.

Though the prime minister of the United Kingdom has ultimate responsibility within the British government for security matters and the intelligence agencies, the Foreign Secretary has day to day ministerial responsibility for GCHQ. The Director of GCHQ is also a permanent member of the United Kingdom's National Security Council and the Cabinet Office's Joint Intelligence Committee.

The role of the Director of GCHQ was outlined by the Intelligence Services Act 1994, in which the director is described as "...responsible for the efficiency of GCHQ". The director's role is to ensure:

(a) That there are arrangements for securing that no information is obtained by GCHQ except so far as necessary for the proper discharge of its functions and that no information is disclosed by it except so far as necessary for that purpose or for the purpose of any criminal proceedings; and (b) that GCHQ does not take any action to further the interests of any United Kingdom political party

— Intelligence Services Act 1994

The GCHQ director has become more publicly visible in the wake of the 2013 global surveillance disclosures. Sir Arthur Bonsall, director from 1973 to 1978, was the first director to speak publicly about his career at GCHQ when he was interviewed by the BBC in September 2013, and Sir Iain Lobban testified before parliament's Intelligence and Security Committee in the wake of the disclosures in November 2013. The director from 1989 to 1996, Sir John Adye, had previously spoken as a witness at the inquest into the death of Diana, Princess of Wales in February 2008 to deny that GCHQ had any involvement in the tape recordings that led to the "Camillagate" or "Squidgygate" scandals.

Soon after taking on the role in 2014, Robert Hannigan authored under his own name an article in the Financial Times on the topic of internet surveillance.

== List of GCHQ directors ==
No.	Image	Name	Term
1		Admiral Sir Hugh Sinclair	1921–1939
1		Cmdr Alastair Denniston	1921–1942; Operational head
2		Sir Edward Travis	1942–1952
3		Sir Eric Jones	1952–1960
4		Sir Clive Loehnis	1960–1964
5		Sir Leonard Hooper	1965–1973
6		Sir Arthur Bonsall	1973–1978
7		Sir Brian John Maynard Tovey	1978–1983
8		Sir Peter Marychurch	1983–1989
9		Sir John Anthony Adye	1989–1996
10		Sir David Omand	1996–1997
11		Sir Kevin Tebbit	1998
12		Sir Francis Richards	1998–2003
13		Sir David Pepper	2003–2008
14		Sir Iain Lobban	2008–2014
15		Robert Hannigan	2014–2017
16		Sir Jeremy Fleming	2017–2023
17		Anne Keast-Butler	2023–present

== See also ==
- Director General of the Security Service (MI5)
- Chief of the Secret Intelligence Service (MI6)
