= Bonsall (surname) =

Bonsall is a surname. Notable people with the surname include:

- Sir Arthur Bonsall (1917–2014), British intelligence officer
- Brian Bonsall (born 1981), American actor
- Crosby Bonsall (1921–1995), American artist and children's book author and illustrator
- Elizabeth Fearne Bonsall (1861–1956), American painter and illustrator
- Frank Bonsall (1920–2011), British mathematician
- I. H. Bonsall (1833–1909), American photographer
- Joe Bonsall (1948–2024), American singer
- William Hartshorn Bonsall (1846–1905), Californian businessman and politician
- Will Bonsall (born 1950s), American author, seed saver and farmer

== See also ==
- Peter Bonsall-Boone AM (1938–2017), Australian LGBT rights activist
- Bonsal (disambiguation)
