= Bohr's law (disambiguation) =

Bohr's law may refer to:

- Bohr model
- Bohr effect
- Bohr equation
- Gunslinger effect
