= David Pepper =

David Pepper may refer to:

- Sir David Pepper (intelligence official) (born 1948), British intelligence official, director of GCHQ
- David Pepper (politician) (born 1971), American politician from Ohio
