= Bonsall =

Bonsall may refer to:

- Bonsall (surname)
- Bonsall, California
- Bonsall, Derbyshire, England
- Bonsall Islands, Avannaata municipality, Greenland

== See also ==
- Bonsal (disambiguation)
- Bonsallo Avenue, Los Angeles, California
