= Hendrik Casimir =

Dutch physicist (1909–2000)

Hendrik Casimir ForMemRS
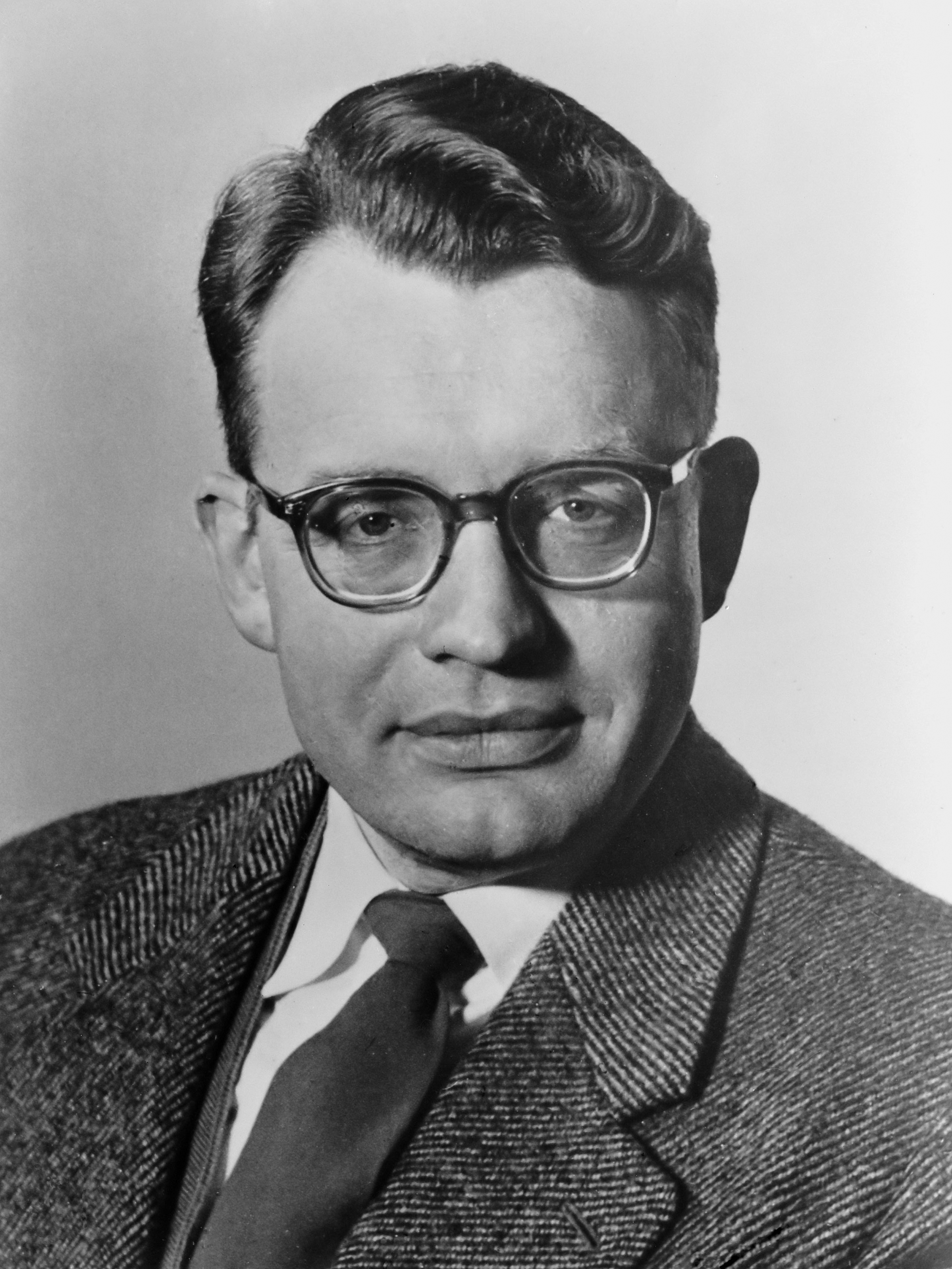
- Casimir in 1958
- Born: 15 July 1909; The Hague, Netherlands
- Died: 4 May 2000 (aged 90); Heeze, Netherlands
- Education: University of Leiden
- Known for: Casimir effect Casimir invariant Casimir–Polder force Gorter–Casimir model
- Awards: George E. Pake Prize (1999); Matteucci Medal (1985); Wilhelm Exner Medal (1982); Pour le Mérite (1982); IRI Medal (1976); ForMemRS (1970); Fritz London Memorial Lecture (1958)
- Scientific career
- Fields: Physics
- Workplaces: University of Leiden; Philips Natuurkundig Laboratorium
- Thesis: Rotation of a rigid body in quantum mechanics (1931)
- Doctoral advisor: Paul Ehrenfest
- Notable students: Carolyne Van Vliet

Hendrik Brugt Gerhard Casimir ForMemRS (15 July 1909 – 4 May 2000) was a Dutch physicist who made significant contributions to the field of quantum mechanics and quantum electrodynamics. He is best known for his work on the Casimir effect, which describes the attractive force between two uncharged plates in a vacuum due to quantum fluctuations of the electromagnetic field.

Hendrik Casimir is also known for his research on the two-fluid model of superconductors (together with C. J. Gorter) in 1934.

== Biography ==
Casimir was born 15 July 1909. He studied theoretical physics at the University of Leiden under Paul Ehrenfest, where he received his Ph.D. in 1931. His Ph.D. thesis dealt with the quantum mechanics of a rigid spinning body and the group theory of the rotations of molecules. During that time he also spent some time in Copenhagen with Niels Bohr, where he helped Bohr support the latter's hypothesis of the gunslinger effect with mock shoot-outs on campus.

From 1932 to mid-1933, Casimir worked as an assistant to Wolfgang Pauli at ETH Zurich. During this period, he worked on the relativistic theory of the electron, in particular, evaluating deviations of the Klein-Nishina equation in the case of bound electrons. To attack the problem, he invented a number of mathematical tools. One in particular is still referred to as the "Casimir trick": in particle interaction calculations, it is a familiar procedure of trace formation and projections using products of Dirac matrices.

In 1938, Casimir became a physics professor at Leiden University. At that time, he was actively studying both heat conduction and electrical conduction, and contributed to the attainment of millikelvin temperatures.

In 1942, during World War II, Casimir moved to the Philips Natuurkundig Laboratorium (Philips Physics Laboratory, NatLab) in Eindhoven, the Netherlands. He remained an active scientist and in 1945 wrote a well-known paper on Lars Onsager's principle of microscopic reversibility. He became a co-director of Philips NatLab in 1946 and a member of the board of directors of the company in 1956. He retired from Philips in 1972.

Although he spent much of his professional life in industry, Hendrik Casimir was one of the great Dutch theoretical physicists. Casimir made many contributions to science during his years in research from 1931 to 1950. These contributions include: pure mathematics, Lie groups (1931); hyperfine structure, calculation of nuclear quadrupole moments, (1935); low temperature physics, magnetism, thermodynamics of superconductors, paramagnetic relaxation (1935–1942); applications of Onsager's theory of irreversible phenomena (1942–1950). He helped found the European Physical Society and became its president from 1972 till 1975. In 1979 he was one of the key speakers at CERN's 25th anniversary celebrations. In 1946 he became member of the Royal Netherlands Academy of Arts and Sciences.

While at Philips NatLab, in 1948 Casimir, collaborating with Dirk Polder, predicted the quantum mechanical attraction between conducting plates now known as the Casimir effect, which has important consequences in Micro Electro-Mechanical Systems (MEMS), among others.

He was awarded six honorary doctor degrees by universities outside the Netherlands. He received numerous awards and prizes, among them the illustrious IRI Medal from the Industrial Research Institute in 1976. He was a Foreign Associate of the National Academy of Engineering. In 1982, he was awarded the Wilhelm Exner Medal. He was an elected member of the American Academy of Arts and Sciences, the United States National Academy of Sciences, and the American Philosophical Society.

== Publications ==
- Casimir, H. B. G. (1940). Magnetism and Very Low Temperatures. Cambridge, UK: Cambridge University Press.
- H. B. G. Casimir, Haphazard Reality: half a century of science (Harper & Row, New York, 1983); Casimir's autobiography in English. ISBN 0-06-015028-9
- H. B. G. Casimir, Het toeval van de werkelijkheid: Een halve eeuw natuurkunde (Meulenhof, Amsterdam, 1992); Casimir's autobiography in Dutch. ISBN 90-290-9709-4
- Casimir, H. B. G.; Polder, D. (15 February 1948). "The Influence of Retardation on the London-van der Waals Forces". Physical Review. 73 (4). American Physical Society (APS): 360–372. Bibcode:1948PhRv...73..360C. doi:10.1103/physrev.73.360. ISSN 0031-899X.
- H. B. G. Casimir, On the attraction between two perfectly conducting plates, Proceedings of the Royal Netherlands Academy of Arts and Sciences, Vol. 51, pp. 793–795 (1948).
- H. B. G. Casimir, and J. Ubbink, "The Skin Effect", "Philips Technical Review", Vol. 28, pp; 300–315 (1967)
