= John Adye =

British cryptographer

Sir John Adye KCMG
- Born: 24 October 1939 (age 86), Liverpool, Merseyside, England
- Education: Lincoln College, Oxford
- Occupation: Intelligence officer
- Spouse(s): Lady Anne Adye (m, 1961)

Sir John Anthony Adye KCMG (born 24 October 1939) is a former Director of the British signals intelligence agency, GCHQ, a post he held from 1989 to 1996.

== Career ==
Adye was born to Arthur Francis Capel Adye and Hilda Marjorie (née Elkes). Adye was educated at Leighton Park School and Lincoln College, Oxford, receiving a degree in Mods and Greats. Adye joined GCHQ in 1962, becoming Director in 1989. As Director, Adye oversaw GCHQ`s response to the dissolution of the Soviet Union and the end of the Cold War. After retiring from GCHQ in 1996, he served as the chair of the Country Houses Association until 2002. In 1993 Adye was appointed Knight Commander of the Order of St Michael and St George. In 2005 he was appointed to the board of the US National Biometric Security Project.

Adye was a witness in February 2008 at the inquest into the death of Diana, Princess of Wales: in an unprecedented move (normal policy is neither to confirm nor deny operational activities), he strenuously denied that GCHQ had any involvement in either the Camillagate or Squidgygate tapes.

Government offices
Preceded by Sir Peter Marychurch	Director of GCHQ; 1989–1996	Succeeded by Sir David Omand
