= List of fellows of the Royal Society elected in 1970 =

A list of fellows of the Royal Society elected in 1970.

== Fellows ==
1. Cyril Clifford Addison
2. Frank Featherstone Bonsall
3. Colin Gasking Butler
4. Raymond Casey
5. Sir Cyril Astley Clarke
6. John Flavell Coales
7. Leonard Francis La Cour
8. Alexander Edgar Douglas
9. Colin Eaborn
10. Ian Michael Glynn
11. Sir Francis Graham-Smith
12. John Heslop-Harrison
13. John Malcolm Hirst
14. Vernon Martin Ingram
15. John Conrad Jaeger
16. John Leonard Jinks
17. Brian David Josephson
18. Oleg Alexander Kerensky
19. Norman Bertram Marshall
20. Mambillikalathil Govind Kumar Menon
21. Ricardo Miledi
22. Jacques Francis Albert Pierre Miller
23. Stanley Miles Partridge
24. Sir John Shipley Rowlinson
25. Sir Archibald Edward Russell
26. Robert William Stewart
27. John Bryan Taylor
28. David Arthur John Tyrrell
29. Eric John Underwood
30. John Paul Wild
31. Charles Gorrie Wynne
32. Vero Copner Wynne-Edwards

== Foreign members ==
1. Hendrik Brugt Gerhard Casimir
2. Joachim August Wilhelm Hammerling
3. Arthur Kornberg
4. Eugene Paul Wigner

== Statute 12 ==
1. Hugh Algernon Percy, 10th Duke of Northumberland
