= David Omand =

British civil servant (born 1947)

Sir David Omand GCB
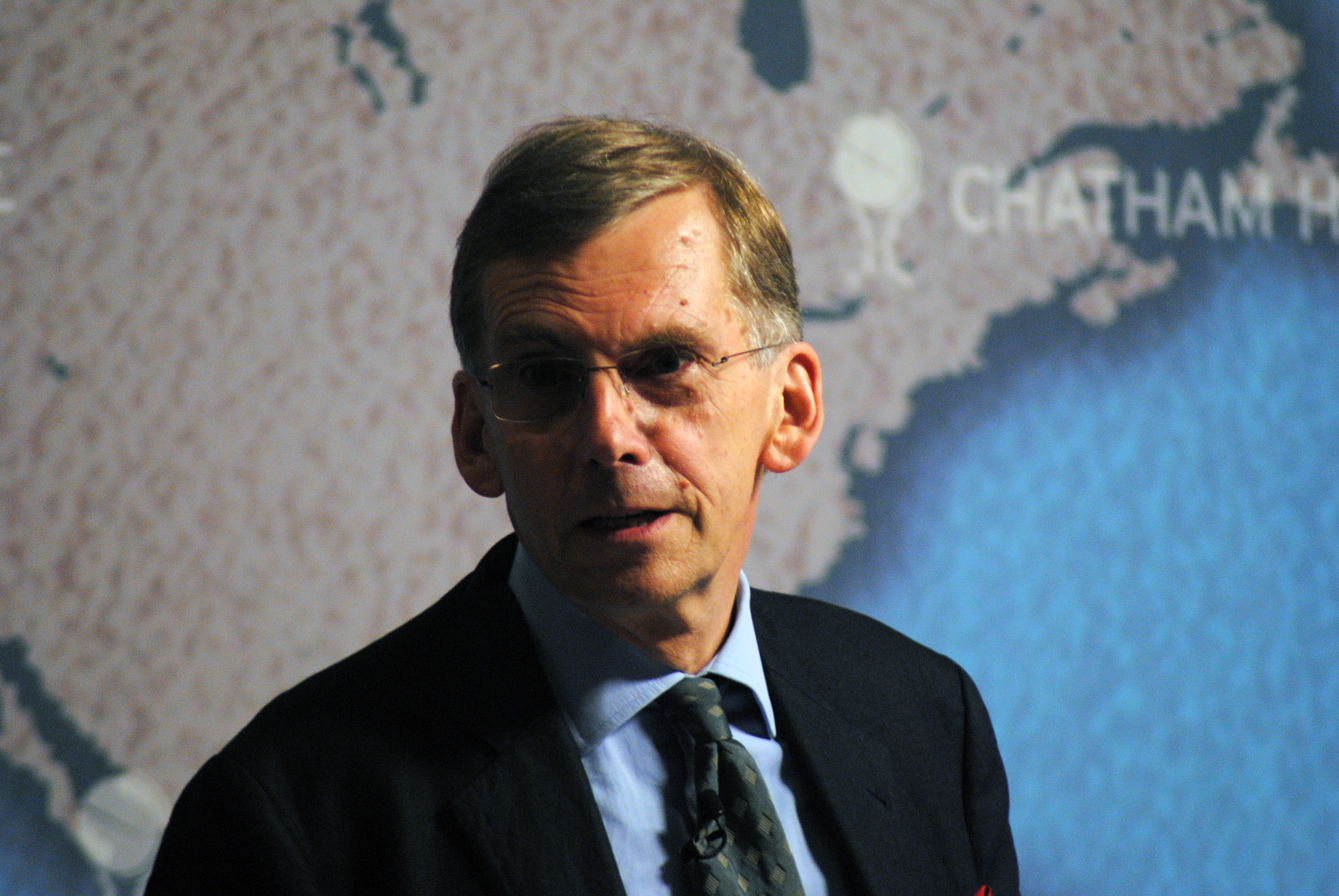
- Professor Sir David Omand at Chatham House, September 2013
- Born: 15 April 1947 (age 79)
- Education: Corpus Christi College, Cambridge

Sir David Bruce Omand GCB (born 15 April 1947) is a British former senior civil servant who served as the Director of the Government Communications Headquarters (GCHQ) from 1996 to 1997.

== Background ==
Omand was born on 15 April 1947. His father, Bruce, was a justice of the peace. Omand was educated at Glasgow Academy and Corpus Christi College, Cambridge, receiving an economics degree.

== Career ==
Omand began his career at GCHQ. After working for the Ministry of Defence for a number of years, Omand was appointed Director of GCHQ from 1996 to 1997. His next post was Permanent Under-Secretary of State at the Home Office.

Omand was appointed a Knight Commander of the Order of the Bath (KCB) in the 2000 New Year Honours. In 2002 he became the first Permanent Secretary and Security and Intelligence Co-ordinator in the Cabinet Office. Omand was among those who decided that David Kelly should be pursued for talking to the media about the Government's dossier on Iraq's alleged WMD. Omand and Kevin Tebbit, then permanent secretary at the Ministry of Defence, recommended to Jack Straw and Tony Blair that John Scarlett become the new head of the Secret Intelligence Service (MI6).

In 2003 Omand participated in the development of the United Kingdom's general counter-terrorism strategy, CONTEST.

Omand was promoted to Knight Grand Cross of the Order of the Bath (GCB) in the 2004 Birthday Honours. He retired from the Cabinet Office in April 2005.

In 2007, he obtained Maths and Physics degrees from the Open University.

In 2009 he was asked by the Home Secretary, Alan Johnson, to carry out a review into the Advisory Council on the Misuse of Drugs to "satisfy ministers" that the council is "discharging the functions" that it is supposed to.

On 20 January 2010, Omand gave evidence to the Iraq Inquiry.

In 2013 he defended the closeness of Britain's intelligence relationship with the US, telling BBC Radio 4's Today programme: "We have the brains. They have the money. It's a collaboration that's worked very well."

Since leaving the government, Omand has landed jobs with several military-related companies. He has been a non-executive director at UK arms company Babcock International and Italian arms company Leonardo-Finmeccanica and has also worked as an adviser to the Society of British Aerospace Companies.

In October 2020, he authored a book, How Spies Think: Ten Lessons in Intelligence, covering his views on long-term intelligence analysis gained from his experience working with British governments from Margaret Thatcher to Tony Blair.

== Links with academia ==
Omand is currently a visiting professor at King's College London and is a vice-president of the Royal United Services Institute. Omand's second book applies the idea of just war theory to intelligence.

In COMEC Occasional Papers Omand wrote about civil-military relationships in 2018.

In October 2020, Omand participated in a TEDx conference in Lambeth, where he spoke about ideas from his book, How Spies Think: Ten Lessons in Intelligence.

In January 2026, the National Centre for Military Intelligence posted a video of Omand in conversation with historian Helen Fry.

== Personal life ==
Omand married Elizabeth Wales in 1971; they have two children. He is a member of the Reform Club. He served a four-year term on the board of the Natural History Museum, London, starting in 2006. He remains a trustee.

Government offices
Preceded by Sir John Anthony Adye	Director of GCHQ; July 1996 – December 1997	Succeeded by Sir Kevin Tebbit
Preceded by Sir Richard Wilson	Permanent Secretary of the Home Office; 1997–2001	Succeeded by Sir John Gieve
Preceded by Dame Mavis McDonald	Permanent Secretary at the Cabinet Office; 2002–2005	Succeeded by Sir Gus O'Donnell
Preceded by none	Cabinet Office Intelligence and Security Coordinator; 2002–2005	Succeeded by Sir Bill Jeffrey as Permanent Secretary, Intelligence, Security and Resilience, Cabinet Office
