= Francis Richards (diplomat) =

British civil servant and diplomat

Sir Francis Richards KCMG CVO KStJ DL
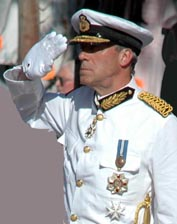
- Sir Francis Richards at the Ceremony of the Keys, Gibraltar

Governor of Gibraltar
- In office 27 May 2003 – 17 July 2006
- Monarch: Elizabeth II
- Chief Minister: Peter Caruana
- Preceded by: Sir David Durie
- Succeeded by: Sir Robert Fulton

Director of the Government Communications Headquarters
- In office July 1998 – April 2003
- Preceded by: Sir Kevin Tebbit
- Succeeded by: Sir David Pepper

Personal details
- Born: 1945 (age 80–81)
- Parent: Sir Brooks Richards (father)
- Education: King's College, Cambridge
- Awards: Knight Commander of the Order of St Michael and St George; Commander of the Royal Victorian Order

Military service
- Allegiance: United Kingdom
- Branch/service: British Army
- Years of service: 1967–69
- Rank: Lieutenant
- Unit: Royal Green Jackets
- Battles/wars: United Nations Peacekeeping Force in Cyprus

Viceregal styles of Sir Francis Richards (2003–2006)
- Reference style: His Excellency
- Spoken style: Your Excellency

Sir Francis Neville Richards (born 1945) is a former British civil servant and diplomat who was Governor and Commander-in-Chief of Gibraltar from 2003 to 2006, and the director of the Government Communications Headquarters from 1998 to 2003.

== Career ==
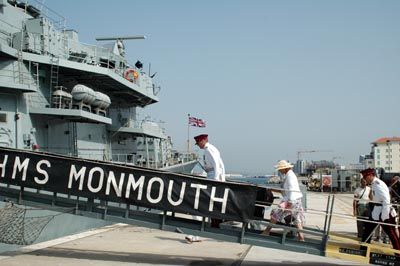
Sir Francis Richards leaving Gibraltar on HMS Monmouth

Richards is the son of Sir Brooks Richards, who served in Gibraltar with the Special Operations Executive during the Second World War, and was later the Cabinet Office's Coordinator of Intelligence in the late 1970s. Francis Richards was educated at Eton and King's College, Cambridge and then commissioned into the Royal Green Jackets, serving with the United Nations Force in Cyprus.

After Richards' army career was cut short by injury, he entered the Diplomatic Service, serving in New Delhi and Namibia and holding a number of senior posts at the Foreign and Commonwealth Office. He was the first High Commissioner of the United Kingdom to Namibia.

He was director of the Government Communications Headquarters (GCHQ) in Cheltenham from 1998 to 2003. On his departure from GCHQ Richards said that the role was "... the best job I have ever had or ever expect to have... but you need to keep things fresh." Richards would later criticise Malcolm Rifkind, the chair of Parliament's Intelligence and Security Committee, saying that it was "not a very good idea" for any former senior minister of the ruling party to chair the committee. Richards questioned whether Rifkind was therefore "well-placed to command confidence" when holding the agencies to account. Richards was the chairman of the trustees of Bletchley Park from 2006 to 2011 and the chairman of the Imperial War Museum from December 2011.

Richards served as Governor and Commander-in-Chief of Gibraltar from 2003 to 2006.

At the end of his term in Gibraltar on 17 July 2006, Richards handed-over the keys to the fortress of Gibraltar, in the traditional 'Ceremony of the Keys', and departed on HMS Monmouth. He was succeeded as governor in September 2006 by Lieutenant General Sir Robert Fulton, a former Commandant General Royal Marines.

An honorary senior fellow at the University of Birmingham, Richards was appointed director of its Centre for Studies in Security and Diplomacy in April 2007. He currently sits on the board of governors at Rendcomb College.

The University of Bath awarded Richards an Honorary Doctorate of Laws in July 2017.

Government offices
Preceded by Sir Kevin Tebbitt	Director of the Government Communications Headquarters; 1998–2003	Succeeded by Sir David Pepper
Preceded by Sir David Durie	Governor of Gibraltar; 2003–2006	Succeeded by Sir Robert Fulton
