= Behind the Enigma =

Book by John Ferris

- Author: John Ferris
- Published: 20 October 2020
- Publisher: Bloomsbury Publishing

Behind the Enigma: The Authorised History of GCHQ, Britain's Secret Cyber-Intelligence Agency is an authorised history of GCHQ, written by intelligence and security expert John Ferris. It was published on 20 October 2020 by Bloomsbury Publishing.

== Reception ==
Lawrence D. Freedman, reviewing from Foreign Affairs, commented that the book's judgement on Bletchley Park's influence was "careful". However, the book's engagement was critiqued by The Guardian, which described it as "deeply technical in places and largely lacking in colour or human drama", despite praising the coverage of intelligence during the Falklands War. The book was also reviewed by The Times and Cryptologia.
