= Anne Keast-Butler =

Director of GCHQ

Director of the Government Communications Headquarters
- Incumbent
- Assumed office May 2023
- Prime Minister: Rishi Sunak; Sir Keir Starmer; Andy Burnham
- Preceded by: Jeremy Fleming

Personal details
- Born: Anne Louise Keast-Butler; 1970 (age 55–56) Cambridge, England
- Children: 3
- Education: Merton College, Oxford
- Occupation: Intelligence
- Known for: Director of GCHQ (2023–)

Anne Louise Keast-Butler (born 1970) is the Director of GCHQ, the UK's intelligence, cyber and security agency. Appointed in May 2023, she is the seventeenth person to hold the role and succeeded Sir Jeremy Fleming.

== Career ==
Keast-Butler joined GCHQ from MI5, where she was Deputy Director General, responsible for MI5's operational, investigative, and protective security work. This has included MI5's – and the allies' – preparation for and response to the Russian invasion of Ukraine.

In her previous Director General role, Keast-Butler was Director General Strategy, leading the enabling functions that support MI5's operational activities.

Prior to this, Keast-Butler spent two years on secondment to GCHQ as Head of Counter Terrorism and Serious Organised Crime and has also spent part of the last decade on secondment in Whitehall. While there, she helped to launch the National Cyber Security Programme.

She was appointed Honorary Colonel Joint Service Signal Unit (Reserves) on 1 December 2024, with a commission as local colonel for the duration of the appointment. She was also made an Honorary Fellow of Merton College, Oxford in 2024.

== Personal life ==
Keast-Butler grew up in Cambridge. Her father was a consultant ophthalmologist with academic roles at the University of Cambridge. She studied for a degree in mathematics from Merton College, Oxford.

She is married, with three children.

Government offices
Preceded by Jeremy Fleming	Director of GCHQ; 2023 – Present	Succeeded by incumbent
