= Tampongate =

1993 revelation of a phone call between Prince Charles and Camilla Parker Bowles

Tampongate or Camillagate was the controversy over a 1989 intimate telephone conversation between Charles, Prince of Wales (later King Charles III), and his then-lover, Camilla Parker Bowles (later Queen Camilla), which was published in the tabloid press in 1993. The tape immediately damaged Charles' public image, and the media vilified Parker Bowles for the breakdown of his marriage to Diana, Princess of Wales. The publication of the tape came only a month after Charles and Diana's formal separation had been announced in the House of Commons.

== Background and context ==
The existence of the tapes became public in November 1992, when the Daily Mirror reported on the recordings and published excerpts. The full transcript was subsequently published in the United Kingdom on 17 January 1993 by the Sunday People and the Sunday Mirror although extracts had already appeared in British newspapers on 13 January. Australian magazine New Idea and a German tabloid had also reported on the matter earlier and published the full transcript. The tapes were of a six-minute telephone conversation between the Prince of Wales and his then-mistress recorded on the evening of 18 December 1989, while Parker Bowles was at her home and Charles was at a friend's country house. The tape suggested the reported sexual intimacy between the two was long-standing.

In the conversation, which was recorded by a radio amateur who happened to detect the call using a high-tech scanning device, Charles and Camilla joked about the then-prince's wishes for an even closer relationship:

Prince Charles: Oh. God. I'll just live inside your trousers or something. It would be much easier!
Camilla: What are you going to turn into, a pair of knickers? Oh, You're going to come back as a pair of knickers.
Prince Charles: Or, God forbid a Tampax. Just my luck!
Camilla: You are a complete idiot. Oh, what a wonderful idea.
Prince Charles: My luck to be chucked down the lavatory and go on and on forever swirling round on the top, never going down.
Camilla: Oh, Darling!
Prince Charles: Until the next one comes through.
Camilla: Oh, perhaps you could come back as a box.
Prince Charles: What sort of box?
Camilla: A box of Tampax, so you could just keep going.

== Reception ==
The general consensus following the publication of the tapes was that Charles had embarrassed the British royal family. According to Diana's bodyguard, Ken Wharfe, in his book, Guarding Diana: Protecting the Princess Around the World, "The backlash was savage. Establishment figures normally loyal to the future King and country were appalled, and some questioned the Prince's suitability to rule." Wharfe also stated that Diana was shocked by the scandal, which prompted her to repeatedly state "It's just sick".

The publication of the conversation led Lord Rees-Mogg, editor of The Times, to suspect that MI5 could be behind the scandal. Shortly before, two other recordings of telephone conversations involving members of the royal family had appeared in the press: one between Diana and her lover James Gilbey (which became known as Squidgygate), and another between Prince Andrew and his wife Sarah, Duchess of York. Lord Rees-Mogg stated:

I think the three tapes mean that there had to be a deliberate surveillance of the Royal Family at that point. I think one has to ask whether it was done as part of the security screening, and whether what has happened is that the Royal Family were being taped as part of MI5's operation, and, in some way, these tapes were leaked.

The publication of the tape and its repercussions were featured in season 5 of the TV series The Crown.

== Bibliography ==
- Brandreth, Gyles (2007). Charles and Camilla: Portrait of a Love Affair. Random House. ISBN 978-0-09-949087-6.
