= Brian Tovey =

British intelligence analyst (1926–2015)

Sir Brian Tovey KCMG

Director of GCHQ
- In office 1978–1983
- Preceded by: Sir Arthur Bonsall
- Succeeded by: Sir Peter Marychurch

Personal details
- Born: Brian John Maynard Tovey; 15 April 1926
- Died: 23 December 2015 (aged 89)
- Children: 4
- Education: St Edmund Hall, Oxford; School of Oriental and African Studies

Sir Brian John Maynard Tovey KCMG (15 April 1926 – 23 December 2015) was a British intelligence analyst who was director of the British signals intelligence agency, GCHQ, a post he held from 1978 to 1983.

== Career ==
Born in London, Tovey was educated at St Edward's School, Oxford, St Edmund Hall, Oxford and the School of Oriental and African Studies, where he studied modern Chinese. After national service in the Royal Navy, Tovey joined GCHQ in 1950. He was thus the first GCHQ director not to have worked at Bletchley Park. He was knighted in 1980.

Tovey's tenure as director at GCHQ was not an easy one: industrial action in 1981 led later to the banning of trades unions from GCHQ. The decision was also taken to inaugurate the controversial Zircon satellite project.

Following his retirement from GCHQ, Tovey became a consultant advising firms including Plessey on dealing with Government departments. He served during this time as the chair of the Joint Electronics and Telecommunications Security Export Control Committee (JETSECC) of the Federation of the Electronics Industry. Later he was the founding chairman of the UK Mind Sports Olympiad, and Chairman of the Board of Directors of the Learning Skills Foundation and Trustee of the Naval and Military Club.

Tovey maintained an interest in Italian art of the 13th to 17th centuries. He worked on a biography of the life and times of Filippo Baldinucci. It is alleged that while he was Director of GCHQ, Tovey shared this interest with the head of the French SDECE, Alexandre de Marenches, and as a result GCHQ gained valuable intelligence on the war in Afghanistan.

== Personal life ==
Tovey was married four times. In 1949, he married Elizabeth Christopher. They had four children; three daughters and a son. One of his daughters is Helen Fulton, Professor of Medieval Literature. They divorced in 1959. He married twice more, in 1961 and 1973, with both marriages ending in divorce. In 1989, he married Mary Lane; she survived him.

Government offices
Preceded by Sir Arthur Bonsall	Director of GCHQ; 1978–1983	Succeeded by Sir Peter Marychurch
