= Jeremy Fleming =

Director of GCHQ from 2017 to 2023

Sir Jeremy Fleming KCMG CB
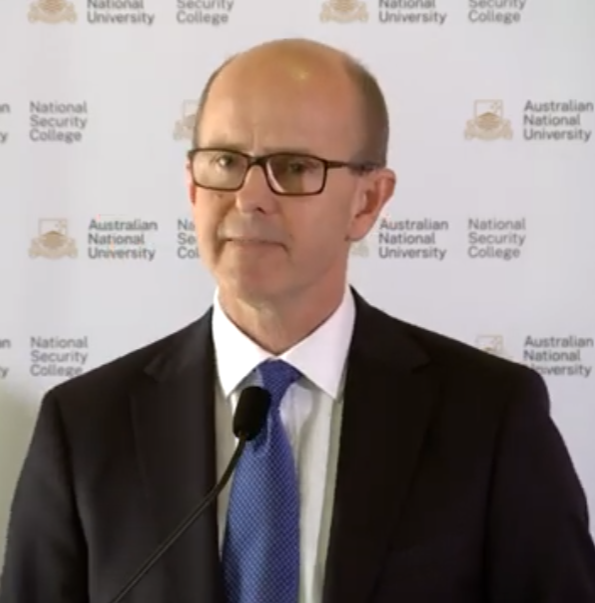
- Speaking at the ANU National Security College in 2022

Director of the Government Communications Headquarters
- In office 10 April 2017 – May 2023
- Prime Minister: Theresa May; Boris Johnson; Liz Truss; Rishi Sunak
- Preceded by: Robert Hannigan
- Succeeded by: Anne Keast-Butler

Personal details
- Born: c. 1966/1967
- Education: University of Bristol
- Occupation: Chartered accountant
- Profession: Accountancy, espionage
- Known for: Director of GCHQ, Deputy Director General of MI5

Sir Jeremy Ian Fleming KCMG CB was the Director of the Government Communications Headquarters, the UK's intelligence, cyber and security agency. He was appointed in 2017 and was the 16th person to hold the role. He left the post in May 2023.

== Education and early career ==
Fleming studied economic and social history at the University of Bristol before training as a chartered accountant in the City of London. He later worked for the government practice arm of Deloitte, and was seconded from there in 1993 to MI5 under the pretext of a role at the Ministry of Defence.

== MI5 ==
His initial role upon secondment was to make MI5's finances more transparent to parliamentary scrutiny. He later gained extensive operational, investigative and leadership experience across the full range of national security work. He helped shape MI5's response to the London terrorist attacks in 2005, led the revision and publication of the Government's counter-terrorism strategy, CONTEST and was promoted to Assistant Director General to lead MI5's preparations for the London 2012 Olympics. He then spent four years as Deputy Director General with responsibility for all investigations and operations.

He was appointed Companion of the Order of the Bath in the 2017 New Year Honours.

== GCHQ ==
In GCHQ, Fleming has overseen the further development of the National Cyber Security Centre with a mission to make the UK the safest place to live and do business online. It has become a world leader in bringing together Government, industry and international partners to address cyber threats and inform the public. Fleming has overseen a significant period of growth in the Agency, with the development of a strategic base in Manchester and a focus on diversity and inclusion. In 2019 he led GCHQ's centenary celebrations with the publication of a landmark official history. And in 2020, a new partnership with the Ministry of Defence was announced to create a National Cyber Force charged with delivering cyber operations.

He was appointed Knight Commander of the Order of St Michael and St George (KCMG) in the 2021 Birthday Honours for services to national security.

He was Honorary Colonel of the Joint Service Signal Unit (Reserves) of the Royal Corps of Signals until August 2023.

=== Notable speeches and interviews ===
==== Cyber ====
In October 2018, Fleming described how the UK must continue to think strategically about its national response to the new generation of technology. As part of the International Institute for Strategic Studies Fullerton Lecture Series in February 2019, he described the concept of cyber power - what that requires of a country, and the rules, regulations and ethics needed to exercise such power responsibly. Fleming built on this the following month when speaking to 29 member states at the NATO Cyber Defence Pledge conference, talking of the need to work together to tackle common threats and to be prepared for cyber attacks against their countries. He stressed that a framework was needed that promotes the responsible projection of a nation's cyber capabilities. In June 2019, he touched on the role of GCHQ and the NCSC in protecting the Digital Homeland of the UK and in particular the work the organisations have done to keep businesses safe online He also encouraged businesses to work with government and academia to help create a more cyber literate population and to invest in the cyber and digital skills for the next generation.

==== Technology ====
In his first public speech at CyberUK in April 2018, Fleming warned that the UK's adversaries were proactively using technology to further their cause and that the threats they face were changing constantly and becoming more complex. Later that year at the Billington Cyber Security Summit he stressed the need to build secure technology in order to keep citizens, economies and societies safe.

In April 2021 Fleming discussed the impact fundamental changes in the tech environment have had on the UK's economy and society, and the way in which the COVID-19 pandemic accelerated those trends at home but also enabled their adversaries in new ways. He also examined the challenges surrounding geopolitical competition in technology, and the need to reform the international approach to cyber and technology for the 21st century.

==== China ====
In October 2022, Fleming warned in an interview of China's use of technology to attack satellite systems, to control digital currencies and to control dissent by tracking individuals. He also expressed concern over China's clientelist development strategies, the potential loss of the West's leadership in certain critical technologies, and its dependencies on Chinese state-linked enterprises.

==== War in Ukraine ====
On a visit to the Australian National University on 31 March 2022, Fleming talked about Russia’s invasion of Ukraine. He paid tribute to Ukrainian cyber security personnel, and pledged continued support.

==== Radio 4 Today Programme ====
In December 2022 Fleming was the Guest Editor on an edition of the Today Programme on BBC Radio 4.

== Other activities ==
Fleming joined Mastercard as a senior security adviser in October 2023.

Government offices
Preceded by Robert Hannigan	Director of GCHQ; 2017 – 2023	Succeeded by Anne Keast-Butler
