= David Durie =

British civil servant

Sir David Durie KCMG KStJ

Governor of Gibraltar
- In office 5 April 2000 – 16 May 2003
- Monarch: Elizabeth II
- Chief Minister: Peter Caruana
- Preceded by: Sir Richard Luce
- Succeeded by: Sir Francis Richards

Personal details
- Born: 21 August 1944 (age 82) Glasgow, Scotland
- Education: University of Oxford
- Awards: Knight Commander of the Order of St Michael and St George

Viceregal styles of Sir David Durie (2000–2003)
- Reference style: His Excellency
- Spoken style: Your Excellency

Sir David Robert Campbell Durie, KCMG KStJ (born 21 August 1944) is a retired British civil servant, whose last major public appointment was as Governor of Gibraltar.

== Early life ==
Born into a family with a military tradition, Durie grew up in Scotland. Together with his twin brother, Ian (1944–2005), Durie was educated at Fettes College. He read Natural Sciences at the University of Oxford.

== Career ==
Durie joined the Ministry of Technology in 1966 before going on to work in various posts at the OECD, the Cabinet Office and the Department of Trade and Industry. In 1991 he became Minister and Deputy UK Permanent Representative to the European Community in Brussels and in 1995 he returned to the Department of Trade and Industry before leaving the Home Civil Service in 2000.

He served as Governor of Gibraltar from 2000 to 2003.

He is a former Governor of The Queen's School, Kew.

== Personal life ==
Durie lives in Kew, London. He is married to Susan (née Weller), and has three daughters.

== Honours and awards ==
Durie was appointed a Companion of the Order of St Michael and St George (CMG) in the 1995 New Year Honours, and promoted to a Knight Commander of the same Order (KCMG) in the 2003 New Year Honours. He was appointed a Knight of the Venerable Order of St. John (KStJ) in 2000. Durie was also invested as Knight Commander of the Royal Order of Francis I (KCFO) by Prince Carlo, Duke of Castro (then Duke of Calabria) in 2003.

Government offices
Preceded by Sir Richard Luce	Governor of Gibraltar; 2000–2003	Succeeded by Sir Francis Richards
