= Peter Marychurch =

British signals intelligence director (1927–2017)

Sir Peter Harvey Marychurch KCMG (13 June 1927 – 21 May 2017) was Director of the British signals intelligence agency, GCHQ, a post he held from 1983 to 1989.

== Career ==
Educated at The John Lyon School, Marychurch served in the Royal Air Force immediately after the Second World War and then joined GCHQ in 1948. According to the memoirs of a former MI5 intelligence officer, in the 1960s, Marychurch, then a young GCHQ cryptanalyst, applied computerised cluster analysis to the problem of traffic analysis of espionage traffic. Marychurch lends his name to the "Sir Peter Marychurch award", an honour given annually for work in international cryptology. He spent several years working at the Government Communications Security Bureau, New Zealand's SIGINT agency. He became Director in 1983 and at the request of the Government continued in that role until 1989.

He also served as the chairman of the Associated Board of the Royal Schools of Music from 1994 to 2000.

He died on 21 May 2017 at the age of 89.

Government offices
Preceded by Sir Brian Tovey	Director of GCHQ; 1983–1989	Succeeded by Sir John Adye
