= Prince of Wales's Intelligence Community Awards =

The Prince of Wales's Intelligence Community Awards (or the Intelligence Agencies Awards) are awards given annually by the Prince of Wales to members of the three intelligence agencies, MI5, Secret Intelligence Service, and GCHQ, of the United Kingdom.

King Charles III conceived of the idea of the awards in 2011, and the format of the awards was agreed by the agencies. The awards are intended to reward people who could never make public their work due to its secret nature. Prince Charles become the inaugural patron of the three intelligence agencies in 2012, at their request. In a 2019 speech given to members of staff at the GCHQ headquarters in Cheltenham Charles said that he had " ... sought to champion and celebrate the remarkable work that you do and the essential role you play on behalf of this country".

The awards are typically held at a lunchtime ceremony in the state apartments of St James's Palace or Clarence House on an annual basis. The awards are typically attended by 200 guests including friends and family members of the recipients. Awards and citations are given to teams within the agencies as well as individuals.
