= RAF Little Sai Wan =

British military facility

- Hong Kong
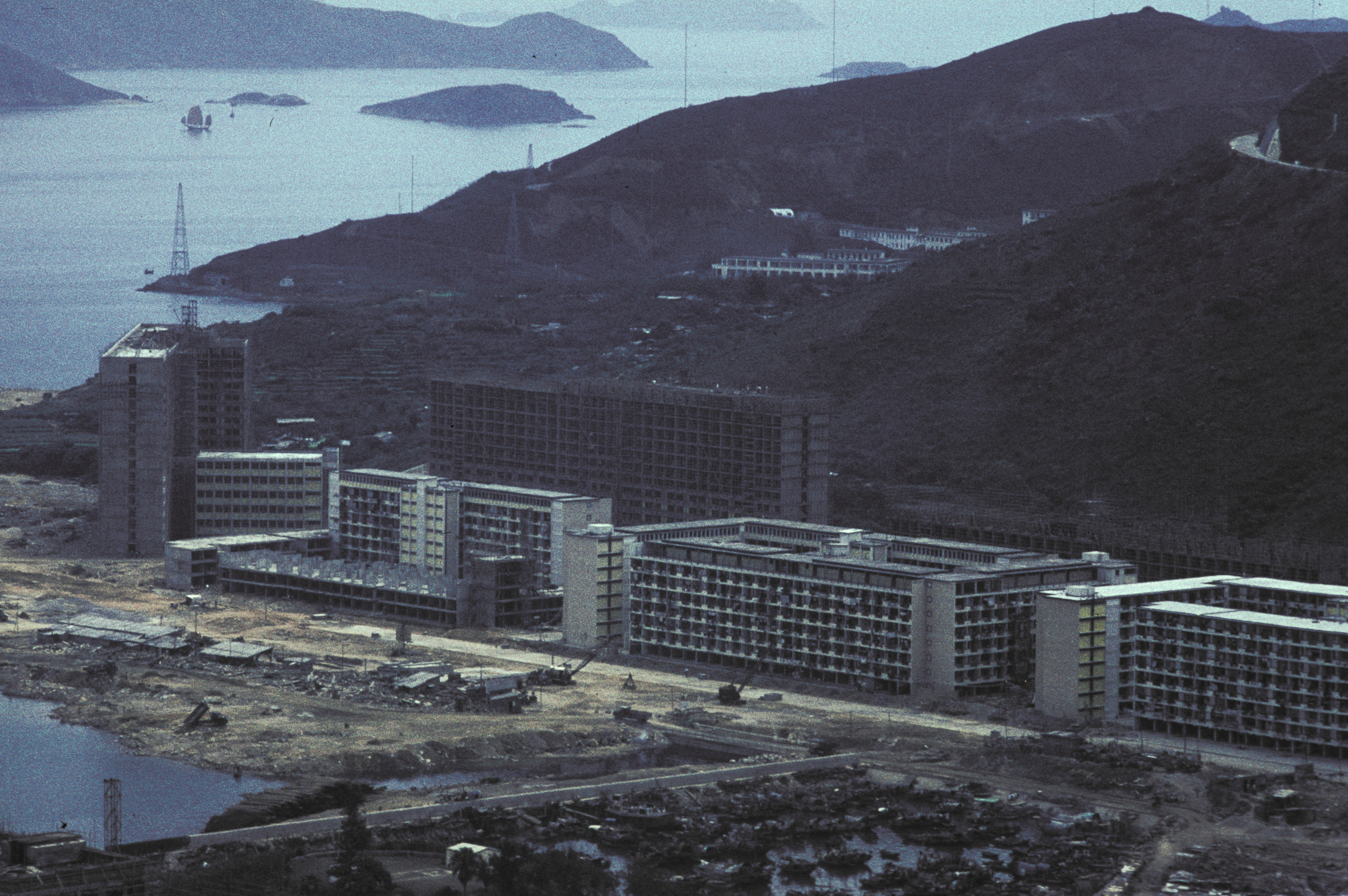
- RAF Little Sai Wan in the background

Site information
- Type: RAF Station
- Owner: Ministry of Defence
- Operator: Royal Air Force

Location
- Location within Hong Kong
- Coordinates: 22.260°N 114.252°E

Site history
- Built: circa 1952
- Built for: War Office
- In use: 1952-1982

Garrison information
- Occupants: 367 Signals Unit

RAF Little Sai Wan was a signals intelligence station in the Siu Sai Wan area of Hong Kong.

== History ==
The station was established by the Royal Air Force as base for 367 Signals Unit in the early 1950s. In 1964, following a review by Sir Gerald Templer, control of the site passed to Government Communications Headquarters. The site was decommissioned and operations consolidated at Chung Hom Kok in 1982.
