= Kevin Tebbit =

British civil servant

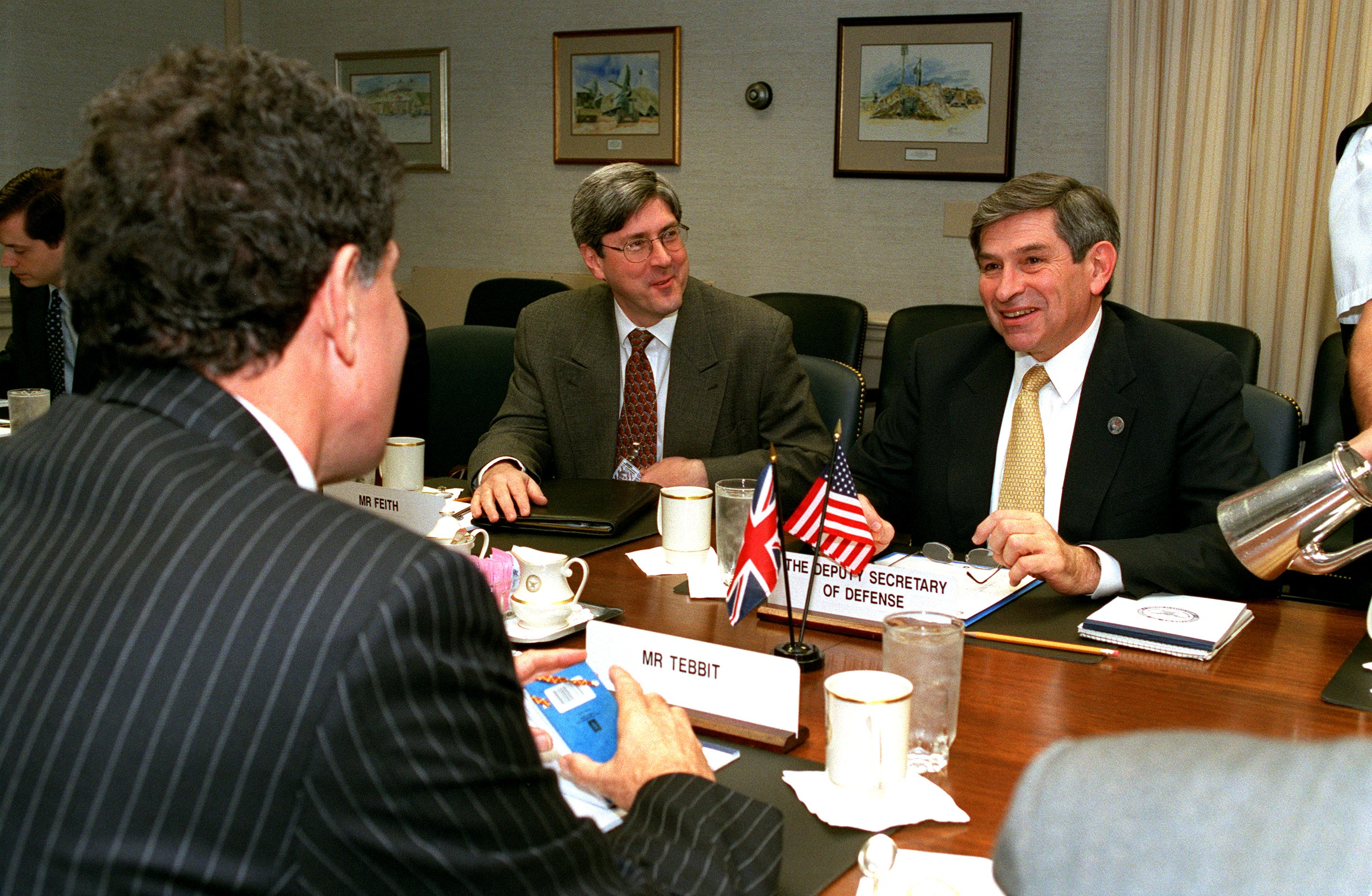
Kevin Tebbit (left) in the Pentagon, December, 2001

Sir Kevin Reginald Tebbit KCB CMG (born 18 October 1946) is a former British civil servant.

== Career ==
He was educated at the Cambridgeshire High School for Boys and was a senior history scholar at St John's College, Cambridge. Tebbit joined the Ministry of Defence in 1969 and in 1972 became assistant private secretary to the Secretary of State for Defence. At the Ministry of Defence Tebbit was concerned with defence plans and policy for Britain's nuclear forces. Tebbit served as the first secretary to the United Kingdom's delegation to NATO, in Brussels between 1979 and 1982. A second posting abroad saw Tebbit join the Foreign Office's East European and Soviet Department, and serve as the head of chancery at the British Embassy in Turkey. From 1987 to 1988 Tebbit was the director of cabinet to the then Secretary General of NATO, Lord Carrington and served as the politico-military counsellor at the British Embassy, Washington from 1988 to 1991.

Upon his return to the United Kingdom in 1992 Tebbit served in a variety of roles at the Foreign Office, including as the head of the economic relations department, director of resources and the chief inspector responsible for finance and organisational planning.

From January to July 1998, Tebbit was Director of the Government Communications Headquarters, the British intelligence agency specialising in signals intelligence and cyber security.

Following this he became the Permanent Under-Secretary of State for Defence before retiring in November 2005 to take up posts in industry and academia.

He is a governor of the conference-organising Ditchley Foundation, based at Chipping Norton. He is also Visiting Professor at The Policy Institute at King's College London. He was a non-executive director of private intelligence company the Smiths Group from 2006 to 2018.

Tebbit gave evidence to The Iraq Inquiry on both 3 December 2009 and 3 February 2010.

Tebbit is a supporter of West Ham United, his hobbies include music and archeology. He is married with two children.

Government offices
Preceded by Sir Richard Mottram	Permanent Secretary of the Ministry of Defence; 1998–2005	Succeeded by Sir William (Bill) Jeffrey
Preceded by Sir David Omand	Director of GCHQ; January – July 1998	Succeeded by Sir Francis Richards
