= Leonard Hooper =

Sir Leonard James (Joe) Hooper KCMG CBE (23 July 1914 – 19 February 1994) was director of the British signals intelligence agency, GCHQ, a post he held from 1965 to 1973.

== Career ==
Educated at Alleyn's School in South East London and Worcester College, Oxford, Hooper joined the Government Code and Cypher School in August 1938, and was based at Bletchley Park during World War II. He stayed on with the organisation after the war, which became GCHQ, and, after five years as deputy director, served as its director from January 1965 to November 1973.

In the mid-1970s he served as the Intelligence Co-ordinator in the Cabinet Office, where he acted as a general overseer of the UK Intelligence Community.

Government offices
Preceded by Sir Clive Loehnis	Director of GCHQ; January 1965 – November 1973	Succeeded by Sir Arthur Bonsall
