= Frank Bonsall =

British mathematician (1920–2011)

Frank Featherstone Bonsall FRS (31 March 1920, Crouch End, London – 22 February 2011, Harrogate) was a British mathematician.

== Personal life ==
Bonsall was born on 31 March 1920, the youngest son of Wilfred C Bonsall and Sarah Frank. His older brother was Arthur Bonsall. He married Gillian Patrick, a Somerville graduate, in 1947. Bonsall and his wife were keen hill-walkers. He wrote two articles for The Scottish Mountaineering Club on the definition of a Munro. After his retirement, Bonsall and his wife moved to Harrogate.

== Career ==
Bonsall graduated from Bishop's Stortford College in 1938, and studied at Merton College, Oxford. He served in World War II, in the Corps of Royal Engineers, and in India from 1944 to 1946.

He lectured at the University of Edinburgh from 1947 to 1948; was visiting associate professor at Oklahoma State University from 1950 to 1951; taught at Newcastle University, with Werner Wolfgang Rogosinski in the 1950s. He taught at the University of Edinburgh, from 1963 to 1984. In 1963, a second chair in Mathematics was established (the Maclaurin chair). Bonsall took up the chair in 1965, but spent the following year as a visiting professor at Yale. In 1966, he was awarded the London Mathematical Society's Berwick Prize.

Despite not himself having a PhD, Bonsall supervised many PhD candidates who knew him affectionately as "FFB".

== Works ==
- Compact linear operators, Yale University, Dept. of Mathematics, 1967
- Frank F. Bonsall, John Duncan, Numerical ranges of operators and normed spaces and of all elements of normed algebras, London Mathematical Society, 1971
- Frank F. Bonsall, J. Duncan, Numerical ranges II, Cambridge univ. press, 1973
- Frank F. Bonsall, J. Duncan, Complete normed algebras, 1973

== See also ==
- Arthur Bonsall
- Berwick Prize
- List of fellows of the Royal Society elected in 1970
- List of mathematicians (B)
