= Squidgygate =

1992 revelation of phone calls made by Diana, Princess of Wales

Squidgygate or Dianagate was the controversy over pre-1990 telephone conversations between Diana, Princess of Wales, and her lover, James Gilbey (heir to Gilbey's Gin), which were published by The Sun newspaper.

In 1992, The Sun publicly revealed the recording's existence in an article titled "Squidgygate" (the "-gate" suffix being a reference for a scandal). During the calls, Gilbey affectionately called Diana by the names "Squidgy" and "Squidge". In the conversation, the Princess of Wales likens her situation to that of a character in the popular British soap opera EastEnders, and expresses concern that she might be pregnant and there is discussion of abortion. The publication of the tapes faced media attention which surrounded Diana's separation, and eventual divorce.

== Recording and publication ==
The tape was published after it was allegedly accidentally recorded by a retired bank manager who was a radio enthusiast.

=== First eavesdropper: Cyril Reenan ===
Cyril Reenan was a 70-year-old retired manager for the Trustee Savings Bank, who lived in Abingdon. He regularly listened in on non-commercial radio frequencies for amusement with his wife. On 4 January 1990, at 9pm, Reenan picked up a conversation occurring between a woman and a man. He recognised the woman's voice as Diana's and began recording. The tape of the recording was 24 minutes long, with one minute of conversation becoming lost.

In January 1990, two reporters from The Sun newspaper met with Reenan in the parking bay of Didcot railway station, where Reenan played them excerpts from a tape without having previously told them what he had recorded. Two days later the journalists were shown round Mr Reenan's home-made eavesdropping studio, in which "Above the scanners was a 1960s-style tape recorder with a microphone dangling down above the scanning equipment so that the couple could tape 'interesting' conversations".

Reenan was quoted as saying he was "so nervous I just want you [the reporters] to take the tape away." He added, "I didn't know what to do with it once I'd got it. I was stuck with it, and I was frightened of it," he was quoted as saying, claiming that if the paper had told him that "the tape was 'dangerous', I would have burned it or scrubbed it out."

Reenan claimed that he had been so worried by the evident security breach that he had first thought of attempting to gain an audience with Diana: "I could have used a code-word, perhaps the nickname Squidgy... I was trying to save her face in a way." However, having thought on it "for a day, at least", Reenan decided that he "would not get to see Diana." So he "rang The Sun instead." Reenan claimed The Sun had warned him he could be prosecuted after they heard of the tape. He had been assured by The Sun that his identity would not be publicly disclosed.

=== Publication ===
Published in The Sun on 23 August 1992, "Squidgygate" (initially called "Dianagate") was the front-page revelation of the existence of a tape-recording of Diana, Princess of Wales talking to a close friend, who later turned out to be Gilbey, heir to the eponymous gin fortune. Gilbey, who initially denied The Sun's charges, was a 33-year-old Lotus car-dealer who had been a friend of Diana's since childhood. Their conversation, which took place on New Year's Eve 1989, was wide-ranging. The tape was 40 minutes long, but The Sun released an edited 30 minute transcript, deciding that 10 minutes of the recording were too risqué for publication. The tabloid also set up a special phone line that allowed about 60,000 callers to hear the contents of the edited 30-minute tape for themselves, at 36 pence per minute.

The tape begins in mid-conversation, with the man asking: "And so, darling, what other lows today?" To which the woman replies: "I was very bad at lunch, and I nearly started blubbing. I just felt so sad and empty and thought 'bloody hell, after all I've done for this fucking family...' It's just so desperate. Always being innuendo, the fact that I'm going to do something dramatic because I can't stand the confines of this marriage [...] He makes my life real torture, I've decided."

The conversation covered topics as diverse as the BBC soap opera EastEnders, and the strange looks that Diana received from the Queen Mother: "It's not hatred, it's sort of pity and interest mixed in one [...] every time I look up, she's looking at me, and then looks away and smiles." Additionally, in view of a fascination with spiritualism that was later to become well-known, Diana was also heard explaining how she had startled the Bishop of Norwich by claiming to be "aware that people I have loved and [who] have died [...] are now in the spirit world, looking after me."

Diana expressed worries about whether a recent meeting with Gilbey would be discovered. She also discussed a fear of becoming pregnant, and Gilbey referred to her as "Darling" 50 times, and as "Squidgy" (or "Squidge") 15 times.

=== Second eavesdropper: Jane Norgrove ===
On 5 September 1992, The Sun announced that the same call had also been recorded by an Oxfordshire eavesdropper, 25-year-old Jane Norgrove, who claimed she had recorded the call on New Year's Eve 1989, but "didn't even listen to it. I just put the tape in a drawer. I didn't play it until weeks later, and then I suddenly realised who was speaking on the tape."

In January 1991, after sitting on the tape for a year, Norgrove approached The Sun. The paper made a copy of her recording, and offered her £200 for her time: Norgrove refused the money, claiming that she "got scared and didn't want to know about it any more." Norgrove claimed: "I wanted to speak out now to clear up all this nonsense about a conspiracy [...] I'm not part of a Palace plot to smear the Princess of Wales." The Sun had initially published the opinions of "a senior courtier [who] claims the tape is part of a plot to blacken Diana's name" and the verdicts of other anonymous Palace staffers, who said that the tape was "a sophisticated attempt to get even by friends loyal to Prince Charles after Diana's co-operation with the book Diana: Her True Story, by Andrew Morton."

Such speculation had not been confined to tabloid newspapers: William Parsons, of anti-surveillance consultants Systems Elite, remarked that the technical and atmospheric requirements for such a recording to be possible (both halves of a cellular telephone call, with equal clarity, when the callers were over 100 miles apart, in different network cells), were so improbable as to arouse suspicion: "My money would not be on somebody accidentally picking it up [...] There is more to this than meets the eye."

Jane Norgrove was adamant: "It was just me, recording a telephone conversation in my bedroom. Nothing more and nothing less than that."

== Context and reaction ==
According to Tina Brown, Diana and Gilbey had first met each other before her marriage to Charles and reconnected in the late 1980s. At the time of publication, the Prince and Princess of Wales, engaged in acrimonious pre-divorce proceedings, were involved in a protracted battle for public sympathy which became known as the "War of the Waleses". The Duke and Duchess of York had separated months before, and now all eyes were on Charles and Diana, the next king and queen, whose marriage had been the subject of rumour for years.

Speculation in the media—and in court circles—reached fever pitch. In his memoirs, Diana's private secretary Patrick Jephson recounts a fraught game of media one-upmanship by the feuding couple: secret briefings to friendly journalists, open collaboration with TV documentaries, and separate appearances at different public events on the same day were just some of the many strategies with which Charles and Diana attempted to force each other out of the limelight. Jephson recalls that the atmosphere at Kensington Palace at the time was "like a slowly-spreading pool of blood leaking from under a locked door."

Throughout 1991 and into 1992, Diana had been secretly collaborating with a previously little-known court correspondent, Andrew Morton, on the book Diana: Her True Story, which revealed in graphic detail the previously hidden disaster that the Waleses' marriage had become. Diana's bulimia, suicide attempts and self-harm were spelt out unambiguously, as were Charles's relationship with Camilla Parker Bowles, and the intrigues of Palace officials in attempting to contain the disintegrating royal marriage.

The Sun faced criticism for their role in publishing the tape. The tabloid offered to donate the profits they made from the scandal to NSPCC, a charity that Diana was a keen supporter of. However the charity turned down the donation.

== Analysis of the tape ==
In 1993, The Sunday Times published the findings of an analysis of the "Squidgygate" tape, commissioned from Corby-based surveillance specialists Audiotel International.

Audiotel concluded that the presence of data bursts on the tape was suspicious. Data bursts ("pips" at intervals of approximately 10 seconds, containing information for billing purposes) would normally be filtered out at the exchange before Cellnet transmission. That these "pips" were present at all was therefore anomalous, but they were also too fast, too loud, and exhibited a "low-frequency [audio] 'shadow'," implying "some kind of doctoring of the tape," said Audiotel's managing director, Andrew Martin, in his firm's report. "The balance of probability suggests something irregular about the recording which may indicate a rebroadcasting of the conversation some time after the conversation took place."

Within a week of the Sunday Times's announcement, a further independent analysis was carried out for the same newspaper by John Nelson of Crew Green Consulting, with assistance from Martin Colloms, audio analyst for Sony International. Their analysis demonstrated convincingly that the conversation could not have been recorded by a scanning receiver in the manner claimed by Reenan. Amongst several relevant factors, there was a 50 hertz hum in the background of the "Squidgygate" conversation together with components in the recorded speech with frequencies in excess of 4 kHz. Neither could have passed through the filters of Reenan's Icom receiver or indeed have been transmitted by the cellular telephone system. The 50 Hz hum was consistent with the effect of attempting to record a telephone conversation via a direct tap on a landline.

Since Gilbey was known to have been speaking from a mobile phone, inside a parked car, this left Diana's telephone line at Sandringham as the source of the recording. Nelson's analysis, written after a visit to Reenan and an examination of his unsophisticated receiving system (which consisted essentially of an Icom wideband scanning receiver and a conventional television antenna), showed that the recording was most likely to have been made as a result of a local tapping of the telephone line somewhere between Diana's telephone itself, and the local exchange. Furthermore, narrow-band spectrum analysis showed this 50 Hz "hum" to consist of two separate but superimposed components, possibly indicating a remixing of the tape after the initial recording. The spectral frequency content of the tape was inconsistent with its supposed origin as an off-air recording of an analogue cellular telephone channel but feasible if the recording had been made via a local-end direct tap.

As well as the strong technical case he made against the recording, Nelson established two other salient points. The first was that Gilbey's mobile telephone was registered to the Cellnet network. Secondly, the Cellnet base-station transmitter site in Abingdon Town, the data channel of which was the only one receivable on Reenan's receiving system at the time of his visit, was not in service at the date of the alleged telephone conversation; it was first commissioned on 3 March 1990. It was therefore not possible that the purported recording could have been made off-air by Reenan or Norgrove in December 1989 or January 1990.

With regard to the data-bursts that had aroused the suspicion of Audiotel International, Colloms and Nelson stated: "We are forced to conclude that these data-bursts are not genuine, but were added later to the tape. They originated with a locally-made recording, and show that an attempt has been made to disguise a local tap by making it appear that it was recorded over cellular radio."

Telecommunications company Cellnet admitted that it had automatically conducted its own internal investigation after publication of the "Squidgygate" transcript, because Gilbey had been speaking on a Cellnet phone. "It is a very sensitive issue if a cellular network has been bugged," said Cellnet spokesman William Ostrom: "We wished to satisfy ourselves exactly what happened." Cellnet's inquiry, claimed Ostrom, had "replicated" the findings of Colloms and Nelson: Cellnet announced that it was "completely satisfied that we can dismiss this as an example of our network being eavesdropped."

== Government reaction ==
Suspicion about responsibility for the "Squidgygate" leak focused on the United Kingdom's security service, MI5. Home Secretary Kenneth Clarke said: "The security services are strictly controlled in their telephone tapping, and I know of no evidence whatever to indicate that they were involved." Such suggestions, he added, were "wild" and "extremely silly."

On the same day as these remarks, members of the Commons all-party Home Affairs Select Committee had their first meeting with Stella Rimington, director general of MI5. Committee member John Greenway MP (Conservative) remarked that the recent "Camillagate" leak "strengthens the case for a parliamentary committee to have responsibility to oversee or scrutinise the work of the security services [...] I suspect that colleagues will want to ask how true the allegations [of MI5 complicity in the 'Camillagate' leak] are, and I suspect that she [Rimington] will refuse to tell us." No record exists of matters discussed at the meeting.

The first major "Establishment" figure to question the official line on "Squidgygate" was Lord Rees-Mogg, the arch-conservative chairman of the Broadcasting Standards Authority. He had proved an early proponent of the "rogue spies" school of thought in January 1993, when he used his Times column to accuse elements within the British security services of being responsible for both the recording and its leak. "All those tapes were made within a month," he wrote. "The most likely explanation is that MI5 did it to protect the Royal Family at a time of danger from the IRA. I don't think there was any sense of wrong-doing, but once they were made there was the danger of a leak."

A few days before Clarke's remarks, the Daily Mirror had run with "Camillagate", an eight-minute tape of Prince Charles engaging in explicit conversation with his mistress, Camilla Parker Bowles. Richard Stott, editor of the Mirror, claimed that the tape had been recorded by "a very ordinary member of the public", although the paper was not allowed to keep or to make a copy of the tape. But The Sunday Times reported that an anonymous freelance journalist from Manchester was known to be attempting to sell a complete copy of the original tape, asking price £50,000. The re-ignition of the controversy over "Squidgygate" had been instantaneous: the date of the "Camillagate" recording was known to be 18 December 1989, just weeks before the "Squidgygate" tape had been recorded.

=== Political fallout ===
Before any investigation into "Squidgygate" or "Camillagate" had begun, Home Secretary Kenneth Clarke told the House of Commons: "There is nothing to investigate. [...] I am absolutely certain that the allegation that this is anything to do with the security services or GCHQ [...] is being put out by newspapers, who I think feel rather guilty that they are using plainly tapped telephone calls."

The Labour Party, then in Opposition, accused Kenneth Clarke of irresponsibility, issuing a statement: "He has to show that he is taking these allegations seriously, otherwise he will be perceived as being unable to control an organisation for which he is responsible."

=== Official position ===
John Major's government eventually published two reports, both of which cleared MI5 and MI6 of involvement in the "Royalgates" tapes. One of these was the annual report of the Interceptions Commissioner, Lord Bingham of Cornhill, who oversaw the intelligence-gathering practices of the security services. Excerpt follows: "[Lord Bingham] was impressed by the scrupulous adherence to the statutory provisions [against misconduct] of those involved in the [intelligence-gathering] procedures." In a clear reference to the "Squidgygate" affair, he commented on "the stories which occasionally circulated in the press with regard to the interceptions by MI5, MI6 and GCHQ," stating that such stories were, in his experience, "without exception false, and gave an entirely misleading impression to the public both of the extent of official interception and of the targets against which interception is directed."

Conservative MP Richard Shepherd called the official reports: "two old buffers saying that in their opinion the security services act with integrity." The National Heritage Secretary Peter Brooke gave MPs "a categorical assurance that the heads of the agencies concerned have said there is no truth in the rumours."

The Queen was so disturbed by the "Squidgygate" episode that she requested that MI5 conduct an investigation to discover the culprit or culprits. Since the motive could not have been financial, said the investigators—the only winners were the radio hams and the press—it must have been political.

In 2002, Diana's former Personal Protection Officer, Inspector Ken Wharfe, stated that the investigation had "identified all those involved, but for legal reasons I cannot expand further, and nor is it necessary to do so." Wharfe added that: "It does [...] lend credence to the Princess's belief, so often dismissed by her detractors, that the Establishment was out to destroy her."

== See also ==
- Diana: Her True Story, a 1993 television film based on the publication of the same name by Andrew Morton, with Serena Scott Thomas as Princess Diana
- James Hewitt
- Queen Elizabeth II's annus horribilis

== Sources ==
- Adams, James: The New Spies: Exploring the Frontiers of Espionage; Hutchinson, London, 1994, ISBN 0-09-174063-0.
- Cockerell, Michael: Live from Number 10: The Inside Story of Prime Ministers and Television; Faber and Faber, London, 1988, ISBN 0-571-14757-7.
- Dorril, Stephen, and Ramsay, Robin: Smear! Wilson and the Secret State; Fourth Estate, London, 1991; ISBN 1-872180-68-X.
- Jephson, Patrick: Shadows of a Princess; HarperCollins, London 2000; ISBN 0-00-711358-7.
- Morton, Andrew: Diana: Her True Story; Michael O'Mara, London, 1993 (2nd edition); ISBN 1-85479-128-1.
- Wharfe, Ken: Diana: Closely Guarded Secret; Michael O'Mara, London, 2002, ISBN 1-84317-005-1.
