= David Pepper (intelligence official) =

British civil servant, former Director of GCHQ

Sir David Edwin Pepper KCMG (born 8 February 1948) is a British civil servant who was the director of the Government Communications Headquarters (GCHQ), the British signals intelligence agency, from 2003 to 2008.

== Career ==
Pepper was educated at Chigwell School and gained a doctorate in theoretical physics from Oxford University. He joined GCHQ in 1972, and worked in intelligence operations. In 1995 he became Director of Administration. In 1998, he transferred to the Home Office, returning to GCHQ in Cheltenham in 2000 as Director of Finance, and taking over the role of Director of GCHQ in April 2003 as successor to Sir Francis Richards. He was succeeded by Iain Lobban in July 2008. Following his retirement from GCHQ, Pepper became a non-executive director of Gloucestershire County Council.

Pepper was director of GCHQ at the time of the 7 July 2005 London bombings and told the subsequent committee into the attacks that they were "a demonstration that there were [deleted] conspiracies going on about which we essentially knew nothing, and that rather sharpens the perception of how big...the unknown unknown was."

It was under Pepper's tenure as GCHQ director that the Tempora data collection programme was instigated, with trials beginning at GCHQ Bude in Cornwall in 2008. Tempora extracts and processes data from international fiber-optic communications. The former Liberal Democrat cabinet minister Chris Huhne described Pepper as a "bureaucratic stickler" and said that GCHQ would not have started the Tempora programme without the approval of government ministers. The Tempora programme was revealed in 2013 as part of the global surveillance disclosures by the former American National Security Agency (NSA) contractor Edward Snowden.

Following his retirement from GCHQ Pepper was a member of the advisory board of the French arms company Thales and a strategic adviser to Defence Strategy and Solutions LLP.

Pepper contributed a chapter to the January 2010 issue of the Public Policy and Administration journal entitled The Business of Sigint: The Role of Modern Management in the Transformation of GCHQ. An extract from his chapter was published in The Guardian in December 2009. In the article Pepper outlined how modern corporate management techniques had been used to change the operating culture of GCHQ following the end of the Cold War.

In the 2011 Mountbatten Memorial Lecture at the Institution of Engineering and Technology, Pepper said that as a result of so much information being accessible through internet search engines the threshold for "producing intelligence" had been "very substantially raised" for the British intelligence agencies. Pepper said that “Nobody wants the easy stuff anymore and there is no point spending effort and money collecting it...Thanks to Google Maps and Streeview anyone can today see photographic detail of far away countries which hitherto would have been available only through secret and highly sophisticated national satellites." Pepper also said, "You can find out a lot about potential spies without ever meeting them, simply by looking at their online footprints."

Pepper was awarded the Order of St Michael and St George (KCMG) in 2005.

Government offices
Preceded by Sir Francis Richards	Director of GCHQ; April 2003 – July 2008	Succeeded by Sir Iain Lobban
