= Bonsal =

Bonsal can mean:

== Places ==
- Bonsal, North Carolina, a community in North Carolina, United States
- Bonsal, Ehekirchen, part of the municipality of Ehekirchen in Upper Bavaria, Germany
- Bonsal Nature Reserve, nature reserve in the township of Montclair, New Jersey, United States
- Bonsal Street, name of discontinuous street in the Bayview (this section is also known as Joseph Lee) and O'Donnell Heights sections of Baltimore, Maryland, United States. The Northern segment runs from the alley north of Bank Street (39°17'22.1"N 76°32'44.7"W) to just south of Eastern Avenue to an unnamed street (in line with Fleet Street to the west) (39°17'11.4"N 76°32'44.2"W). The Southern segment runs between O'Donnell Street (39°16'53.0"N 76°32'41.3"W) and Cardiff Avenue (39°16'35.3"N 76°32'40.6"W). Bonsal Street was formerly known as 26th Street

== Persons ==
- Dudley Baldwin Bonsal (1906–1995), United States federal judge
- Philip Bonsal (1903–1995), United States diplomat
- Stephen Bonsal (1865–1951), United States war correspondent, historian, essayist, diplomat and translator

== See also ==
- Bonsall (disambiguation)
