= Arthur Bonsall =

British signals intelligence director (1917–2014)

Sir Arthur Wilfred "Bill" Bonsall KCMG, CBE (25 June 1917 – 26 November 2014) was director of the British signals intelligence agency, GCHQ—a post he held from 1973 to 1978.

== Early life ==
Bonsall was born in Middlesbrough on 25 June 1917, the eldest son of Wilfred C Bonsall and Sarah Frank.

== Career ==
Educated at Bishop's Stortford College, Bonsall went on to study modern languages at St Catharine's College, Cambridge before joining the Government Code and Cypher School at Bletchley Park.

From 1940, Bonsall served in the German Air Section under Josh Cooper, studying the Luftwaffe. In 1942 he helped to create a series of daily reports known as the BMP (from the initials of its three co-creators, Bonsall, Moyes and Prior). They were based primarily on Luftwaffe radio-telephony and low-grade codes and were issued at Secret Pearl level. Later reports included information from Luftwaffe Enigma traffic and were issued at Top Secret Ultra level. They dealt with the operations of the Luftwaffe defensive organisation and assisted the Allied Air Commands to design their tactics.

Bonsall stayed on with the organisation, which became GCHQ after the war, and served as its director from December 1973 to 1978. He was knighted in 1977. After retirement he served for a period as a tax commissioner. In later retirement he was concerned to preserve a more accurate record of the non-Enigma side of Bletchley Park, especially the work of the German Air Section. The first outcome was a talk given to a Cheltenham Probus club, later developed into a privately printed family memoir entitled 'Another Bit of Bletchley'. In 2007 he presented a paper to a research group in Oxford on Bletchley Park and the RAF Y Service, some recollections. A more formal version of 'Another Bit of Bletchley' was published as no. 17 in the Bletchley Park Trust Report series. This was followed in 2011 by another report, no. 21 in the same series, entitled 'An Uphill Struggle', dealing with the internal battle to overcome Air Ministry failure to understand the value to RAF Commands of tactically derived signals intelligence. He collaborated closely with Wg Cdr John Stubbington in the latter's 2012 account of BMP reports by the German Air Section.

In September 2013, he gave an interview about his career to the BBC.

== Personal life ==
At Bletchley Park he met (and on 17 November 1941 married) Joan Wingfield, who was working in the Italian Naval Section. They had seven children. He died on 26 November 2014, in Cheltenham. His younger brother was Frank Bonsall.

Government offices
Preceded by Sir Leonard Hooper	Director of GCHQ; December 1973 – November 1978	Succeeded by Sir Brian Tovey
