= Josh Cooper (cryptographer) =

English cryptographer (1901–1981)

Joshua Edward Synge ('Josh') Cooper CB, CMG (3 April 1901 in Fulham, London – 24 June 1981 in Buckinghamshire) was an English cryptographer.

Josh was the eldest son of Richard Edward Synge Cooper and his wife Mary Eleanor Burke who were married in Dublin exactly a year before his birth.

He was educated at Shrewsbury School, Brasenose College, Oxford, and King's College London.

He joined the Government Code and Cypher School as a Junior Assistant in October 1925 to specialise in Russian codes and ciphers. He was down from King's College London with a First in Russian and was teaching at a preparatory school in Margate. Then a sister of the novelist Charles Morgan said that Russian linguists were needed "at a place in Queen’s Gate". He was assigned to Ernst Fetterlein to work on Soviet diplomatic ciphers, with an Army officer, Capt. A.C. Stuart Smith. The first message he read was from Moscow to the Soviet representative in Washington, about the repudiation of debts by American states. In late 1929 to 1930 he was in the Naval Section attacking Russian Naval Codes, and was sent to Sarafand for a fifteen-month investigation of Black Sea Fleet communications. In 1936 he was made Head of the new Air Section at GC&CS.

At Bletchley Park in World War II he was head of the Air Section. He was awarded a C.M.G. in 1943 and a C.B. in 1958. Postwar Joshua wrote what some considered the best Russian grammar ever published.

His brother Arthur (born 1916) was also a linguist (Chinese and Japanese) at the FECB then FRUMEL; a bit eccentric but said to be a model of sanity compared with Joshua. Postwar Arthur translated Li Po and Tu Fu, a book of Chinese lyric poems, for the Penguin Classics series.
