= Gunslinger effect =

Psychophysical theory

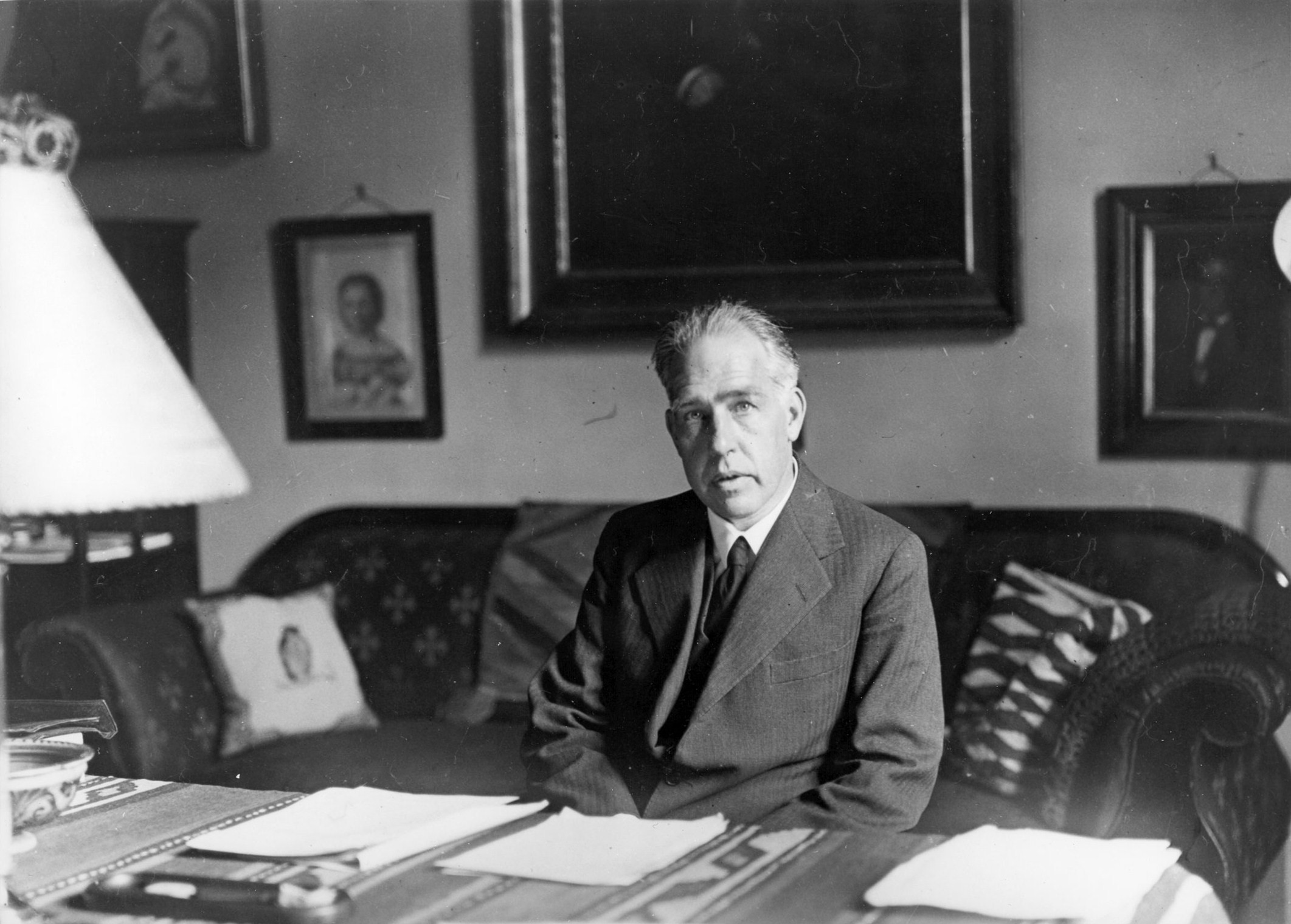
Physicist Niels Bohr is credited with creating the theory.

The gunslinger effect, also sometimes called Bohr's law or the gunfighter's dilemma, is a psychophysical theory which says that an intentional or willed movement is slower than an automatic or reaction movement. The concept is named after physicist Niels Bohr, who first deduced that the person who draws second in a gunfight will actually win the shoot-out.

== Bohr's experiment ==
Danish physicist Niels Henrik David Bohr came up with the hypothesis after watching Western films, which frequently depicted the protagonist drawing after his opponent in a gunfight and winning. He hypothesized that a person reacting might move faster than their opponent, who moved deliberately. Bohr and his students staged mock gunfights using toy guns to test this hypothesis, with apparently uncertain results. Bohr suggested that, to the extent the hypothesis is true, the logical alternative to a gunfight would be a peaceful settlement, since neither gunslinger would want to draw first knowing that they would lose.

== Experimental evidence ==
Later research confirmed the basic hypothesis, showing that intentional movements and reaction movements were controlled by two separate systems, and that it was not confined merely to hand or arm movements. The gunslinger effect applies to the initial reaction, not later limb control, but there is no trade-off between that early reaction and later targeting accuracy.

One study conducted at the University of Birmingham found that subjects moved 10% faster when reacting rather than acting with intention. However, the study also found that reactive movements were less accurate than intentional ones, and that the increased movement speed did not make up for the initial delay. Because of this, the authors of the study felt that the increased speed would not confer much advantage in a gunfight, although it may be advantageous in other situations.

Some later studies found that although volunteers' reactions were faster than deliberate actions during simple one-step tasks, this advantage was not present in more complex, multi-step actions. Furthermore, the effect was reversed when volunteers were presented with a choice of action, with reacting volunteers moving more slowly.

A 2020 study did find that Bohr's law held true during full-body actions, and was not confined to simple one-handed tasks.

== Applications ==
The comparison between reaction times and deliberate movement speed has applications for sports and dueling. A 2014 study conducted with two groups, karate practitioners and people without karate training, found that reactions were faster than intentional movements, regardless of training.

== See also ==
- Mexican standoff – Type of confrontation
