= GCHQ Bude =

Government Communications Headquarters installation in Bude, Cornwall, UK

GCHQ Bude, also known as GCHQ Composite Signals Organisation Station Morwenstow
- Part of Government Communications Headquarters
- Located near Coombe, Bude, Cornwall in United Kingdom
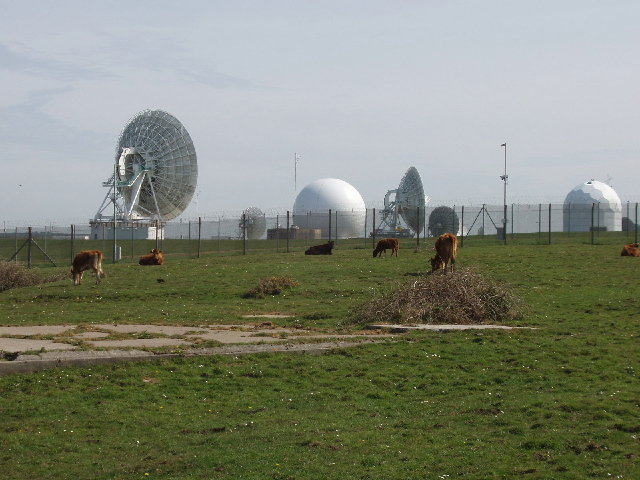
- Part of the satellite dish array of GCHQ Bude

Site information
- Type: UK Government satellite ground station and eavesdropping centre
- Owner: Government of the United Kingdom
- Operator: GCHQ
- Condition: Active
- Website: https://www.GCHQ.gov.uk/gchq-bude

Location
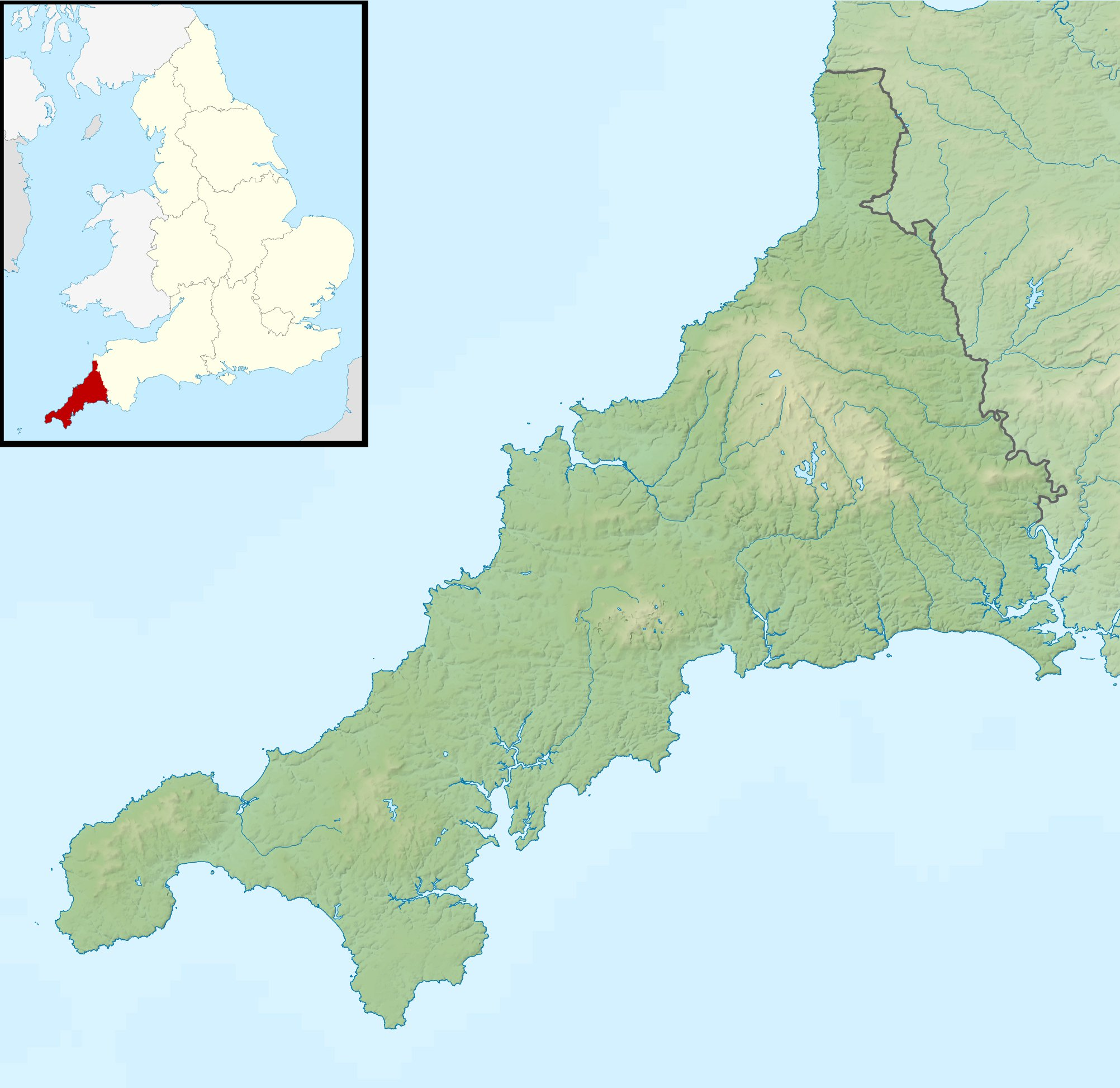
- Coordinates: 50°53′10″N 4°33′13″W
- Grid reference: SS 2046 1246

Site history
- Built: 1969–2001
- In use: 1974–present

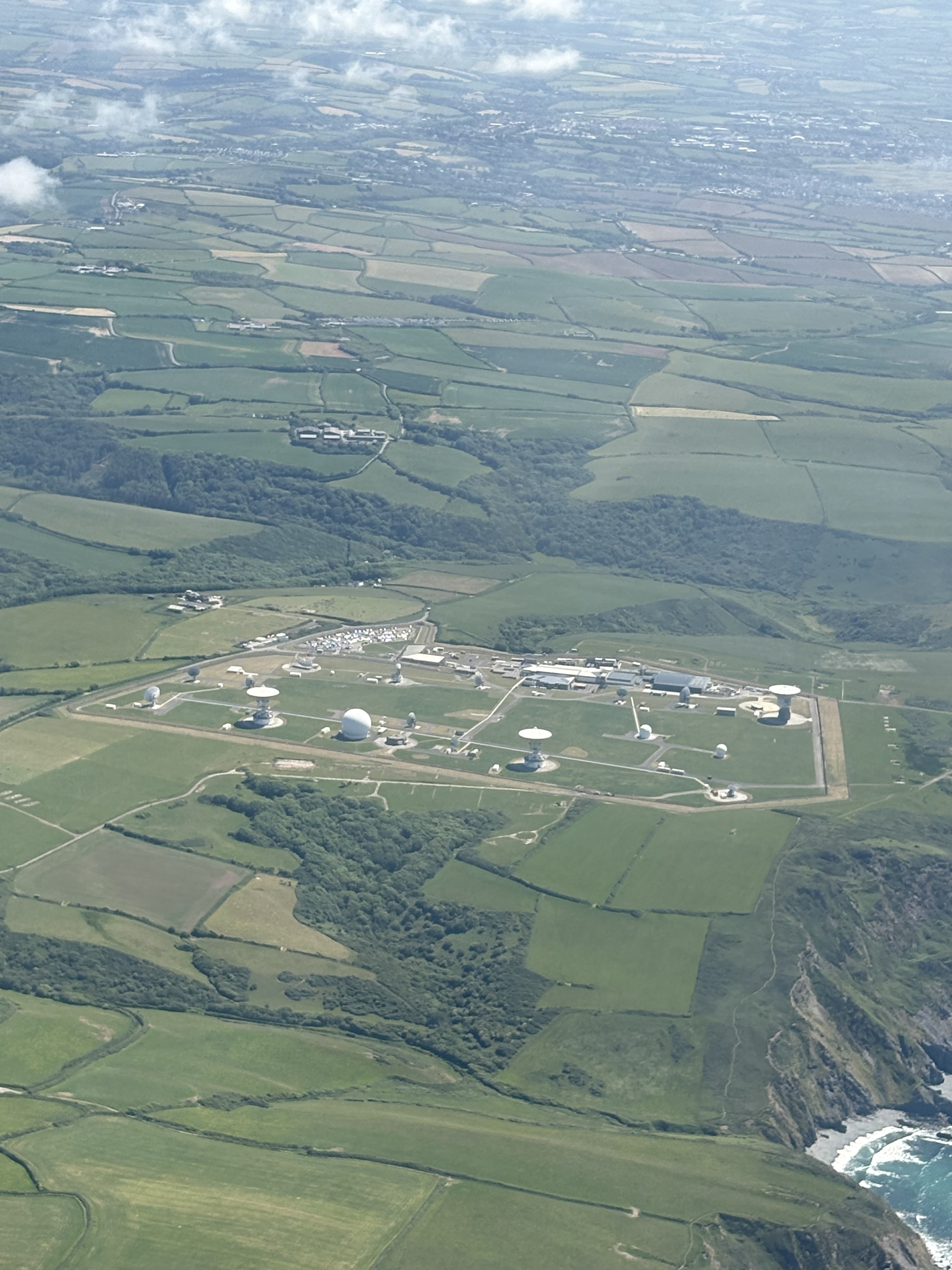
GCHQ Bude. The various satellite dishes are clearly visible

GCHQ Bude, also known as GCHQ Composite Signals Organisation Station Morwenstow, abbreviated to GCHQ CSO Morwenstow, is a UK Government satellite ground station and eavesdropping centre located on the north Cornwall coast at Cleave Camp, between the small villages of Morwenstow and Coombe. It is operated by the British signals intelligence service, officially known as the Government Communications Headquarters, commonly abbreviated GCHQ. It is located on part of the site of the former World War II airfield, RAF Cleave.

== History ==
The site of GCHQ Bude is in Morwenstow, the northernmost parish of Cornwall. During World War II, the location was developed for and used by the Royal Air Force (RAF). RAF Cleave was conceived as housing target and target support aircraft for firing ranges along the north Cornwall coast, and land was acquired from Cleave Manor. In 1939, it became home to two flights of 1 Anti-Aircraft Co-operation Unit (1AAC). In 1943, No. 639 Squadron was established on the site for the remainder of the war. The airfield was put under maintenance in April 1945, staying under government ownership.

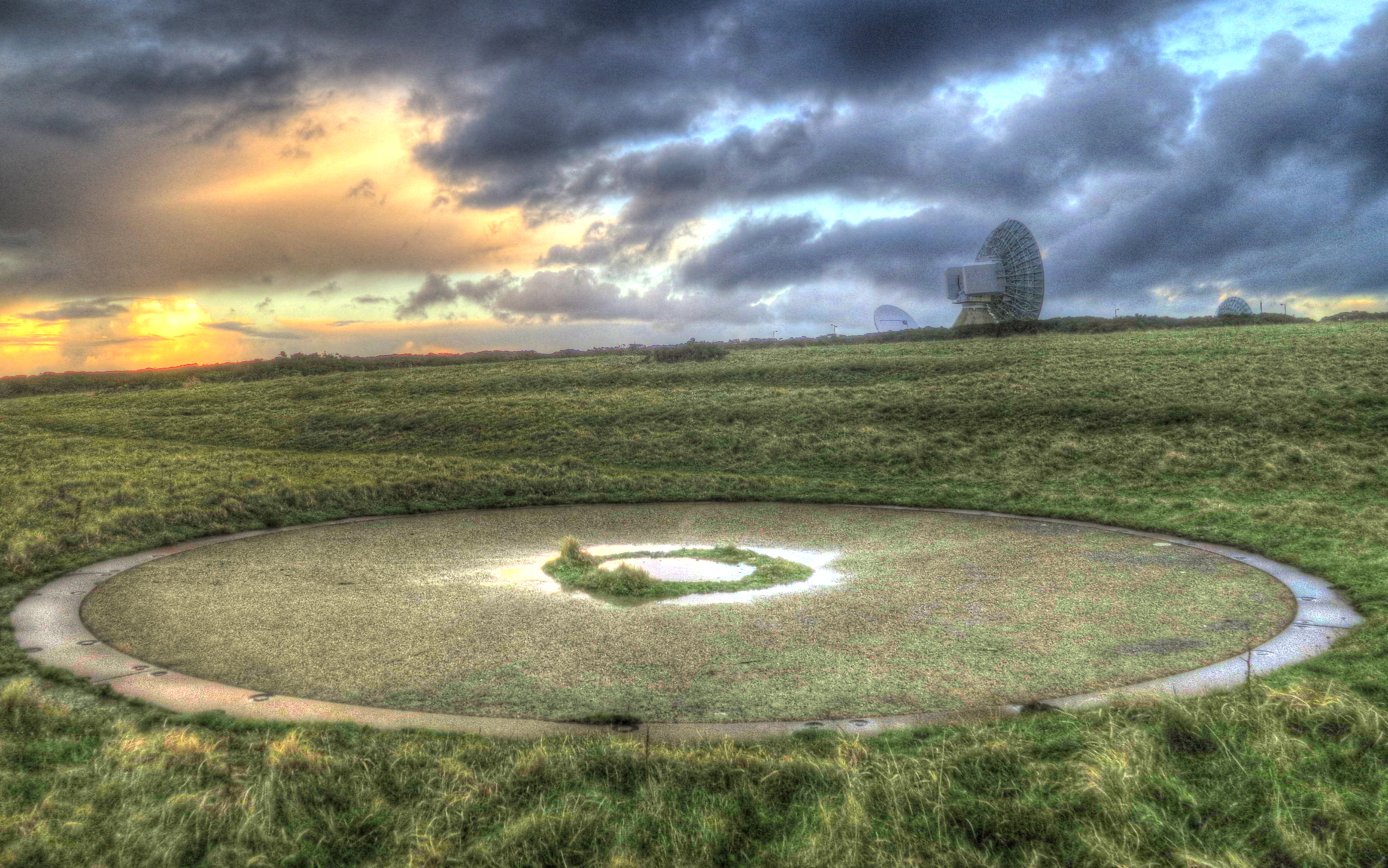
Remains of gun emplacement with GCHQ Bude dishes behind

=== Satellite interception ===
In the early 1960s, developments occurred which appear to have prompted the establishment of the facility now known as GCHQ Bude. In 1962, a satellite receiving station for the commercial communication satellites of Intelsat was established at Goonhilly Downs, just over 60 miles (100 kilometres) south-southwest of Morwenstow.

The downstream link from the Intelsat satellites could easily be intercepted by placing receiver dishes nearby in the satellites' 'footprint'. For that, the land at Cleave was allotted to the Ministry of Public Building and Works in 1967, and construction of the satellite interception station began in 1969. Two 27 m (90 ft) dishes appeared first, followed by smaller dishes in the ensuing years. The station was originally signposted as 'CSOS Morwenstow', with 'CSOS' standing for Composite Signals Organisation Station. In 2001, a third large dish appeared, and the station eventually became known as 'GCHQ Bude'.

=== UK-US cooperation ===
From its inception, the station has been an Anglo-American co-operative project. The United States National Security Agency (NSA) paid for most of the infrastructure and the technology. The running costs, like payments for the staff, were paid by GCHQ, who also provided the land. The intelligence that was collected by the Bude satellite station was shared between NSA and GCHQ, and was jointly processed.

Another sign of the close cooperation between both countries was that Sir Leonard Hooper, GCHQ director in the late 1960s, wrote to his NSA counterpart regarding the then two large dishes. He suggested naming them 'Pat' and 'Louis', after NSA director Marshall 'Pat' Carter and his deputy, Louis Tordella.

In 2010, the National Security Agency paid GCHQ £15.5m for redevelopments at the site.

=== Cable interception ===
In 1963, TAT-3, an undersea cable linking the United Kingdom to the United States, was laid from Tuckerton, New Jersey, US to Widemouth Bay, Cornwall, just 10 km (6 mi) south of the site at Cleave Camp. The British General Post Office (GPO) routinely monitored all communications passing along the TAT-3 cable, forwarding any messages they felt were relevant to the security services.

The site at Cleave Camp presented an opportunity to monitor submarine cable traffic from the nearby landing points, while at the same time intercepting communications meant for the commercial satellite ground station at Goonhilly Downs.

The Grace Hopper is a private undersea cable funded by Google that connects New York with Bude, with the location chosen as it was "an ideal, nicely protected beach and adjacent to a lot of the terrestrial infrastructure needed".

== Satellite installations ==
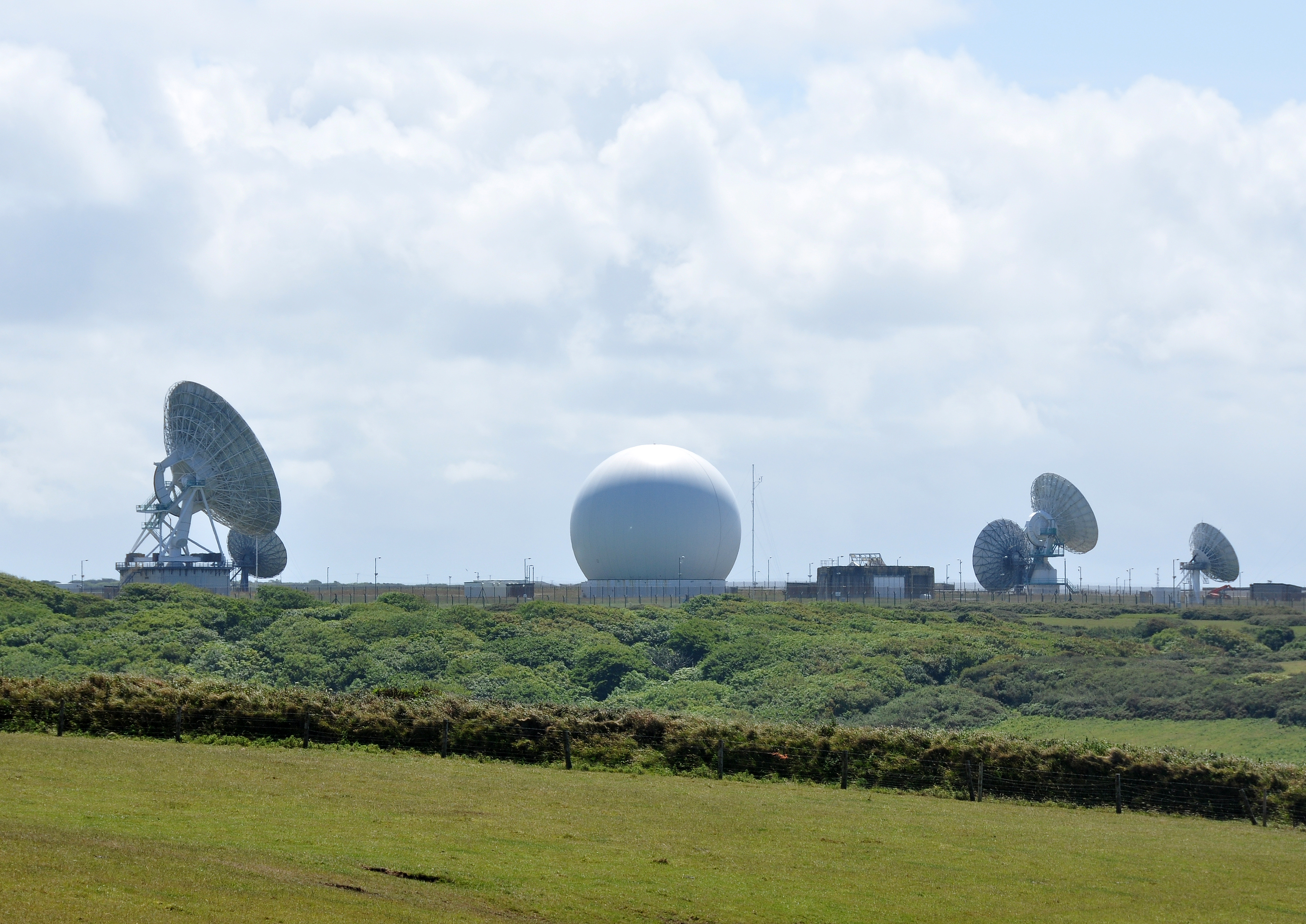
The different types satellite receivers at GCHQ Bude; including 'naked' parabolic antennas along with hidden antenna covered by a radome.

GCHQ Bude station comprises twenty one satellite antennas of various sizes, including three that have a diameter of 30 m (100 ft), that could theoretically cover all the main frequency bands: L band, C band, K_{u} band, X band, K_{a} band, and V band. Calculated on the basis of their position, their elevation, and their compass (azimuth) angle, the antennas are generally orientated towards satellites of the INTELSAT, Intersputnik, and INMARSAT communications networks over the Atlantic Ocean, Africa, and the Indian Ocean, as well as towards the Middle East and mainland Europe. Somewhere between 2011 and 2013, a torus antenna was installed, which is able to receive the signals of up to thirty-five satellites simultaneously. This antenna is not covered by a radome.

Staff are drawn from GCHQ (UK) and the NSA (US), and the station is operated under the UKUSA agreement, gathering data for the ECHELON signals intelligence (SIGINT) network. Comparable stations in operation include RAF Menwith Hill (UK), Sugar Grove Station (West Virginia, US), Yakima (Washington, US), Sabana Seca (Puerto Rico), Misawa Air Base (Japan), Pine Gap (Australia), Geraldton (Australia), GCSB Waihopai (New Zealand), and GCSB Tangimoana (New Zealand), that cover other INTELSAT areas such as South America and the Pacific Ocean.

== Activities ==
The activities of GCHQ Bude usually remain classified, partly in response to concerns expressed by some European Union (EU) member states that Morwenstow is responsible for industrial espionage and the interception of civilian communications; a report by the European Parliament (referenced below) was made public in 2001 that provides some details about the station. The Intelligence Services Act 1994 grants GCHQ the power 'to monitor or interfere with electromagnetic, acoustic and other emissions and any equipment producing such emissions, and to obtain and provide information derived from or related to such emissions or equipment'. This includes BlackBerry Messenger (BBM) and audio messages.

On 1 June 2007, GCHQ Bude was designated as a protected site for the purposes of Section 128 of the Serious Organised Crime and Police Act 2005. The effect of the act was to make it a specific criminal offence for a person to trespass into the site.

Up until early 2014, the GCHQ careers website had a page on GCHQ Bude, which said that it employs digital communications experts who play an important role in formulating the United Kingdom Government's response to issues involving national security, military operations and serious crime. The web page mentioned that the site is adjacent to the coastal footpath, which is part of the South West Coast Path. Elsewhere on the website, job applicants were warned that they will be subject to Developed Vetting Security Clearance, which could take up to nine months to proceed.

As of 2016, the GCHQ careers website had a 'Life at GCHQ' page, its 'Bude' section of the page describes working at GCHQ Bude a little. It mentions a gym and restaurant (boasting a "sea view") within the facility. It also describes a range of social and outdoor sporting events which employees can take part in.

== Media coverage ==
=== Edward Snowden and related revelations ===
In June 2013, The Guardian newspaper, using documents leaked by former National Security Agency (NSA) contractor, Edward Snowden, revealed the existence of an operation codenamed Tempora, whereby GCHQ is able to tap into data which flows along undersea cables and then store it for up to 30 days, to assess and analyse it. The article refers to a three-year trial set up at GCHQ Bude which, by mid-2011, was probing more than 200 internet connections.

A further Guardian report in December 2013 stated that eavesdropping efforts to target charities, German government buildings, the Israeli Prime Minister, and an EU commissioner centred on activities run from GCHQ Bude.

GCHQ Bude was featured extensively in the 3 September 2014 BBC Two Horizon television programme: 'Inside the Dark Web'. This programme estimated that 25% of all internet traffic travels through Cornwall. Dr Joss Wright of the University of Oxford Internet Institute explained how mirror images of the signals running down submarine Ethernet cables are used to gather and analyse data. The programme claimed that this procedure involves an optical tap device which is inserted at the submarine cable repeater station. A second copy of the data then travels to GCHQ, while the original carries on its intended journey. GCHQ, it was claimed, then have three days to replay the data. It was stated that everything that comes across the internet can theoretically be accessed; including emails, websites, BitTorrent downloads, films that have been watched, etc. Wright added that internal documents show that in 2011, 200 10-gigabit cables coming into Cornwall were being tapped by GCHQ. Wright said that the entire digitised contents of the British Library could be transferred down that set of cables in about 40 seconds. On the same programme, Tim Berners-Lee explained how huge volumes of data are analysed by GCHQ computer programmes to identify trends of communication which are deemed to require further examination.

On 20 November 2014, Channel 4 News broadcast an investigation prepared in collaboration with German broadcaster Westdeutscher Rundfunk (WDR). This report revealed that a leading UK communications company (Cable & Wireless, now Vodafone) cooperated with GCHQ to allow access to data, including that carried by a rival Indian telecommunications company. The broadcast detailed an operation centred on fibre-optic cables surfacing at Porthcurno beach and Sennen Cove in Cornwall, with data travelling to a nearby cable landing station at Skewjack Farm, and then onwards to GCHQ Bude.

=== Royal visit ===
On 4 April 2016, The Princess Royal made the first Royal visit to GCHQ Bude Station. She arrived by helicopter and was greeted by the head of GCHQ Bude Station, along with the Lord Lieutenant of Cornwall, Colonel Edward Bolitho. The visit consisted of a short tour of the site, and the princess met many members of staff, of all grades, from whom she learnt about some of the activities carried out at Bude.

=== Recruitment scheme ===
In July 2016, GCHQ launched its CyberFirst scheme for students in the 2016/17 academic year, offering bursaries for those studying relevant Science, Technology, Engineering and Mathematics (STEM) graduate courses, followed by guaranteed jobs at GCHQ, including at Bude GCHQ.

=== Pride GCHQ - rainbow illuminations ===
On 17 May 2016, the satellite dishes at GCHQ Bude Station were lit up in a display of rainbow colours. This was to mark the International Day Against Homophobia, Transphobia and Biphobia (IDAHOBiT). This display was a public act of unity and recognition of Pride GCHQ, and to assert the continued commitment by GCHQ to diversity and pride in its staff. It follows a similar rainbow coloured themed display in support of the 2015 IDAHOBiT at the GCHQ Cheltenham site a year earlier.

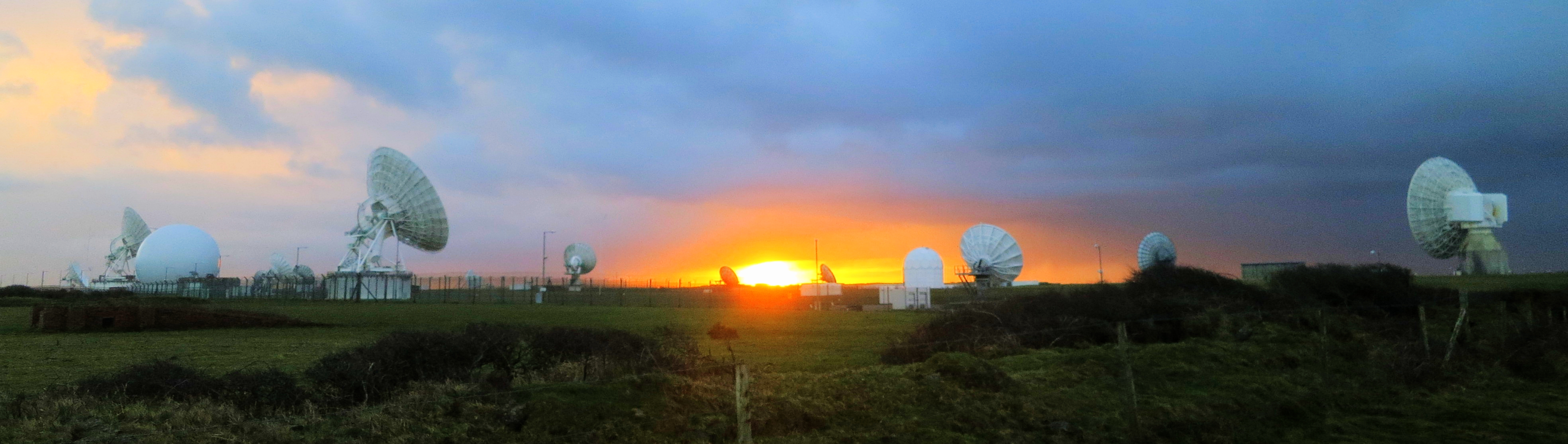
Facing east, sunrise at GCHQ Bude

== Related submarine cables ==
10 km (6 mi) south of GCHQ Bude, at Widemouth Bay, numerous submarine cables make landfall. They, followed by the locations to which they link in brackets, include: Apollo (US), TAT-3 (US), CANTAT-1 (Canada), TAT-8 (US and France - last used in 2002), TAT-14 (US and Europe), AC-2 (US), EIG (Europe and India), and GLO-1 (West Africa). Crooklets Beach at Bude, 5 km (3 mi) south of GCHQ Bude, is a key submarine cable landing point, in particular carrying financial trading data from New York.

== See also ==
- British intelligence agencies

Current stations

- GCHQ Ascension Island
- GCHQ Cyprus
- GCHQ Scarborough

Former stations

- GCHQ Brora
- GCHQ Cheadle
- GCHQ Culmhead
- GCHQ Hawklaw
- GCHQ Hong Kong

Related articles

- Hugh Alexander — head of GCHQ cryptanalysis division from 1949 to 1971
- RAF Digby
- RAF Intelligence
- Troodos Station
- UK Cyber Security Community
- Zircon — the cancelled GCHQ satellite project
- Operation Socialist
- Joint Operations Cell
- Mastering the Internet

== Bibliography ==
- Schmid, G. (11 July 2001). "Report on the existence of a global system for the interception of private and commercial communications (ECHELON interception system) (2001/2098(INI))". Session document A5-0264/2001. European Parliament.
