= Alison Robins =

British naval signals intelligence officer in World War II

- Birth name: Alison Gerrish
- Born: 9 March 1920; Branksome, Dorset, England
- Died: 15 October 2017 (aged 97)
- Allegiance: United Kingdom
- Service / branch: Royal Navy
- Wars: World War II

Alison Robins (nee Gerrish) (9 March 1920 – 15 October 2017) was a British naval signals intelligence officer. She joined the Women's Royal Naval Service (WRNS, "Wrens") in 1939 as an officers' steward and later joined the "Y-Service" in World War II.

== Early life ==
Robins (nee Gerrish) was born in Branksome, Dorset, on 9 March 1920. She was daughter of Edward Arthur Gerrish (28 April 1878 – 7 November 1960), a servant, who later married the daughter of the house, Alison Kellie-McCallum (29 September 1887 – 23 May 1975). She grew up attending eight different schools as her parents moved for her father to find work. Alison finished her school education in 1938 and qualified as a riding instructor, as a member of the Royal Horse Society.

== Bletchley Park ==
As one of the WRNS, Robins was one of the last surviving members of the 'Y-Service' at Bletchley Park, who listened-in to German communications. During the Second World War, Robins was said to have been bored as an officers' steward waiting at table in the Painted Hall of the Royal Naval College, Greenwich, so she joined a class to learn Morse code in her off-duty time. She quickly reached the speed needed to join the Signal School and in January 1941 passed the course and was made a Chief Petty Officer. Her first posting was to the R.N. Wireless Station at Scarborough. By May 1942 she was transferred to Felixstowe—a very busy station with E-Boats working continuously up and down the coast trying to destroy British convoys carrying vital supplies. All the Morse came in code that was passed to "Station X" to be decoded—a place so secret that few knew where or what it was. It was only in the late 1990s Alison discovered it was called Bletchley Park. In 1943, she moved to Sheringham in Norfolk where she decided to learn German so she could listen to speech as well as Morse from the U-boats. Various German speaking Wrens helped her learn by singing simple songs and she also bought a Hugo 'Teach Yourself German in 3 Months' book. Every day, German High Command gave out a report on the progress of the war and it was always at dictation speed so she learned to write it down accurately. She soon became proficient and was one of the few Wrens who could listen in both Morse and German. In 1943, she was transferred under the Commander-in-Chief, Dover—another very busy station with all the traffic passing through the English Channel and the build-up to the Allied invasion of Europe. She met her husband-to-be Maurice Robins while he was stationed near Dover with his regiment the 8th Middlesex. He went to France on D-Day+8 and fought through France, Belgium, Holland and Germany. As he had a degree in German, at the end of hostilities, he was seconded into Military Intelligence and used as an interpreter for the interrogation of German prisoners of war to decide who could safely be sent home and who should go on trial at Nuremberg.

In 2010, Alison Robins received the Bletchley Park badge from the Prime Minister, David Cameron, with the citation 'The Government wishes to express to you its deepest gratitude for the vital service you performed in World War II'.

== Personal life ==
Alison and her husband John Maurice Usher Robins (5 January 1918 – 21 October 1987), had four children together: Beatrice Anne, Elizabeth Jill, Rosemary Gay, and Marguerite Suzanne (5 July 1953 – 10 July 1953) who died five days after childbirth. By her death, she had seven grandchildren and eight great-grandchildren.
