= RAF Cleave =

Former RAF base in Cornwall, England

RAF Cleave
- Near Kilkhampton, Cornwall in England
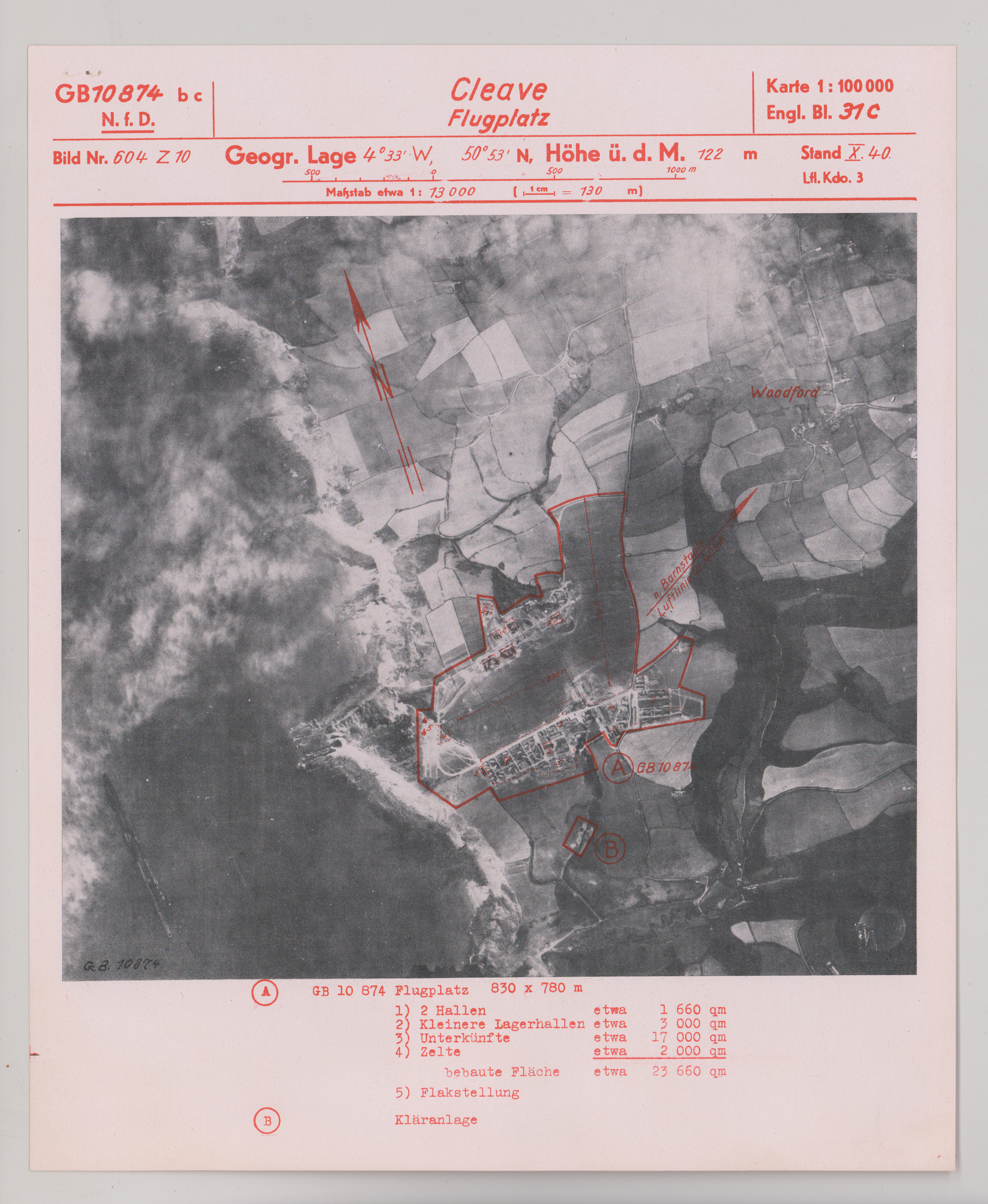
- RAF Cleave on a target dossier of the German Luftwaffe, 1940

Site information
- Type: Royal Air Force station
- Owner: Air Ministry
- Operator: Royal Air Force
- Controlled by: RAF Fighter Command * No. 10 Group RAF

Location
- Shown within Cornwall RAF Cleave (the United Kingdom)
- Coordinates: 50°53′08″N 04°33′00″W

Site history
- Built: 1938/39
- In use: May 1939 – November 1945
- Battles/wars: European theatre of World War II

Airfield information
- Elevation: 122 metres (400 ft) AMSL
Runways
Direction	Length and surface
06/24	656 metres (2,152 ft) Grass
18/36	823 metres (2,700 ft) Grass

Royal Air Force Cleave or more simply RAF Cleave is a former Royal Air Force station located 4.2 miles (7 kilometres) north of Bude in Cornwall, England, which was operational from 1939 until 1945. Despite a few periods of intense activity, it was one of RAF Fighter Command's lesser used airfields.

== History ==
RAF Cleave was conceived as a housing target and target support aircraft for firing ranges along the north Cornwall coast, and land was acquired from Cleave Manor.

In May 1939, two flights of No. 1 Anti-Aircraft Co-operation Unit RAF (1 AACU) with the Westland Wallace, and a naval steam catapult were soon erected near the cliffs for the pilotless Queen Bee aircraft due to be stationed there. Aircraft were initially housed in temporary Bessonneau hangars (type H of World War I vintage), and later replaced by more permanent structures.

In December 1943, the four flights were amalgamated into 639 Squadron, which served at Cleave for the remainder of the war.

The airfield was placed under care and maintenance in April 1945, and later became a government signals station.

== Posted squadrons ==
unit	dates stationed	aircraft used	duties
1 AACU (A, D, G, K, O & V Flights)	– 31 October 1942	Hawker Henley, Westland Wallace	target towing
1602 (AAC) Flt	1 November 1942 – 1 December 1943	Hawker Henley	formed from D Flight 1AACU, target towing
1603 (AAC) Flt	1 November 1942 – 1 December 1943	Hawker Henley, Fairey Battle	formed from G Flight 1AACU, target towing
1604 (AAC) Flt	1 November 1942 – 1 December 1943	Hawker Henley, de Havilland Tiger Moth	formed from O Flight 1AACU, target towing
1618 (AAC) Flt	1 November 1942 – 1 December 1943	de Havilland Tiger Moth, de Havilland Queen Bee	target towing & pilotless targets
639 Sqn	1 December 1943 – 30 April 1945	Hawker Henley, Hawker Hurricane	formed from 1602, 1603, & 1604 Flts

== Current use ==
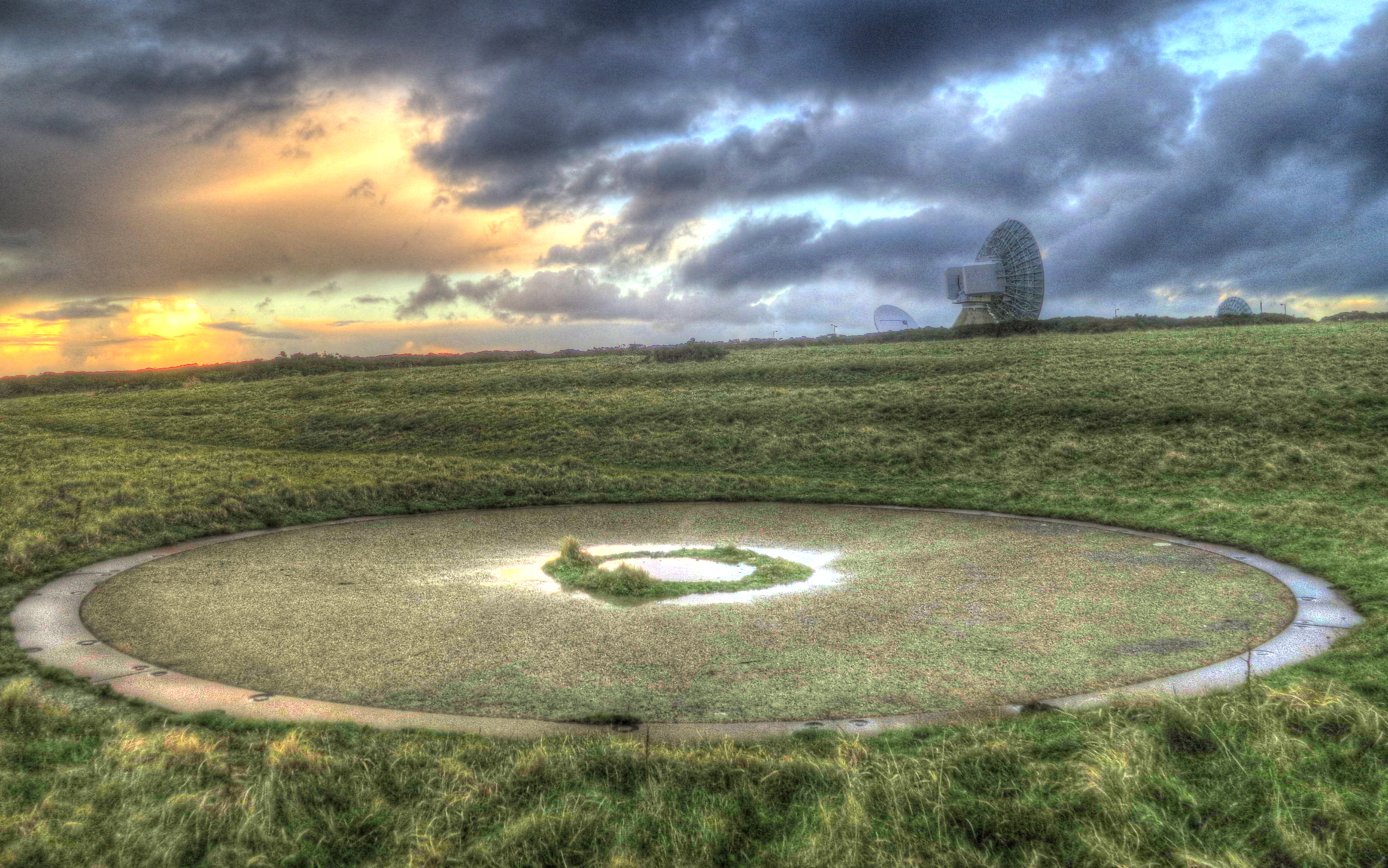
Remains of an RAF Cleave gun emplacement, with the modern satellite dishes of GCHQ Bude behind

Apart from an undisturbed piece of the grass runway to the north, a very short section of concrete perimeter track, and a few of the married quarters accommodation on Cleave Crescent, the site has been almost completely re-modelled as GCHQ Bude.

== See also ==
- List of former Royal Air Force stations
