= GCHQ Scarborough =

British signals intelligence station

- Part of Government Communications Headquarters
- Located near Scarborough, North Yorkshire, United Kingdom
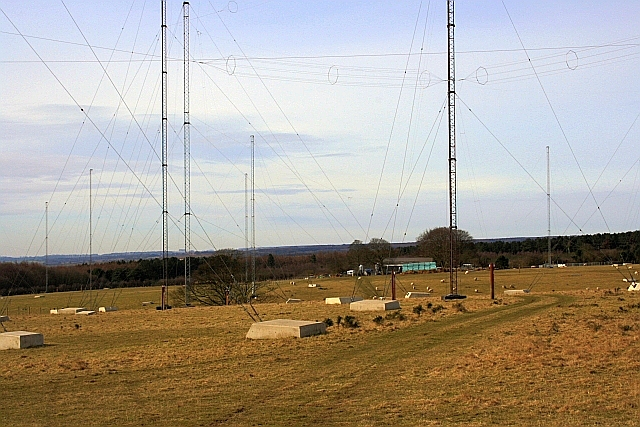
- Aerials, Irton Moor Part of the wireless station known as 'GCHQ Scarborough'

Site information
- Type: Satellite Ground Station

Location
- Location in North Yorkshire
- Coordinates: 54°16′01″N 0°26′50″W

Site history
- Built: 1943

GCHQ Scarborough is a satellite ground station located on Irton Moor, on the outskirts of Scarborough in North Yorkshire, England, operated by the British signals intelligence service (GCHQ). It is believed to be the longest continuous serving site for signals intelligence in the world.

== History ==
The Royal Navy first established a Wireless Telegraphy Station in Scarborough in 1912. Since 1914, it has conducted signals intelligence (Sigint). During the First World War, the station's purpose was to monitor the German High Seas Fleet which was making attacks on the East Coast of England. Following the cessation of hostilities in 1918, the role of the station was widened to include diplomatic communications, with resources eventually being split between the diplomatic and the naval aspects. In 1932, a proposal was made to close the Scarborough station and transfer its duties to RAF Flowerdown in Hampshire, but eventually this proposal was turned down and the station resumed operations in 1935.

At the outbreak of the Second World War, the Scarborough station was classified as a Y-station. It intercepted German naval and naval air communications, and also controlled a direction finding network. The station's complement became a mix of civilian members of the Admiralty Civilian Shore Wireless Service (ACSWS) and service personnel, to be augmented by members of the Women's Royal Naval Service later in the war. In May 1941, the station played a central role in the location and sinking of the Bismarck, for which they were later thanked by then-Prime Minister Winston Churchill.

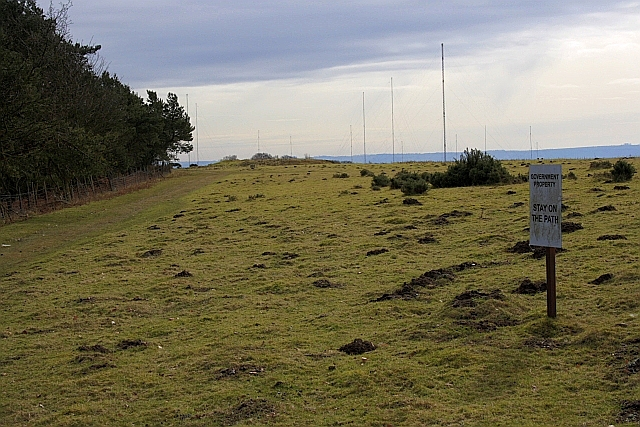
A footpath on the outskirts of the station.

The station moved to its present location in 1943, which at the time was a "half-buried bomb-proof bunker". Following the end of the Second World War and the beginning of the Cold War, the station became the main station for the interception of Soviet naval communications. The station intercepted communications from Soviet ships at the height of the Cuban Missile Crisis; the reports were sent directly to the White House. In 1965, ACSWS was transferred to the control of the Government Communications Headquarters (GCHQ), and became part of a network known as the Composite Signals Organisation (CSO). The station became known as CSOS Irton Moor.

Work on a new building began in 1972 and all operations had been transferred from the "bunker" to the new building by 1974. Following the fall of the Iron Curtain in the early 1990s, the role of Sigint in the UK became less important, and the functions of both GCHQ Cheadle and GCHQ Culmhead were transferred to Scarborough in 1995 and 1998, respectively. In July 2001, the site name changed to GCHQ Scarborough.

On 1 June 2007 GCHQ Scarborough was designated as a protected site for the purposes of Section 128 of the Serious Organised Crime and Police Act 2005. The effect of the act was to make it a specific criminal offence for a person to trespass into the site.

In 2014, the station celebrated its centenary, and was visited by Charles, Prince of Wales. The site is considered the longest continuously-running Sigint station in the world.

It was announced in July 2016, that the base was to be allocated £42 million of funding in order to become the 'training and skills hub for the north of England'. The four-year package will see £30 million spent on infrastructure, and £12 million on training skills (most specifically, a recruitment drive).

== Role ==
Through the exploitation of SIGINT, GCHQ Scarborough's remit is to gain intelligence from global communications, to protect deployed forces around the world, and to assist law enforcement agencies in preventing organised crime (human trafficking, child sexual exploitation and drug smuggling) and terror-related activity. In 2018, more than 200 people worked at the site, with a full fall-back contingency in case the main GCHQ site at Cheltenham should be off line for any reason. With the new ATTIC building (Alan Turing Training and Innovation Centre), which coordinates training for the northern GCHQ network, staffing should rise to 300 at the site before 2020.

== See also ==
- British intelligence agencies
- GCHQ Bude
