= Fairey P.4/34 =

British light bomber prototype

P.4/34

General information
- Type: Light Bomber
- National origin: United Kingdom
- Manufacturer: Fairey Aviation
- Designer: Marcel Lobelle
- Number built: 2

History
- First flight: 13 January 1937
- Developed into: Fairey Fulmar

The Fairey P.4/34 was a competitor for an order for a light bomber to serve with the Royal Air Force. Although not produced in that form, it formed the basis for the Fulmar long-range carrier-based fighter for the Fleet Air Arm.

== Development ==
In 1934 the Air Ministry issued Specification P.4/34 which called for a light bomber that could also be used in a close-support role. Fairey, Gloster and Hawker tendered proposals; contracts were issued for the construction of examples of the Hawker and Fairey designs. The P.4/34 was a low-wing all-metal monoplane, powered by a Rolls-Royce Merlin engine, with a crew of two accommodated in tandem under a long-glazed canopy. Its layout was similar to the earlier Fairey Battle bomber but the P.4/34 was smaller and had a wide track, inwards-retracting undercarriage. The aircraft was stressed for dive bombing, as required by the specification and carried its load of two 250 lb (110 kg) bombs underwing (the competing Hawker aircraft had an internal bomb bay).

Two Fairey P.4/34s were ordered, with the first (serial K5099) flying on 13 January 1937. The prototype Hawker Henley followed on 10 March 1937. The Hawker was deemed superior but the demand for a light bomber had changed and it entered service as a target tug. The Royal Danish Navy purchased a licence to build the P.4/34 and a production line set up at the Danish Naval Shipyard (Orlogsværftet) in Copenhagen. None of the twelve aircraft ordered was completed by the time of the Operation Weserübung the German Invasion of Denmark in 1940.

The P.4/34 would serve as the basis for a two-seat, long-range, carrier-based fighter for the Fleet Air Arm to meet the requirements of Specification O.8/38. The second prototype P.4/34 (serial K7555) was modified with, among other things, a reduced-span wing and lowered tailplane as an aerodynamic prototype for the Fulmar. It was later used to test retractable Fairey-Youngman flaps to be used on the Fairey Firefly fighter.

Meanwhile, by 1938, the first prototype P4 had transferred to RAE Farnborough, where it was used for testing the effects of barrage balloons – by deliberately flying into a weighted cable hung beneath (not the actual tether cable). Initially the tests were carried out over RAF Lakenheath, transferring in September 1939 to RAF Pawlett Hams. A Battle 'chase plane' from RAF Mildenhall was provided to film the results. Later the P4 was joined by another Battle: although both were reinforced to withstand the impacts severe damage to the airframe was usual. Most of the flights were made by Johnny Kent (the original pilot chosen, A. E. Clouston, had taken leave to pursue the London – New Zealand speed record) – who accumulated more than 300 collisions and was awarded The Air Force Cross for his efforts. Of the P4 Kent said "a delightful aeroplane through all manoeuvres except for the spin which was really vicious..."

== Specifications (P.4/34) ==
Data from The British Bomber since 1914, Fairey Aircraft since 1915

General characteristics

- Crew: 2
- Length: 40 ft 0 in (12.19 m)
- Wingspan: 47 ft 4.5 in (14.440 m)
- Height: 14 ft 1 in (4.29 m)
- Airfoil: root: NACA 2418; tip: NACA 2409
- Empty weight: 6,405 lb (2,905 kg)
- Gross weight: 8,787 lb (3,986 kg)
- Powerplant: 1 × Rolls-Royce Merlin II or Merlin I V-12 liquid-cooled piston engine, 1,030 hp (770 kW)
- Propellers: 3-bladed variable-pitch propeller

Performance

- Maximum speed: 283 mph (455 km/h, 246 kn) at 15,000 ft (4,600 m)
- Stall speed: 55 mph (89 km/h, 48 kn)
- Range: 1,000 mi (1,600 km, 870 nmi)
- Service ceiling: 26,600 ft (8,100 m)

Armament

- Guns: 1 × fixed, forward-firing .303 in machine gun
- Bombs: 2 × 250 lb (113 kg) bombs externally

== See also ==
Related development

- Fairey Battle
- Fairey Fulmar

Aircraft of comparable role, configuration, and era

- Hawker Henley
