= Admiralty Civilian Shore Wireless Service =

Radio service and wireless network of British Royal Navy

Admiralty Civilian Shore Wireless Service (ACSWS)

Department overview
- Formed: 1912 formal 1939
- Dissolved: 1965
- Superseding Department: GCHQ
- Jurisdiction: Government of the United Kingdom
- Headquarters: Irton Moor, Scarborough, North Yorkshire, England, England
- Parent Department: Admiralty

The Admiralty Civilian Shore Wireless Service (ACSWS) was a radio service and network of wireless stations operated by the British Royal Navy based at Irton Moor, Scarborough, North Yorkshire, England from 1939 to 1956.

== History ==
In 1912, the Royal Navy built a Wireless Telegraphy Station at Scarborough, England. At the outbreak of World War I in 1914 the main responsibility of the Scarborough station was to provide military signals intelligence for the Admiralty, monitoring German naval communications. After World War I, the station's primary mission shifted to monitoring diplomatic communications.

In 1932, a proposal was made by the Admiralty to close the Scarborough site and to transfer operations to Flowerdown, Hampshire; however this decision was never implemented and in 1935 and the interception of German Navy signals by the Admiralty was restarted. In August 1939 the Scarborough station was designated as part of Y Service, a network of British intelligence collection sites responsible for intercepting enemy and neutral radio transmissions, and was put on a war footing. As part of Y Service, Scarborough intercepted German Naval and Naval Air communications and controlled a Direction-Finding network throughout World War II. During May 1941, the station at Scarborough played a key role in the location and subsequent destruction of the German battleship Bismarck.

At the start of World War II, the civilians working in signals intelligence for the Admiralty at Scarborough became officially known as the Admiralty Civilian Shore Wireless Service (ACSWS). Throughout the war the civilian complement at the Scarborough station was augmented by Naval Service personnel, including members of the Women's Royal Naval Service.

Post World War II the Admiralty Civilian Shore Wireless Service and the station at Scarborough's role was to monitor and collect communications of the Soviet Armed Forces. In 1965 the Admiralty Civilian Shore Wireless Service's role and functions were amalgamated into the Government Communications Headquarters (GCHQ), where it became part of the Composite Signals Organisation. The wireless station at Scarborough became CSOS Irton Moor and is now known as GCHQ Scarborough.

== See also ==
- GCHQ

== Sources ==
- Archives, The National. "TELECOMMUNICATIONS AND RADIO (93): Admiralty Civilian Shore Wireless Service: formation". discovery.nationalarchives.gov.uk. National Archives UK, ADM 1/10004, 1938-1939.
- A short history of Sigint in Scarborough | GCHQ Site". www.gchq.gov.uk. Government Communications Headquarters, UK, 2018.
