= Bessonneau hangar =

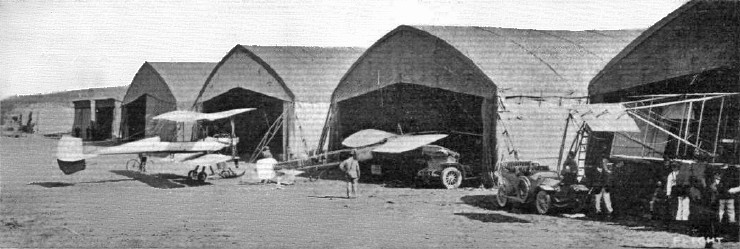
Bessonneau hangars at Vesoul, 1911

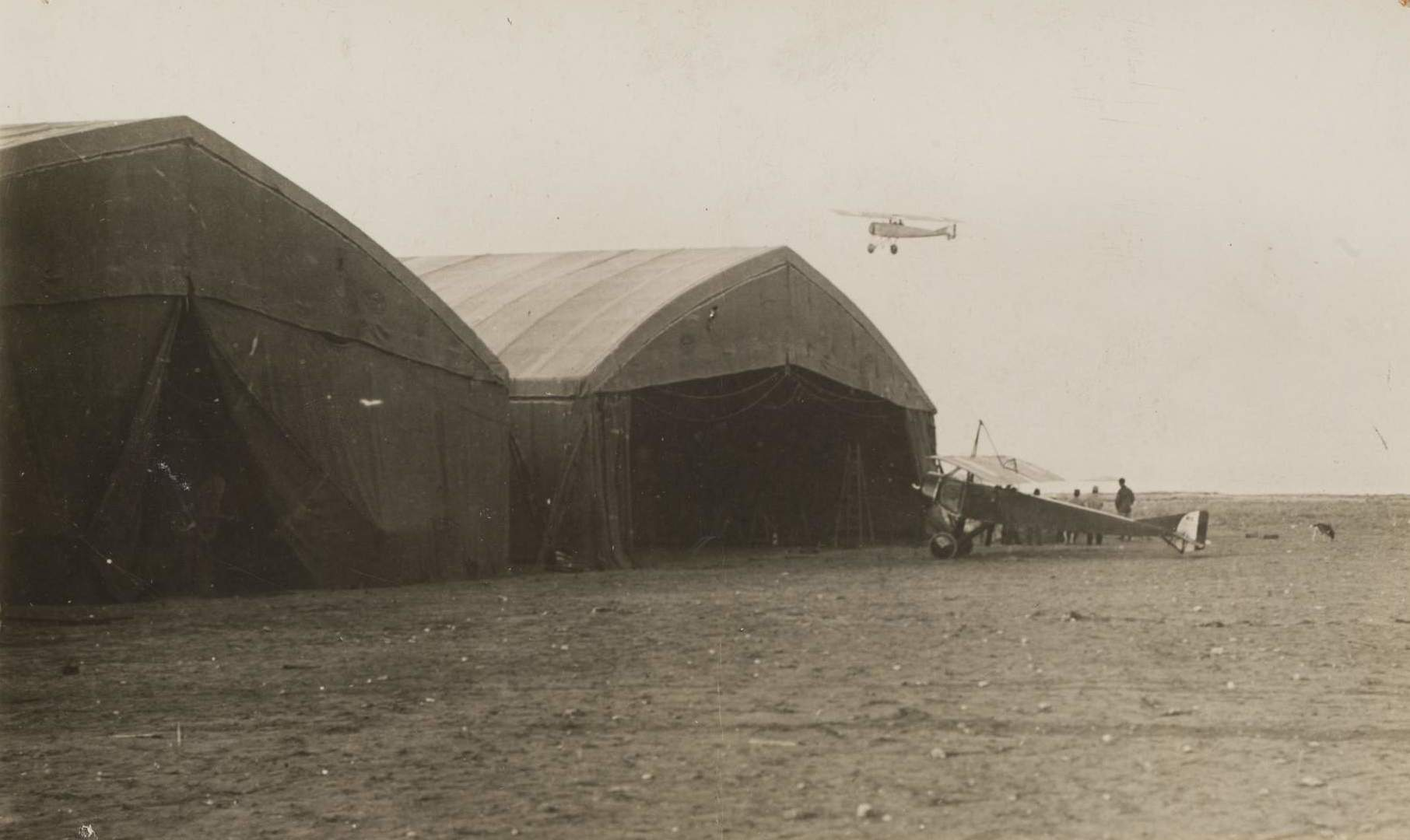
French Morane-Saulnier L aircraft with Bessonneau hangars, probably in 1914 or 1915

The Bessonneau hangar was a portable timber and canvas aircraft hangar used by the French Aéronautique Militaire and subsequently adopted by the Royal Naval Air Service (RNAS) and the Royal Flying Corps (RFC) during the First World War. Many Bessonneau hangars were also subsequently used by the fledgling Royal Air Force (RAF) as temporary structures until more permanent facilities could be built such as at RAF Cleave in Cornwall.

== History ==
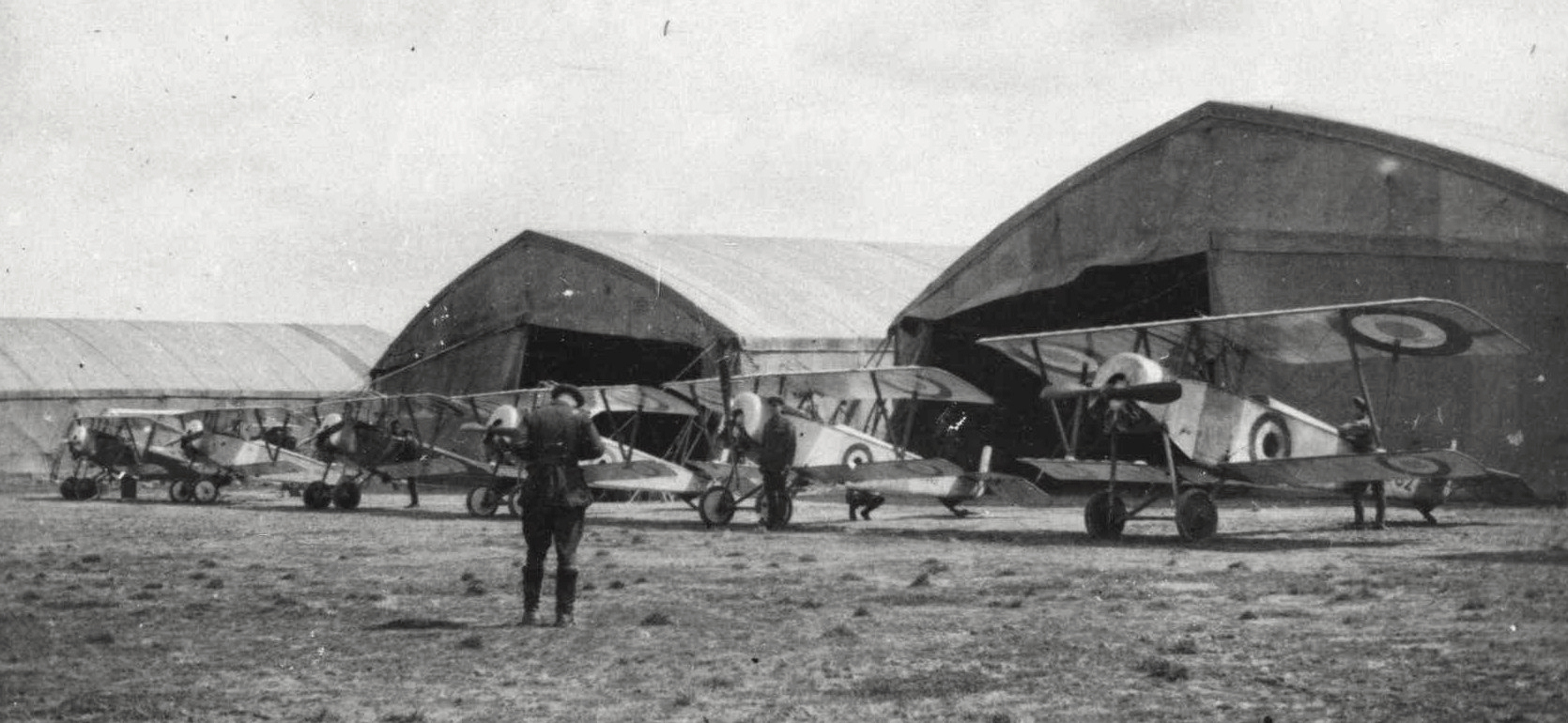
Bessonneau Hangars behind a lineup of RNAS Nieuports

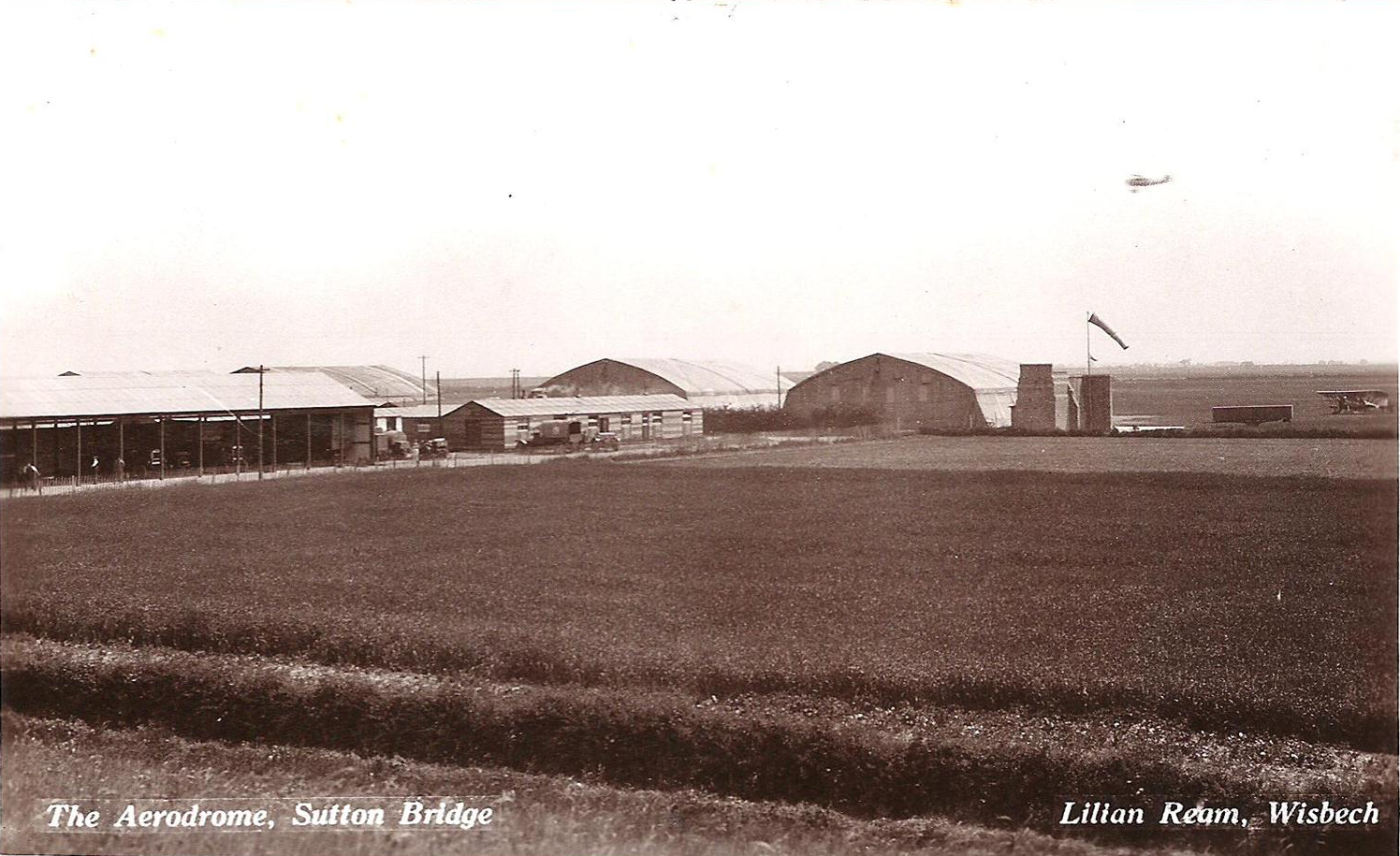
Four Bessonneau hangars on the newly formed aerodrome of R.A.F. Practice Camp Sutton Bridge in England during the late 1920s.

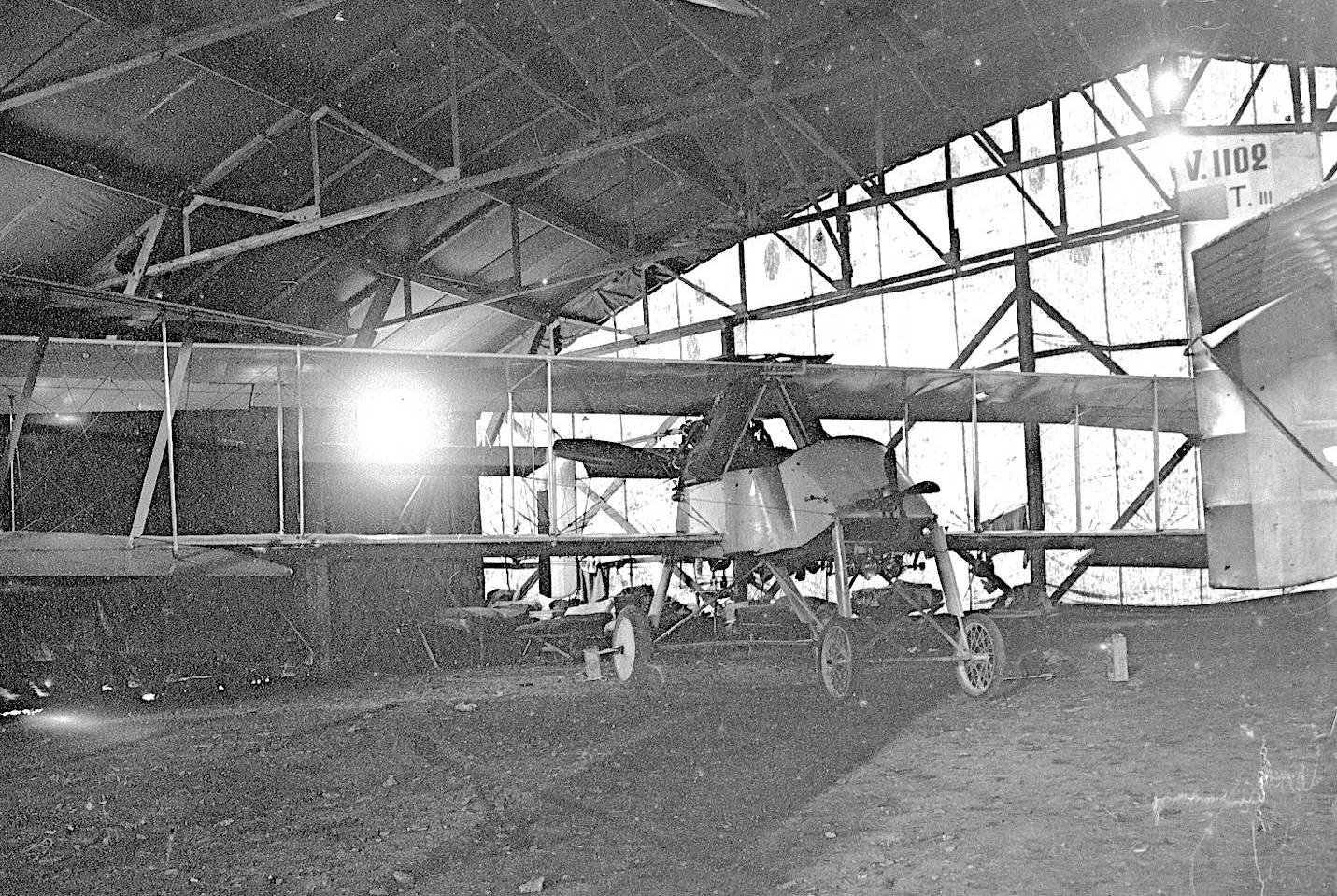
French Voisin V inside Bessonneau hangar

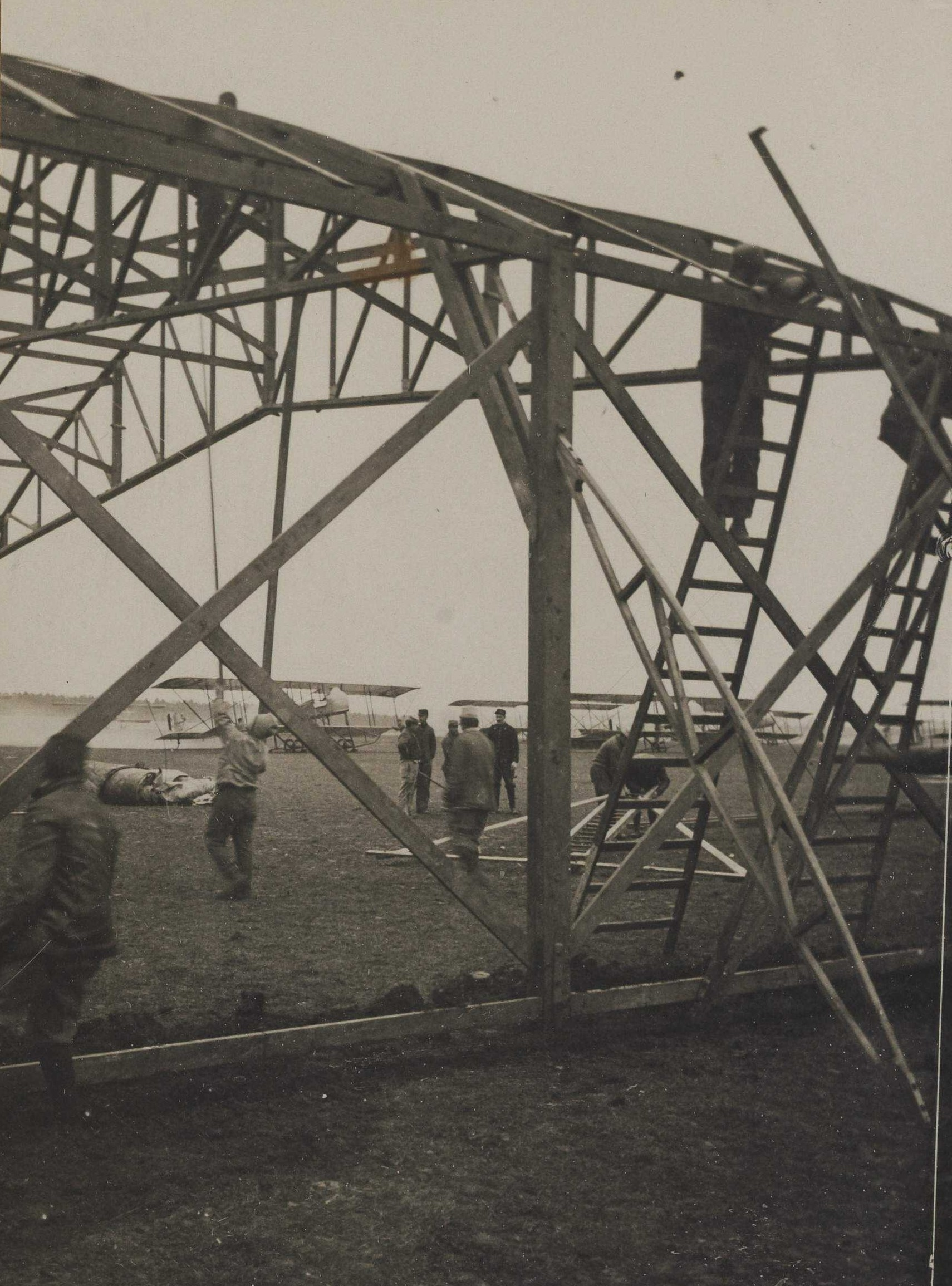
Bessonneau hangar being assembled in 1915 at a French airfield

Around 1908, the Bessonneau hangar was designed and manufactured by the French rope and canvas manufacturer Établissements Bessonneau, headed by Julien Bessonneau, and based at Angers. The hangar, then referred to as a Bessonneau tent, was first used in the area of Maine-et-Loire, and in 1910, specifically employed to protect aircraft participating in an air race from Angers to Saumur. By the start of the First World War, they were widely used by the Aéronautique Militaire, and as a consequence were adopted by the expeditionary forces of both the RNAS and the RFC to house aircraft in both Great Britain and France. Bessonneau hangars were used for temporary protection for aircraft pending construction and development of permanent hangars.

After World War I, Bessonneau hangars were often used for cheap storage for civilian aircraft, and the newly formed Royal Air Force continued to employ these hangars into World War II, designating them 'Aircraft Hangar (Type H)', and defined by Air Publication AP.4488A. After World War II, British military use of Bessonneau hangars continued for the purpose of storing powered aircraft and gliders operated by the Air Training Corps ('Air Cadets'), until about 1990, and the last spare parts were disposed of by RAF Stafford. A few Bessonneau hangars then briefly survived with gliding clubs for military personnel at airfields such as Kenley, but they typically succumbed to bad weather – as happened to one of the last survivors at RAF Odiham circa 2010 – and inadequate maintenance. Two intact Bessonneau hangars are known to survive as of 2020, one near High River, in Alberta, Canada clad in plywood instead of canvas and another owned by the Fondazione Jonathan Collection in Italy. A third hangar was disassembled and stored by Aéroscope Atlantique in 2004.

== Construction ==
The hangar was supplied as a kit of parts that could be easily erected, dismantled, transported and re-erected at another location. The principal material of the framework was wood, joined by wooden plates, steel brackets, and steel bolts. Vertical stanchions supported roof trusses, with extensively triangulated ties and beams. Bays (units) of stanchions and trusses were built up and connected to each other, with each hangar assembled with six, nine, or twelve bays to achieve different hangar lengths. Wooden flying buttresses were applied to the sides and rear, to ensure rigidity, and ropes were used to tie down the whole structure onto steel pickets driven into the ground. Snow poles were attached to the underside of selected trusses, and hinged to allow them to be lowered for extra roof support in the event of heavy snow or high winds. The tailored canvas covering was tied to the framework with ropes.

Over 1000 covers were made for the hangars at Messrs Paull & Co in Martock, Somerset.

The most common variant in Britain was the six-bay design, providing an inside space 20 m (65.6 ft) wide, 24 m (78.7 ft) deep and 4 m (13.1 ft) tall. Its outside dimensions were 22 m (72.2 ft) across, 28 m (91.9 ft) deep and 7.7 m (25.3 ft) tall, excluding picketing ropes.
