= Skewjack =

Plot of land in Cornwall used for telecommunications

Coordinates: 50.065°N 5.682°W

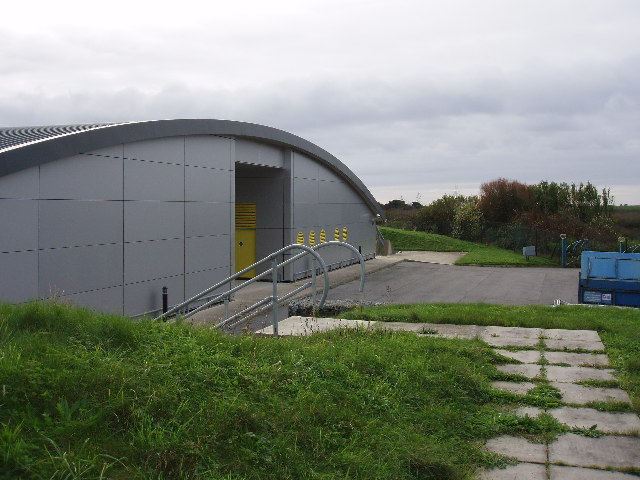
Modern Fibre-optic Link Around the Globe building

Skewjack is a plot of land in west Cornwall, England, United Kingdom. It is situated about 1.5 miles (2 km) east of Land's End on the B3315 road. It was the site of RAF Sennen, and is now the site of a Fibre-optic Link Around the Globe building.

== RAF Sennen ==
Skewjack became well known in the Second World War when a Royal Air Force station known as RAF Sennen was set up in 1942 between Skewjack Farm and nearby Trebehor Farm, about half-a-mile (1 km) to the south east.

The RAF radar site was actually about 1 mile (1.5 km) from Sennen Churchtown village or about 2 miles (3 km) from Sennen Cove and at a good location for radio line-of-sight (LOS) towards the Atlantic Ocean. Several masts were erected, some over 300 feet (100 m) high, in nearby fields to support radar antennas as part of an early warning radar station. Code-named "Chain Home Low", the equipment was very advanced for the early days of radar, being able to detect ships and approaching low flying aircraft up to about 20 miles (30 km) into the Western Approaches off Land's End.

RAF Sennen's living quarters were near Skewjack Farm, comprising a small 'village' of huts and a few dozen resident RAF personnel. Some of the operational equipment was installed in buried and camouflaged bunkers closer to Trebehor Farm. The site later operated GEE (navigation) equipment. Sennen is listed as a location for an Oboe (navigation) site, and the RAF site can be assumed to be where it was sited.

The site remained an RAF site until the 1970s.

== Telecommunications use ==
In 1978 one of the former RAF buildings on the east side of the site was refurbished to accommodate the relocated Land's End Radio maritime coastal radio station from St Just, about 5 miles (8 km) to the north, on account of the site being less susceptible to radio interference. The site was then owned by Post Office Telecommunications, a predecessor of British Telecom. Land's End Radio gradually became redundant, the maritime traffic having been transferred to mobile telephone networks and satellite, and it closed in June 2000..

The site is now the British cable terminal for the Fibre-optic Link Around the Globe (FLAG). A new submarine cable terminating station building was constructed by E. Thomas (Mowlem) Ltd. on behalf of the new site owner, the telecommunications operator FLAG Atlantic, on the surf village site. The building received the CPRE/RIBA Cornwall Architecture Award in 2002.

In 2014 it was revealed that Skewjack Farm was the location of the Government Communications Headquarters interception point on the Indian telecoms company Reliance Communications international fibre link, copying data to GCHQ Bude as part of GCHQ's Mastering the Internet project.

== Surf village ==
Also in the 1970s, part of the west side of the site was converted to self-catering accommodation for sea-surfing enthusiasts, known as the Skewjack Surf Village. The camp was the brainchild of Chris Tyler (deceased 2016) and was the forerunner of surfing camps and surf schools in the UK, Europe and the world. Guests stayed in the converted RAF buildings and were transported to the local beaches at Sennen and Porthcurno in a converted ambulance known as Amy. As surfing evolved and demand changed so did the camp and it 'kept going' until the surf village closed in 1986 and was demolished in 2000.
