= John A. Kent =

Canadian pilot

- "Johnny" Kent posing in front of a Hurricane, October 1940
- Born: John Alexander Kent; 23 June 1914; Winnipeg, Manitoba, Canada
- Died: 7 October 1985 (aged 71); Woking, Surrey, England
- Military career
- Allegiance: United Kingdom
- Branch: Royal Air Force
- Service years: 1935–1956
- Rank: Group Captain
- Nicknames: "Johnny" "Kentski" "Kentowski"
- Unit: No. 303 (Polish) Squadron RAF
- Commands: RAF Newton; RAF Tangmere; RAF Odiham; RAF Church Stanton; No. 92 Squadron RAF
- Conflicts: Second World War: Battle of France; Battle of Britain
- Awards: Distinguished Flying Cross & Bar; Air Force Cross; Silver Cross of the War Order of Virtuti Militari (Poland)
- Other work: Sales manager

Group Captain John Alexander Kent, DFC & Bar, AFC (23 June 1914 – 7 October 1985), nicknamed "Kentski" (sometimes given as "Kentowski") by his Polish comrades, was a Canadian fighter ace flying in the Royal Air Force during the Second World War. Considered one of the best young squadron leaders of the war, he went on to a distinguished postwar career before entering the aviation industry.

== Early years ==
John Alexander Kent was born in Winnipeg, in Manitoba, Canada on 23 June 1914. He started to learn to fly at Winnipeg Flying Club in 1930 and obtained his pilot's licence in November 1931, at the time, he was the youngest Canadian to achieve this feat. Two years later, he gained a commercial licence after working for the Northwest Aero Marine Company.

In 1935, Kent joined the Royal Air Force (RAF) on a short service commission. He was posted to No. 5 Flying Training School on 15 March. He joined No. 19 Squadron at RAF Duxford in February 1936, where he remained until October 1937 when he moved to the Royal Aircraft Establishment at Farnborough. For his research work, during which he deliberately made over 300 airborne collisions with various types of barrage balloon, he mainly flew the first prototype of the Fairey P.4/34 K5099.

Kent was awarded the Air Force Cross on 1 February 1939.

== Second World War ==
Kent was posted to the Photographic Development Unit in May 1940 flying unarmed Supermarine Spitfires in France. During the late stages of the fall of France, while on a low-level sortie with an armed Spitfire, he was attacked by a Messerschmitt Bf 109 that subsequently crashed during the encounter. (Note: Although the incident is described in his autobiography, Kent never claimed the destruction of the Bf 109.) By early July, he was posted to RAF Hawarden flying Hawker Hurricane fighters.

=== Battle of Britain ===
On 2 August 1940, as a flight commander, Kent joined No. 303 Squadron, a newly formed squadron consisting of Polish pilots based at RAF Northolt throughout the Battle of Britain.

Kent's first combat victories came on 9 September 1940 when he shot down a Messerschmitt Bf 110 heavy fighter and a Junkers Ju 88 medium bomber. On 23 September, he destroyed a Bf 109 and damaged a Focke-Wulf Fw 58 reconnaissance aircraft while intercepting a raid over Dungeness. He shot down a Ju 88 after a raid over London on 27 September.

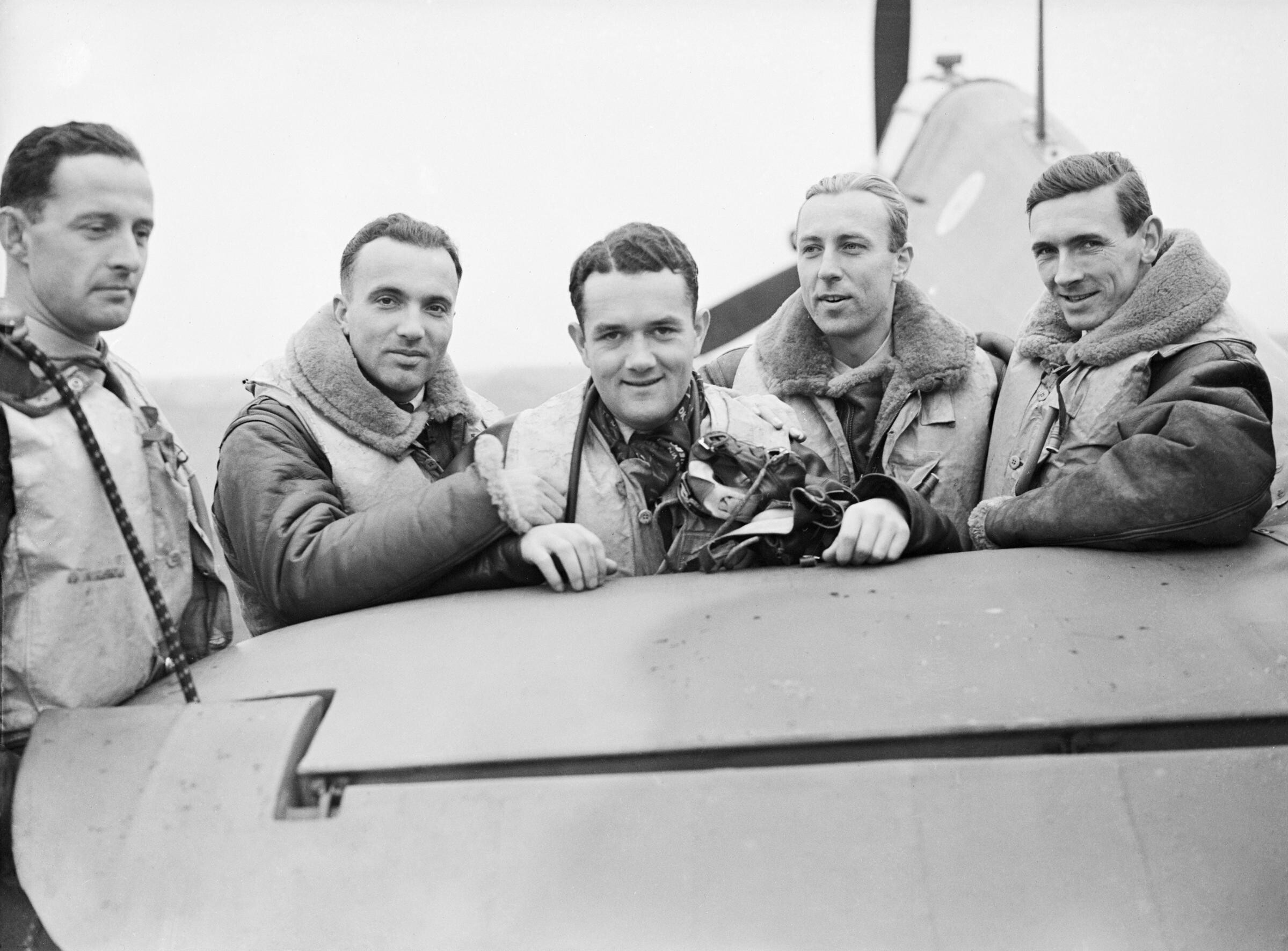
(Left to right) Pilot Officer Mirosław Ferić, Flying Officers Bogdan Grzeszczak, Jan Zumbach and Zdzisław Henneberg and Flight Lieutenant Kent, who commanded "A" Flight of No. 303 (Polish) Squadron RAF, October 1940.

During a dogfight over the south coast of England on 1 October, Kent found himself alone with 40 Bf 109s. In the ensuing engagement, he shot down two of the enemy fighters and scored hits on another. Kent was awarded the Distinguished Flying Cross (DFC) on 25 October 1940. The published citation read:

Early in October, 1940, this officer, when entirely alone, attacked 40 Messerschmitt 109's, and shot down two of them. He has personally destroyed at least four enemy aircraft. Flight Lieutenant Kent has been responsible in a large measure for the fighting efficiency of his squadron and has materially contributed to its successes. He has proved himself a born leader.

— London Gazette, No. 34978, 25 October 1940

The following day, he was posted to RAF Biggin Hill to take command of another highly successful group of pilots, No. 92 Squadron. Kent's strict discipline initially proved unpopular with the laid-back attitude the No. 92 Squadron pilots had at the time.

On 1 November, Kent shot down a Bf 109 and two more the following day. On 24 December 1940, he was awarded the Silver Cross of the Polish Virtuti Militari decoration for his achievements with No. 303 Squadron.

=== Circus offensive ===
In June 1941, Kent was then posted back to Northolt as wing leader of the Polish Wing of four squadrons. On 21 June, during an operation escorting Bristol Blenheim light bombers against German positions at Saint-Omer, France, Kent shot down a Bf 109. On 27 June, during another raid over northern France, he destroyed a Bf 109 on the ground.

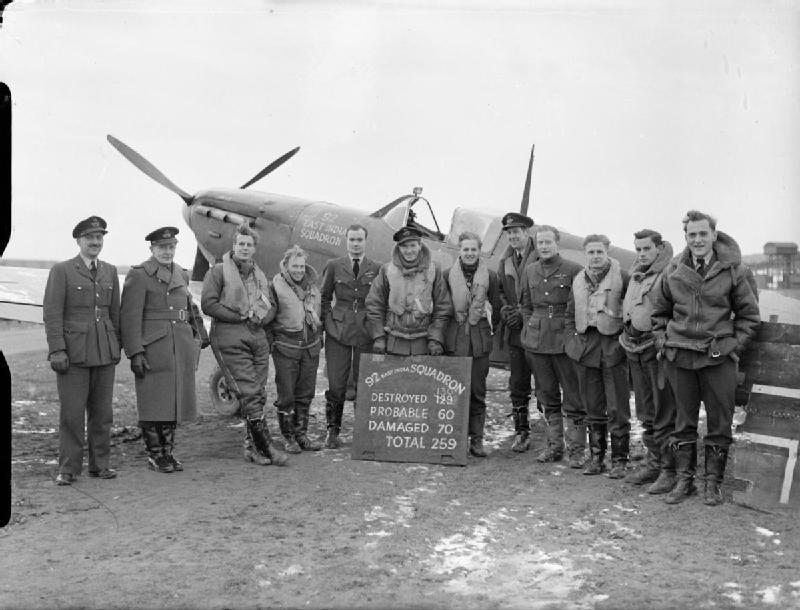
No. 92 Squadron pilots celebrating their 130th victory; Squadron Leader Kent in centre

As the raids over France continued from RAF Fighter Command during summer 1941, Kent continued adding to his score with a Bf 109 destroyed on 3 July and another Bf 109 on 20 July before he was then moved again as wing leader to command and lead the Kenley Wing in August 1941. His first few operations over northern France with his new squadrons proved successful, claiming Bf 109s on 7 and 16 August. Kent remained with the Kenley Wing until October 1941, when he was posted back to No. 53 Operational Training Unit at RAF Heston and then RAF Llandow. Kent was awarded a Bar to his DFC on 21 October 1941. The published citation read:

This officer has led his wing in an efficient and fearless manner on many operational sorties within the last two months. He has now destroyed a further 6 enemy aircraft, bringing his total successes to 13 destroyed and 3 probably destroyed. Wing Commander Kent has set a grand example.

— London Gazette, No. 35318, 21 October 1941

=== Later war service ===
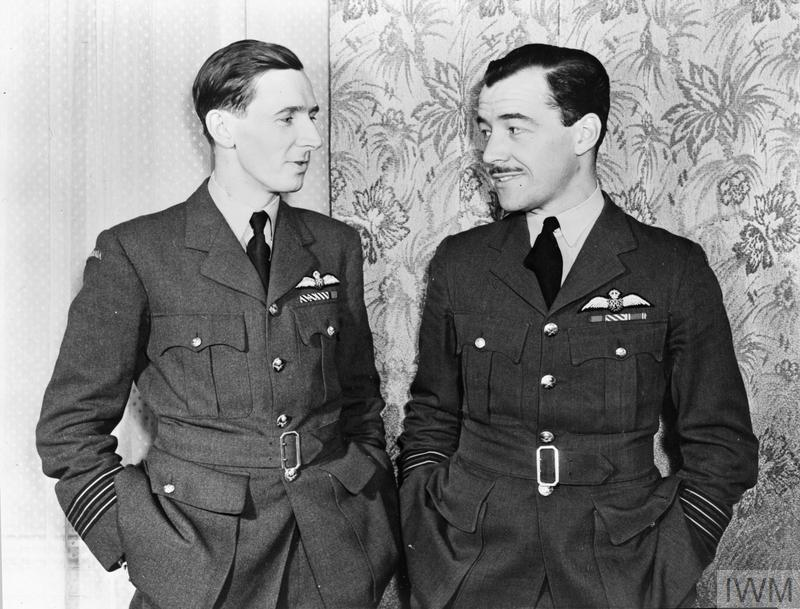
(Left to right) Wing Commander Kent talking to Wing Commander Zimmerman, 1942

Early in 1942, Kent was taken off operational status and sent on a lecture tour of Canada and the United States. (Note: While on leave from his lecture tour, Kent was able to visit his parents and family in Winnipeg.) In June 1942, Kent was posted as Station Commander of RAF Church Stanton, where he remained until October when he was posted to Fighter Command HQ as a Wing Commander of Training. Two months later, Kent was posted to the Middle East and took command of 17 Sector in Benghazi, Libya, where, on 25 January 1943, he damaged a Ju 88 during an engagement near the airfield at Benina. After a posting to Air HQ as a Command Training Inspector at Air Defences East Mediterranean, he returned to the United Kingdom during March 1944 for an instructor's course at the Central Flying School, Upavon.

Kent's final total of wartime victories included 13 aircraft destroyed, three probables and three damaged.

== Postwar ==
Kent was then posted to Air HQ, British Forces of Occupation and in late 1946 he became the Personal Staff Officer to Marshal of the Royal Air Force Sir Sholto Douglas, the Commander-in-Chief and Military Governor of the British Zone of occupied Germany.

Kent returned to flying duties as Chief Test Pilot at RAE Farnborough in 1948 and was involved until 1952 with many developments of military aviation, including the de Havilland Dh 108 "Swallow" and Avro 707. In August 1952, he assumed command of the RAF Station at Odiham, a fighter base operating Gloster Meteors. Subsequently, he was posted as Station Commander at RAF Tangmere, and in early 1956 accepted his final posting to RAF Newton as Station Commander.

On 1 December 1956, Kent retired from the RAF with the rank of group captain. He joined Kelvin-Hughes Aviation Limited as sales manager. His first marriage in 1939 was dissolved and he remarried in 1948. His family with a son and two daughters lived at Hartley Wintney, Hants.

Kent died on 7 October 1985 in Woking, Surrey at the age of 71 years. His medals, which in addition to the DFC and Bar, the AFC and the Virtuti Militari, include the 1939–1945 Star with Battle of Britain clasp, Air Crew Europe Star, Africa Star with North Africa 1942-43 clasp, Italy Star, Defence Medal, War Medal 1939–1945, and the 1953 Coronation Medal, are held by the Royal Air Force Museum.

== Quotes ==
"I cannot say how proud I am to have been privileged to help form and lead No. 303 squadron and later to lead such a magnificent fighting force as the Polish Wing. There formed within me in those days an admiration, respect and genuine affection for these really remarkable men which I have never lost. I formed friendship that are as firm as they were those twenty-five years ago and this I find most gratifying. We who were privileged to fly and fight with them will never forget and Britain must never forget how much she owes to the loyalty indomitable spirit and sacrifice of those Polish fliers. They were our staunchest Allies in our darkest days; may they always be remembered as such!"

== In popular culture ==
Kent was portrayed by Milo Gibson in the 2018 film Hurricane: 303 Squadron.
