= Hawker Hotspur =

1938 prototype fighter aircraft

Hotspur
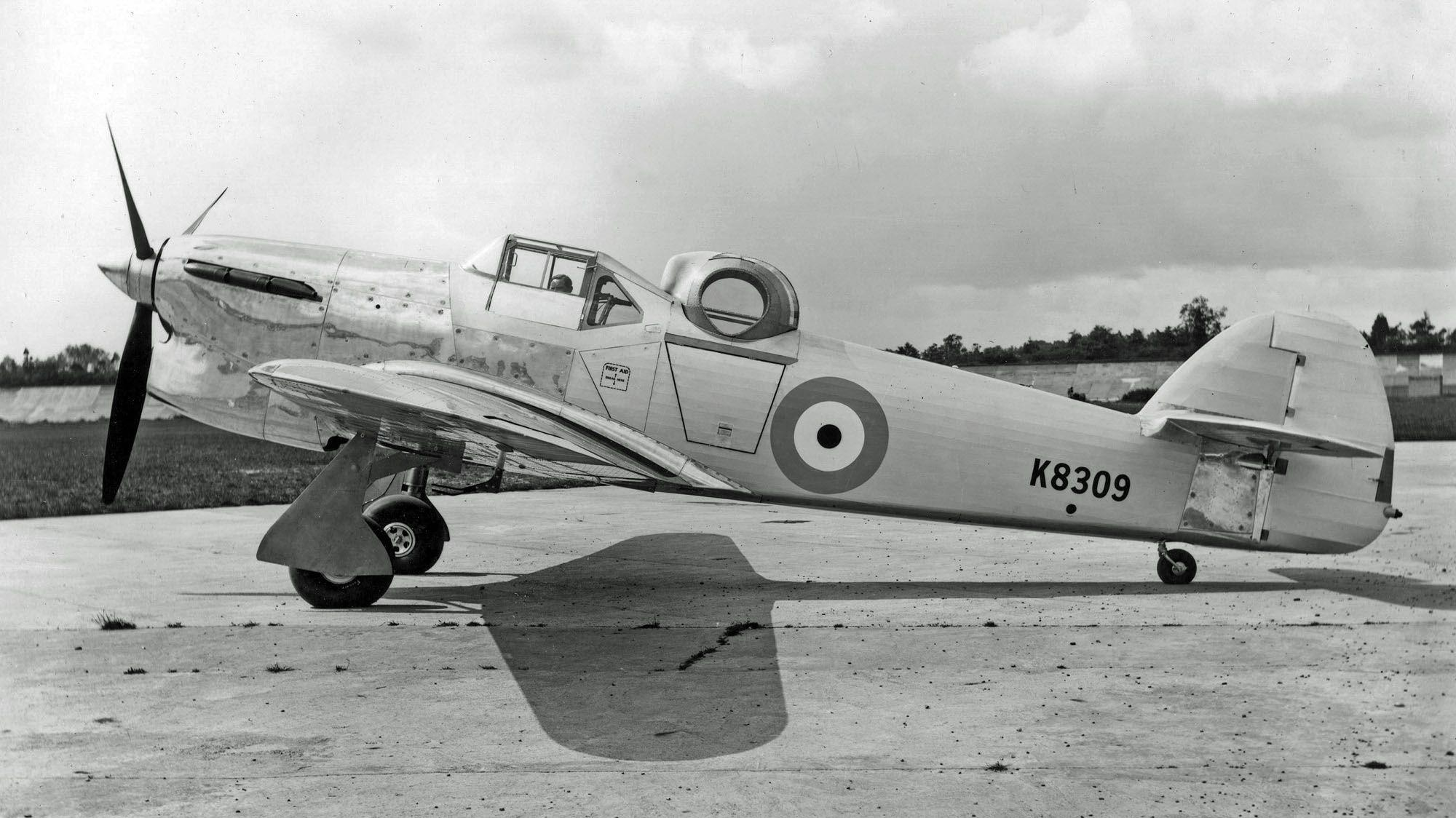
- Hawker Hotspur

General information
- Type: Fighter aircraft
- Manufacturer: Hawker
- Designer: Sydney Camm
- Primary user: Royal Air Force
- Number built: 1

History
- First flight: 14 June 1938
- Developed from: Hawker Henley

The Hawker Hotspur was a fighter aircraft developed between the wars for the Royal Air Force. It was designed in response to Air Ministry Specification F.9/35, which required a powered turret as the main armament to replace the Hawker Demon. It was developed from the Hawker Henley, a competitor for the light bomber role but put into production as a target tug, and fitted with a Boulton-Paul powered four gun turret.

== Design and development ==
The Air Ministry released Specification F.9/35, which required a two-seater day and night "turret fighter" capable of 290 mph (470 km/h) at 15,000 ft (4,600 m) to British manufacturers in 1935. The aircraft was to have its armament (four machine guns) concentrated in a power-operated turret, and performance was to be only slightly less than that of other fighter designs being developed at that time. It was also to have enough fuel capacity to perform standing patrols.

There were seven responses to the tender: Armstrong Whitworth (twin-engines, based on the AW.34), Boulton and Paul (P.82), Bristol (Type 147), Fairey, Gloster, Hawker, and Supermarine (Type 305). An eighth company, Vickers, did start on a design but did not provide it to the Air Ministry. As Hawker were already engaged in building the Henley prototype, their submission was based on that with a turret to be provided by Nash & Thompson. The Hawker, Boulton Paul and Armstrong Whitworth designs were judged the most promising and two prototypes of each were ordered though the Armstrong Whitworth design was not in the end built.

In the same fashion as the Henley, the Hotspur used standard Hawker Hurricane outer wing panels. One prototype aircraft, K8309, was built in 1937, fitted with armament of four 0.303 in (7.7 mm) Browning machine guns in a Boulton Paul dorsal turret plus one .303 in (7.7 mm) Vickers machine gun mounted in the front fuselage.

In 1937, the competing Boulton Paul received an order for 87 Defiants and Hawker for 389 Hotspurs (to be built at Avro). For naval use the Blackburn Roc turret fighter was also ordered though the 136 aircraft were to be built by Boulton Paul. In January 1938 an official opinion was that the Defiant and Hotspur would be equal in performance but Hawker had shown insufficient enthusiasm in the project. The Hotspur production order was cancelled, more Defiants ordered in their place. A second Hotspur prototype was cancelled.

The completion of the prototype was delayed until 1938, by which time the rival Boulton Paul Defiant had already flown. The Hotspur first flew, at Brooklands, on 14 June 1938 with only a wooden mock-up of the turret and with ballast equivalent to the weight of armament. It was then tested at Martlesham Heath.

== Testing and evaluation ==
As Hawker was committed to the production of Hurricanes and sister company Gloster to Henley production, there was insufficient capacity to introduce another type and production was abandoned. The mock-up turret was removed and a cockpit fairing installed. Planned production by Avro to Specification 17/36 was abandoned and the prototype, less turret, was used at the RAE Farnborough from 1939 to test flap and dive brake configurations alongside the Hawker Henley until 1942. On 12 February following an engine problem during a gliding test the pilot was forced to make a gear up belly landing; while the damage was judged to be repairable the Hotspur was scrapped rather than incur the cost.

== Specifications (Hotspur) ==
Orthographic projection of the Hotspur prototype, without armament fitted.

Data from Hawker Aircraft since 1920

General characteristics

- Crew: 2 (pilot & gunner)
- Length: 32 ft 10.5 in (10.02 m)
- Wingspan: 40 ft 6 in (12.34 m)
- Height: 13 ft 10 in (4.22 m)
- Wing area: 342 sq ft (31.8 m^{2})
- Empty weight: 5,800 lb (2,630 kg)
- Max takeoff weight: 7,650 lb (3,470 kg)
- Powerplant: 1 × Rolls-Royce Merlin II V-12 inline piston engine, 1,030 hp (768 kW)

Performance

- Maximum speed: 316 mph (510 km/h, 275 kn)
- Service ceiling: 28,000 ft (8,500 m)

Armament

- Guns: ** 4 × .303 in (7.7 mm) Browning machine guns in a Boulton-Paul turret.
  - 1 × .303 in (7.7 mm) Vickers machine gun in nose

== See also ==
Related development

- Hawker Henley

Aircraft of comparable role, configuration, and era

- Blackburn Roc
- Boulton Paul Defiant

Related lists

- List of aircraft of the Royal Air Force
- List of fighter aircraft
