= RAF Perranporth =

Former RAF base in Cornwall, England

RAF Perranporth
- Near Perranporth, Cornwall in England

Site information
- Type: Royal Air Force satellite station
- Code: PP
- Owner: Air Ministry
- Operator: Royal Air Force
- Controlled by: RAF Fighter Command 1941-44 * No. 10 Group RAF; RAF Coastal Command 1944 * No. 19 Group RAF; RAF Transport Command 1944- * No. 46 Group RAF

Location
- Shown within Cornwall RAF Perranporth (the United Kingdom)
- Coordinates: 50°19′53″N 005°10′36″W

Site history
- Built: 1940/41
- In use: April 1941 – April 1946
- Battles/wars: European theatre of World War II

Airfield information
- Elevation: 320 feet (98 m) AMSL
Runways
Direction	Length and surface
05/23	Tarmac
09/27	Tarmac
18/36	Tarmac

Royal Air Force Perranporth or more simply RAF Perranporth is a former Royal Air Force satellite station situated near Perranporth, Cornwall, England.

== History ==
The 330 acre (134 hectares) airfield was built as an RAF Fighter Command station in the Second World War in 1941 and is situated on Cligga cliffs in the north of Cornwall.

Rare 1942 film footage of RAF pilots and Spitfires at RAF Perranporth is shown on the BBC website.

=== Squadrons ===
- No. 19 Squadron RAF
- No. 65 (East India) Squadron RAF
- No. 66 Squadron RAF
- No. 118 Squadron RAF
- No. 130 (Punjab) Squadron RAF
- No. 132 (City of Bombay) Squadron RAF
- No. 183 (Gold Coast) Squadron RAF
- No. 234 (Madras Presidency) Squadron RAF
- No. 276 Squadron RAF
- No. 286 Squadron RAF
- No. 302 Polish Fighter Squadron
- No. 310 (Czechoslovak) Squadron RAF
- No. 317 Polish Fighter Squadron
- No. 329 (GC I/2 'Cicognes') Squadron RAF
- No. 340 (GC IV/2 Île-de-France) Squadron RAF
- No. 341 (GC III/2 'Alsace') Squadron RAF
- No. 412 Squadron RCAF
- No. 453 Squadron RAAF
- No. 602 (City of Glasgow) Squadron AAF
- No. 610 (County of Chester) Squadron AAF
- No. 639 Squadron RAF

=== Units ===
- No. 18 Terminal Staging Post
- No. 19 Terminal Staging Post
- No. 92 Staging Post
- No. 95 Gliding School RAF
- No. 120 (Major) Staging Post
- No. 122 (Major) Staging Post
- No. 123 (Major) Staging Post
- No. 145 (French) Airfield Headquarters RAF
- No. 1602 (Anti-Aircraft Co-operation) Flight RAF
- No. 2828 Squadron RAF Regiment
- Air Sea Rescue Flight RAF, Perranporth (1941) became 'C' Flight, No. 276 Squadron RAF

== Current use ==
The airfield was later converted to civilian use as Perranporth Airfield; it currently has three hard surface runways and two grass strips.
