= Rew Down =

Nature reserve on the Isle of Wight, England

Coordinates: 50.596°N 1.226°W

- Site of Special Scientific Interest
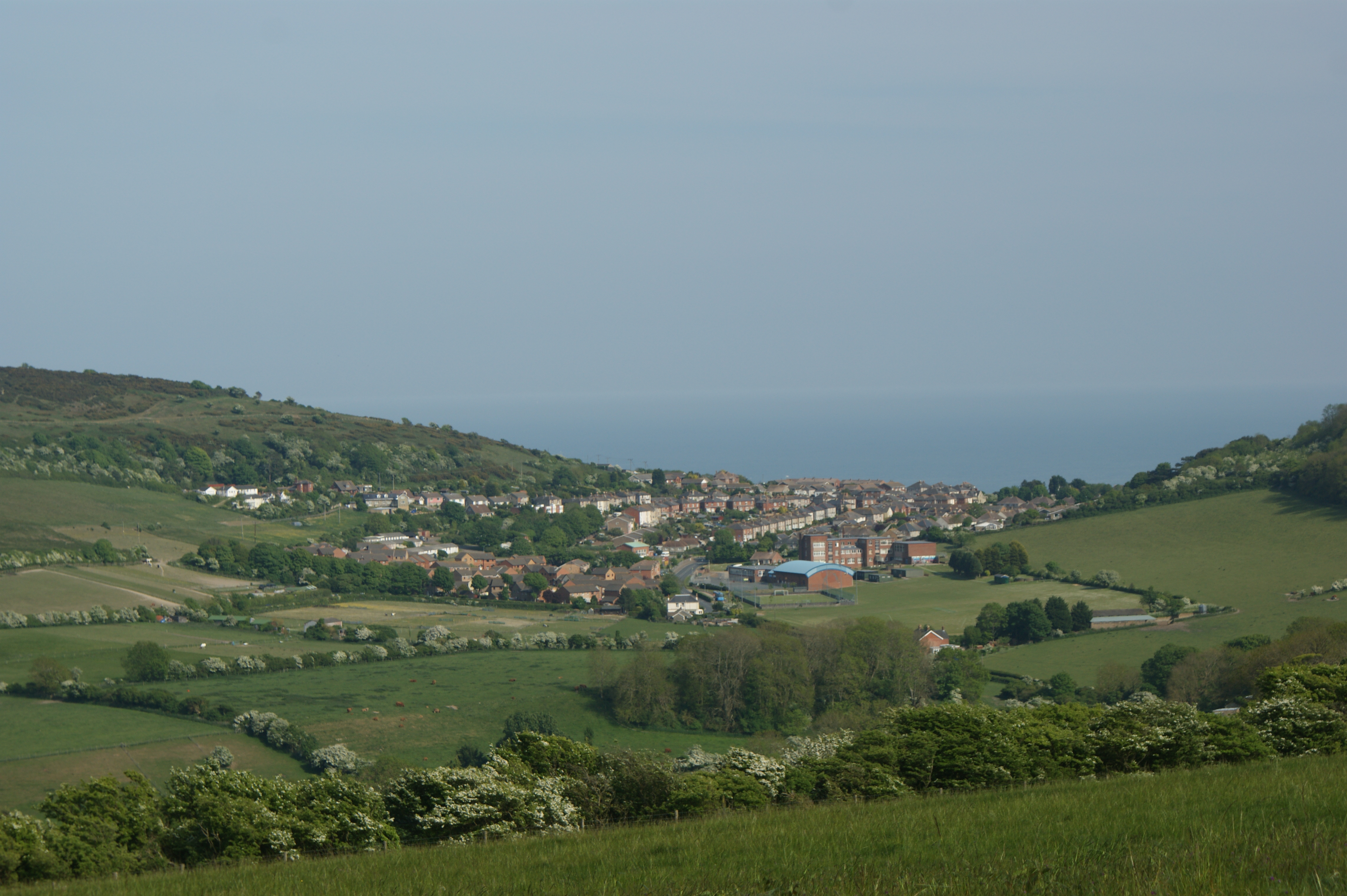
- Looking towards Ventnor from Rew Down
- Location of Rew Down.
- Area of search: Isle of Wight
- Grid reference: SZ550775
- Interest: Biological
- Area: 23.5 ha (58 acres)
- Notification date: 1977
- Location map: Natural England

Rew Down is a 23.5-hectare biological Site of Special Scientific Interest and Local Nature Reserve located on the south-east edge of the Isle of Wight in the hills to the west of Ventnor.

The area is a chalk grassland sloping to the south and offering panoramic and far-reaching views of the English Channel. It has the Stenbury Trail running along its western boundary and the Ventnor golf club to the north.

It is managed by the Isle of Wight Council and is noted for its Highland cattle, which have grazed the land since 2003.

The area contains the remains of the tower base of, Historic England Grade II listed, Royal Navy World War II direction finding (D/F) station (one of the'Y-stations'), Ventnor, which is believed to be the most complete of its type still extant.
