= Hawker Henley =

Aircraft in the Royal Air Force

Henley
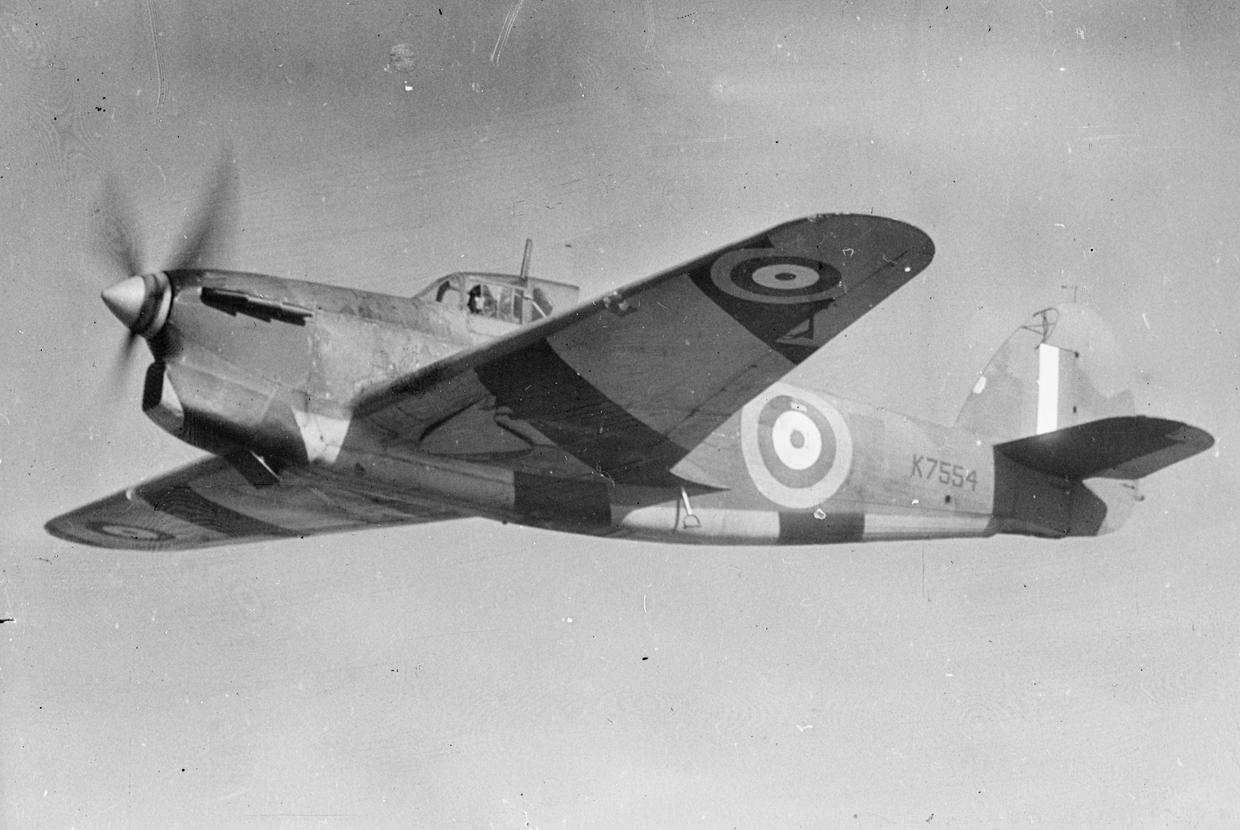

General information
- Type: Target tug
- National origin: United Kingdom
- Manufacturer: Hawker Aircraft, Gloster Aircraft
- Primary user: Royal Air Force
- Number built: 202

History
- Introduction date: 1938
- First flight: 10 March 1937
- Retired: 1945
- Developed from: Hawker Hurricane
- Developed into: Hawker Hotspur

The Hawker Henley was a British two-seat target tug derived from the Hawker Hurricane that was operated by the Royal Air Force during the Second World War.

== Design and development ==
In 1934 Air Ministry Specification P.4/34 was issued which called for a light bomber that could also be deployed in a close-support role as a dive-bomber. Fairey, Gloster and Hawker each offered designs to fill this role. As the aircraft only required a modest bomb load and with performance paramount, Hawker developed an aircraft similar to their Hurricane fighter.

The Hurricane was then in an advanced stage of development and there would be economies of scale if some assemblies were common to both aircraft. This resulted in the Henley sharing outer wing panels and tailplanes with the Hurricane. Both were equipped with the Rolls-Royce Merlin engine which offered the best power-weight ratio and minimized frontal area. The Henley's cantilever fabric-covered monoplane wing was mid-set, a retractable tail wheel landing gear was selected and accommodation provided for a pilot and observer/air gunner.

Although construction of the Henley prototype began in mid-1935, the Hurricane had priority, and it was not until 10 March 1937, powered by a Merlin "F" engine, that it first flew at Brooklands, shortly after the competing Fairey P.4/34. The aircraft was refitted with light alloy stressed-skin wings and a Merlin I engine (the production version of the F) and further test flights confirmed a top speed of 300 mph (480 km/h), which met the RAF's requirements.

By this time the Air Ministry had dropped its requirement for a light bomber, possibly because this role was adequately filled by the Fairey Battle. The Henley was never fitted with dive brakes, bomb crutches or dive bombing sights, which limited attack angles to under 70° and reduced accuracy, and was instead relegated to target-towing.

The Air Ministry's decision to abandon work on dive bombers in 1938 had much to do with the danger of engine overspeed in a dive. This could be alleviated by the use of a constant speed propeller, but these were not available in sufficient numbers until 1940 when they were urgently needed for Hurricanes.

The Hawker Henley was also used as an engine test bed, the original prototype (K5115) being fitted with a Rolls-Royce Vulture, 24-cylinder engine in 1939. Henley production was subcontracted to Gloster and 200 were ordered into production. The second prototype was fitted with a propeller-driven winch to haul in a target tug's drogue cable after air-to-air firing sorties and first flew on 26 May 1938.

== Operational history ==
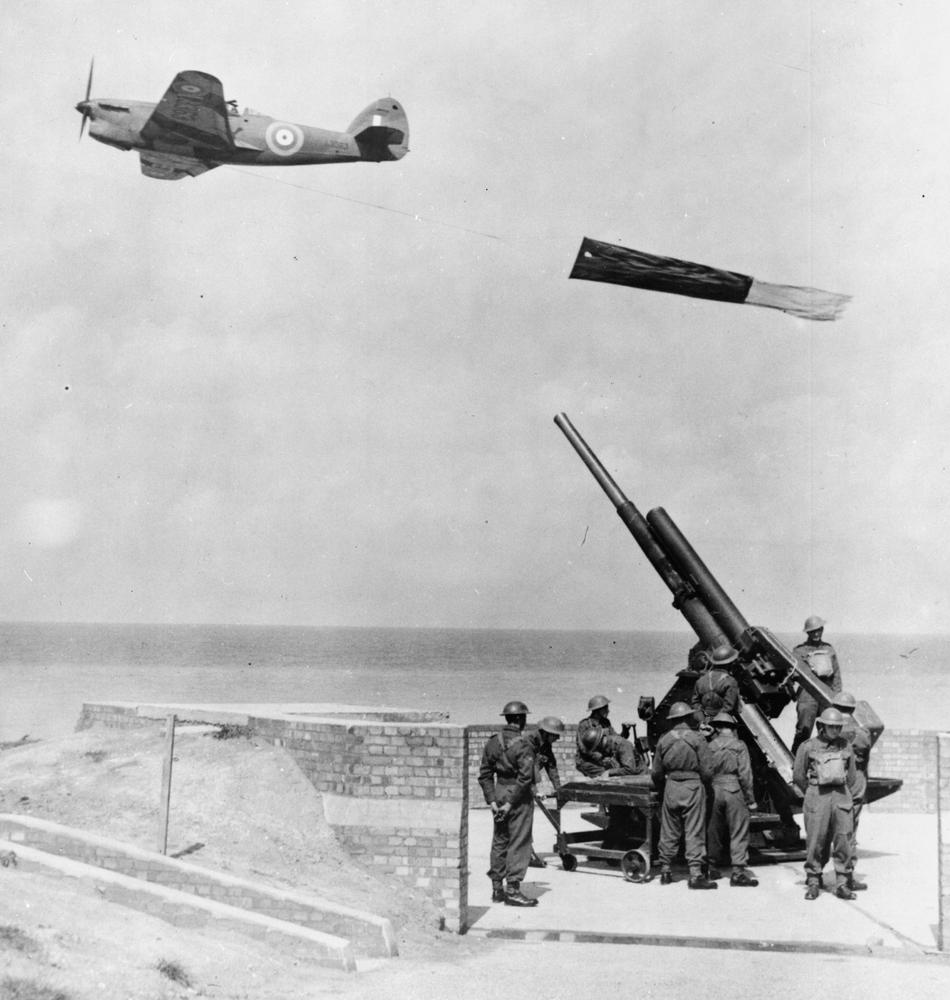
Hawker Henley deploying drogue target

Production Henley TT.III target tug aircraft entered service with Nos. 1, 5 and 10 Bombing and Gunnery Schools, as well as with the Air Gunnery Schools at Barrow, Millom and Squires Gate. Unfortunately, unless the aircraft were restricted to an unrealistically low towing speed of 220 mph (350 km/h), engine failures was unacceptably frequent, which was attributed to the cooling system matching the Henley's original mission but inadequate when towing a target, with its substantial drag, which resulted in high engine speeds but low airspeed. Henleys were transferred to anti-aircraft co-operation units but the drogues used for these were even larger and engine failures further increased, while there were also difficulties in releasing the drogues. Several Henleys were lost when the drogue could not be released quickly enough. No solution was found and in mid-1942, the Henley was withdrawn in favour of modified Boulton Paul Defiants and purpose-built Miles Martinet aircraft.

== Variants ==
Henley I
Prototype.
Henley II
Second prototype.
Henley III
Two-seat target tug aircraft for the RAF, 200 built.
Hawker Hotspur
Prototype two seater fighter variant of the Henley with a four-gun power-driven turret. This did not reach production, the requirement being met by the Defiant.

== Operators ==
United Kingdom

- Royal Air Force
  - No. 264 Squadron RAF
  - No. 266 Squadron RAF
  - No. 291 Squadron RAF
  - No. 587 Squadron RAF
  - No. 595 Squadron RAF
  - No. 631 Squadron RAF
  - No. 639 Squadron RAF
  - No. 679 Squadron RAF
  - No. 695 Squadron RAF

== Specifications (Henley Mk III) ==
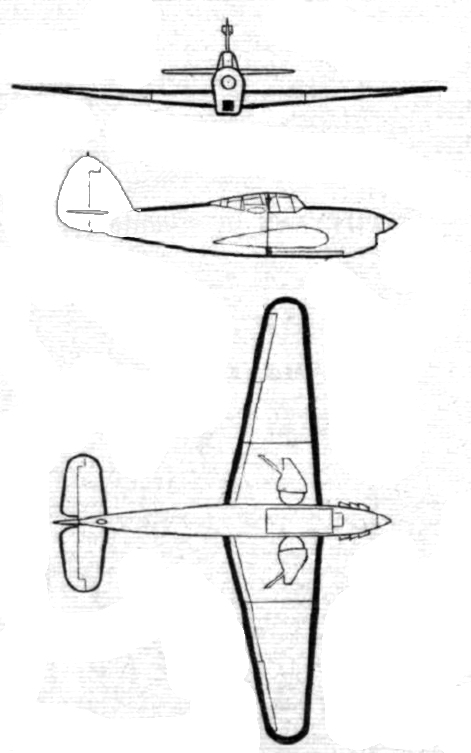

Data from Hawker aircraft since 1920

General characteristics

- Crew: 2
- Length: 36 ft 5 in (11.10 m)
- Wingspan: 47 ft 10.5 in (14.592 m)
- Height: 14 ft 7.5 in (4.458 m)
- Wing area: 342 sq ft (31.8 m^{2})
- Airfoil: root: Clark YH mod (20%); tip: Clark YH mod (12%)
- Empty weight: 6,010 lb (2,726 kg)
- Max takeoff weight: 8,840 lb (4,010 kg)
- Powerplant: 1 × Rolls-Royce Merlin II V-12 liquid-cooled piston engine, 1,030 hp (770 kW)
- Propellers: 3-bladed de Havilland two-pitch propeller

Performance

- Maximum speed: 294 mph (473 km/h, 255 kn)
- Cruise speed: 235 mph (378 km/h, 204 kn) at 15,000 ft (4,600 m)
- Target-towing speed: 272 mph (438 km/h) at 17,500 ft (5,300 m)
- Range: 950 mi (1,530 km, 830 nmi)
- Service ceiling: 27,000 ft (8,200 m)
- Rate of climb: 1,150 ft/min (5.8 m/s)
- Wing loading: 25.9 lb/sq ft (126 kg/m^{2})
- Power/mass: 0.12 hp/lb (0.20 kW/kg)

== See also ==
Related development

- Hawker Hotspur
- Hawker Hurricane

Aircraft of comparable role, configuration, and era

- Fairey P.4/34
- Fairey Battle
