= Hawklaw Y Station =

Coordinates: 56.32997°N 3.00768°W

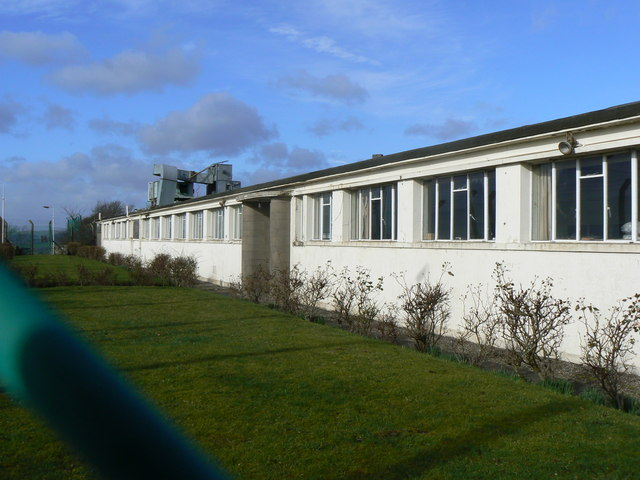
Hawklaw

Hawklaw Y Station was a Government listening station located north of Cupar in Fife which operated between 1942 and 1988.

== History ==
The building was built with windows in the Art Deco style and completed by 1942. During the Second World War it operated as a Y-station collecting information for analysts at Bletchley Park. Unlike other Y stations Hawklaw did not close after the War but continued as a Cold War monitoring station under the aegis of Government Communications Headquarters until it closed in 1988.

== Today ==
In 2024, Hawklaw's buildings were being converted into a family home.
