= Brora Y Station =

- Shown in Highland
- 58.00700°N 3.84845°W

History
- Built: 1940

Brora Y Station was a Government listening station located South-east of Brora in Sutherland, Scotland which operated between 1940 and 1986.

== History ==
The building was built for the General Post Office and completed by 1939. During the Second World War it operated as a Y-station, collecting information for analysts at Bletchley Park. Unlike other Y stations Brora did not close after the War but continued as a Cold War monitoring station under the aegis of Government Communications Headquarters (GCHQ) until it closed in 1986.
