= No. 639 Squadron RAF =

Defunct flying squadron of the Royal Air Force

- Active: 1 December 1943 – 30 April 1945
- Country: United Kingdom
- Branch: Royal Air Force
- Role: anti aircraft co-operation
- Part of: No. 70 Group RAF, RAF Fighter Command
- Station: RAF Cleave

Insignia
- Squadron Codes: R9 (Dec 1943 – Apr 1945)

No. 639 Squadron RAF was an anti aircraft co-operation squadron of the Royal Air Force from 1943 to 1945.

== History ==
The squadron was formed at RAF Cleave on 1 December 1943, from 1602 Flight, 1603 Flight, 1604 Flight and 1618 Flight for anti-aircraft co-operation duties with the Hawker Henley. The main role was to provide target towing duties over Cornwall. In addition the Hawker Hurricane was used as a radar target and to fly low-level simulated attacks on troops. The squadron was disbanded on 30 April 1945.

== Aircraft operated ==
Aircraft operated by no. 639 Squadron RAF, data from
| From | To | Aircraft | Version |
|---|---|---|---|
| December 1943 | April 1945 | Hawker Henley | Mk.III |
| August 1944 | April 1945 | Hawker Hurricane | Mks.IIc, IV |

== Squadron bases ==
Bases and airfields used by no. 639 Squadron RAF, data from
| From | To | Base | Remarks |
|---|---|---|---|
| 1 December 1943 | 30 April 1945 | RAF Cleave, Cornwall | Dets. at RAF Portreath, Cornwall and RAF Perranporth, Cornwall |

== See also ==
- List of Royal Air Force aircraft squadrons
