= Y service =

British signals intelligence collection sites during WW1 and WW2

The "Y" service was a network of British signals intelligence collection sites, the Y-stations. The service was established during the First World War and used again during the Second World War. The sites were operated by a range of agencies including the Army, Navy and RAF, and the Foreign Office (MI6 and MI5). The General Post Office and the Marconi Company provided some receiving stations, ashore and afloat. There were more than 600 receiving sets in use at Y-stations during the Second World War.

== Role ==
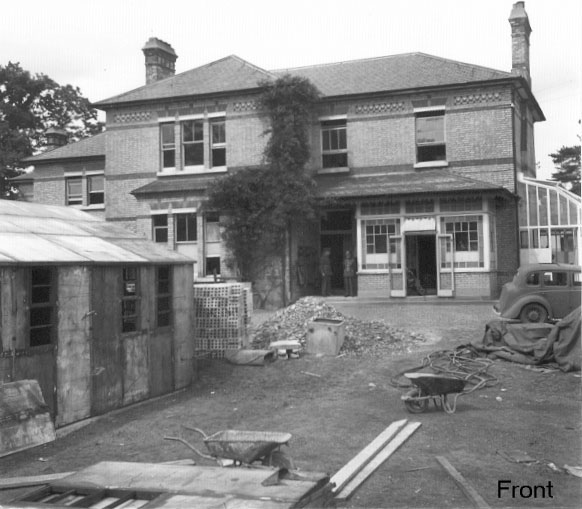
Arkley View, 1943

The "Y" name derived from Wireless Interception (WI). The stations tended to be one of two types, for intercepting the signals and for identifying where they were coming from. Sometimes both functions were operated at the same site, with the direction finding (D/F) hut being a few hundred metres from the main interception building to minimise interference. The sites collected radio traffic which was then either analysed locally or, if encrypted, passed for processing initially to the Admiralty Room 40 in London and then during World War II to the Government Code and Cypher School at Bletchley Park in Buckinghamshire.

In the Second World War a large house called "Arkley View" on the outskirts of Barnet (now part of the London Borough of Barnet) acted as a data collection centre, where traffic was collated and passed to Bletchley Park; it also housed a Y station. Much of the traffic intercepted by the Y stations was recorded by hand and sent to Bletchley by motorcycle couriers, and later by teleprinter over Post Office landlines. Many amateur radio operators supported the work of the Y stations, being enrolled as "Voluntary Interceptors".

The term was also used for similar stations attached to the India outpost of the Intelligence Corps, the Wireless Experimental Centre (WEC) outside Delhi.

== Direction-finding Y stations ==
Specially constructed Y stations undertook high-frequency direction finding (D/F) of wireless transmissions. This became particularly important in the Battle of the Atlantic where locating U-boats was vital. Admiral Dönitz told his commanders that they could not be located if they limited their wireless transmissions to under 30 seconds, but skilled D/F operators were able to locate the origin of their signals in as few as six seconds.

The design of land-based D/F stations preferred by the Allies during the Second World War was the U-Adcock system, where a small operators' hut was surrounded by four 10 ft-high (3.0 m) vertical aerial poles, usually placed at the points of the compass. Aerial feeders ran underground, surfaced in the centre of the hut and were connected to a direction finding goniometer and a wireless receiver, that allowed the bearing of the signal source to be measured. In the UK some operators were located in an underground metal tank. These stations were usually in remote places, often in the middle of farmers' fields. Traces of Second World War D/F stations can be seen as circles in the fields surrounding the village of Goonhavern in Cornwall.

== Y station sites in Britain ==
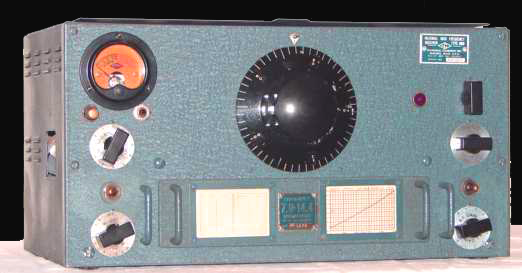
The National HRO communication receiver was extensively used by the RSS and Y service

- Beachy Head, Sussex
- Beaumanor Hall, near Loughborough, Leicestershire (operated by the Army)
- Beeston Hill, Beeston Regis, Norfolk
- Bishop's Waltham, Hampshire (operated by the Army)
- Brora, Sutherland
- RAF Canterbury, Kent
- RAF Cheadle, Cheadle, Staffordshire
- RAF Chicksands, Bedfordshire (operated by the RAF)
- RAF Clophill, Bedfordshire
- Cromer, Norfolk
- Forest Moor, near Harrogate (operated by the Army)
- G.P.O. Transatlantic Radiophone Station Kemback, near Cupar, Fife
- Denmark Hill, Camberwell (operated by the Metropolitan Police and General Post Office (GPO) for the Foreign Office)
- Met Office Dunstable, Bedfordshire
- Felixstowe, Suffolk
- Gilnahirk, Belfast
- Gorleston, Norfolk
- Hall Place, Kent
- Harpenden, Hertfordshire (Army, No. 1 Special Wireless Group)
- Hawklaw, Fife
- HMS Flowerdown, Winchester, Hampshire
- HMS Forest Moor, Harrogate, Yorkshire
- Kedleston Hall, Derbyshire
- RAF Kingsdown, Hollywood Manor, West Kingsdown, Kent
- RAF Monks Risborough, Monks Risborough, Buckinghamshire
- Knockholt, Kent (run by the Foreign Office for non-Morse radiotelegraphy signals)
- Markyate, Hertfordshire (operated by the Army)
- Newbold Revel, RAF 'Y' Service Secret Intelligence and German Telephony Communications Base, Warwickshire.
- North Walsham, Norfolk
- Sandridge, Hertfordshire (operated by the Foreign Office)
- Saxmundham, Suffolk
- Scarborough, Yorkshire (operated by the Royal Navy)
- St Erth, Cornwall
- Shenley Brook End Milton Keynes (operated by the Army)
- South Walsham, Norfolk
- Southwold, Suffolk
- Stockland Bristol, near Bridgwater, Somerset
- Stockton-on-Tees, Cleveland
- HMS Ventnor, Rew Down, Isle of Wight
- RAF Waddington, Lincolnshire
- Whitchurch, Shropshire in The Old Rectory, Claypit Street (operated by the Foreign Office)
- Wick (operated by the RAF)
- Wincombe, Donhead St Mary, Wiltshire (operated by the GPO for the Foreign Office)
- Withernsea, East Yorkshire from a pub, the St. Leonards, now known as Captain Williams
- Woodcock Hill, Sandridge, St Albans

== Bibliography ==
- Kenyon, David (10 May 2019), Bletchley Park and D-Day: The Untold Story of How the Battle for Normandy Was Won, Yale University Press, ISBN 978-0-300-24357-4
- McKay, Sinclair (2012), Secret Listeners: How the Y Service Intercepted German Codes for Bletchley Park, Aurum, ISBN 978-1-84513-763-2
- Macksey, Kenneth (2003). The Searchers: Radio Intercept in Two World Wars. London: Cassell. ISBN 0-304-36545-9.
