= Ballon-Saint Mars =

- Commune
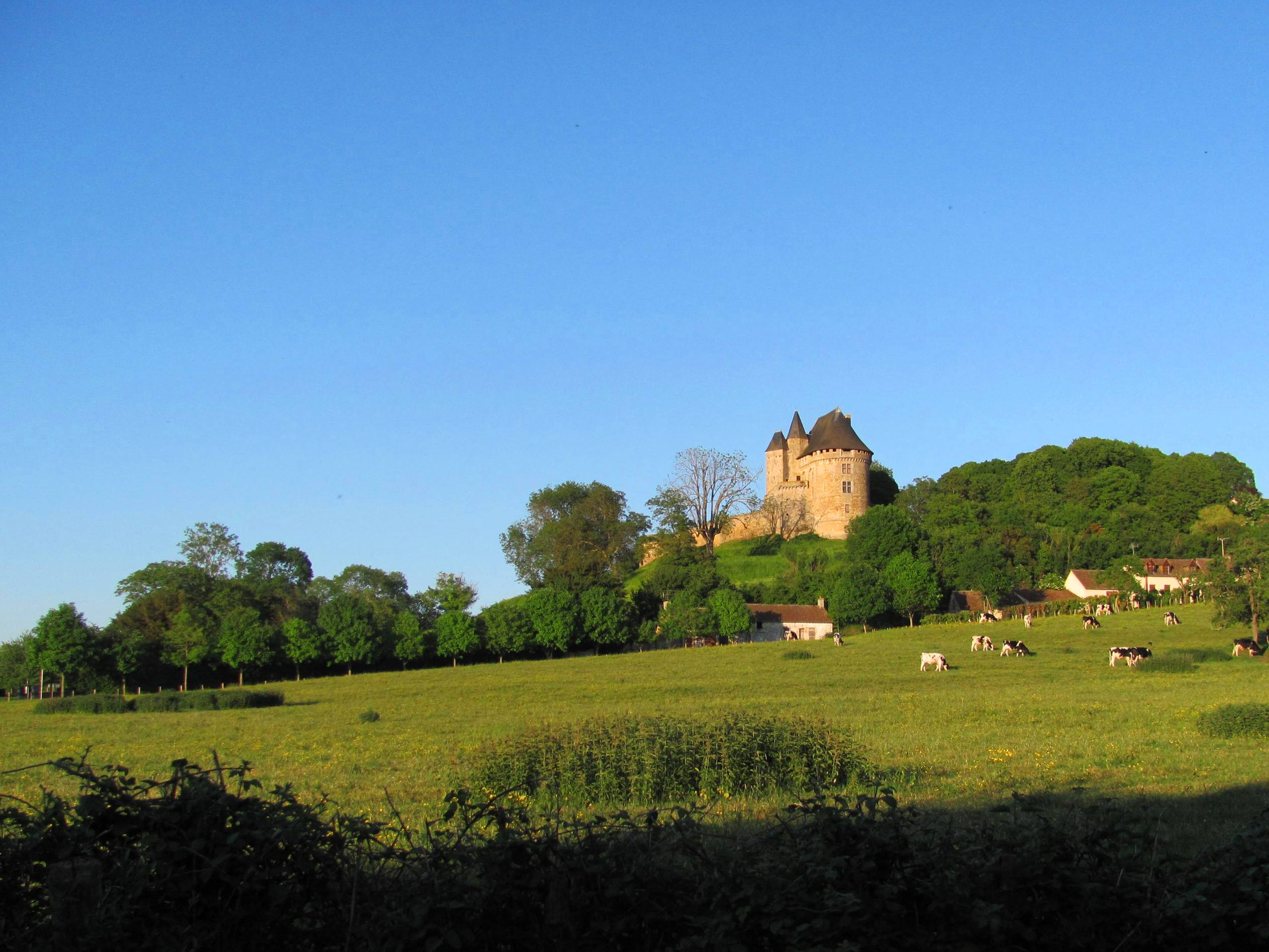
- The Château de Ballon
- Location of Ballon-Saint Mars
- Location within France Location within Pays de la Loire
- Coordinates: 48°10′34″N 0°14′02″E
- Country: France
- Region: Pays de la Loire
- Department: Sarthe
- Arrondissement: Le Mans
- Canton: Bonnétable

Government
  - Mayor (2020–2026): Maurice Vavasseur
- Area^{1}: 31.61 km^{2} (12.20 sq mi)
- Population (2023): 2,273
  - Density: 71.91/km^{2} (186.2/sq mi)
- Time zone: UTC+01:00 (CET)
  - Summer (DST): UTC+02:00 (CEST)
- INSEE/Postal code: 72023 /72290
- ^{1} French Land Register data, which excludes lakes, ponds, glaciers > 1 km^{2} (0.386 sq mi or 247 acres) and river estuaries.

Ballon-Saint Mars (French pronunciation: [balɔ̃ sɛ̃ maʁ]) is a commune in the department of Sarthe, western France. The municipality was established on 1 January 2016 by merger of the former communes of Ballon and Saint-Mars-sous-Ballon.

== History ==
The creation of the new commune of «Ballon-Saint Mars» was decided by a vote of the municipal councils of the communes of Ballon and Saint-Mars-sous-Ballon on 25 June 2015, after several months of negotiations.

== Population ==
Population data refer to the area corresponding with the commune as of January 2025.

Historical population
Year	Pop.	±% p.a.
1968	1,903	—
1975	1,911	+0.06%
1982	1,865	−0.35%
1990	1,817	−0.33%
1999	2,004	+1.09%
2007	2,127	+0.75%
2012	2,163	+0.34%
2017	2,230	+0.61%
2023	2,273	+0.32%
Source: INSEE

== Notable people ==
- Wynebald de Ballon, Anglo-Norman magnate
- Hamelin de Ballon, Anglo-Norman magnate

== See also ==
- Communes of the Sarthe department
