= Ampney =

Ampney may refer to:

== Places ==
- Ampney Brook, a river in Gloucestershire, England
- Ampney Crucis, a village and civil parish in the Cotswolds, part of the Cotswold District of Gloucestershire, England
- Ampney St Mary, a village and civil parish in the Cotswolds, part of the Cotswold of Gloucestershire, England
- Ampney St Peter, a village and civil parish in the Cotswolds, part of the Cotswold of Gloucestershire, England
- Down Ampney, a village in the Cotswold district of Gloucestershire, England
- RAF Down Ampney, a Royal Air Force station near Cricklade, Wiltshire and RAF Fairford, Gloucestershire

== People ==
- Anthony Hungerford of Down Ampney, a Member of Parliament for Gloucestershire
