= North Cadbury =

Village in Somerset, England

Coordinates: 51.0456°N 2.5220°W

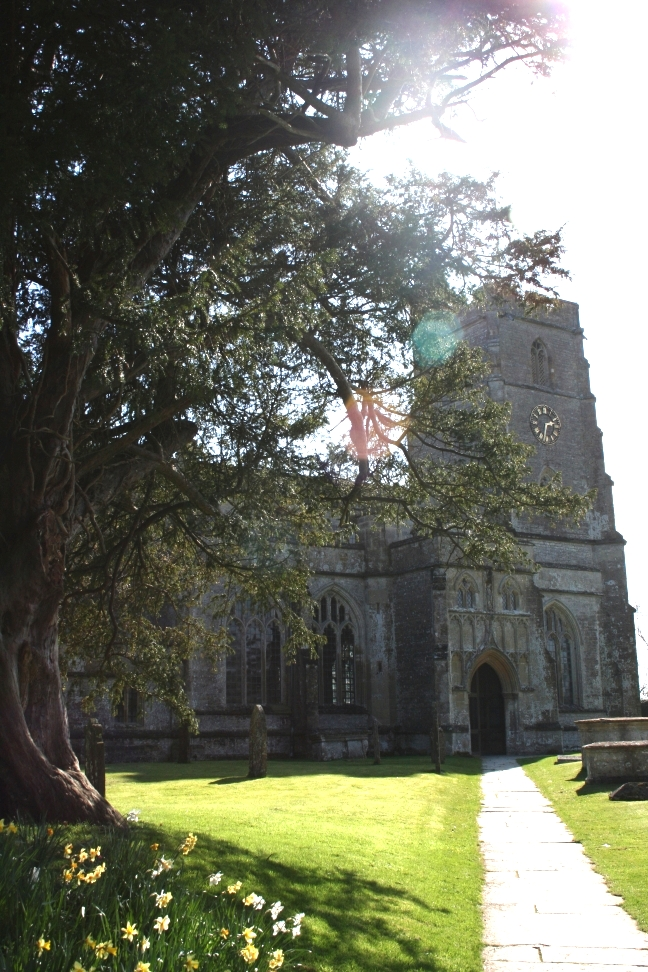
- The church of St. Michael the Archangel at North Cadbury

- Location within Somerset
- Population: 950 (2011)
- OS grid reference: ST635275
- Civil parish: North Cadbury
- Unitary authority: Somerset
- Ceremonial county: Somerset
- Region: South West
- Country: England
- Sovereign state: United Kingdom
- Post town: Yeovil
- Postcode district: BA22
- Police: Avon and Somerset
- Fire: Devon and Somerset
- Ambulance: South Western
- UK Parliament: Glastonbury and Somerton

North Cadbury is a village and civil parish 5 miles (8 km) west of Wincanton, by the River Cam, in Somerset, England. It shares its parish council with nearby Yarlington and its civil parish includes the village of Galhampton, which got its name from the settlement of the rent-paying peasants, and the hamlet of Woolston. In 2021 the parish had a population of 1,009, up from 950 in 2011.

== History ==
The name Cadbury means Cada's fort and refers to Cadbury Castle.

The parish was part of the hundred of Catsash.

=== Feudal barony of North Cadbury ===
In the Domesday Book of 1086 the manor is recorded as held as part of the extensive fiefdom of Turstin FitzRolf, the supposed standard-bearer to William the Conqueror at the Battle of Hastings in 1066. The lands held by Turstin were subsequently proved to have been held under the feudal tenure per baroniam, making the holder a feudal baron. The caput of this barony is stated by Professor Ivor Sanders (1960) to have been North Cadbury, although Turstin's central area of operation seems to have been around Caerleon Castle on the English border with Glamorgan, South Wales.

Turstin seems to have been banished in about 1088, possibly having opposed King William II of England in his struggle for the English crown with his elder brother Robert Curthose, Duke of Normandy. The fiefdom then passed to Wynebald de Ballon, newly arrived with his brother Hamelin de Ballon from Maine, France. Wynebald was a close associate of King William Rufus, and probably received Turstin's fiefdom as a reward for services unknown. Wynebald's centre of operation was at Caerleon Castle, on the River Usk, higher up which was founder Abergavenny Castle by his brother Hamelin. Even further up the river Usk was situated the caput of the great Marcher Lordship of Bernard de Newmarch at Brecon. Wynebald de Ballon's 2 sons died without issue and his heir to the barony became his daughter Mabilia, the wife of a certain "Henry de Newmarch". No evidence has survived as to the ancestry of Henry de Newmarch, but circumstantial evidence suggests that he was descended from Bernard de Newmarch, Marcher Lord of Brecon, by a first marriage. Bernard's sole heiress was certainly his only daughter by his last marriage to Sibila. Bernard is said to have had children by a first marriage, as mention of them is made in a charter to the monks of Brecon, in which he speaks of sons and daughters, especially devising the lands of Costinio for the welfare of the soul of his son Philip.

The barony of Wynebald, which can at this stage in its history be termed the "barony of North Cadbury", descended into the family of his son-in-law Henry de Newmarch (d.1198). Henry had 2 sons, Henry (or possibly William) the eldest who died without issue in 1204, and James (d.1216) who according to Wiffen (1883) married Maud, later the wife of Otto FitzWilliam. James had no son but left 2 co-heiresses, Isabel and Hawise, who being heirs of a tenant-in-chief became wards of the king. The king (either King John just before his death in 1216, or more likely the council of his infant son King Henry III (1216–1272)) granted the wardship, which included the marriage also, of Isabel the elder daughter to John Russell (d.1224) of Kingston Russell, Dorset. Russell had been a household knight of Kings Richard I (1189–1199) and of his brother King John (1199–1216) and of the latter's infant son Henry III, the latter whom he also later served as household steward. The wardship of Hawise the younger the king granted to John de Boterel, confirmed to the latter by Henry III in 1218, per the Close Rolls. Russell was by then elderly and already married with a family so he married-off Isabel to his eldest surviving son Ralph Russell, which action raised Ralph to the status of a feudal baron and gave him possession of a moiety of the lands comprising the barony of North Cadbury. John de Boterel was clearly then unmarried and perhaps younger for he exercised his grant by marrying Hawise himself; however he was not to live much longer and following his death without issue Hawise married secondly in about 1230 Nicholas de Moels. The descendants of both daughters retained all or some of the North Cadbury baronial lands they inherited until the 16th century, when the Russell moiety was then held by the Denys family of Siston, Gloucestershire. On the death of Thomas Russell in 1431, the 21-year-old son of Maurice Russell, knight (d.1416) of Dyrham, Gloucestershire, the heirs to the Russell lands became Thomas's elder half-sisters Margaret, whose first husband had been Gilbert Denys, knight (d.1422), upon the issue of which marriage her inheritance had been settled, and Isabel, then wife of Stephen Hatfield, her 4th husband. The de Moels share passed successively by marriage to the Barons Botreaux (1337), (who may by coincidence have been from the same family as Hawise's first husband John de Botrel), Barons Hungerford (1462) and the Barons Hastings in 1468.

== Governance ==
As a civil parish, North Cadbury has a parish council has responsibility for local issues.

The village is in the Somerset unitary district, administered by Somerset Council. For elections to the council, it is in Castle Cary electoral division.

Historically, North Cadbury was in Wincanton Rural District from 1894 to 1974, and then South Somerset from 1974 until Somerset became a unitary district in 2023.

It is part of Glastonbury and Somerton constituency for elections to the House of Commons.

== Geography ==
Approximately 1 kilometre (0.62 mi) west of North Cadbury is Sparkford Wood, an 8.4 hectare (20.7 acre) biological Site of Special Scientific Interest which is a broadleaved semi-natural woodland situated on heavy fertile soils dating from at least the 18th century.

Along with the rest of South West England, North Cadbury has a temperate climate which is generally wetter and milder than the rest of England. The annual mean temperature is about 10 °C (50 °F) with seasonal and diurnal variations, but due to the modifying effect of the sea, the range is less than in most other parts of the United Kingdom. January is the coldest month with mean minimum temperatures between 1 and 2 °C (34 and 36 °F). July and August are the warmest months in the region with mean daily maxima around 21 °C (70 °F). In general, December is the dullest month and June the sunniest. The south west of England enjoys a favoured location, particularly in summer, when the Azores High extends its influence north-eastwards towards the UK.

Cloud often forms inland, especially near hills, and reduces exposure to sunshine. The average annual sunshine totals around 1600 hours. Rainfall tends to be associated with Atlantic depressions or with convection. In summer, convection caused by solar surface heating sometimes forms shower clouds and a large proportion of the annual precipitation falls from showers and thunderstorms at this time of year. Average rainfall is around 800–900 mm (31–35 in). About 8–15 days of snowfall is typical. November to March have the highest mean wind speeds, with June to August having the lightest. The predominant wind direction is from the south west.

== Landmarks ==
Galhampton Manor House dates from 1723 and has been designated by English Heritage as a grade II* listed building. The village is also home to their festival 'Party in the Park', which happens every July and is attended by 1,200 people each year.

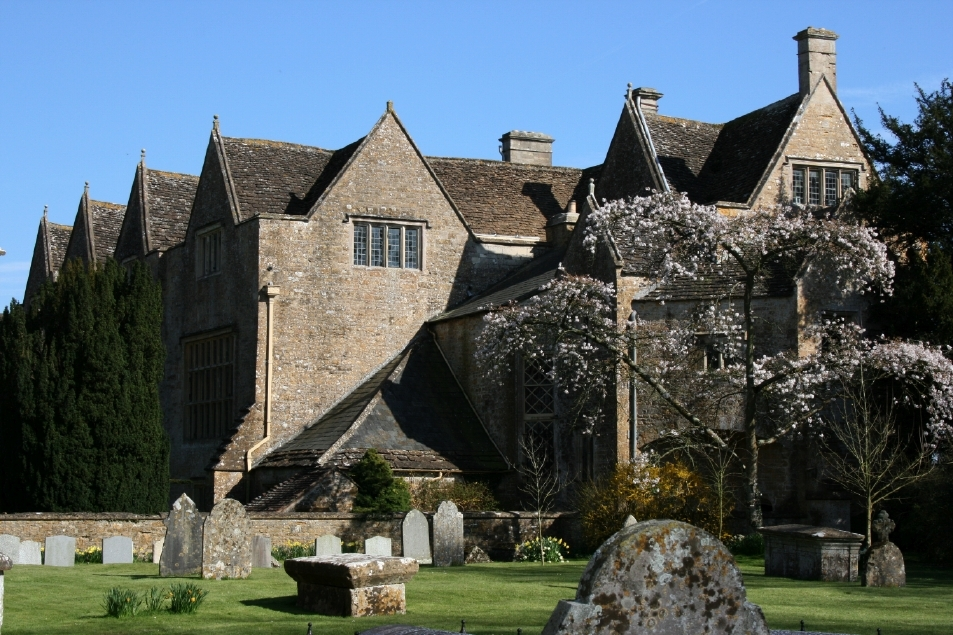
North Cadbury Court from the churchyard

North Cadbury Court is a country house built around 1580–1610, by Sir Francis Hastings, who inherited the estate from his father in 1544. After his wife died in 1596 Hastings sold the court with the rest of the manor to Matthew Ewens. In 1910 the court was bought by Sir Archibald Langman.

== Church of St Michael ==
The Church of St. Michael the Archangel in North Cadbury dates mostly from 1417, however the tower is from a few years earlier. It has been designated by English Heritage as a grade I listed building.

== Sources ==
- Sanders, I. J. English Baronies, A Study of their Origin & Descent 1086-1327, Oxford, 1960, p. 68, "North Cadbury"
- Newmarch, George Frederick & Newmarch, Charles H., The Newmarch Pedigree, Verified by Public Records, Authentic Manuscripts and General and Local Histories, Cirencester, 1868, p. 2. (lacks sources for assertions made)
- Wiffen, J. H. Historical Memoirs of the House of Russell from the Time of the Norman Conquest, 1883. vol.1 (Confounds the family of Russell of KR with Russell ancestors of Dukes of Bedford, but otherwise contains excellent biographical research)
