= The Doughnut =

Headquarters of the British GCHQ

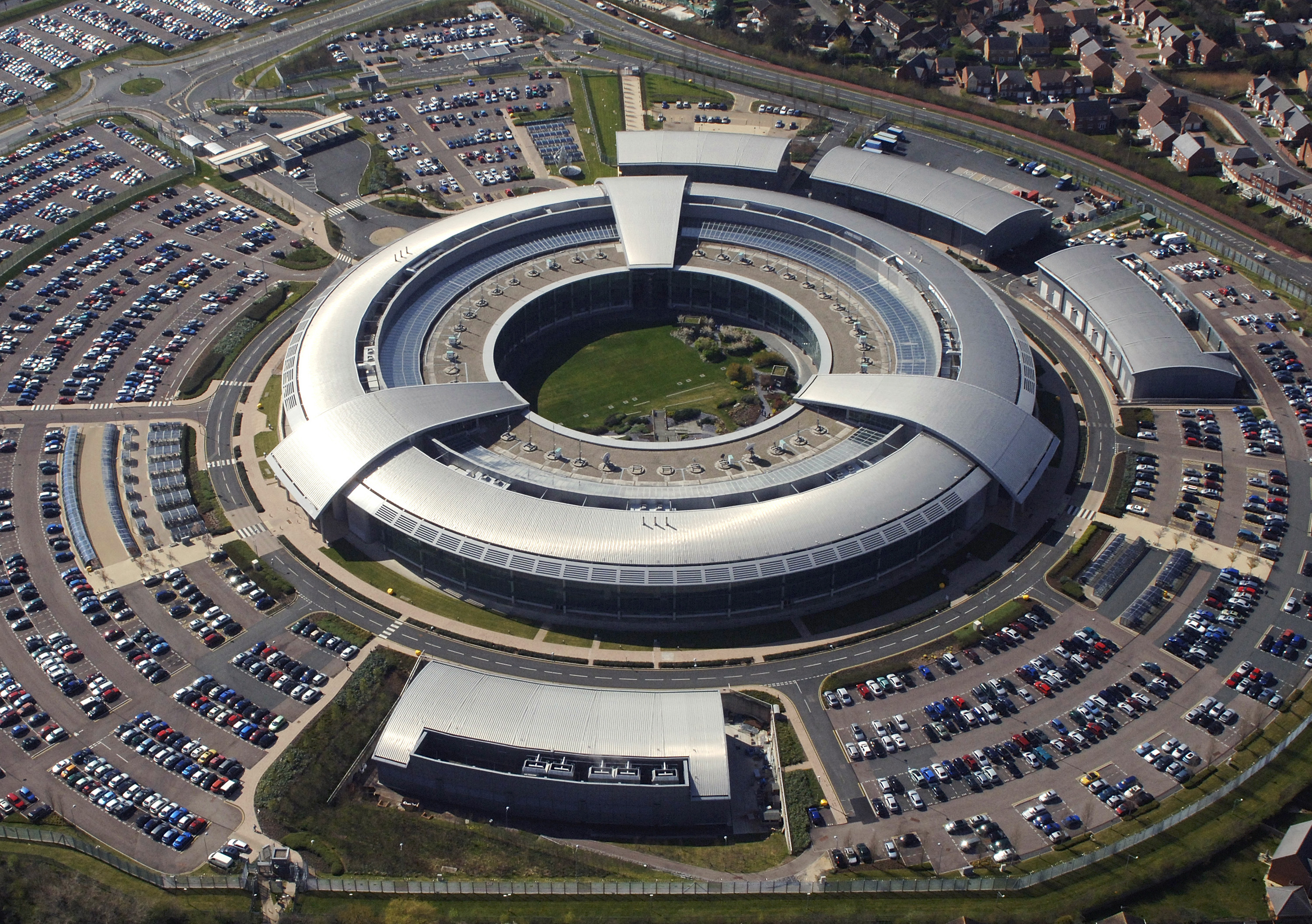
- An aerial view of the Doughnut in 2004

General information
- Status: Completed
- Type: Departmental headquarters
- Architectural style: Structural expressionism
- Location: Hubble Road, Benhall, Cheltenham, Gloucestershire GL51 0EX, England
- Coordinates: 51°53′58.4″N 02°07′27.7″W
- Current tenants: GCHQ
- Construction started: 2000; 26 years ago
- Completed: 2003; 23 years ago
- Opened: 2003; 23 years ago
- Inaugurated: 2004; 22 years ago
- Cost: £337 million (build cost) £1.2 billion (overall PFI contract)
- Owner: Integrated Accommodation Services / HM Government

Height
- Height: 21 metres (70 feet)

Dimensions
- Diameter: 200 metres (660 feet)

Technical details
- Material: Steel, concrete, glass, and Cotswold stone
- Floor count: Four
- Grounds: 71 hectares (176 acres)

Design and construction
- Architect: Chris Johnson
- Architecture firm: Gensler
- Structural engineer: TPS Consult
- Services engineer: Crown House Engineering
- Civil engineer: Scott Wilson Kirkpatrick
- Main contractor: Carillion
- Known for: Headquarters of the UK Government Communications

Other information
- Parking: Secure on-site

Website
- www.GCHQ.gov.uk

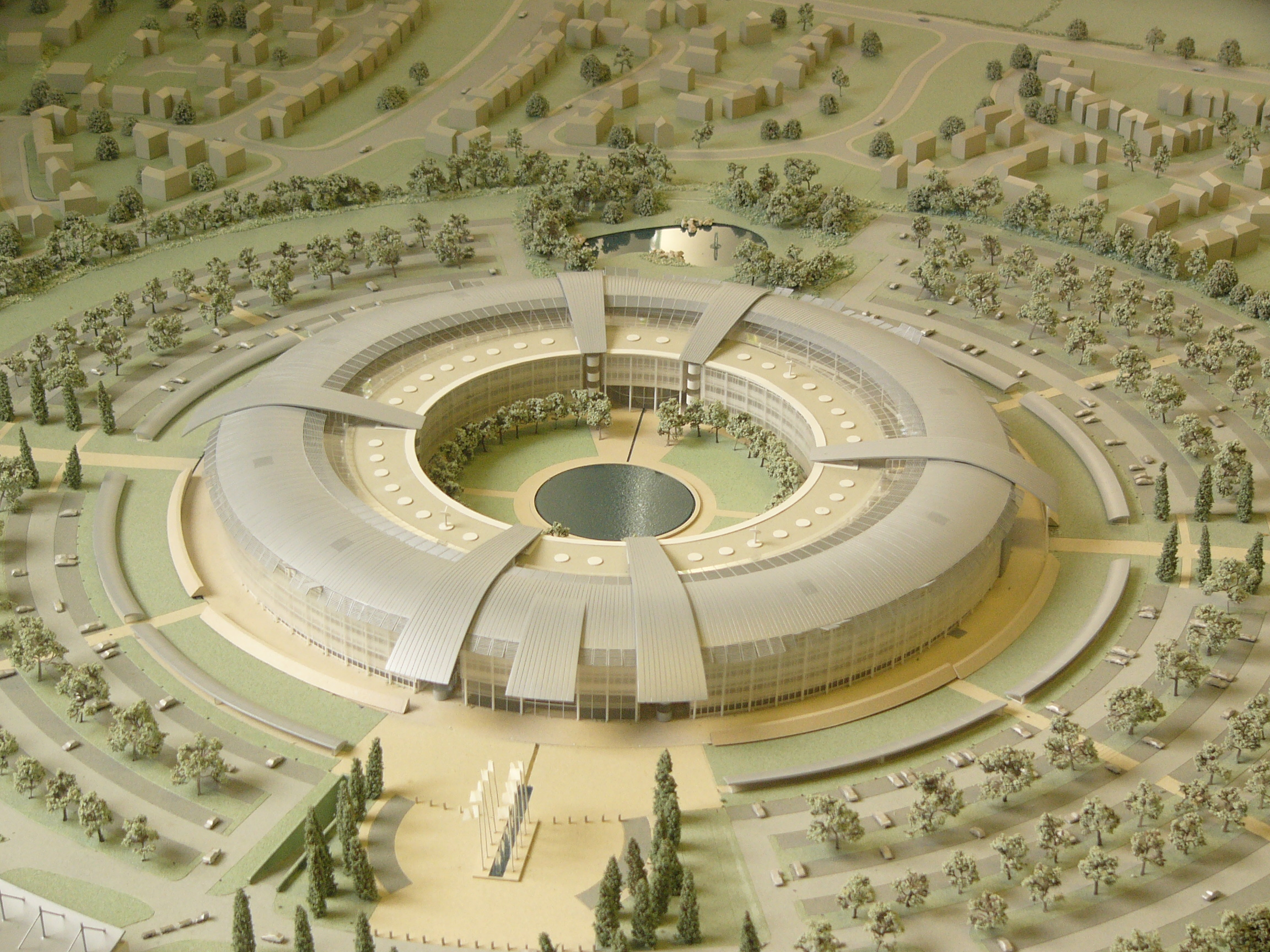
Original scale model of the Doughnut, the proposed new headquarters building for GCHQ.

The Doughnut is the nickname given (due to its resemblance to a doughnut) to the headquarters of the Government Communications Headquarters (GCHQ), a British cryptography and intelligence agency. It is located on a 71 hectares (176 acres) site in Benhall, in the suburbs of Cheltenham, Gloucestershire, in South West England. The Doughnut accommodates 5,500 employees; GCHQ is the largest single employer in Gloucestershire. Built to modernise and consolidate GCHQ's multiple buildings in Cheltenham, the Doughnut was completed in 2003, with GCHQ staff moving in the same year, and fully moved into the building in 2004. The Doughnut was too small for the number of staff at its completion, and a second building in a secret and undisclosed location in the 'Gloucestershire area' now also accommodates staff from GCHQ. The Doughnut is surrounded by car and bicycle parking in concentric rings, and is well protected by security fencing, guards, and CCTV systems.

The construction of the building was financed by a private finance initiative, and construction costs were greatly increased after difficulties in transferring computer infrastructure to the building. The building is modern in design, and built primarily from steel, aluminium, and stone. GCHQ management aspired for the building to be as well known internationally as the Pentagon.

== Background ==
The construction of the Doughnut in 2003 consolidated the operations previously spread across two sites into a single location, replacing more than 50 buildings in the process. The last staff from the nearby GCHQ site at Oakley were transferred to the Doughnut in late 2011.

The design of the Doughnut reflects GCHQ's intended new mode of work after the end of the Cold War, with its design facilitating talking among staff, and between them and the Director of GCHQ and his subordinates. It was estimated that anyone in the building could reach any other worker within five minutes. The director of GCHQ has no office; in 2014 director Iain Lobban described his desk as being located "within the shouting distance of lawyers".

At a cost of £330 million, the construction of the Doughnut was funded by a private finance initiative (PFI) put forward by a collective that included the British facilities management and construction company Carillion (now defunct), the Danish security company Group 4 / Falck (now G4S), and the British telecommunications company BT Group. The creation of the Doughnut was the largest PFI project to date for the British government. The building was designed by the British architect Chris Johnson for the American architectural firm Gensler, and built by Carillion.

In 2004, Edward Leigh, the chairman of the Commons Public Accounts Committee, criticised the increasing cost of GCHQ's move to the Doughnut. Leigh said that "It was astonishing GCHQ did not realise the extent of what would be involved much sooner". Leigh had said in 2003 that GCHQ's original estimate for the cost of the move was "staggeringly inaccurate".

For security reasons, GCHQ moved its own computers and technical infrastructure to the Doughnut, which caused the cost of its move to increase from £41 million to £450 million over two years. The moves of MI5 and the Secret Intelligence Service (SIS) to new buildings had also cost more than three times their original estimates due to issues with transferring computers. HM Treasury paid £216 million toward a newly agreed budget of £308 million, having initially refused to finance the original high figure. The final cost of GCHQ's move to their new headquarters was more than seven times the original estimate.

The complexity of the computer network at GCHQ was responsible for the increase in costs. Issues with the network were found while preparing computers for the 'Millennium bug'. Simply shutting down each computer individually before restarting them in the Doughnut would have left GCHQ unable to complete key intelligence work for two years, while moving their electronics according to the original schedule without "unacceptable damage" to intelligence gathering would cost £450 million. In a review of GCHQ's move in 2003, the National Audit Office (NAO) said government ministers might never have approved the consolidation of facilities had the final cost been known.

== Design ==
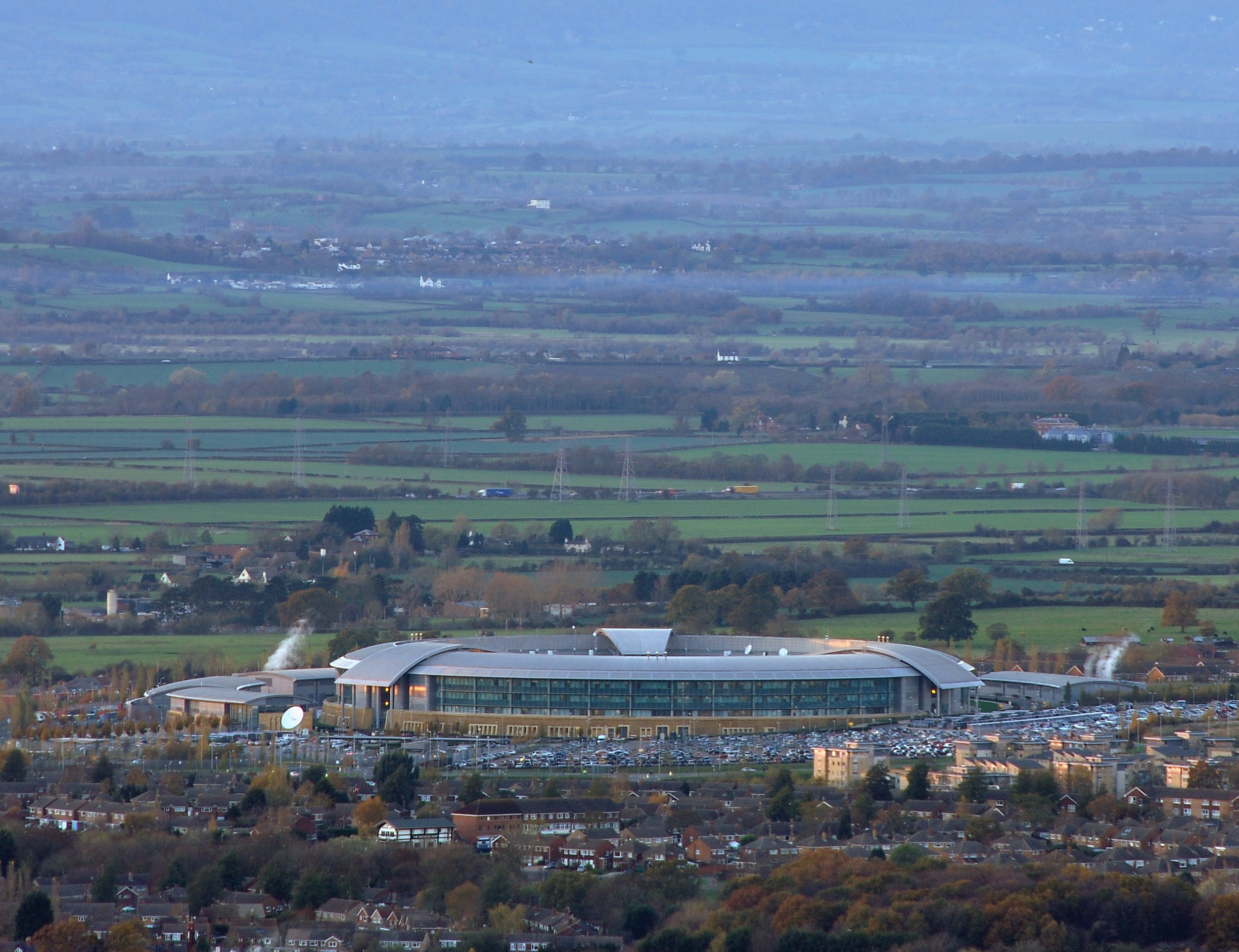
The Doughnut from Leckhampton Hill, 2010

The Doughnut is divided into three separate four-storey structures, identical in design, and connected at the top and bottom. With a total floor area of 140,000 square metres (1,500,000 square feet), the building contains two circular blocks, internally divided by a 'street' covered in glass. Construction materials were primarily steel, aluminium, and stone, particularly granite and local limestone from the Cotswolds; designers incorporated recycled materials in the steelwork and the construction of desks. The design of the Doughnut was subsequently nominated for an award to "highlight improvements to the built and landscaped environment" given by Cheltenham's Civic Society.

A circular walkway named The Street runs throughout the building. An open-air garden courtyard lies in the middle of the Doughnut; this garden is large enough to contain the Royal Albert Hall. The courtyard has a memorial to GCHQ staff who have been killed on active service; some five staff died in the War in Afghanistan. Below the garden are banks of supercomputers. The Doughnut is 21 metres (70 feet) high and 180 metres (600 feet) in diameter. Individual spaces in the Doughnut include the GCHQ archive holding 16 million historical artefacts, and the 24/7 operations centre where people working in "small 12-hour shifts monitor GCHQ systems and news bulletins." The 'Action On' programme enables the 24/7 staff to act "quickly and freely" to supply information to British Armed Forces to help their operations. The Doughnut's internet operations centre (INOC), is where "the best technical capabilities [are matched] with the most urgent operational requirements" according to Charles Moore who visited the Doughnut in 2014 for The Daily Telegraph.

The structure of the Doughnut is designed to minimise any potential effect of a fire or a terrorist attack on the building; it also includes independent power generators which can supply power to the facilities in an emergency. About 1,850 miles (3,000 kilometres) of fibre optics were installed in the Doughnut by British Telecom, and about 6,000 miles (10,000 kilometres) of electrical wiring were used in the building.

The Doughnut is surrounded by car and bicycle parking in concentric rings, guarded by a two-metre metal fence and half a dozen vehicle checkpoints. The Doughnut is served by an underground road.

Facilities available to staff at the Doughnut include a 600-seat restaurant, cafes, shops, a gymnasium, and a prayer or quiet room. Exhibits from the history of GCHQ are displayed throughout the building, including the radios used by the Portland spy ring.

== History ==
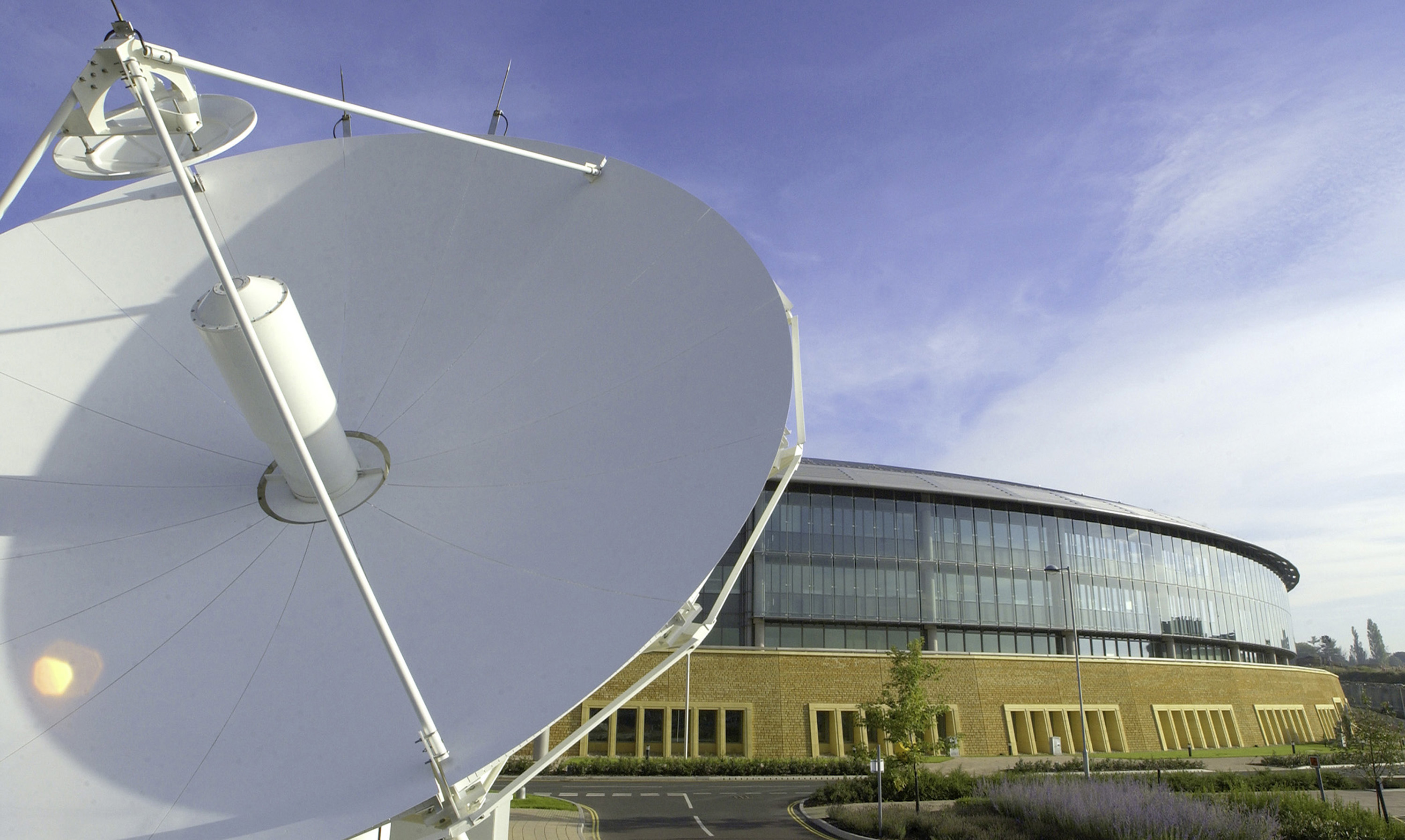
Movable satellite receiver dish in front of the GCHQ Doughnut

The Doughnut was officially opened in 2004 by Queen Elizabeth II, accompanied by the Duke of Edinburgh. In 2008, the then Labour Prime Minister of the United Kingdom, Gordon Brown, visited the Doughnut and praised the staff working there in a speech. The Doughnut has been visited three times by the then Charles, Prince of Wales since its opening. Charles was accompanied by Camilla, Duchess of Cornwall in 2011, on his second visit to the Doughnut.

The Doughnut was already too small for the number of GCHQ staff at its completion, as a vast expansion in the number of employees had occurred as a consequence of the September 11 attacks in 2001. The staff numbered almost 6,500 by 2008. The addition of a two-storey office block and a three-storey car park to the Doughnut was proposed in 2008, but eventually suspended in 2011. The new buildings were intended to facilitate the arrival of 800 staff from GCHQ's former site at Oakley. Though it was initially felt that the Doughnut would be adequate for the new staff, 600 contractors working on technical projects for GCHQ were eventually relocated to a secret undisclosed building in the 'Gloucestershire area'. The parking of cars by GCHQ staff on residential roads has caused 'annoyance' among local residents in Benhall. It was believed that the arrival of new staff may have further affected local parking, but GCHQ stated the presence of the new employees would have been offset by redundancies.

On 1 June 2007, the building and its grounds were designated as a protected site for the purposes of Section 128 of the Serious Organised Crime and Police Act 2005. The effect of the act was to make it a specific criminal offence for a person to trespass into the site.

Access to the Doughnut is rarely granted to representatives from the media, but it was visited for the March 2010 BBC Radio 4 documentary GCHQ: Cracking the Code, by Charles Moore for an interview with GCHQ director Iain Lobban for The Daily Telegraph in October 2014, and by historian and writer Ben Macintyre who visited the Doughnut for a series of articles for The Times in October 2015 in anticipation of the draft Investigatory Powers Bill.

=== Charitable efforts ===
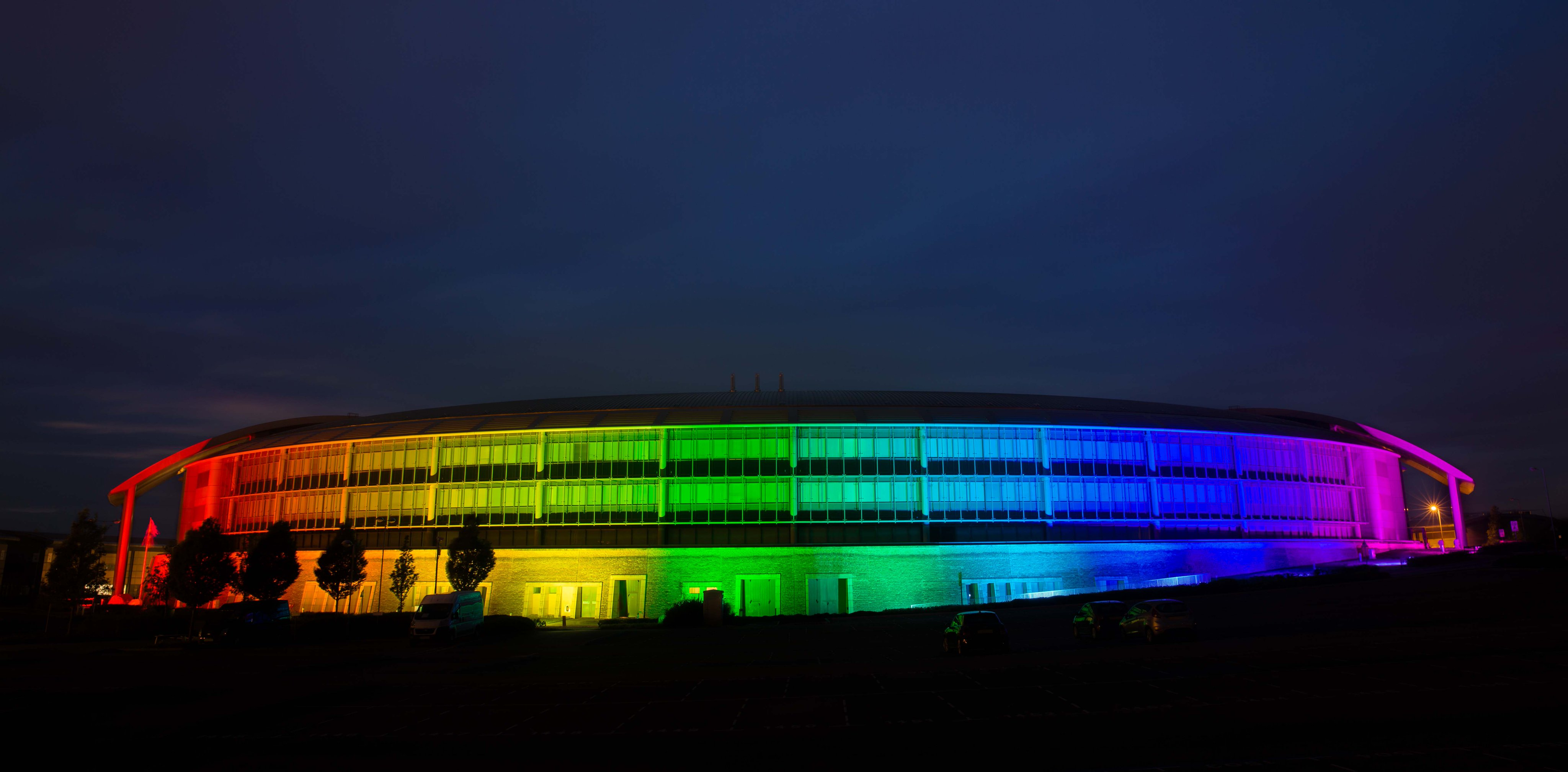
GCHQ illuminated in rainbow spectrum of colours to mark the International Day Against Homophobia, Transphobia and Biphobia in 2015

Originally an annual event, a Community Day is held at the Doughnut to highlight the charitable and volunteer work by GCHQ staff in the local Cheltenham community. More recent Community Day events are held approximately every 18 months.

In October 2014, 1,308 GCHQ staff formed a giant red poppy in the Doughnut's central courtyard to mark the start of the Royal British Legion's (RBL) Poppy Appeal. The poppy was 38 metres (125 feet) in size with a 28 metres (92 feet) long stalk. The staff wore red rain ponchos, with the black centre of the poppy formed by the uniforms of Royal Navy personnel.

In 2015, the Doughnut was illuminated with yellow light to mark GCHQ staff's support for The Guide Dogs for the Blind Association, and by a rainbow spectrum of colours to mark the International Day Against Homophobia, Transphobia and Biphobia. In early 2018, the Doughnut among others was again lit up in rainbow colours in support of LGBTQ causes.

== See also ==
The three other headquarters of British intelligence agencies;

- The SIS Building – headquarters of the Secret Intelligence Service (SIS), known as MI6
- Thames House – headquarters of the Security Service, known as MI5
- Northwood Headquarters and Ministry of Defence Main Building – headquarters of the British Armed Forces and the Defence Intelligence (DI)
