= Aust =

Village in Gloucestershire, England

Coordinates: 51.599°N 2.618°W

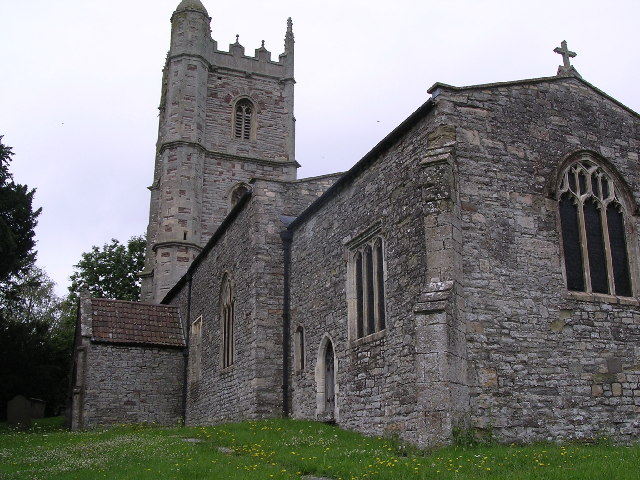
- Aust Church

- Location within Gloucestershire
- Population: 532 (2011)
- Civil parish: Aust
- District: South Gloucestershire
- Shire county: Gloucestershire
- Region: South West
- Country: England
- Sovereign state: United Kingdom
- Post town: Bristol
- Postcode district: BS35
- Police: Avon and Somerset
- Fire: Avon
- Ambulance: South Western
- UK Parliament: Thornbury and Yate

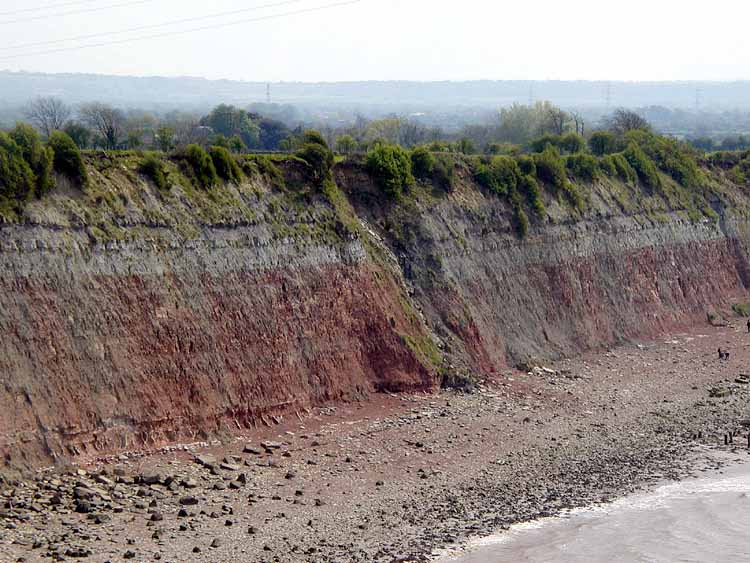
Aust Cliff. The scale is indicated by the two people on the beach at the right of the image.

Aust is a small village in South Gloucestershire, England, about 10 miles (16 km) north of Bristol and about 28 miles (45 km) south west of Gloucester. It is located on the eastern side of the Severn estuary, close to the eastern end of the Severn Bridge which carries the M48 motorway. The village has a chapel, a church and a public house. There is a large area of farmland on the river bank, which is sometimes flooded due to the high tidal range of the Severn. Aust Cliff, above the Severn, is located about 0.5 miles (0.80 km) from the village. The civil parish of Aust includes the villages of Elberton and Littleton-upon-Severn.

== History ==
=== Overview ===
Aust, on the River Severn, was at one end of an ancient Roman road that led to Cirencester. Its name, Aust, may be one of the very few English place-names to be derived from the Latin Augusta. (Note: An alternate theory is that it may be named after St Augustine's Oak, but that theory is discounted as a "weakened dative case", due to location and dates of name use.)

"Augustin endeavoured to persuade the Welsh clergy to join him in preaching the Gospel to the Teutonic invaders, and held a meeting with them at or near Aust, on the Severn. But they refused to acknowledge his authority, or even to hold communion with him, and would not give up their peculiar usages with respect to the date of Easter and the administration of Baptism" ("The English Church in the Middle Ages" by William Hunt)

The name of Aust is recorded in 793 or 794 as Austan (terram aet Austan v manentes) when it was returned to the Church of Worcester after having been taken by King Offa's earl, Bynna. In the Domesday Book, Aust Cliff was recorded as Austreclive, "clive" being a Middle English spelling of cliff. and the estate was held by Turstin FitzRolf in 1066. In 1368 the area was called Augst, "the short unmistakable form of Augusta.

Historically Aust was a village and manor in the parish of Henbury.

=== Aust church ===
It was reported as a part of the church of Worcester's Westbury on Trym estate in the Domesday book. (Note: Baddeley stated that Æthelstan granted land for a church to the Worcester Cathedral in 929. Abrams stated that there was a forged diploma for the donation of land by Æthelstan for a fishery.) About 1100 Winebaud de Ballon gave the church to the Abbey of St Vincent, Le Mans. In the 14th century, the chapel at Aust was part of the Church of Westbury.

The Lollard theologian John Wycliffe (died 1384) is by tradition said to have been prebend of Aust and to have preached there, yet Baker (1901) was unable to find any record of such an appointment in the diocesan registers at Worcester, which see held Aust for many centuries.

The existing church is dedicated to St John, and is mostly built in the Perpendicular Gothic style. The timber roofs and octagonal stone font date from the 15th century, and the western church tower, with an embattled parapet, was probably rebuilt in the Tudor period. The church contains several 18th-century marble memorial tablets, the earliest dated 1704 to Sir Samuel Astry. The whole church was restored in 1866 by the firm of Pope & Bindon.

=== Aust manor ===
The estate at Aust was held from the Bishop of Worcester as part of the extensive feudal barony of Turstin FitzRolf who had acted as standard-bearer to William the Conqueror at the Battle of Hastings in 1066. FitzRolf's properties in Gloucestershire were held in capite, including Aust, reverted to the Crown and then were granted to Wynebald de Ballon from Maine. Wynebald had a holding at Caerleon on the River Usk near the manor of his brother Hamelin de Ballon of Abergavenny. Both brothers made significant donations to the Abbey of St Vincent at Le Mans, including Wynebald's donation of the church of Aust.

A daughter of de Ballon married a man named de Newmarch, their son Henry held the estate of Aust in 1166. John, his son and heir, next held Aust. One of John's daughters and co-heiress married Ralf Russell of Kingston Russell, who then held the estate.

It passed in moiety through generations of the Russell and then Dennis families, through Margret Russell who married Sir Gilbert Denys (died 1422) to her grandson Walt Dennis. The moiety was purchased by the Astry family, The other moiety of Aust was held by Roger de Acton and was eventually sold to the Astry family. Reportedly it came into the Astry family in 1652. It was passed through several generations and was sold several times. In 1801, it was owned by Sacheverell Sitwell of Derbyshire.

== Services and facilities ==
The village is within a short walking distance of 24hr shops at nearby Severn View services (originally known as Aust Services), a small motorway service area operated by Moto on the M48 motorway near the Severn Bridge.The main building is a two-storey timber and stone construction. The service area was listed as the last-known (February 1995) whereabouts of former Manic Street Preachers band member Richey Edwards, officially presumed deceased since 2008.

The Severn Bridge, a suspension bridge opened as part of the M4 motorway (later renamed the M48) in 1966, crosses the Severn estuary between Aust and Beachley. It was the first Severn road crossing south of Gloucester, and took five years to construct at a cost of £8 million. It replaced the Aust Ferry.

The Aust Ferry passage across the Severn estuary between Aust and Beachley – later known as the Old Passage – was used from antiquity. In the 12th century, responsibility was granted to the monks of Tintern Abbey, and it continued to operate in subsequent centuries. From 1827, a regular steamboat ferry service was established, but it lost much of its trade when a rival service was set up downstream at New Passage in 1863, and when the Severn rail tunnel was opened in 1886. The growth of road traffic led to the re-establishment of a ferry between Aust and Beachley in 1926, carrying no more than 17 vehicles each time. Bob Dylan was photographed in 1966 standing outside the ferry ticket office, with the almost-completed Severn Bridge behind; the photo was used to publicise Martin Scorsese's film No Direction Home. The ferry service closed when the Severn Bridge was opened in September 1966.

== See also ==
- Aust Cliff SSSI
