= Château de Ballon =

Castle in Sarthe, Pays de la Loire, France

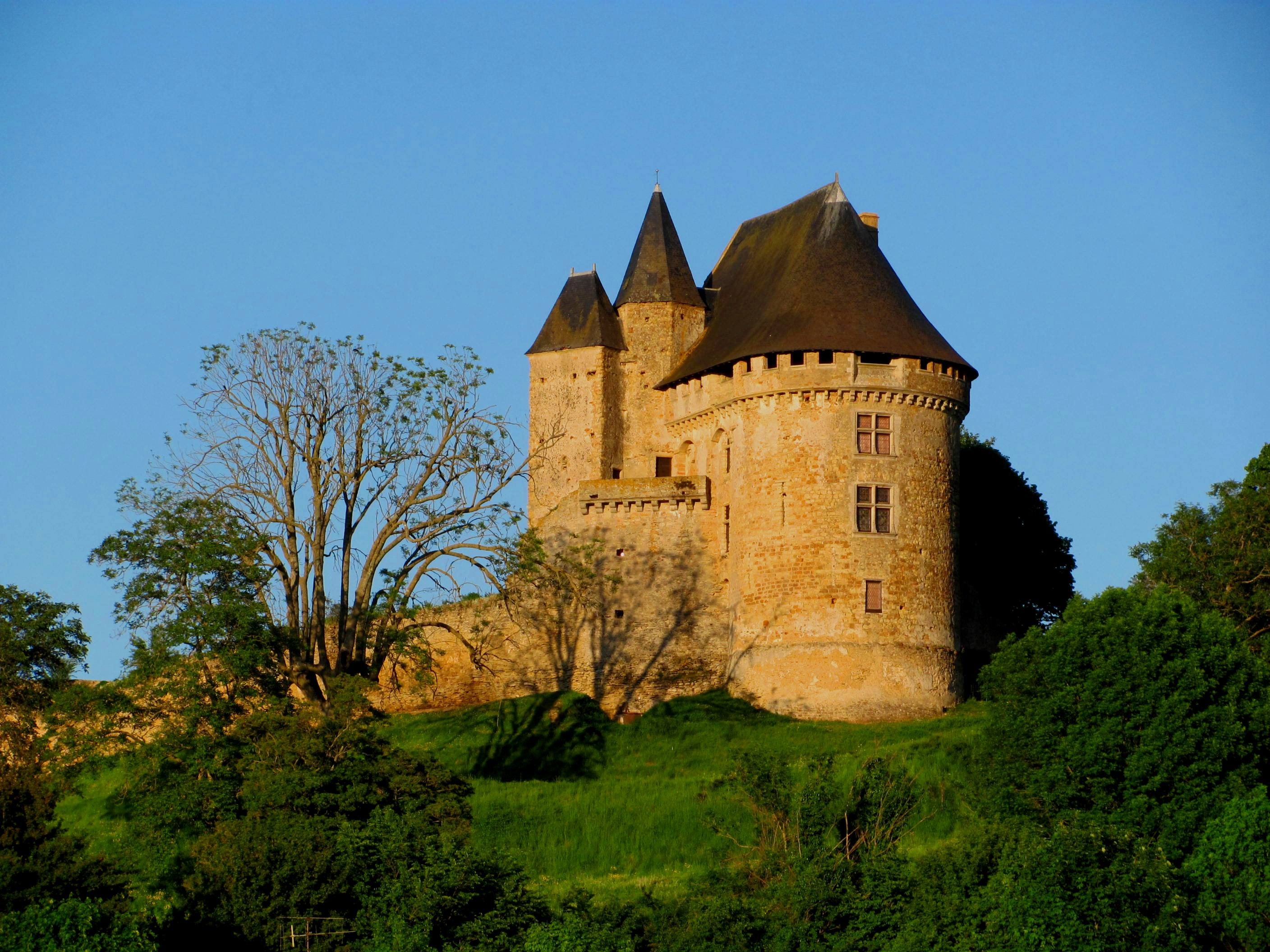
- Château de Ballon in 2010
- Interactive map of the Château de Ballon area

General information
- Location: France
- Coordinates: 48°10′45.0732″N 0°13′59.0268″E

The Château de Ballon is a historic castle in Ballon, Sarthe, Pays de la Loire, France.

== History ==
The castle was built in the 15th and 16th centuries.

== Architectural significance ==
It has been listed as an official monument since 1923.

== See also ==
- Wynebald de Ballon
- Hamelin de Ballon
