= Saint-Mars-sous-Ballon =

- Part of Ballon-Saint-Mars
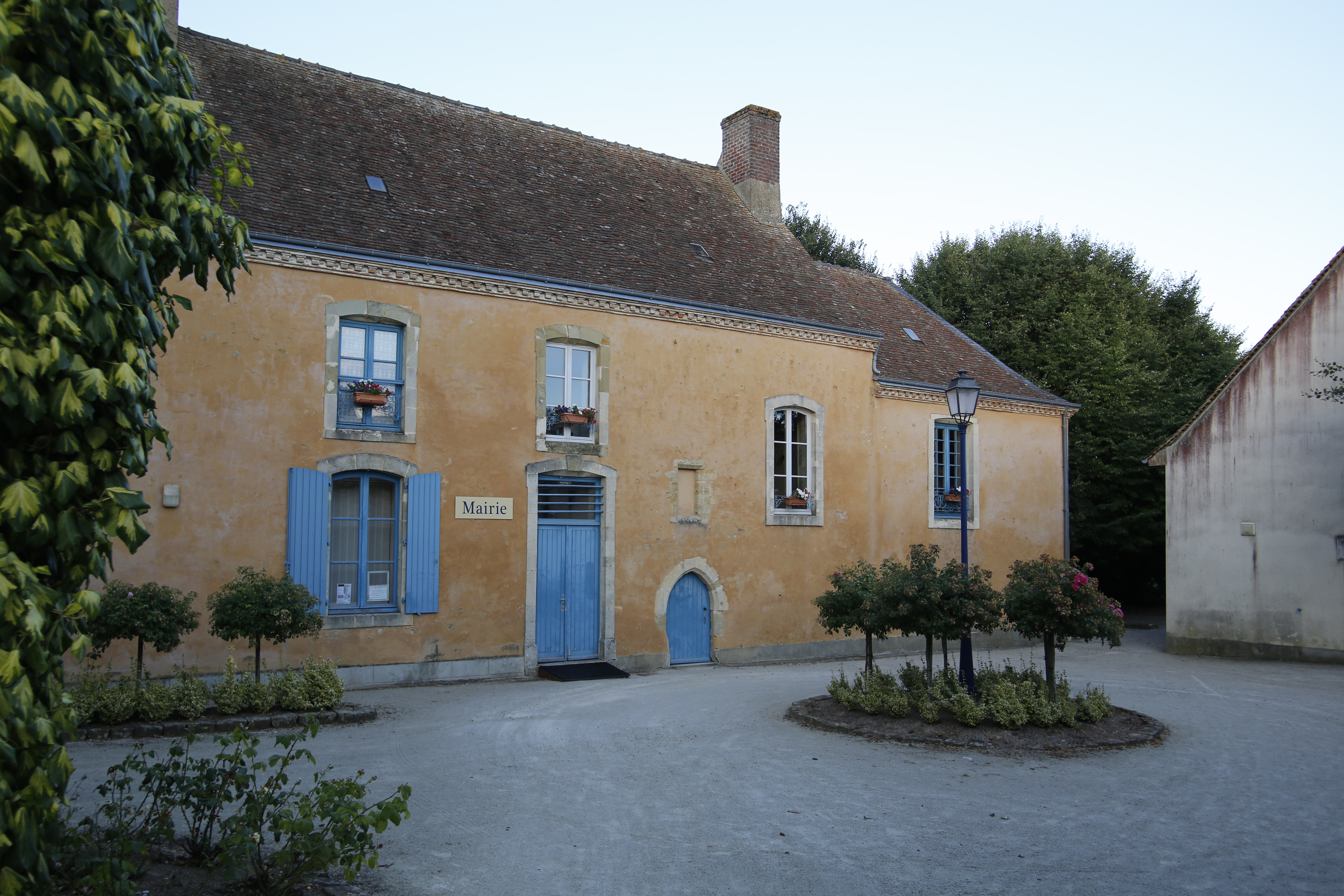
- Saint-Mars-sous-Ballon Town hall
- Location of Saint-Mars-sous-Ballon
- Location within France Location within Pays de la Loire
- Coordinates: 48°10′24″N 0°14′47″E
- Country: France
- Region: Pays de la Loire
- Department: Sarthe
- Arrondissement: Le Mans
- Canton: Bonnétable
- Commune: Ballon-Saint-Mars
- Area^{1}: 18.2 km^{2} (7.0 sq mi)
- Highest elevation: 130 m (430 ft)
- Lowest elevation: 54 m (177 ft)
- Population (2018): 871
  - Density: 47.9/km^{2} (124/sq mi)
- Time zone: UTC+01:00 (CET)
  - Summer (DST): UTC+02:00 (CEST)
- Postal code: 72290
- ^{1} French Land Register data, which excludes lakes, ponds, glaciers > 1 km^{2} (0.386 sq mi or 247 acres) and river estuaries.

Saint-Mars-sous-Ballon (French pronunciation: [sɛ̃ maʁ su balɔ̃], literally Saint-Mars under Ballon) is a former commune in the Sarthe department in the region of Pays de la Loire in north-western France. On 1 January 2016, it was merged into the new commune of Ballon-Saint-Mars. Its population was 871 in 2018.

== See also ==
- Communes of the Sarthe department
