= Iain Lobban =

Sir Iain Robert Lobban KCMG CB (born 1960) is a former British civil servant. He was the Director of the Government Communications Headquarters (GCHQ), the British signals intelligence agency, from 2008 to 2014.

== Education and career ==
Born in Nigeria, Lobban graduated from the University of Leeds with a Bachelor of Arts in languages. He joined GCHQ in 1983 and undertook a variety of roles before joining the GCHQ Board in 2001. He was a participant of the Cabinet Office's Top Management Programme that year. He has also completed the Higher Command and Staff Course at the Ministry of Defence's staff college at Shrivenham. Whilst on the Board he was responsible for moving the operations of GCHQ into its new base at The Doughnut at Benhall, Gloucestershire. Before being appointed Director, Lobban was Director-General (Operations); having taken up this post in early 2004. He became the Director of GCHQ in July 2008, succeeding Sir David Pepper.

Lobban spoke of his regret over the treatment of cryptographer Alan Turing in October 2012. Turing, who committed suicide after being convicted of homosexuality, was described by Lobban as a "national asset" and said that more people like Turing were needed to face contemporary information security threats.

In November 2013 in the wake of the global surveillance disclosures by the former American National Security Agency (NSA) contractor Edward Snowden, Lobban and the other heads of the British intelligence agencies, Andrew Parker of MI5, and John Sawers of MI6 appeared before the Joint Intelligence Committee. During his questioning by the committee Lobban said that "I do not look at the surrounding hay" referring to the metadata collected by GCHQ. Lobban said that the disclosures had been discussed by terrorist groups in the Middle East and Afghanistan. The effect of Snowden's revelations would make GCHQ's task "...far, far harder in the future". Snowden's extensive disclosures revealed details of GCHQ's recent activities and capabilities, including the Tempora electronic surveillance program, GCHQ's tapping of international fiber-optic communications, and the NSA's payment to GCHQ over £100 Million between 2009 and 2012.

It was announced in January 2014 that Lobban would stand down as GCHQ director before the end of the year. Lobban's American equivalents, the head of the National Security Agency, General Keith B. Alexander, and his deputy, John C. Inglis, also stood down from their posts in 2014. He formally retired on 24 October 2014.

After retiring from the government, Lobban went on to advise the Australian government before joining the advisory board of private security firm the Holdingham Group, which is now known as Hakluyt & Company.

Lobban was appointed Companion of the Order of the Bath (CB) in the 2006 New Year Honours for services to national security and Knight Commander of the Order of St Michael and St George (KCMG) in the 2013 New Year Honours for services to national security.

Lobban is a supporter of Everton F. C., and counts cricket, photography, travel and bird watching among his hobbies.

Government offices
Preceded by Sir David Pepper	Director of GCHQ; 2008–2014	Succeeded by Robert Hannigan
