= Ampney St Mary =

Village in Gloucestershire, England

Coordinates: 51.71°N 01.88°W

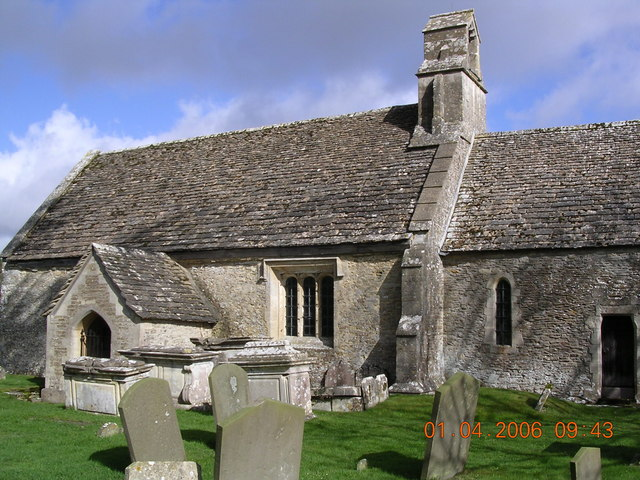
- The church

- Location within Gloucestershire
- Population: 218
- OS grid reference: SP0802
- Shire county: Gloucestershire
- Region: South West
- Country: England
- Sovereign state: United Kingdom
- Post town: Cirencester
- Postcode district: GL7
- Police: Gloucestershire
- Fire: Gloucestershire
- Ambulance: South Western
- UK Parliament: South Cotswolds

Ampney St Mary is a small village and civil parish in the Cotswolds, part of the Cotswold District of Gloucestershire, England. According to the 2001 census the parish had a population of 54, increasing to 218 at the 2011 census.

Ampney was listed in the Domesday Book of 1086.

The Ampney Brook flows near the village, which is near to Ampney Crucis and Ampney St Peter, and is about four miles east of Cirencester. The village takes its name from the brook and the local church. The village is also locally known as "Ashbrook".

The village has an 18th-century public house, the Red Lion, one of the few public houses left without a bar counter.

The Church of St Mary was built in the 12th and 13th centuries. It is a grade I listed building.
