= Turstin FitzRolf =

Norman knight and lord (d. after 1086)

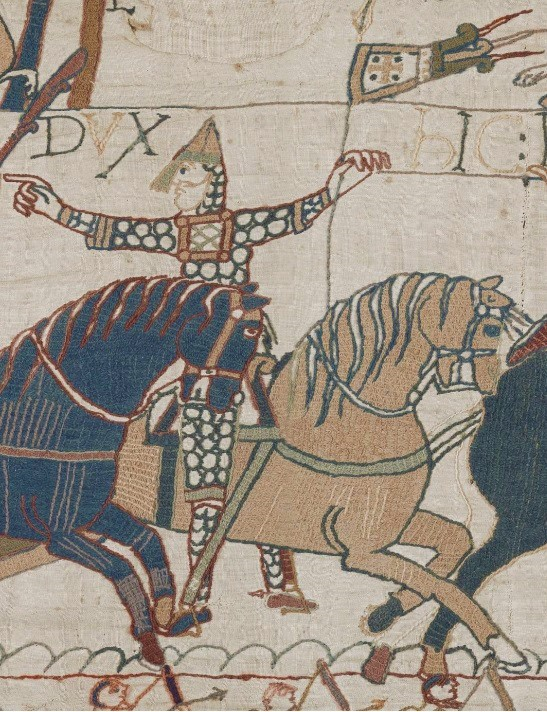
This knight depicted in the Bayeux Tapestry is sometimes stated to depict Turstin FitzRolf, but is in fact more likely to be Eustace II, Count of Boulogne as the knight appears below the marginal legend E[...]TIUS, a Latinised version of Eustace. His finger pointing to Duke William, whose left hand holding a club before the word DUX can be seen on the left side of the frame, seems to depict his urging the Duke to retreat, as the account in William of Poitiers relates of Eustace. The attribution to Turstin FitzRolf might otherwise have been plausible, due to the depicted figure's carrying of a pennon depicting a cross, apparently the Papal Banner. Turstin was described as having carried the "Gonfannon of the Normans" by Orderic Vitalis

Turstin fitz Rolf, also known as Turstin le Blanc and Tustein fitz Rou (Old Norse: Þorsteinn Hrólfsson) played a prominent role in the Norman Conquest of England and is regarded as one of the few proven companions of William the Conqueror at the Battle of Hastings in 1066.

He appears to have originated from Bec-de-Mortagne, Pays de Caux, Normandy,

== Name and origins ==
As the prefix fitz indicates, Turstin was the son of a man called Rolf (> Rouf > Rou in later French), names that are synonymous with their latinized equivalent Rollo, only used for the first Viking count of Rouen Rollo, with the notable exception of Orderic Vitalis that writes Turstinus filius Rollonis about Turstin le Blanc.

The given name Turstin originated in the Old Norse Þórstæinn (Thorstein; "Thor's stone") and is sometimes spelt Tostein, Thurstan, Tostain and similar variants.

Turstin appears to have originated in Bec-de-Mortagne, Pays-de-Caux, Normandy, about five miles south-east of Fécamp, according to the Roman de Rou poem written by Wace (c. 1115 – 1183):

Tustein Fitz-Rou out non,
Al Bec en Caux aveit meison
([Modern French]: "Turstain fils de Rou le Blanc eut pour nom,
au Bec-en-Caux avait maison";
[Modern English]: "Turstin FitzRou the White was his name,
had home at Bec-en-Caux.")

== In combat at Hastings ==
Orderic Vitalis wrote, sometime after 1110, "Turstinus filius Rollonis vexillum Normannorum portavit" ("Turstin son of Rollo carried the standard of the Normans.")

Wace wrote in his chronicle Roman de Rou as follows (loosely translated and dramatised by Sir Edward Creasy):

Then the Duke called for the standard which the Pope had sent him, and, he who bore it having unfolded it, the Duke took it and called to Raoul de Conches. "Bear my standard" said he "for I would not but do you right; by right and by ancestry your line are standard-bearers of Normandy, and very good knights have they all been". But Raoul said that he would serve the Duke that day in other guise, and would fight the English with his hand as long as life should last.

Then the Duke bade Walter Giffard bear the standard. But he was old and white-headed, and bade the Duke give the standard to some younger and stronger man to carry. Then the Duke said fiercely, "by the splendour of God, my lords, I think you mean to betray and fail me in this great need". Giffard replied "Sire, not so! we have done no treason, nor do I refuse from any felony toward you; but I have to lead a great chivalry, both hired men and the men of my fief. Never had I such good means of serving you as I now have; and, if God please, I will serve you; if need be I will die for you, and will give my own heart for yours". "By my faith" quoth the Duke, "I always loved thee, and now I love thee more; if I survive this day, thou shalt be the better for it all thy days". Then he called out a knight, whom he had heard much praised, Tosteins Fitz-Rou le Blanc by name, whose abode was at Bec-en-Caux. To him he delivered the standard, and Tosteins took it right cheerfully, and bowed low to him in thanks, and bore it gallantly and with good heart. His kindred still have quittance of all service for their inheritance on this account, and their heirs are entitled so to hold their inheritance forever.

It is thought by some that Turstin is depicted on the Bayeux Tapestry as standard bearer, yet the mounted knight so depicted is more likely to be Eustace II, Count of Boulogne, due to the embroidered annotation above E...TIUS, apparently a Latinised form of Eustace. The figure is shown in conversation with Duke William, and points to the rear, urging a retreat, as he is recorded as having done by William of Poitiers:

With a harsh voice he (Duke William) called to Eustace of Boulogne, who with 50 knights was turning in flight and was about to give the signal for retreat. This man came up to the Duke and said in his ear that he ought to retire since he would court death if he went forward. But at the very moment when he uttered the words Eustace was struck between the shoulders with such force that blood gushed out from his mouth and nose and half dead he only made his escape with the aid of his followers.

Yet the matter is not certain as William of Poitiers does not mention Eustace as having been a standard bearer, whilst the figure otherwise so convincingly Eustace in the Tapestry clearly is holding what appears to be the papal banner, depicting a cross.

== Land holdings in England and Wales ==
Turstin was recorded in the Domesday Book of 1086 as holding many manors, many of them presumably grants for loyal service to William of Normandy. He appears to have been the first holder of the extensive Barony of North Cadbury, Somerset, which included several manors in nearby counties.

In particular, the Domesday Book of 1086 also recorded Turstin holding a small colony of eight carucates of land (about 1.5 square miles) in the jurisdiction of Caerleon seemingly just within the welsh Lordship of Gwynllwg held by Owain ap Caradog, son of Caradog ap Gruffydd and ancestor of the welsh Lords of Caerleon. Caerleon Castle was a Motte and Bailey Norman-style castle erected by the Welsh lords and/or Norman invaders on the western bank of the River Usk at the edge of the site of a Roman castle known as Ischia (Isca Augusta), which formed the southern end of the early western border of England with Wales. There were 2 serfs and one plough within the demesne lands. Also listed on the manor were three Welshmen with as many ploughs and carucates, who continued their Welsh customs (leges Walensi viventes). The manor was valued at 40 shillings. Turstin did not hold the land directly from the king, but from William de Scohies (or de Ecouis), a magnate of unknown antecedents with lands in Hereford and the Marches, Norfolk and in several other counties. Caerleon itself may have remained in Welsh hands, or changed hands frequently.

Turstin also held some property in Chepstow, just east of Caerleon, and the important crossing to Aust in Gloucestershire on the opposite east bank of the River Severn estuary.

=== From the King ===
Gloucestershire

- Alvington, Gloucestershire (Alwintune)
- Ampney Crucis, Gloucestershire (Omenel). There were 2 other holdings here, "Baldwin" from the King and Humphrey the Chamberlain.
- Fretherne, Gloucestershire (Fridorne)
- Hillesley, Gloucestershire (Hildeslei). Sub-enfeoffed to Bernard (Pancevolt?)
- King's Stanley, Gloucestershire (Stantone). Tovi also held a manor here.
- Oakley, Gloucestershire (Achelie). There were 3 manors here, thought to have lain to the immediate west of Cirencester, by Coates. Turstin's is thought to have been Oakley Wood.
- Tortworth, Gloucestershire (Torteword)

Somerset

- Blackford, Somerset (near Wincanton) (Blacheford/Blachafort). There were 2 manors here, one held by Glastonbury Abbey, sub-enfeoffed to "Alwaker", the other held by Turstin sub-enfeoffed to "Alfward".
- Little Keyford, Somerset (Caivel/Chaivert/Kaivert). 2 manors, one held by Geoffrey de Montbray, Bishop of Coutances, sub-enfeoffed to "Nigel", the other held by Turstin, sub-enfeoffed to "Norman".
- Maperton, Somerset (Malpertone/Malperettona). Sub-enfeoffed to "Geoffrey".
- North Cadbury, Somerset (Cadeberie/beria). The later caput of the eponymous barony which retained many of Turstin's landholdings.
- Pitcombe, Somerset (near present Godminster Farm) (Pidecome/coma)
- South Cadbury, Somerset (Sudcadeberie/Sutcadaberia/deberia). Sub-enfeoffed to Bernard Pancevolt "a clerk and an Englishman". Thought to be the site of Camelot Castle.
- Syndercombe, Somerset (now flooded by Clatworthy Reservoir) (Sindercome)
- Woolston, Somerset (in South Cadbury) (Ufetone/tona/tuna). There were 2 holdings here: Robert, Count of Mortain, 1st Earl of Cornwall, held one part, sub-enfeoffed to "Drogo", the 2nd part was held by Turstin FitzRolf, seb-enfeoffed to "Leofgeat". The connection to Robert Mortain should not be taken as evidence of any identity of Turstin with Turstin Sheriff of Cornwall, as Robert held many hundred manors throughout the kingdom.

Berkshire

- Sparsholt, Berkshire (now Oxon.)
- Coleshill, Berkshire. (now Oxon.) Turstin held 1 of 5 manors here.
- Childrey, Berkshire (now Oxon.) ("Celrea"). Turstin held 1 of 3 manors here, sub-enfeoffed to Roger.
- Upton, Berkshire (now Oxon.). ("Optone")

Buckinghamshire

- Little Kimble, Buckinghamshire ("Kemble Parva"). Sub-enfeoffed to Albert.
- Hardwick, Buckinghamshire ("Harduic"). 1 of 3 manors held by Turstin, others held by Robert of Mortain and Miles Crispin, both sub-enfeoffed.

Dorset

- Gillingham, Dorset ("Gelingeham") Turstin held 1 manor of 5 or 6, subenfeoffed to Bernard (Pancevolt?)
- Allington, Dorset ("Adelingtone")
- Nyland, Dorset ("Iland"/"Inlande") 1 of 2 manors held by Turstin, the other by Robert of Mortain.
- Stoke Wallis, Dorset ("Stoche") 1 of 2 manoprs held by Turstin, sub-enfeoffed to Ranulf.

Herefordshire

- Little Marcle, Herefordshire ("Merchelai"). 1 of 2 manors held by Turstin, sub-enfeoffed to another "Turstin". The other manor was held by Roger de Lacy.

Hampshire

- Newton Valence, Hampshire ("Newentone")

=== From the Bishop of Worcester ===
Gloucestershire

- Aust, Gloucestershire (Austreclive). 5 hides.
- Gotherington, Gloucestershire (Godrinton).

=== From the Abbot of Westminster ===
Gloucestershire/Worcestershire

- Hasfield, Gloucestershire (Hasfelde). 1 ½ hides.
- Eckington, Worcestershire ("Aichintune") 1 of 3 manors held by Turstin.

=== From Walter Giffard, Earl of Buckingham ===
Walter Giffard, 1st Earl of Buckingham (died 1102) was a Norman magnate and fellow proven Companion of William the Conqueror at the Battle of Hastings in 1066. The caput of his feudal honour was at Crendon, Buckinghamshire.

- Great Missenden, Buckinghamshire

== Succession ==
Clearly Turstin had "kindred" and "heirs" as referred to by Wace, yet these may have been in Normandy only, since no record of any familial inheritance exists for his English holdings. Turstin is said by some sources to have had a son named Ralph (FitzTurstin) who went on crusade to the Holy Land, where he died.

Most of Turstin's lands, which later constituted a feudal barony, did not pass to his son, if indeed such existed, but to another apparently unrelated Norman magnate Wynebald de Ballon, who served for a time as seneschal of Caerleon Castle, whilst his elder brother Hamelin de Ballon had founded Abergavenny Castle 15 miles higher up the River Usk, and founded a barony seated at Much Marcle, i.e. next to, and possibly subsuming, Turstin's own manor of Little Marcle. Wynebald also inherited, almost intact, the lands comprising Turstin's fief, which is known collectively as the barony of North Cadbury. The reason for this transfer is not clear, whether by death or by his having fallen out of royal favour.

It is possible that Turstin was a supporter of Duke Robert of Normandy, the Conqueror's eldest son who tried to wrest the kingdom of England from William Rufus, his younger brother who had had himself crowned very rapidly at Westminster following the Conqueror's death. Turstin would therefore have found himself on the losing side, and as is known to have happened to others in that situation, would have forfeited his lands. Such banishment is known to have been the fate of Turstin's other two neighbours at Oakley in Gloucestershire, Gislebert FitzTurold and Roger de Lacy, both banished from the kingdom in 1088.

== Sources ==
- Transactions of the Bristol & Gloucestershire Archaeological Society, 1879–80, vol.4, On the Landholders of Gloucestershire Named in Domesday Book, by Alfred S. Ellis, esp. chap. LXVII, TVRSTINVS FILIVS ROLF, pp. 186–188 (www.bgas.org.uk)
- www.domesdaybook.co.uk;
- Douglas, D.C. & Greenaway, G.W. (eds.) English Historical Documents 1042–1189, London, 1959.
