= North Cadbury Court =

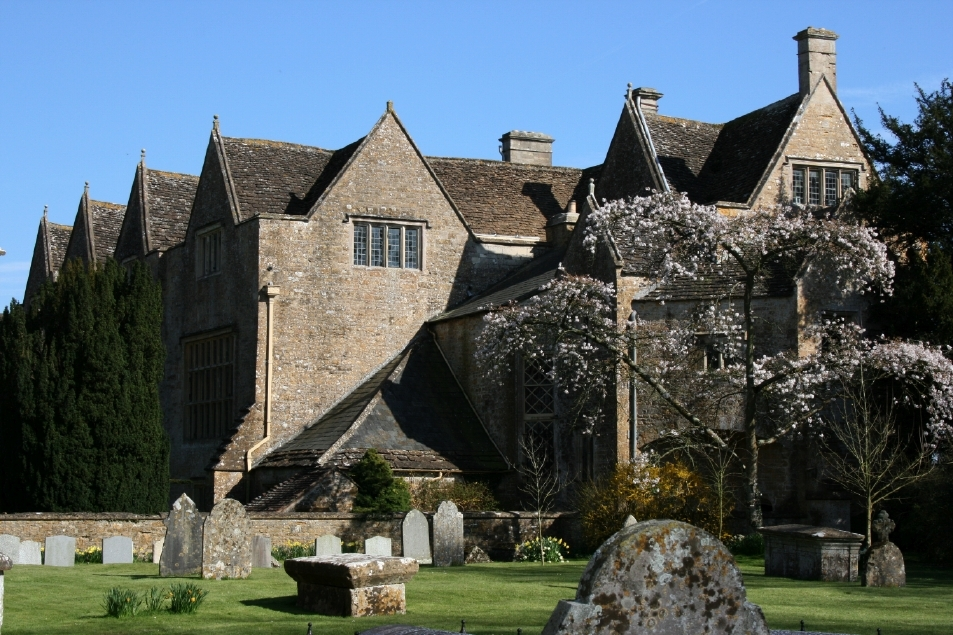
- Old mansion house with triangular roofs. In the foreground is a garden with gravestones.

- Location within Somerset
- 51°02′29″N 2°31′14.2″W
- Location: North Cadbury, Somerset, England

History
- Built: c 1580-1610

Listed Building – Grade I
- Official name: North Cadbury Court
- Designated: 24 March 1961
- Reference no.: 1178213

North Cadbury Court in North Cadbury, Somerset, England is a country house built around 1580–1610, by Sir Francis Hastings. It has been designated as a Grade I listed building.

Hastings bought North Cadbury from his older brother Henry Hastings, 3rd Earl of Huntingdon. He had lived on the estate for several years previously while he managed his brother's estates in the Southwest. After Francis's wife Magdalene died in 1596, Hastings sold the court with the rest of the manor to Matthew Ewens, one of the Barons of the Exchequer. His great-nephew, also called Matthew Ewens, sold the manor to Arthur Duck. The house and estate was subsequently bought by Richard Newman c.1620; the Newman family owned it until around 1796 when it was bought by the Bennett family. Around 1800 the courtyard was turned into a ballroom and the south façade rebuilt in Georgian style.

In 1910 the court was bought by Sir Archibald Langman and remains in his family. It is currently available to rent for private parties and weddings, and has 25 bedrooms and 19 bathrooms.

During the 1980s the interior fittings and decoration of the adjacent Church of St Michael were damaged beyond repair. The local sculptor John Robinson designed modern figures to replace them. Some controversy arose about the figures and they were eventually placed on the wall of the stables at North Cadbury Court which overlooks the churchyard.

It was a filming location for the BBC Persuasion (2007 film) starring Sally Hawkins and Rupert Penry-Jones as Kellynch Hall, the ancestral home of the Elliots.

== See also ==
- List of Grade I listed buildings in South Somerset
