= Wynebald de Ballon =

Anglo-Norman landowner (c.1058–c.1126)

Location of Ballon in the ancient province of Maine

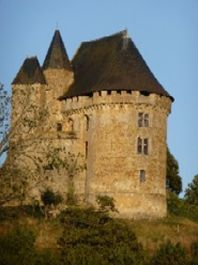
Donjon de Ballon, "Gateway to Maine". The surviving structure dates from 12th to 15th centuries

Wynebald de Ballon (variously spelt Baalun, Baalan, Balun, Balodun, Balon etc.), (c.1058–c.1126), was an early Norman magnate. He appeared in England during the reign of William Rufus, along with his brother, Hamelin de Ballon, later created 1st Baron of Abergavenny.

== Origin ==
Wynebald was born in France, probably as his brother Hamelin was known to have been, in the ancient castle of Ballon, 12 miles north of Le Mans, capital of the ancient County of Maine. From its strength the castle was known as "The Gateway to Maine". Ballon is today a French commune, in the department of Sarthe (72), in the modern region of Pays de la Loire. Maine was invaded and conquered by William Duke of Normandy in the early 1060s, just prior to his invasion of England.

== Career ==
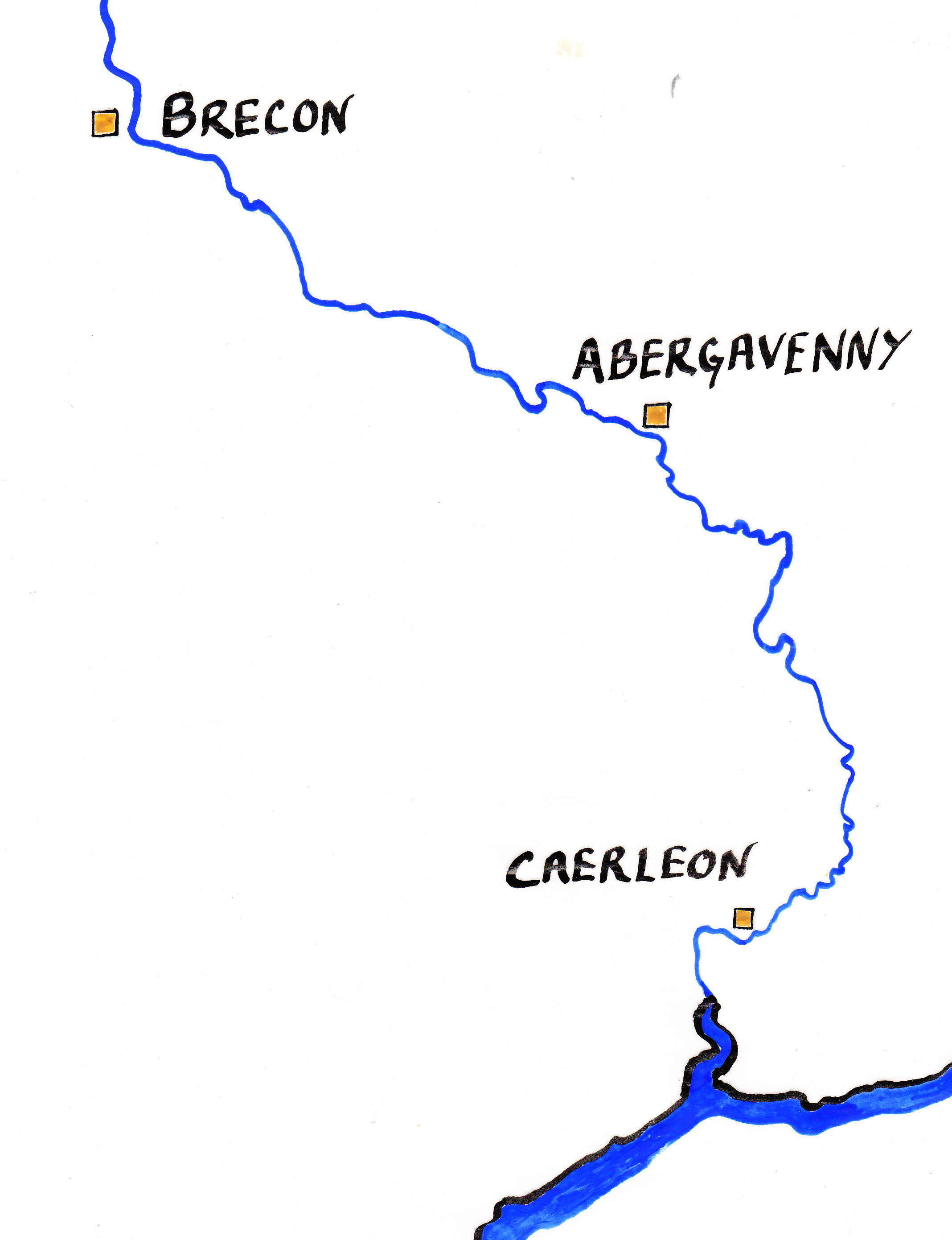
The Lower River Usk. Caerleon was the lordship of Wynebald de Ballon, Abergavenny that of his brother Hamelin.

The two brothers, Hamelin and Wynebald, were put in charge respectively of securing Abergavenny and Caerleon. Wynebald received the lordship at Caerleon, in the southern Welsh marches, in about 1088 from King William II (1087–1100).

== Donations to Bermondsey Abbey ==
Bermondsey Abbey was founded in 1082 by a wealthy citizen of the City of London, Alwin Child. It was of the Cluniac order, held in much affection by the first Norman kings, as witnessed by William II (1087–1100) having donated his royal manor of Bermondsey, Surrey as its site. It was directly across the River Thames from the Tower of London, recently built by William I (1066–1087) as his principal seat.

In 1092 Wynebald de Ballon, no doubt to please William II, made several donations of land to Bermondsey Abbey. These were:

- Upton. Shortly after 1086 he acquired the manor of Upton, then in Berkshire, today in Oxfordshire, and in 1092 donated a moiety of it to Bermondsey. It was thereafter known as Prior's Barne, and was held by Bermondsey Priory until Dissolution.
- Hardwick, Buckinghamshire. With his son Roger, he alienated part of Hardwick to Bermondsey. This donation included a church with its tithes and six yardlands. The Priory sold the church in the 13th or 14th century.
- Weedon, next to Hardwick.
- Bridesthorne, Buckinghamshire. In 1092 he donated Bridesthorne Manor to Bermondsey Abbey.
- Eastington, Gloucestershire. He donated the tithes to Bermondsey

== Donation to Montacute Priory ==
Montacute Priory in Somerset was, like Bermondsey, a Cluniac house. An earlier donation of Wynebald's to this house, 11 miles SW of North Cadbury, was confirmed in an undated charter of King Henry I(1100–1135) (Charter no. 11 in the Montacute Cartulary):

Charter of the said King Henry concerning the grant of the gifts, which his barons and men have previously made, here expressly named:

Henry, King of England, etc., grants and confirms to his church and monks of Montacute all the gifts which his barons and men of England and Normandy have reasonably made to them. Namely : — of the gift of William, count of Mortain, the market of Montacute and its tolls; of the gift of Avenantus, two dwelling-houses in Meleborn; of the gift of Robert de Pirou, the land of Cantoc; of the gift of Winebaldus de Baalone, the mill of Cadebiri with the man and the land belonging thereto, and the church of Karion; of the gift of Edward the stabler ("Stabularius") the land of Cochra; of the gift of Nicholas Arbalista, twenty shillings of land and his own land of Brugi; of the gift of William son of Rogo, one virgate of land at Colum; of the gift of Robert son of Martin, the land of Thihentone. The aforesaid church and monks of Montacute to hold all the aforesaid with all the liberties and free customs appertaining to the same lands and tenements.

Witnesses : — Philip, bishop of Bayeux; Ro[trodus], bishop of Evreux : Arn[ulf], bishop of Lisieux; Richard de Luci; War[in] son of Ger[old], chamberlain; Manasser Biset, steward; Robert de Dunest[anville] and Richard de Campvilla.

At Baugi.

This donation appears to have been Wilford Mill, within North Cadbury manor.

== Donations to St Vincent's Abbey, Le Mans ==
St Vincent's Abbey (fr:Abbaye Royale Saint-Vincent du Mans), like Bermondsey and Montacute, was Benedictine, but not of the Cluniac variety. It was situated near the walls of Le Mans, capital of Maine. The properties given by Wynebald were the churches of Tortworth and Aust with the tithes of Gotherington, Bishops Cleeve, all in Gloucestershire, together with the tithes of Pidecombe, Somerset. The charters relating to these donations are given below:

[1100–1106.] (Cartulary, A. pp. 334–5.) 1046. Charter of Hamelin de Baladone, giving to the abbey of St. Vincent and St. Lawrence near the walls of Le Mans, from the subsistence with which he has been endowed by his lords William and Henry kings of the English, in England and Wales, all the tithes of all Wennescoit, both of his own [demesne] and of all the lands which he has given or may give [in fee]. He also gives his castle (fn. 32) called Abergavenny (Berguevenis). He gives the church and chapel of the castle and land for making a bourg, with all dues, except the toll on market-day; land also for one plough.… and between.… (fn. 33) water for a fishery.… the church of St. Helen and part of the wood. He also gives the tithe of all his honey and the tithe of skins from his hunting, and the tithe of the pannage of swine. In England (Anglica terra) he gives the church of Caprcolum with the priest's land and all tithes belonging to the church, and the tithe of cheeses and of all firstfruits (primitiarum). He also gives the church of Luton after the death of the priest, with the priest's land and all tithes and firstfruits belonging to the church.

[? 1100–1106.] (Cartulary, A. p. 335.) 1047. Charter of Winebaud, brother of the aforesaid Hamelin, giving the said abbey the churches of Torteoda and Augusta with all tithes, and the tithes of Godriton and Pedicovia and all his tithes in Wales (de Gualensi patria), for the souls of his father and mother etc..…

[1103–1106.] (Cartulary, A. p. 335.) 1048. Charter of Henry I. confirming the above gifts for the souls of his father king William and his mother queen Matildis and his brother king William and all his predecessors.[Signa] Hainrici regis; Mathildis regine; Gaudrici cancellarii; Rogerii episcopi; Willelmi Piperelli; Robert Peccati; Herluini abbatis Glastingeberii; Unfredi Aureis Testiculis; Gaudrici filii Rogerii de Curcella; Winebaudi; Elisabeth uxoris Winebaudi; Hamelini de Baladone; Agnetis uxoris ejus; Willelmi filii Hamelini; Mathei filii ejusdem Hamelini.

== Donation to Gloucester Abbey ==
In 1126 he made a gift to St Peter's Abbey, Gloucester. This appears to have been of his lordship of Rodeford, his mill at Fromelade and half a hide at Ameneye (probably Ampney Crucis, Glos.) King Henry I confirmed the gift of the advowson of the rectory of Inglishcombe in Somerset by Hawise de Gurnay, Wynebald's daughter-in-law, the wife of his son Roger de Ballon.

== Knights ==
The names of two of Wynebald's knights are recorded in connection with their own donations to Bermondsey in 1092: Odo de Tirone gave the advowson of the church and tithes of Ampney Crucis in Gloucester, and Ansger Brito gave the manor of Preston, near Yeovil in Somerset.

== Manors Held ==
Most of Wynebald's landholdings consisted in the former fief of Turstin FitzRolf. Turstin had been standard bearer to William the Conqueror at Hastings, according to Orderic Vitalis(b.1075) in his Ecclesiastical History, written between 1123 and 1141. William had asked successively 2 great nobles to fill the post of standard bearer for him, but both had declined, stating they had contingents of their own retainers to command; effectively they felt their valour would be better displayed taking an active part in the battle. William was therefore grateful for the acceptance of the humbler Turstin, who proved to be very courageous in his duty, and remained at all times by William's side. It was no doubt due to Turstin's loyal service that he was awarded by the Conqueror the several English manors which amounted to a significant fiefdom. It is not certain how or why the transfer of virtually Turstin's entire fiefdom in several English counties came to Wynebald. These lands included not only those Turstin had held in capite from the King, but also his mesne holdings where he held from a non-royal overlord. For some unstated reason commentators seem to rule out a marriage between Wynebald and a daughter of Turstin's as the causal agent behind the transfers. Turstin appears to have been banished and stripped of his land holdings for rebelling against William Rufus.

=== North Cadbury, Som. ===
In 1086, as shown in the Domesday Book, North Cadbury manor in Somerset was held by Turstin fitzRolf. It passed before 1092 to Wynebald, who was recorded as holding it in that year. This appears to have been his principal manor. It passed via his daughter Mabilia to her husband Henry de Newmarch.

=== Dyrham, Glos. ===
The manor of Dyrham, Glos. passed to the Newmarch family from Wynebald de Ballon

== Marriage and issue ==
By his wife Elizabeth he had two sons, Roger and Milo, and one daughter, Mabilia. Roger, the elder son, died in about 1126 having confirmed in the same year his father's grant to Gloucester Abbey. He had married Hawise de Gournay, by whom he had three sons, Roger, Hamelin and Arnold, all of whom died without issue before 1166. His daughter Mabilia, the wife of Henry Newmarch, therefore became his sole heiress. She confirmed her father's grant to Bermondsey.

== Succession ==
He was succeeded in his estates by his son-in-law, Henry of Newmarch.

== Sources ==
- Sanders, I. J. English Baronies: A Study of their Origin and Descent, 1086–1327, 1960.
- Cokayne, G.E. Complete Peerage
