= Church of St Michael, North Cadbury =

Church of St Michael
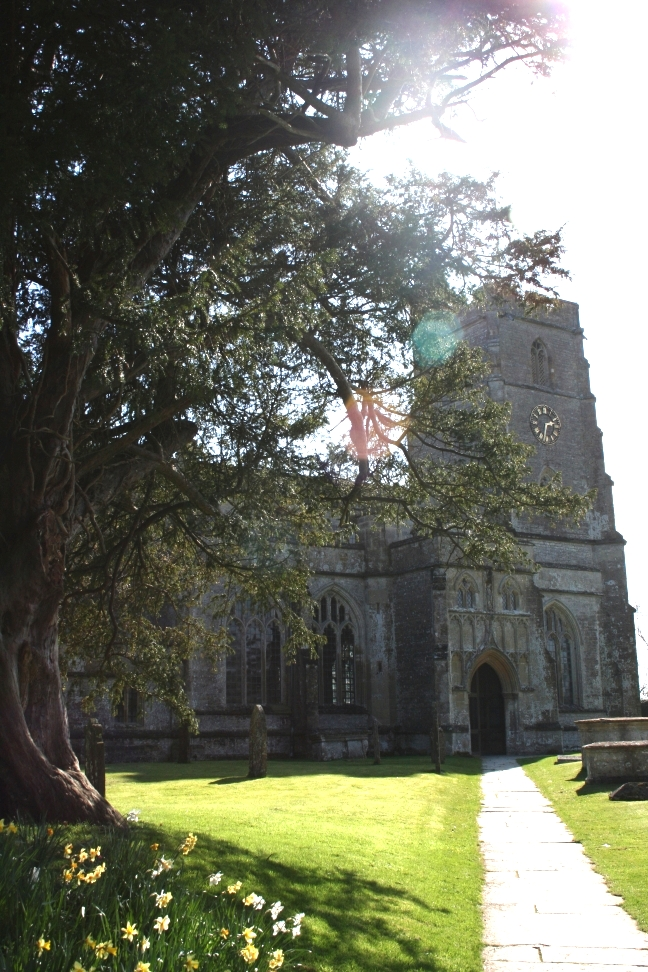

- Location within Somerset
- 51°02′30″N 2°31′16.9″W
- Location: North Cadbury, Somerset, England

History
- Built: 1417

Listed Building – Grade I
- Designated: 24 March 1961
- Reference no.: 1178133

The Church of St Michael in North Cadbury, Somerset, England, dates from 1417, although the tower was built a few years earlier. It has been designated as a Grade I listed building.

In 1423 Lord and Lady de Botreaux were granted a royal licence to form a college of seven chaplains. As a result, the nave and chancel were rebuilt although the earlier three-stage tower was left intact.

Henry Hastings, 3rd Earl of Huntingdon granted the patronage of the church to Emmanuel College, Cambridge, leading to a dispute between the college and the owner of the manor of North Cadbury that became famous in the history of mortgage law. From the 17th century until 1979 the church remained under the patronage of Emmanuel College, Cambridge, and every rector from the mid-17th century to the mid-20th century was a former fellow of the college.

The church includes elaborately carved bench ends dating from the 1530s. The decoration includes not just religious imagery but also birds and animals along with local people at work.

During the 1980s the interior fittings and decoration of the church were damaged beyond repair. The local sculptor John Robinson designed modern figures to replace them. Some controversy arose about the figures and they were eventually placed on the wall of the adjacent North Cadbury Court which overlooks the churchyard.

The parish is part of the Camelot Parishes benefice within the Bruton and Cary deanery.

== Burials ==
- William de Botreaux, 3rd Baron Botreaux

== See also ==
- Grade I listed buildings in South Somerset
- List of Somerset towers
- List of ecclesiastical parishes in the Diocese of Bath and Wells
