= TechVets =

TechVets is a UK not-for-profit company which supports military veterans and service leavers into careers in information security.

Launched in early 2018, with General Sir Richard Barrons, KCB, CBE as the Ambassador. The volunteer-run organisation works in partnership with The Royal Foundation, The Ministry of Defence, and CREST.

The organisation launched The Veterans' Cyber Academy through partnership with Immersive Labs. The company quotes Robert Hannigan, former Director of GCHQ, as having called it "the most exciting thing I’ve seen in this space: scalable, agile and appropriate to the way a new generation learns.". By February 2019 more than 2,000 veterans have received the free training
