= Bec-de-Mortagne =

- Commune
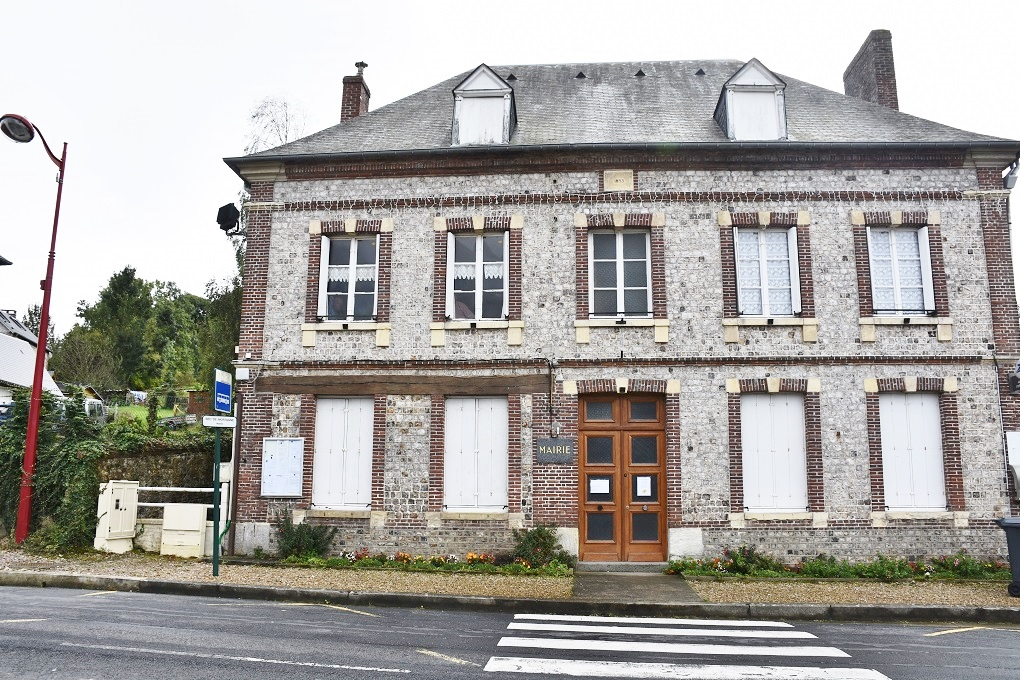
- The town hall in Bec-de-Mortagne
- Location of Bec-de-Mortagne
- Location within France Location within Normandy
- Coordinates: 49°42′17″N 0°26′54″E
- Country: France
- Region: Normandy
- Department: Seine-Maritime
- Arrondissement: Le Havre
- Canton: Saint-Romain-de-Colbosc
- Intercommunality: CC Campagne de Caux

Government
  - Mayor (2026–32): Pascal Mabire
- Area^{1}: 11.94 km^{2} (4.61 sq mi)
- Elevation: 50 m (160 ft)
- Highest elevation: 135 m (443 ft)
- Lowest elevation: 32 m (105 ft)
- Population (2023): 703
  - Density: 58.9/km^{2} (152/sq mi)
- Time zone: UTC+01:00 (CET)
  - Summer (DST): UTC+02:00 (CEST)
- INSEE/Postal code: 76068 /76110
- ^{1} French Land Register data, which excludes lakes, ponds, glaciers > 1 km^{2} (0.386 sq mi or 247 acres) and river estuaries.

Bec-de-Mortagne (French pronunciation: [bɛk də mɔʁtaɲ]) is a commune in the Seine-Maritime department in the Normandy region in northern France.

== Geography ==
A farming village situated in the wooded valley of the river Ganzeville, in the Pays de Caux, some 19 miles (31 km) northeast of Le Havre, at the junction of the D69 and the D28.

== History ==
The name comes from ‘’Becr’’, a Norse word for stream, together with the name of the Mortagne family, seigneurs of the village.

Bec-de-Mortagne in the Pays de Caux is thought to be the birth-place of Turstin FitzRolf, standard bearer to William the Conqueror at the Battle of Hastings in 1066, as he was described by the 12th-century chronicler Orderic Vitalis as from "Bec-en-Caux".

Around 1175, Guillaume de Mortagne gave the parish church to the Archbishop of Rouen, ( Willelmi Becco of Moritania) who gave it to the chapter after his death, stipulating that the priest should have a third of the tithes and the canon two-thirds.

A knight, Henri de Soteville, sought possession of the church. He was excommunicated, but having later submitted, the excommunication was lifted.

In the 13th century, Bec-Moreteigne had 500 inhabitants and the parish priest was paid 15 pounds .

The year 1562 saw the formal civil status of Bec de Mortagne granted and in 1824 it was joined with the former parish of Baigneville to form the present commune.

== Population ==
Historical population
Year	Pop.	±% p.a.
1968	569	—
1975	525	−1.14%
1982	555	+0.80%
1990	576	+0.47%
1999	615	+0.73%
2007	670	+1.08%
2012	681	+0.33%
2017	661	−0.59%
2023	703	+1.03%
Source: INSEE

== Places of interest ==
- The church of St.Martin, dating from the 11th century.
- Traces of a medieval castle.
- An 18th-century presbytery

== See also ==
- Communes of the Seine-Maritime department
