= Ampney St Peter =

Village in Gloucestershire, England

Coordinates: 51.7116°N 1.8836°W

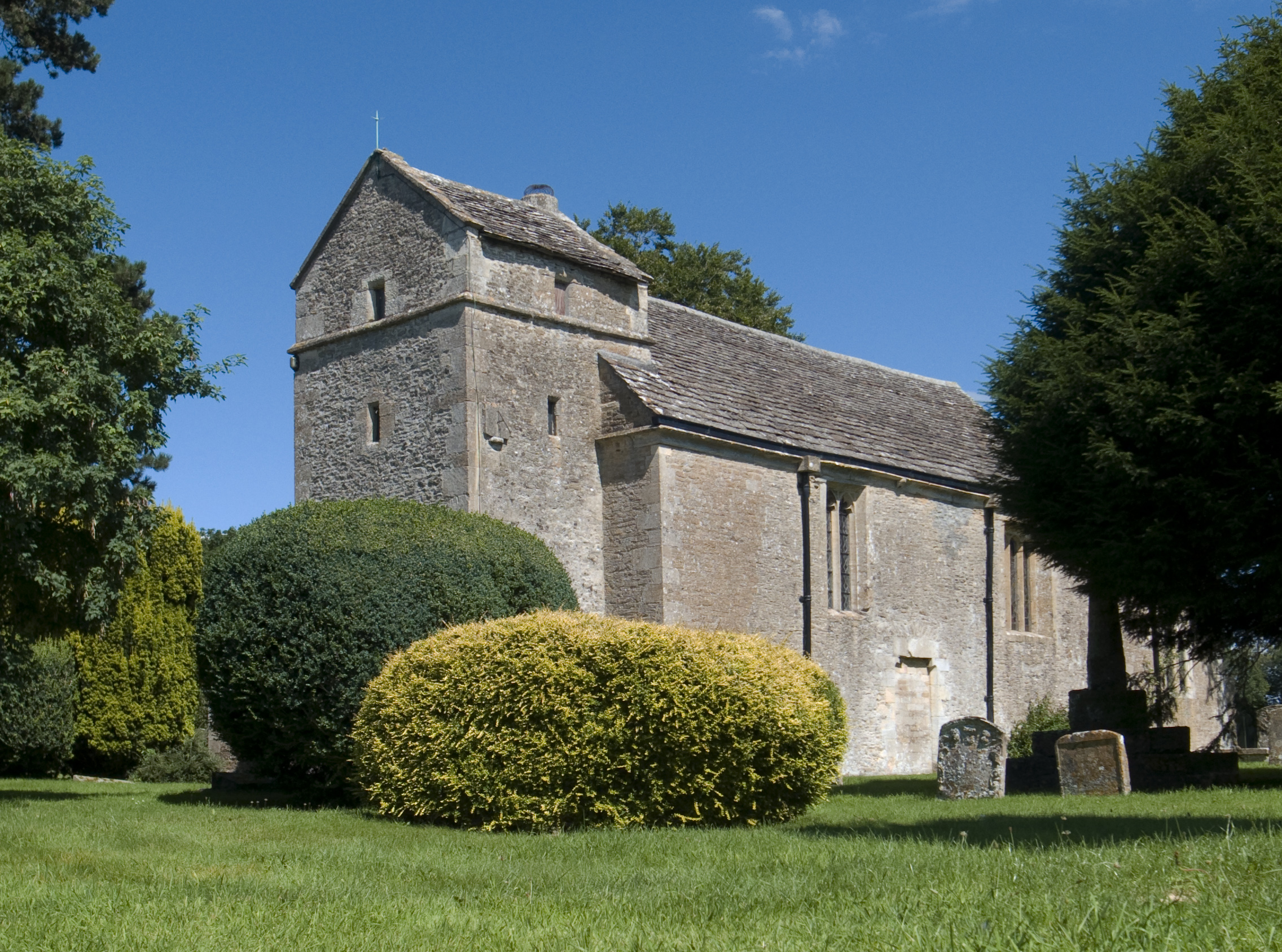
- The church of St Peter

- Location within Gloucestershire
- Population: 75
- OS grid reference: SP080014
- Civil parish: Ampney St Peter
- District: Cotswold
- Shire county: Gloucestershire
- Region: South West
- Country: England
- Sovereign state: United Kingdom
- Postcode district: GL7 5SH
- Police: Gloucestershire
- Fire: Gloucestershire
- Ambulance: South Western
- UK Parliament: South Cotswolds

Ampney St Peter is a small village and civil parish in the Cotswolds and part of the Cotswold local government district in Gloucestershire, England. According to the 2014 mid year estimate, the parish had a population of 75. Locally, the town was known as Easington.

The Ampney Brook flows near the village, which is near to Ampney Crucis and Ampney St Mary, and is about four miles east of Cirencester.

== History ==
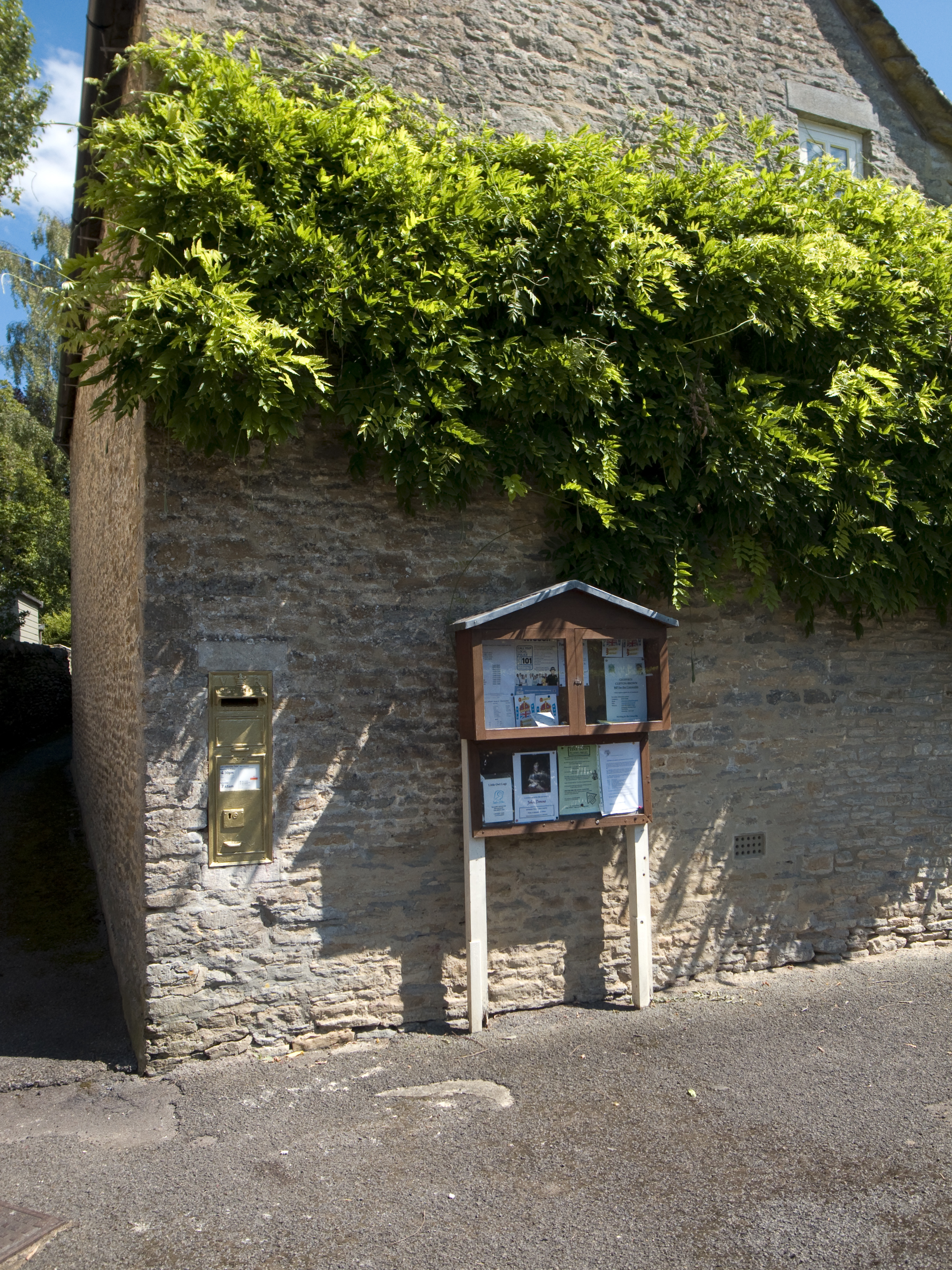
The gold-painted post box to celebrate Laura Bechtolsheimer's equestrian team dressage gold medal at the 2012 Summer Olympics

Ranbury Ring to the south east of the village is the remains of an Iron Age enclosed settlement or bivallate hillfort covering 4.6 hectares (11 acres), and surrounded by a ditch and rampart. It has been scheduled as an ancient monument. Nearby is a Neolithic burial pit.

The Red Lion is an 18th-century Grade II listed public house. It is on the Campaign for Real Ale's National Inventory of Historic Pub Interiors.

== Religious buildings ==
The Anglican Church of St. Peter has late Saxon origins. It is Grade II* listed. The fabric of the current building dates from the late 12th or early 13th century and underwent Victorian restoration, and was largely rebuilt by George Gilbert Scott in 1878. It consists of a four-bay nave and chancel with a three-stage west tower supported by diagonal buttresses.

Inside the church is a Sheela na gig. The font is from the 15th century. The Romanesque archways were moved from their original positions during the Victorian restoration.

In the churchyard is a 14th century cross which is both a listed building and has been scheduled as an ancient monument. There is also a chest tomb and gravestones to the local Taylor family.

== Notable residents ==
The village is the hometown of Dressage Olympian Laura Bechtolsheimer, a long term member of the British Dressage team. In August 2012, the village's postbox was painted gold by Royal Mail to signify the gold medal earned by Bechtolsheimer in the 2012 Olympic team dressage.
