= Oakley, Gloucestershire =

District of Cheltenham, England

Coordinates: 51.902°N 2.042°W

Oakley
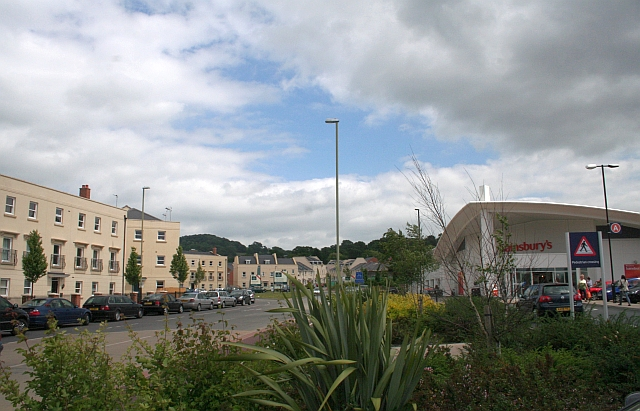
- New Development, Oakley

- Location within Gloucestershire
- OS grid reference: SO9722
- District: Cheltenham
- Shire county: Gloucestershire
- Region: South West
- Country: England
- Sovereign state: United Kingdom
- Post town: Cheltenham
- Postcode district: GL52
- Police: Gloucestershire
- Fire: Gloucestershire
- Ambulance: South Western
- UK Parliament: Cheltenham

Oakley is a district of Cheltenham in Gloucestershire, England. In the Domesday Book of 1086, it is recorded as held by Turstin FitzRolf. Oakley primarily consists of residential housing, including private, council-owned, and social housing. It backs onto Cleeve Hill and Harp Hill, greenbelt land, and part of the Cotswold hills, including a covered reservoir. Oakley neighbours Prestbury and Whaddon.

Until December 2011, it was home to the smaller of Cheltenham's two Government Communications Headquarters (GCHQ) sites, Subsequently, part of the GCHQ Oakley site was reclaimed and replaced with a Sainsbury's supermarket.
