= Red Lion, Ampney St Peter =

Listed pub in Gloucestershire, England

Red Lion
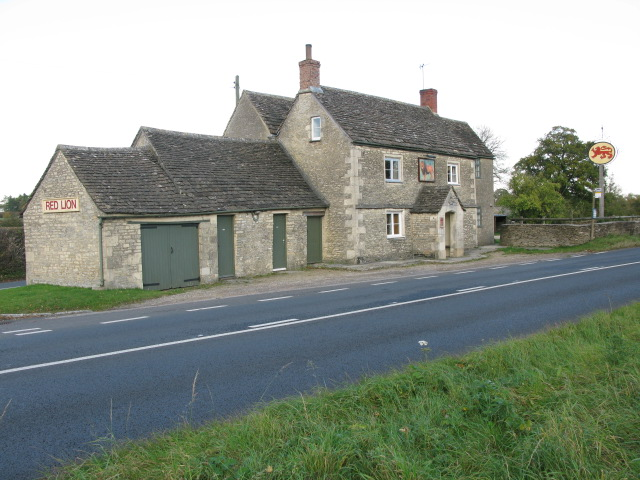
- The pub in 2009

General information
- Type: Public house
- Location: Ampney St Peter, Gloucestershire, England
- Coordinates: 51.711391°N 1.873457°W
- Year built: 18th century

Design and construction
- Designations

Listed Building – Grade II
- Official name: The Red Lion public house
- Designated: 4 March 2008
- Reference no.: 1392432

The Red Lion is a Grade II listed public house in Ampney St Peter, a village in Gloucestershire, England. Dating from the 18th century and operating as a beerhouse by 1792, it retains a notably unaltered historic interior. The pub is included on the Campaign for Real Ale (CAMRA)'s National Inventory of Historic Pub Interiors, where it has a three-star rating and is regarded as being of "outstanding national historic importance". After closing in 2014, it reopened under new management in 2023.

== History ==
The buildings comprise a public house and house dating from the 18th century, with attached outbuildings and a 20th-century extension to the east. The premises were operating as a beerhouse by 1792, when it formed part of an estate sold with several cottages and adjoining land. In 1851 it was acquired by John and Edwin Cook of Tetbury Brewery following the auction of the estate of its previous owner, John Howse. A John Spencer was recorded as publican in 1856. James Wilkins became landlord in 1887 and remained in the role until his death in 1939, a tenure of 52 years. He was succeeded by his son, Horace Wilkins, who served as landlord until 1975.

The property was tied to Tetbury Brewery from 1851 until 1913, when it passed to Stroud Brewery. Although its brewery ownership changed during the 20th century, the building underwent relatively few alterations beyond the extension and the provision of lavatories in an adjoining outbuilding.

On 4 March 2008, the Red lion was designated a Grade II listed building. It was included on the Campaign for Real Ale (CAMRA)'s National Inventory of Historic Pub Interiors before the inventory's grading system was revised. Under the revised scheme, it is rated three stars and its interior is regarded as being "of outstanding national historic importance". The Red Lion closed in 2014 following the death of its long-serving landlord and reopened under new management in 2023.

== Architecture ==
=== Exterior ===
Built of local stone with a stone-slate roof, the building incorporates a later 20th-century addition on the east side. The main part and the extension are relatively deep in layout, with smaller attached ranges to either side. The principal elevation has two storeys and is arranged around a central entrance. A porch, probably added in the 19th century, projects from the front and contains fixed wooden seating. The entrance retains a historic glazed door, and the windows are timber-framed. An attached range to the west contains lavatory facilities.

=== Interior ===
The interior in 2024

The interior is arranged around a central entrance hall, with the principal rooms on either side. The hall retains wooden wall panelling, parquet flooring and historic doors, and provides access to the kitchen and cellar at the rear. The pub's layout remains largely unchanged and is notable for having no conventional bar counter, a feature now rare in British pubs. One of the main rooms is simply furnished, with a corner fireplace, wooden panelling, fitted shelving and a tiled floor.

Beer is served directly from pumps mounted on the wall, with storage below in the cellar. The room also retains built-in seating, window seats and internal shutters. Other surviving features include a sliding serving hatch from the hall, originally used for off-sales and still used for service when the bar is busy. The room on the opposite side of the hall, formerly used as the family kitchen, contains similar wall panelling, fixed bench seating, a historic fireplace surround, and matching window seats and shutters.
