= Benhall, Cheltenham =

District of Cheltenham, Gloucestershire, England

Coordinates: 51°53′40″N 2°7′0″W

Benhall
- Population: 3,260
- Region: South West
- Country: England
- Sovereign state: United Kingdom
- Post town: Cheltenham

Benhall is a small district within the town of Cheltenham, Gloucestershire. It lies south-west of the town centre, just south of the A40, the main road to Gloucester, and north of the district of Up Hatherley. It falls mainly within the Anglican parish of St Mark.

Much of the area consists of the Benhall (originally Benhall Farm) Estate, developed mainly in the late 1950s and early 1960s on land that had previously been farmland (mainly pasture), and takes its name from the farm that formerly stood there (at the site of the current Notgrove Close). The district is divided in two by a stream with steep banks, surrounded by a narrow area of grass and woodland. Many of the roads are named after villages in the surrounding countryside. "Robert Burns Avenue" was named after the Scottish poet, after complaints that he was not among the poets with roads named after them in the older St Mark's estate (Tennyson, Byron, Shakespeare, etc.), even though he had a personal link with Cheltenham (his sons retired to the town).

Benhall Farm was one of the plains used by the WWII U.S. Army Services of Supply, European Theater of Operations as a staging site for trucks, tanks, jeeps, artillery and weather-resistant materiel during the Operation Bolero buildup in the British Isles prior to the Operation Overlord invasion of Normandy on 6 June 1944. The SOS-ETO had its western-England headquarters at Cheltenham.

St Mark's Church of England Junior School and Benhall Infants School, along with a playgroup, are located on Robert Burns Avenue in Benhall.

The last census recorded the population of Benhall at 3260. The area has an active residents' association. In local government it forms part of the ward of Benhall and the Reddings. The population of this Ward in the 2011 Census was 5,071.

There are 1,362 households within the Benhall district and an average unemployment rate of 1.7%.

Benhall is the location of 'The Doughnut', the nickname given to the headquarters of the Government Communications Headquarters (GCHQ), the British intelligence agency who specialise in signals intelligence and cryptography.
