= Ampney Crucis =

Village in Gloucestershire, England

Coordinates: 51.716°N 1.907°W

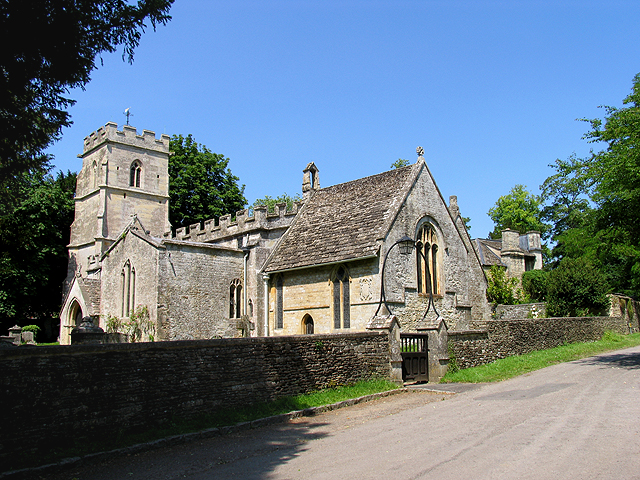

- Location within Gloucestershire
- Population: 636
- OS grid reference: SP0601
  - London: 80 mi (130 km) E
- District: Cotswold
- Shire county: Gloucestershire
- Region: South West
- Country: England
- Sovereign state: United Kingdom
- Post town: Cirencester
- Postcode district: GL7
- Dialling code: 01285
- Police: Gloucestershire
- Fire: Gloucestershire
- Ambulance: South Western
- UK Parliament: South Cotswolds

Ampney Crucis is a village and civil parish in the Cotswolds, part of the Cotswold District of Gloucestershire, England.

The village is in the Ampney-Coln electoral ward. This ward stretches from Ampney Crucis to Coln St. Dennis in the north. The total population of the ward at the 2011 census was 1,884.

The Ampney Brook, a tributary of the River Thames, flows through the village, which is near the smaller villages of Ampney St Mary and Ampney St Peter, and about 3 miles (5 km) east of Cirencester.

== History ==
At the time of the 1086 Domesday Book, the village was known as Omenie; in later centuries the name changed to Aminel, Aminie and eventually to Ampney. In 1086, the lord of the village was Turstin FitzRolf. A recent translation of the entry in the Book states: "In GARSDON Hundred Thurstan son of Rolf holds AMPNEY (Crucis) from the King".

The village takes its current name (Latin for "Ampney of the Cross") from the brook and the 15th century cross in the churchyard of the parish church, the Church of the Holy Rood.

The Church of the Holy Rood is a Grade I listed building described as an "Anglican parish church. Saxon foundation, with some Norman work and elements from all periods including C15 tower and re-roofing of nave, up to restoration of 1870". The Ampney Crucis cross in the church courtyard is also Grade I listed, described as "Late C14/early C15" and restored in the late 20th century. The head was missing for years but was found in the tower in 1860 and reinstalled.

In 1671 when households were assessed for the hearth tax, Ampney House was described as a "modest mansion in a park" and had ten hearths, while the Lloyds, the only other gentry family in the village, had seven hearths. Of the remaining dwellings with hearths, ten were exempt on the grounds of poverty while the remaining households each had a single hearth. At that time, apart from the lord of the manor and the Lloyds, the inhabitants of the parish were mostly their tenants; labourers, husbandmen and craftsmen, each with their own patch of ground to supply the family with food.

In 1722, Sir John Playdell endowed a charity daily school. The population of the village's 2660 acres in 1801 was 541 and in 1831, it was 599.

Many buildings in Ampney Crucis bear a Historic designation.

The Grade II listed Ampney Park manor was built in the late 1500s and was extended in the 18th and 19th centuries. Also Grade II listed, the small detached lodge was built in the mid-1600s and expanded in 1893. The manor was built by John Pleydell; in 1724 it passed to the Yorkshire Dawnays. In 1765, it was sold to Samuel Blackwell; during his tenure the long Georgian north wing was added. A historical record states that the manor was the seat of Earl Dulcie in 1830, having rented the property after Blackwell's death. The property was acquired in the 1890s by Edmund Cripps who extended the building.

The 8-bedroom manor was listed for sale in 2018 as a 15,000 sq ft house with "magnificent equestrian facilities, a swimming pool, a 17th century Grand Hall", library and many other amenities, including a billiards room (added by Edmund Cripps).

== Governance ==
Ampney Crucis has a Parish Council, currently with 6 members.

As of May 2015 the village became part of 'The Ampneys and Hampton Ward' on Cotswold District Council. The current District Councillor is Liberal Democrat Lisa Spivey who was elected in the 2019 United Kingdom local elections.

Ampney Crucis is part of the wider South Cerney electoral division for elections to Gloucestershire County Council, Lisa Spivey who was elected in the 2021 United Kingdom local elections is also the County Councillor.
