= Hamelin de Ballon =

Norman nobleman in England (c. 1060–1105/6)

Location of Ballon in ancient province of Maine

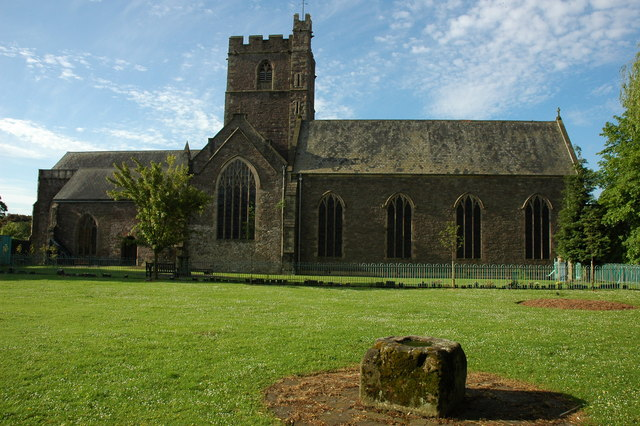
St. Mary's Priory Church, originally founded as a Benedictine priory by Hamelin de Ballo, first Baron Abergavenny.

Hamelin de Ballon (or Baalun, Baalan, Balun, Balodun, Balon, etc.) (born ca. 1060, died 5 March 1105/6) was an early Norman Baron and the first Baron Abergavenny and Lord of Over Gwent and Abergavenny; he also served William Rufus.

== Origin ==
Hamelin is traditionally made son of a Drogo (or Dru) de Ballon, lord of Ballon, today a commune in the department of Sarthe, Pays de la Loire. It was located within the medieval County of Maine, invaded and conquered by Duke William of Normandy in the early 1060s, just before his invasion of England.

== Rewards and duties ==
Hamelin de Ballon and his brother Wynebald de Ballon appear first to have come to England during the reign of William II. Wynebald was granted lands in Gloucestershire and Somerset out of those forfeited by Turstin FitzRolf, and was made seneschal of Caerleon, referring to himself as one of Henry I's most important noblemen. Hamelin was given lands in southeast Wales, in what was to become the Welsh Marches, and in Wiltshire, where he held Castle Eaton, Cheverel and Sutton. He sited the early motte and bailey version of Abergavenny Castle and organised the early Norman protection of the settlement of what became the town of Abergavenny. Together with his brother Wynebald, he also founded the Benedictine Priory in the town as an alien cell of St Vincent, Le Mans, ca. 1100. He was already a benefactor of the latter foundation.

== Succession ==
Hamelin had two sons, William de Ballon and Matthew de Ballon, both of whom predeceased him without issue. His heirs were thus his two daughters. Emmeline de Ballon married Reginald, son of Roger, Earl of Hereford. His other daughter's name is unknown, but she was the mother of Hugh de Gundeville, administrator and justiciar of king Henry II.

Hamelin was succeeded in some of the lands and the de facto title Baron Abergavenny by a favourite of king Henry I of England, Brian Fitz Count, who held it, like his other lands, in right of his wife.
