= Ballon, Sarthe =

Ballon
- Part of Ballon-Saint-Mars
- Coat of arms
- Location of Ballon
- Location within France Location within Pays de la Loire
- Coordinates: 48°10′36″N 0°14′09″E
- Country: France
- Region: Pays de la Loire
- Department: Sarthe
- Arrondissement: Le Mans
- Canton: Bonnétable
- Commune: Ballon-Saint-Mars
- Area^{1}: 13.41 km^{2} (5.18 sq mi)
- Highest elevation: 106 m (348 ft)
- Lowest elevation: 53 m (174 ft)
- Population (2018): 1,379
  - Density: 102.8/km^{2} (266.3/sq mi)
- Demonym(s): Ballonnais, Ballonnaise
- Time zone: UTC+01:00 (CET)
  - Summer (DST): UTC+02:00 (CEST)
- Postal code: 72290
- ^{1} French Land Register data, which excludes lakes, ponds, glaciers > 1 km^{2} (0.386 sq mi or 247 acres) and river estuaries.

Ballon (French pronunciation: [balɔ̃]) is a former commune in the Sarthe department in the region of Pays de la Loire in north-western France. On 1 January 2016, it was merged into the new commune of Ballon-Saint-Mars.

== See also ==
- Communes of the Sarthe department
- Château de Ballon
