= Erskine May: Parliamentary Practice =

Manual of UK Parliamentary procedure

A Treatise upon the Law, Privileges, Proceedings and Usage of Parliament
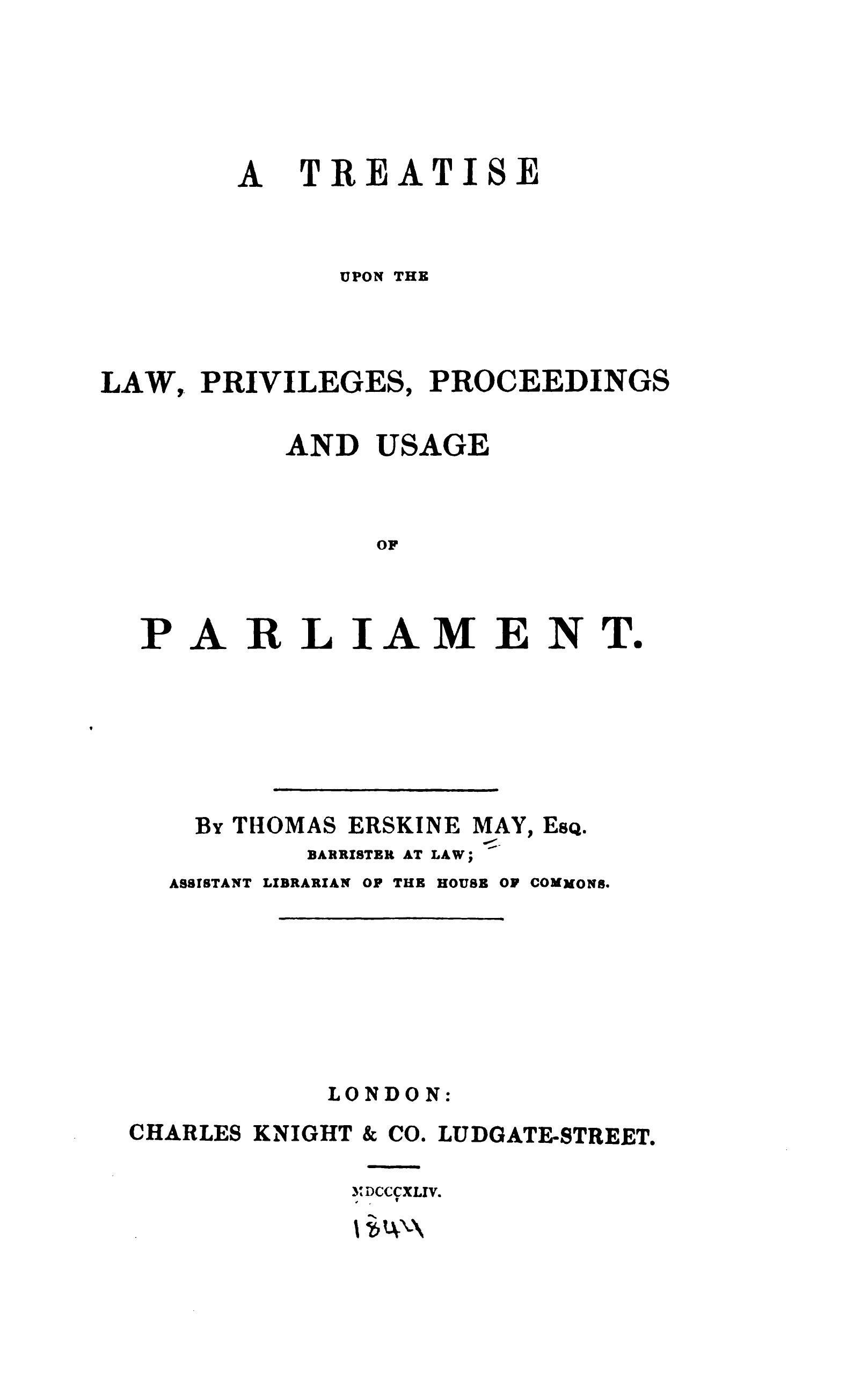
- First edition
- Author: Thomas Erskine May
- Language: English
- Subject: Great Britain – Parliament – Rules and practice
- Publisher: Charles Knight & Co
- Publication date: 1844
- Publication place: United Kingdom
- Media type: Print
- Pages: 496
- OCLC: 645178915
- Dewey Decimal: 328.41 22
- LC Class: JN594 .M24 1844
- Website: https://erskinemay.parliament.uk/

Erskine May: Parliamentary Practice Erskine May's Treatise on the Law, Privileges, Proceedings and Usage of Parliament
- 24th edition
- Author: Malcolm Jack (editor) et al
- Language: English
- Subject: Great Britain – Parliament – Rules and practice
- Publisher: LexisNexis
- Publication date: 2011
- Publication place: United Kingdom
- Media type: Print
- Pages: 1097
- ISBN: 978-1-4057-5106-3
- OCLC: 699769590
- Dewey Decimal: 328.41 22
- LC Class: KD4354 .M38 2004 (23rd ed)

Erskine May (full title: Erskine May: Parliamentary Practice, original title: A Treatise upon the Law, Privileges, Proceedings and Usage of Parliament) is a parliamentary authority originally written by British constitutional theorist and Clerk of the House of Commons, Thomas Erskine May (later the 1st Baron Farnborough).

Erskine May is considered to be the most authoritative and influential work on parliamentary procedure and the constitutional conventions affecting the Parliament of the United Kingdom, which form a major part of the uncodified British constitution. It is not a rigid set of rules but a description of how the procedure evolved and of the conventions. Such is the authority of the text that it is regarded as analogous to part of the British constitution itself.

Since its first publication in 1844, the book has frequently been updated. Erskine May edited nine editions of the book in his lifetime. Updates have continued into the present day; the 25th edition was published on 28 May 2019. The Speaker's Commission on Digital Democracy recommended in 2015 that "Erskine May, the definitive guide to parliamentary procedure, should be freely available online by the time the next edition is produced." This took effect in July 2019 with the 25th edition.

The work has been influential outside the United Kingdom, particularly in countries that use the Westminster system.

== Editions ==
Edition	Year	Editor
A Treatise upon the Law, Privileges, Proceedings and Usage of Parliament
1st	1844	Thomas Erskine May, Esq ("Barrister at Law; Assistant Librarian of the House of Commons")
A Practical Treatise on the Law, Privileges, Proceedings and Usage of Parliament
2nd	1851	Thomas Erskine May, Esq ("of the Middle Temple; Barrister-at-Law; one of the examiners of petitions for private bills, and taxing officer of the House of Commons")
3rd	1855	Thomas Erskine May, Esq (Taxing Master for both Houses of Parliament)
4th	1859	Thomas Erskine May, Esq (Clerk Assistant of the House of Commons)
A treatise on the Law, Privileges, Proceedings, and Usage of Parliament
5th	1863	Thomas Erskine May, Esq, CB (Clerk Assistant of the House of Commons)
6th	1868	Sir Thomas Erskine May, KCB (Clerk Assistant of the House of Commons)
7th	1873	Sir Thomas Erskine May, KCB (Clerk of the House of Commons)
8th	1879	Sir Thomas Erskine May, KCB, DCL (Clerk of the House of Commons)
9th	1883	Sir Thomas Erskine May, KCB, DCL (Clerk of the House of Commons)
10th	1893	Sir Reginald F. D. Palgrave (Books I and II); Alfred Bonham-Carter (Book III)
11th	1906	T. Lonsdale Webster (Books I and II); William Edward Grey (Book III)
12th	1917	T. Lonsdale Webster
13th	1924	Sir T. Lonsdale Webster
14th	1946	Sir Gilbert Campion
Sir Thomas Erskine May's Treatise on the Law, Privileges, Proceedings and Usage of Parliament
15th	1950	The Lord Campion
16th	1957	Sir Edward Fellowes; T. G. B. Cocks; The Lord Campion (editor consultant)
Erskine May’s Treatise on The Law, Privileges, Proceedings and Usage of Parliament
17th	1964	Sir Barnett Cocks
18th	1971	Sir Barnett Cocks
19th	1976	Sir David Lidderdale
20th	1983	Sir Charles Gordon
21st	1989	Sir Clifford Boulton
22nd	1997	Sir Donald Limon; William McKay
23rd	2004	Sir William McKay KCB ("formerly Clerk of the House of Commons")
24th	2011	Malcolm Jack ("Clerk of the Journals, House of Commons")
25th	2019	Sir David Natzler KCB ("Former Clerk of the House of Commons"); Mark Hutton ("Clerk of the Journals, House of Commons")

== Contents of the book ==
=== Contents of 1st edition ===
- Book I: Constitution, Powers, and Privileges of Parliament.
  - Chapter I: Preliminary view of the constituent parts of Parliament: The Crown, The Lords Spiritual and Temporal, and the Knights, Citizens, and Burgesses; with incidental reference to their ancient history and constitution.
  - Chapter II: Power and Jurisdiction of Parliament collectively. Rights and Power of each of its constituent parts.
  - Chapter III: General view of the Privileges of Parliament: Power of commitment by both Houses for Breaches of Privilege. Causes of commitment cannot be inquired into by Courts of Law; nor the prisoners admitted to bail. Acts construed as Breaches of Privilege. Different punishments inflicted by the two Houses.
  - Chapter IV: Privilege of Freedom of Speech confirmed by the ancient law of Parliament and by statute: its nature and limits.
  - Chapter V: Freedom from Arrest or Molestation: its antiquity; limits, and mode of enforcement. Privilege of not being impleaded in civil actions: of not being liable to be summoned by subpoena or to serve on juries. Commitment of Members by Courts of Justice. Privilege of witnesses and others in attendance on Parliament.
  - Chapter VI: Jurisdiction of Courts of Law in matters of Privilege.
- Book II: Practice and Proceedings in Parliament.
  - Chapter VII: Introductory remarks. Meeting of a new Parliament. Election and Royal Approbation of the Speaker of the Commons. Oaths. Queen's Speech, and Addresses in answer. Places of Peers and Members of the House of Commons. Attendance on the service of Parliament. Office of Speaker in both Houses. Principal Officers. Journals. Admission of Strangers. Prorogation.
  - Chapter VIII: Motions and Questions. Notices of Motions. Questions moved and seconded. Motions withdrawn. Questions superseded by Adjournment; or by reading the Orders of the Day. Previous Questions. New Questions substituted by Amendment. Complicated Questions. Questions put.
  - Chapter IX: Amendments to Questions; and Amendments to proposed Amendments.
  - Chapter X: The same Question or Bill may not be twice offered in a Session.
  - Chapter XI: Rules of Debate: Manner and time of speaking: Rules and orders to be observed by Members in speaking, and in attending to Debates.
  - Chapter XII: Divisions. Mode of dividing in both Houses. Proxies and Pairs. Protests. Members personally interested.
  - Chapter XIII: Committees of the whole House: General rules of proceeding: Chairman: Motions and Debate: House resumed.
  - Chapter XIV: Appointment, Constitution, Powers and Proceedings of Select Committees in both Houses.
  - Chapter XV: Witnesses: Modes of Summons and Examination: Administration of Oaths: Expenses.
  - Chapter XVI: Communications between the Lords and Commons: Messages and Conferences: Joint Committees, and Committees communicating with each other.
  - Chapter XVII: Communications from the Crown to Parliament: Their forms and character: How acknowledged: Addresses to the Crown: Messages to Members of the Royal Family; and communications from them.
  - Chapter XVIII: Proceedings of Parliament in passing Public Bills; Their several stages in both Houses. Royal Assent.
  - Chapter XIX: Ancient mode of petitioning Parliament: Form and character of modern Petitions: Practice of both Houses in receiving them.
  - Chapter XX: Accounts, Papers and Records presented to Parliament: Printing and distribution of them: Arrangement and statistical value of Parliamentary Returns.
  - Chapter XXI: Progressive influence of the Commons in granting Supplies, and imposing Burthens upon the People. Exclusion of the Lords from the right of amending Money Bills. Constitutional functions of the Crown and of the Commons, in matters of Supply. Modern rules and practice in voting Money and imposing Pecuniary Burthens. Committees of Supply and Ways and Means.
  - Chapter XXII: Issue of Writs, and Trial of Controverted Elections by the House of Commons.
  - Chapter XXIII: Impeachment by the Commons; grounds of accusation; form of charge; articles of impeachment; the trial and judgment: proceedings not concluded by prorogation or dissolution; pardon not pleadable. Trial of Peers. Bills of Attainder and of Pains and Penalties.
- Book III: The Manner of passing Private Bills.
  - Chapter XXIV: Distinctive character of Private Bills: preliminary view of the proceedings of Parliament in passing them.
  - Chapter XXV: Conditions to be observed by parties before Private Bills are introduced into Parliament: Notices and deposit of plans, &c.: Estimates and subscription contracts.
  - Chapter XXVI: Course of proceedings upon Private Bills introduced into the House of Commons; with the rules, orders, and practice applicable to each stage of such Bills in succession, and to particular classes of Bills.
  - Chapter XXVII: Course of Proceedings in the Lords upon Private Bills sent up from the Commons.
  - Chapter XXVIII: Rules, orders, and course of proceedings in the Lords upon Private Bills brought into that House upon Petition; and proceedings of the Commons upon Private Bills brought from the Lords. Local and Personal, and Private Acts of Parliament.
  - Chapter XXIX: Fees payable by the parties promoting or opposing Private Bills. Costs of Parliamentary Agents and others.

=== Contents of 24th edition ===
- Part 1: Constitution and organization of Parliament
  - Chapter 1: The constituent parts of Parliament
  - Chapter 2: Elections
  - Chapter 3: Disqualification for membership of either House
  - Chapter 4: Members and Officers of Parliament [including Payment of Members]
  - Chapter 5: Rules governing the conduct of Members of both Houses and the disclosure of financial interests
  - Chapter 6: Administration of Parliament and the Parliamentary Estate
  - Chapter 7: Parliamentary papers and publications
  - Chapter 8: A new Parliament and opening and closing of session
  - Chapter 9: Formal communications between Crown and Parliament and between Lords and Commons
  - Chapter 10: Parliament and international assemblies
- Part 2: Powers and privileges of Parliament
  - Chapter 11: Power and jurisdiction of Parliament [including Summoning of witnesses and Penal jurisdiction of both Houses]
  - Chapter 12: The privilege of Parliament
  - Chapter 13: Privilege of freedom of speech
  - Chapter 14: Privilege of freedom from arrest
  - Chapter 15: Contempts
  - Chapter 16: Complaints of breach of privilege or contempt
  - Chapter 17: The courts and parliamentary privilege
- Part 3: Conduct of business
  - Chapter 18: A sitting: general arrangements in the House of Commons
  - Chapter 19: The control and distribution of time in the House of Commons
  - Chapter 20: Outline of the business of the House of Commons
  - Chapter 21: The process of debate in the House of Commons by motion, question and decision
  - Chapter 22: Maintenance of order during debates in the House of Commons
  - Chapter 23: Methods of curtailing debate
  - Chapter 24: Public petitions
  - Chapter 25: Organization and conduct of business in the House of Lords
- Part 4: Public legislation
  - Chapter 26: Preliminary view of public bills [including Pre-legislative scrutiny]
  - Chapter 27: Proceedings on public bills in the House of Commons [including Committee of the whole House]
  - Chapter 28: Proceedings on public bills in the House of Lords
  - Chapter 29: Proceedings on public bills: matters affecting both Houses [including ping-pong and Parliament Acts]
  - Chapter 30: Delegated legislation
  - Chapter 31: Parliamentary oversight of European Union matters
- Part 5: Financial procedure
  - Chapter 32: Financial procedure – general
  - Chapter 33: Public expenditure and Supply
  - Chapter 34: Expenditure: Money resolutions
  - Chapter 35: Ways and Means and Finance Bills
  - Chapter 36: The role of the House of Lords in financial procedure
- Part 6: Committees
  - Chapter 37: Select committees in the House of Commons
  - Chapter 38: General committees in the House of Commons
  - Chapter 39: Select committees in the House of Lords
  - Chapter 40: Joint committees of the Lords and Commons
- Part 7: Private legislation
  - Chapter 41: Preliminary view of private bills
  - Chapter 42: Preliminary proceedings in both Houses on private bills
  - Chapter 43: Petitions in favour of, against, or relating to private bills in the House of Commons; and the Court of Referees
  - Chapter 44: Proceedings in the House of Commons on private bills
  - Chapter 45: Proceedings on private and personal bills in the House of Lords

== See also ==
- Cabinet Manual (United Kingdom)
