= Malcolm Jack =

Clerk of the House of Commons

- Born: 17 December 1946 (age 79)

Sir Malcolm Roy Jack KCB (born 17 December 1946) was the Clerk of the House of Commons of the United Kingdom from 2006 to 2011. He began service with the House of Commons in 1967. He was appointed Principal Clerk in 1991 and served as secretary to the House of Commons Commission from 1995 to 2001. He then served as Clerk of the Journals (2001–03) and Clerk of Legislation (2003–06) before being appointed Clerk of the House of Commons in 2006. While in this office he was the editor of the 24th edition of Erskine May: Parliamentary Practice (2011).

As an author on history and philosophy he has published: Corruption and Progress: the Eighteenth-Century Debate (1989), William Beckford: An English Fidalgo (1997), Sintra: A Glorious Eden (2002) and Lisbon: City of the Sea (2007) as well as essays, articles and reviews in learned and literary journals in the UK, USA and South Africa.

He lectures at various universities in the UK, USA and Europe and was visiting professor of Enlightenment Studies at Nanyang Technological University, Singapore in 2015.

He was elected a fellow of the Society of Antiquaries in 2012, President of the Beckford Society in 2015 and President of the Johnson Club in 2016.

He was succeeded by Robert Rogers on 1 October 2011.

Jack was appointed Knight Commander of the Order of the Bath (KCB) in the 2011 Birthday Honours.

Government offices
Preceded by Roger Sands	Clerk of the House of Commons; 2006–2011	Succeeded by Robert Rogers
