= Kenneth Bradshaw =

Sir Kenneth Bradshaw KCB

43rd Clerk of the House of Commons
- In office 1983–1987
- Preceded by: Sir Charles Gordon
- Succeeded by: Clifford Boulton

Sir Kenneth Anthony Bradshaw KCB (1 September 1922 – 31 October 2007) was Clerk of the House of Commons in the United Kingdom from 1983 to 1987.

He was educated at Ampleforth College, then St Catharine's College, Cambridge.

Bradshaw was appointed Clerk Assistant of the House of Commons in 1979, and promoted to Clerk in 1983.

Bradshaw was appointed a Companion of the Order of the Bath (CB) in the 1982 Birthday Honours, and promoted to Knight Commander of the Order (KCB) in the 1986 New Year Honours.
