= Erskine May =

British official and constitutional theorist (1815–1886)

The Right Honourable The Lord Farnborough KCB, PC
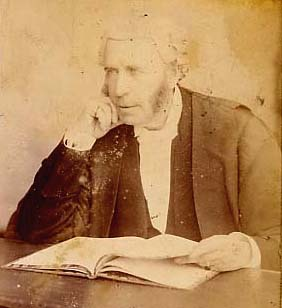

Under Clerk of the Parliaments
- In office 16 February 1871 – 17 April 1886
- Monarch: Victoria
- Preceded by: Sir Denis Le Marchant, Bt
- Succeeded by: Sir Reginald Palgrave

Member of the House of Lords; Lord Temporal
- Life peerage 11 May 1886 – 17 May 1886

Personal details
- Born: Thomas Erskine May; 8 February 1815 Highgate, Middlesex, England, United Kingdom
- Died: 17 May 1886 (aged 71) St George Hanover Square, Middlesex, England, United Kingdom

Thomas Erskine May, 1st Baron Farnborough, KCB, PC (8 February 1815 – 17 May 1886) was a British constitutional theorist and Clerk of the House of Commons during the Victorian era.

His seminal work, A Treatise upon the Law, Privileges, Proceedings and Usage of Parliament (first published in 1844) has become known as Erskine May: Parliamentary Practice or simply Erskine May. This parliamentary authority (book of procedural rules) is currently in its 25th revised edition (2019) and is informally considered part of the constitution of the United Kingdom.

Following his retirement as Clerk of the House of Commons in May 1886, May was created "Baron Farnborough, of Farnborough, in the county of Southampton" just a week before his death. Since he left no heirs, the barony became extinct, making it the second-shortest-lived peerage in British history.

== Biography ==
Thomas Erskine May was born in Highgate, Middlesex, on 8 February 1815. He was christened on 21 September 1815 at St Martin-in-the-Fields, Westminster with his parents being registered as Thomas and Sarah May. He was educated at Bedford School.

May began his parliamentary service in 1831, at the age of 16, as Assistant Librarian in the House of Commons Library. He was admitted to the Middle Temple on 20 June 1834 and called to the bar on 4 May 1838. May married Johanna Laughton, of Fareham, on 27 August 1839. May became examiner of petitions for private bills in 1846 and from 1847 to 1856 was Taxing Master for both Houses of Parliament. In 1856 he became Clerk Assistant of the House of Commons.

May was appointed a Companion of the Order of the Bath (CB) on 16 May 1860 and promoted to Knight Commander (KCB) on 6 July 1866. On 16 February 1871, he was appointed Clerk of the House of Commons by letters patent.

In 1873, he was elected a bencher of the Middle Temple and awarded an honorary Doctorate of Civil Law by the University of Oxford in 1874. In 1880, he was made a Reader of the Middle Temple and sworn of the Privy Council in 1884.

On 10 May 1886, shortly after his retirement as Clerk of the House of Commons, May was created "Baron Farnborough, of Farnborough, in the county of Southampton". He died just a week later on 17 May 1886. Since he left no heirs, the barony became extinct, making it the second-shortest-lived peerage in British history, after the Barony of Leighton.

Sir William McKay, who edited Erskine May's private journal, has suggested that May was possibly an unacknowledged son or grandson of The 1st Baron Erskine.

== Notable works ==
May's most famous work, A Treatise upon the Law, Privileges, Proceedings and Usage of Parliament (now popularly known as Erskine May: Parliamentary Practice or simply Erskine May), was first published in 1844. The book is currently in its 25th edition (2019). It is informally considered part of the constitution of the United Kingdom. The guide is authoritative in many Commonwealth nations, often with strong influence on constitutional convention.

Another notable work is The Constitutional History of England since the Accession of George III, 1760–1860. May's work was disputed by some later historians, such as Herbert Butterfield who wrote, "Erskine May must be a good example of the way in which an historian may fall into error through an excess of brilliance. His capacity for synthesis, and his ability to dovetail the various parts of the evidence ... carried him into a more profound and complicated elaboration of error than some of his more pedestrian predecessors ... he inserted a doctrinal element into his history which, granted his original aberrations, was calculated to project the lines of his error, carrying his work still further from centrality or truth."
