= Carolyn Hill (disambiguation) =

Carolyn Hill is a golfer.

Carolyn or Caroline Hill may also refer to:

- Carly Hill, Canadian ice hockey player
- Carolyn Hill (Under the Dome), fictional character
- Caroline Hill, English actress
- Caroline S. Hill, British scientist
- Caroline Hill, a hill near So Kon Po, Hong Kong Island
