= Robert Rogers, Baron Lisvane =

Clerk of the House of Commons

The Right Honourable The Lord Lisvane KCB DL FLSW
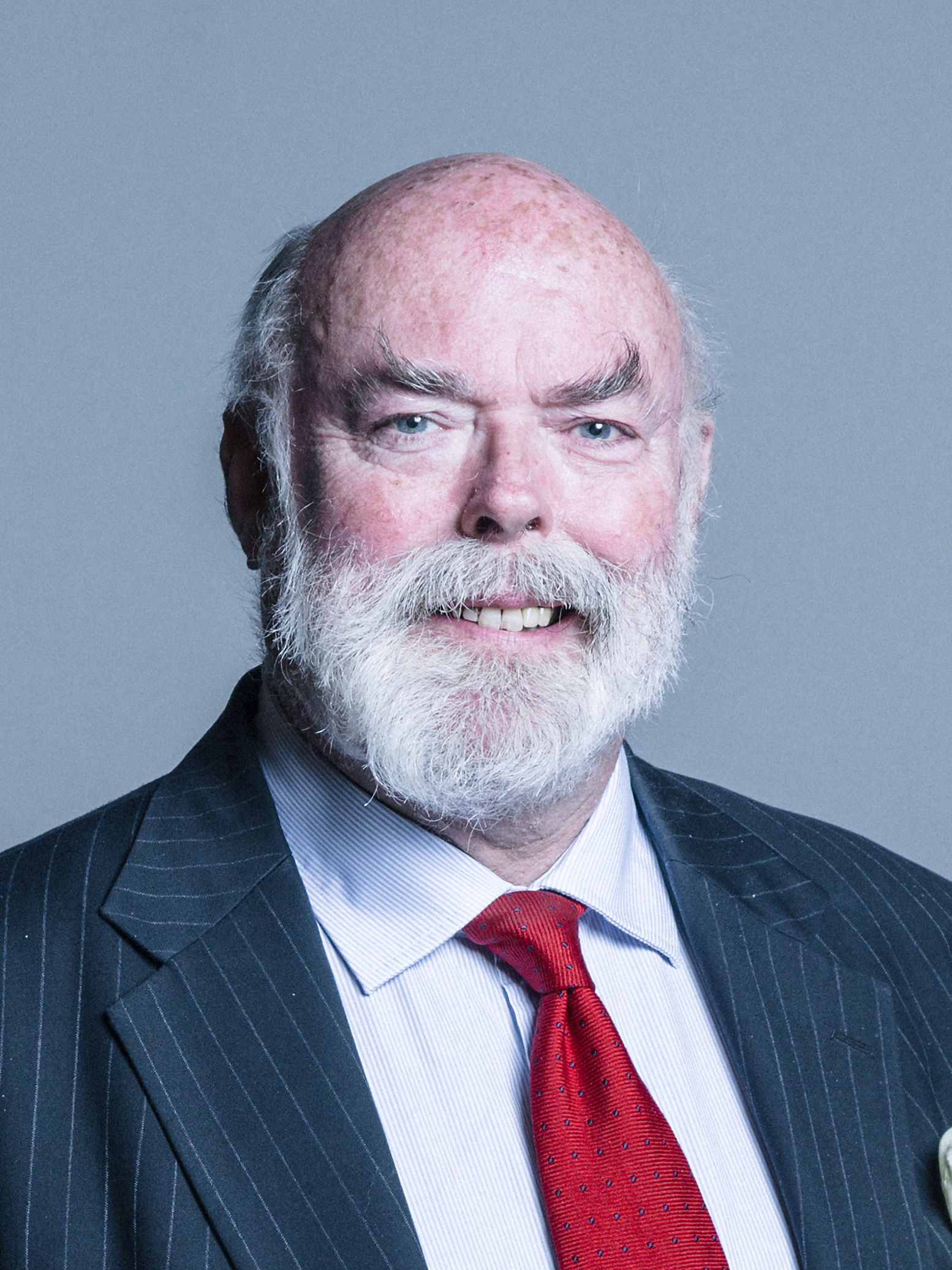
- Official portrait, 2016

Member of the House of Lords
- Lord Temporal
- Life peerage 11 December 2014

49th Clerk of the House of Commons
- In office 1 October 2011 – 31 August 2014
- Preceded by: Malcolm Jack
- Succeeded by: David Natzler

Personal details
- Born: Robert James Rogers; 5 February 1950 (age 76) Cardiff, Glamorgan, Wales
- Party: Crossbencher
- Spouses: Sarah Elizabeth Anne Howard (m. 1973; div. 1978); Constance Jane Perkins (m. 1981)
- Children: 2
- Education: Tonbridge School
- Alma mater: Lincoln College, Oxford

Robert James Rogers, Baron Lisvane, KCB, DL, FLSW (born 5 February 1950) is a British life peer and retired public servant. He served as Clerk of the House of Commons from October 2011 until August 2014.

Following his elevation as a Life Peer in 2014, Lord Lisvane sits as a crossbencher in the House of Lords.

He is also a member of the Steering Committee of the Constitution Reform Group (CRG), a cross-party organisation which is chaired by Robert Gascoyne-Cecil, 7th Marquess of Salisbury which seeks a new constitutional settlement in the UK by way of a new Act of Union. Lord Lisvane introduced the Act of Union Bill 2018 as a private member's bill in the House of Lords on 9 October 2018, when it received a formal first reading. The BBC suggested that the issues addressed by the Bill were likely to become important in the 2019 Parliament.

== Early life ==
Born in Cardiff, Rogers attended Tonbridge School before going to Lincoln College, Oxford, where he studied Old Norse, Old English, and medieval Welsh, as well as representing the University of Oxford at cricket, hockey, and real tennis. He captained Lincoln College in the series of University Challenge broadcast in 1970, reaching the semi-final.

He was a Rhodes Research Scholar in 1971 and worked briefly at the Ministry of Defence before entering parliamentary service in the House of Commons.

== Parliament career ==
=== House of Commons ===
Rogers joined the House of Commons Service in 1972 and was involved in every aspect of the procedural and committee work of Parliament during his career, including postings as Clerk for Private Members' Bills, Clerk to the Defence Select Committee, Clerk of the European Scrutiny Committee, Secretary of the House of Commons Commission, Clerk of Select Committees, Clerk of the Journals (2004–2005), Principal Clerk of the Table Office (2005–2006), and Clerk of Legislation (2006–2009). He was Clerk Assistant and Director General, Chamber and Committee Services from 2009 to 2011. He succeeded Sir Malcolm Jack as Clerk of the House of Commons on 1 October 2011.

On 30 April 2014, Rogers announced his intention to retire at the end of August that year. At the date of his retirement he had served for over four decades in the House of Commons, including more than ten years as a Clerk at the Table.

=== House of Lords ===
On 21 October 2014, it was announced that Rogers was to be raised to the peerage, having been nominated personally by Prime Minister David Cameron. He was created a life peer on 11 December 2014, taking the title Baron Lisvane, of Blakemere in the County of Herefordshire and of Lisvane in the City and County of Cardiff.

Lord Lisvane sits in the House of Lords as a crossbencher. He made his maiden speech on 1 June 2015. He is a member of the House of Lords Committee on Delegated Powers and Regulatory Reform, and of the Ecclesiastical Committee. He is an independent vice-president of the Local Government Association.

== Personal life and other posts ==
Rogers has been independent chairman of local government standards committees, a police authority and a fire and rescue authority. He was Chairman of the Hereford Cathedral Perpetual Trust and a member of the Cathedral Council (2007–09). In 2016 Lord Lisvane undertook an independent review to examine the functioning of the branches of Tynwald, the Isle of Man parliament, and to consider options for reform.

On 22 January 2020, Lord Lisvane submitted a formal complaint to the Parliamentary Commissioner for Standards against former Commons Speaker John Bercow.

He is co-author of the standard textbook How Parliament Works, as of 2018 in its eighth edition, and author of two parliamentary miscellanies: Order! Order! (2010) and Who Goes Home? (2012).

He is married to Jane, who was ordained as a deacon in the Church of England on 30 June 2013 and as a priest on 27 September 2014; they have two daughters: Catherine, a solicitor, and Eleanor, who works in public health research. Jane was the High Sheriff of Herefordshire 2017–18.

Lord Lisvane's recreations are sailing, shooting, cricket, music (he is a church organist) and country pursuits.

== Honours ==
Rogers was appointed Knight Commander of the Order of the Bath (KCB) in the 2013 New Year Honours for "parliamentary and public service". He was appointed a Deputy Lieutenant for Herefordshire in April 2015.

Rogers was elected to an honorary fellowship of Lincoln College, Oxford, in 2012, and as an honorary bencher of the Middle Temple in 2013. He is also a Freeman of the City of London, a liveryman and Past Master of the Skinners' Company. In October 2016, he was appointed to the ancient office of Chief Steward of the City of Hereford.

In 2018, he was elected a Fellow of the Learned Society of Wales.

Government offices
| Preceded by Sir Malcolm Jack | Clerk of the House of Commons; 2011–2014 | Succeeded by Sir David Natzler |
Orders of precedence in the United Kingdom
| Preceded by The Lord Evans of Weardale | Gentlemen; Baron Lisvane | Followed by The Lord Hay of Ballyore |
