= Thomas Lonsdale Webster =

British civil servant

Clerk of the House of Commons
- In office 1921–1930
- Preceded by: Courtenay Ilbert
- Succeeded by: Horace Dawkins

Personal details
- Born: 1868
- Died: 1930 (aged 61–62)

Sir Thomas Lonsdale Webster KCB (1868–1930) was a British civil servant who served as a clerk in the Parliament of the United Kingdom.

Webster entered public service as a clerk in the General Post Office in 1887.

He was appointed a Companion of the Order of the Bath in the 1912 Birthday Honours. Webster served as Clerk of the House of Commons from 1921 until his death in 1930. He was appointed a Knight Commander of the Order of the Bath in the 1922 Birthday Honours.

He was the father of the classicist T. B. L. Webster.
