= John Ley =

John Ley may refer to:

- John Ley (clergyman), English clergyman and member of the Westminster Assembly
- John Ley (politician), member of the Washington House of Representatives
- John Henry Ley, English civil servant
