= House of Commons Commission Act 2015 =

Act of the Parliament of the United Kingdom

House of Commons Commission Act 2015 (Note: Section 3(6).)
- Act of Parliament
- Parliament of the United Kingdom
- Long title: An Act to amend the House of Commons (Administration) Act 1978 so as to make provision about the membership of the House of Commons Commission, so as to confer a new strategic function on the Commission, and so as to make provision about the exercise of functions on behalf of the Commission or its members.
- Citation: 2015 c. 24
- Introduced by: William Hague (Commons); Lord Wallace of Saltaire (Lords)
- Territorial extent: United Kingdom (Note: Section 3(5).)

Dates
- Royal assent: 26 March 2015
- Commencement: 26 March 2015 (section 3); Various (rest of act); (Note: Section 3(1)–(4).)
Other legislation
Amends	House of Commons (Administration) Act 1978

Status: Current legislation

History of passage through Parliament

Text of statute as originally enacted

Revised text of statute as amended

The House of Commons Commission Act 2015 (c. 24) is an act of the Parliament of the United Kingdom which amends the House of Commons (Administration) Act 1978 to add functions and change the membership of the House of Commons Commission.

== Provisions ==
=== Section 1 - Members of the Commission etc. ===
This section adds five new members to the existing Commission of six MPs: one extra Member of Parliament and four non-Members.

Subsection (4) specifies that the official members are the Clerk of the House of Commons and the Director General of the House of Commons, a new position recommended by the Governance Committee. The subsection allows the Commission to appoint other House officials if either of these posts is vacant.

=== Section 2 - Functions of the Commission ===
This section gives the Commission specific statuary powers of setting strategic priorities and objectives for services provided by the House Departments.
