= Courtenay Ilbert =

British lawyer and civil servant

Sir Courtenay Ilbert GCB KCSI CIE FBA
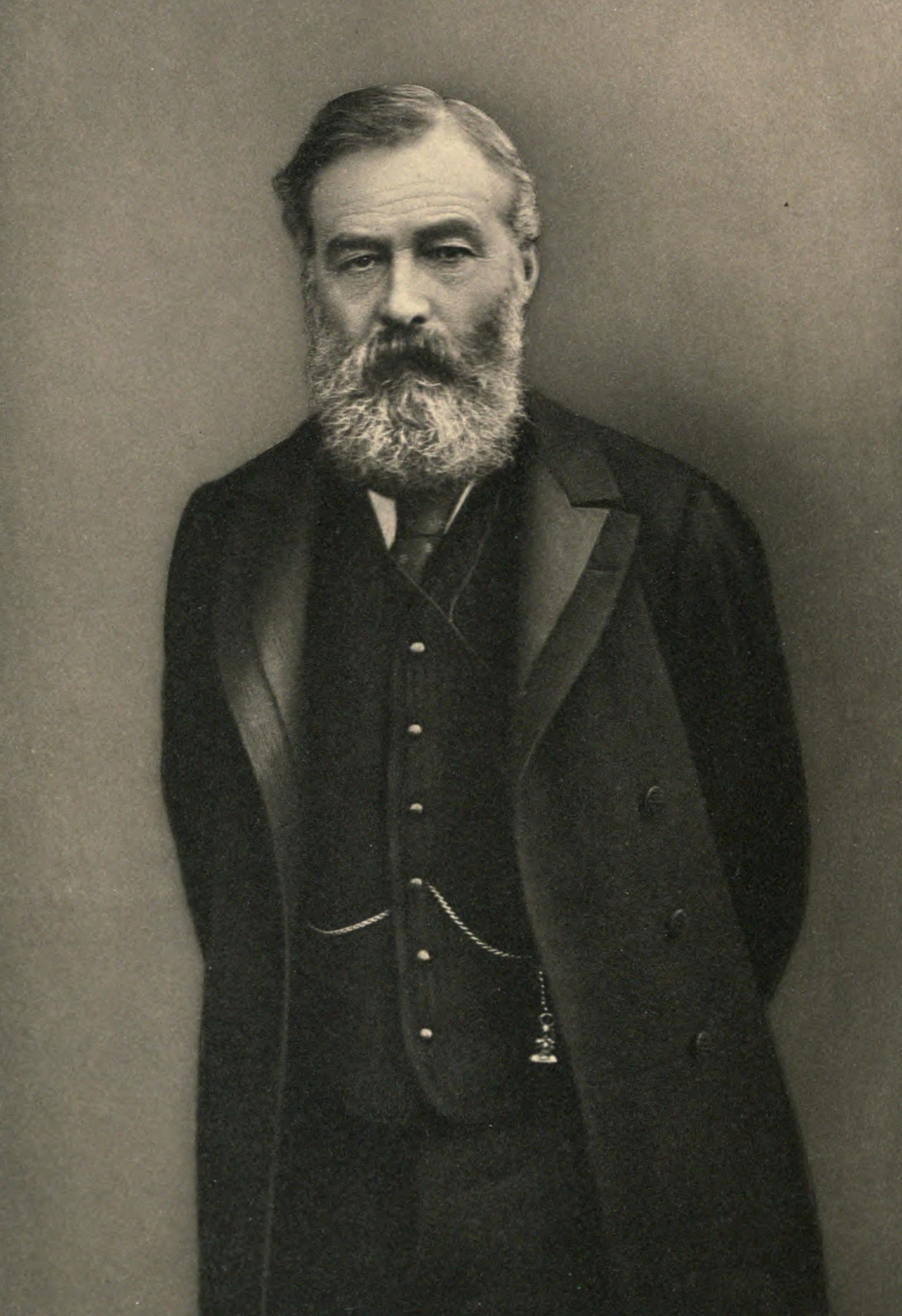

33rd Clerk of the House of Commons
- In office 1902–1921
- Preceded by: Archibald Milman
- Succeeded by: Thomas Lonsdale Webster

First Parliamentary Counsel
- In office 1899–1902
- Preceded by: Henry Thring, 1st Baron Thring
- Succeeded by: Henry Jenkyns

Personal details
- Born: 12 June 1841 Kingsbridge, England, United Kingdom of Great Britain and Ireland
- Died: 14 May 1924 (aged 82) Penn, Buckinghamshire, England, United Kingdom of Great Britain and Ireland
- Relatives: Lettice Fisher (daughter) Mary Bennett (grand-daughter)
- Education: Balliol College, Oxford
- Occupation: Lawyer, Civil servant
- Known for: Ilbert Bill; Legislative Methods and Forms

Sir Courtenay Peregrine Ilbert, GCB, KCSI, CIE, FBA (12 June 1841 – 14 May 1924) was a distinguished British lawyer and civil servant who served as legal adviser to the Viceroy of India's Council for many years until his eventual return from India to England. His later career included appointments as the First Parliamentary Counsel (1899–1902) and as Clerk of the House of Commons from 1902 to 1921.

== Biography ==
=== Early life and career ===
Ilbert was born at Kingsbridge, Devon to the Reverend Peregrine Arthur Ilbert, rector of Thurlestone, and Rose Anne (daughter of George Welsh Owen, of Lowman Green, Tiverton, Devon). He was educated at Marlborough College (1852–60) and at Balliol College, Oxford, where he won the Hertford, Ireland, Craven, and Eldon scholarships. He took first-class honours in classical moderations and literae humaniores and was elected a fellow of Balliol in 1864, where he was Bursar from 1871 to 1874. He was President of the Oxford Union in Michaelmas 1865.

=== Legal career ===
Ilbert was called to the Bar by Lincoln's Inn in 1869, and began to practice in property law, with an emphasis on drafting trusts and other documents. His expertise as a draftsman attracted the attention of Sir Henry Thring who invited him to help prepare bills: among his bills he helped to prepare were the Statute Law Revision and Civil Procedure Act 1881 (44 & 45 Vict. c. 59) and the Statute Law Revision and Civil Procedure Act 1883 (46 & 47 Vict. c. 49).

The Viceroy of India, the Marquess of Ripon sought an imaginative constitutional lawyer and a Liberal to become the Law Member of the Viceroy's Council, in succession to the likes of Lord Macaulay, Sir Henry Maine, and Sir James Fitzjames Stephen. At the invitation of Lord Hartington, Secretary of State for India, Ilbert was offered the position in 1882 and proceeded to India, where he served until 1886.

During his time in India, Ilbert drafted many important pieces of legislation, but by far the most famous was his eponymous Ilbert Bill. Introduced by Ilbert in 1883, the Bill proposed to allow non-European Magistrates or Sessions Judges to try "European British subjects", something which existing legislation did not allow. European reactions in India to the proposal were extremely hostile, which in turn stimulated the growth of Indian nationalism. The response in Britain was more divided: the Bill was criticized by some, notably by Ilbert's predecessor Sir James Fitzjames Stephen, but the Bill received substantial support in Britain as well. As a result of the controversy, the bill was significantly amended. The extent of Ilbert's personal support for the Bill are unclear: R. C. J. Cocks speculated that Ilbert approved of the principles the Bill embodied, but was dubious as to its political expediency.

He was appointed assistant parliamentary counsel to Treasury in 1886 and First Parliamentary Counsel in 1899. In February 1902, Ilbert was appointed Clerk of the House of Commons, and he served as such until 1921.

=== Personal life ===
Ilbert married Jessie, daughter of Reverend Charles Bradley and niece of George Bradley, former headmaster of Marlborough College in 1874. They had five daughters, the oldest, Lettice Fisher became the first to head the National Council for the Unmarried Mother and her Child. His fourth daughter Margaret Peregrina Ilbert (1882–1952) married Sir Arthur Cochrane of the College of Arms.

Ilbert was an outdoorsman in his youth and he climbed in Chamonix (1871 with Leslie Stephen and M. Loppe) the Hekla in Iceland and the Vignemale in the Pyrenees in 1872–73 with James Bryce. When Ilbert lived in Simla, at Chapslee house, he founded a Simla Natural History Society around 1885 but the organization dissolved when he left Simla in 1886.

Ilbert died a few months after the death of his wife at his home in Troutwells, Buckinghamshire on 14 May 1924.

== Honours ==
Ilbert was invested as a Knight Commander of the Order of the Star of India in 1895, as a Knight Commander of the Order of the Bath in 1908, and as a Knight Grand Cross of the Order of the Bath in 1911. He was a founding Fellow of the British Academy (1903).

== Published works ==
Ilbert reflected on laws and law-making and wrote several books on parliamentary and legislative procedure and history that were highly regarded. Jurists like Sir Carleton Kemp Allen praised his knowledge of parliamentary procedure but felt he was outdated. He pointed out to how government initiatives were modified into legally actionable forms but manyconsidered Ilbert to be outdated and old-fashioned in putting faith in public opinion to exert corrective action on legislative abuses.

- Ilbert, Courtenay (1901). Legislative Methods and Forms. Oxford: Henry Frowde.
- Ilbert, Courtenay (1904). Montesquieu. Oxford: Clarendon Press. The 1904 Romanes Lecture.
- Ilbert, Courtenay (1911). Parliament: Its History, Constitution and Practice (1 ed.). London: Williams and Norgate. 2nd ed, 1920. 3rd ed, Oxford, 1948.
- Ilbert, Courtenay (1912). Methods of Legislation (1 ed.). University of London Press.
- Ilbert, Courtenay (1914). The Mechanics of Law Making. New York: Columbia University Press.
- Ilbert, Courtenay (1922). The Government of India. Oxford University Press.
- Ilbert, Courtenay; Meston, James (1923). The New Constitution of India. University of London Press.

Legal offices
Preceded by Henry Jenkyns	First Parliamentary Counsel; 1899–1901	Succeeded by Sir Mackenzie Dalzell Chalmers
