= Thomas Goldsmith =

Thomas Goldsmith may refer to:

- Thomas Goldsmith, the 1406 MP for Derby
- Thomas Goldsmith (pirate) (died 1714), pirate and privateer from Dartmouth
- Thomas T. Goldsmith Jr. (1910–2009), chief of research for DuMont Laboratories, co-inventor of an early arcade game and professor of physics
- Thomas F. Goldsmith, American politician, mayor of Easton, Pennsylvania
- Tom Goldsmith, British parliamentary official and Clerk of the House of Commons
- Tumbleweed Tommy (Thomas Goldsmith), former member of the band Riders in the Sky
