= Gilbert Campion, 1st Baron Campion =

Clerk of the House of Commons

Gilbert Francis Montriou Campion, 1st Baron Campion, GCB (11 May 1882 – 6 April 1958), known as Sir Gilbert Campion between 1937 and 1950, was a British civil servant. He served as Clerk of the House of Commons from 1937 to 1948.

== Background and education ==
Campion was born on 11 May 1882 in Simla, British Raj, to John Montriou Campion and Grace Hannah (née Anderson). He was educated at Bedford School, an all-boys public school in Bedford, Bedfordshire, England. Having been awarded a scholarship, he studied literae humaniores (classics) at Hertford College, Oxford. He graduated with a double first Bachelor of Arts (BA) degree in 1905.

== Career ==
Campion served in the First World War in the Royal Army Service Corps, British Army. He was promoted to temporary lieutenant on 1 December 1914, and to temporary captain on 1 August 1915. In 1917, he was injured in France. On 15 June 1917, he relinquished his British Army commission on account of ill health, and was granted the honorary rank of captain.

Having been invalided from the army, he was appointed secretary to the conference on reform of the House of Lords headed by James Bryce, 1st Viscount Bryce. On 4 April 1921, he was appointed the Second Clerk Assistant of the House of Commons and was promoted to be Clerk Assistant on 28 October 1930, a post he held until 1937.

== Honours ==
In the 1932 New Year Honours, he was appointed to the Order of the Bath as a Companion (CB). On 31 July 1937 Campion was promoted to be the Under Clerk of the Parliaments. He was the editor of the 14th and 15th editions of Erskine May: Parliamentary Practice.

Campion was appointed a Knight Commander of the Order of the Bath in the 1938 New Year Honours (KCB).

He was appointed to be a Knight Grand Cross (GCB) in the 1948 Birthday Honours and retired that year as Under Clerk of the Parliaments, when he was replaced by Frederic Metcalfe CB. In the 1950 Birthday Honours, his barony for "public services" was announced and he was raised to the peerage as Baron Campion, of Bowes in the County of Surrey.

== Family ==
Campion married Hilda Mary, daughter of W. A. Spafford, in 1920. They had no children. He died in April 1958, aged 75, when the barony became extinct.

== Arms ==
Coat of arms of Gilbert Campion, 1st Baron Campion
Crest Issuant from a crest coronet Or a talbot's head Sable charged on the neck with a chevron cottised Gold. Escutcheon Argent a chevron cottised between three talbots' heads erased Sable. Supporters Dexter a lion Azure charged on the shoulder with a portcullis chained Or; sinister a lion Gules charged on the shoulder with a lotus flower also Or. Orders Order of the Bath (not pictured)

Government offices
Preceded by Sir Horace Dawkins	Clerk of the House of Commons; 1937–1948	Succeeded by Sir Frederic Metcalfe
Peerage of the United Kingdom
New creation	Baron Campion; 1950–1958	Extinct
