= Jean Thomas (biochemist) =

British biochemist and academic

Dame Jean Thomas DBE FRS FMedSci MAE FLSW

Chancellor of Swansea University
- Incumbent
- Assumed office 2018
- Preceded by: Rhodri Morgan

38th Master of St Catharine's College, Cambridge
- In office 2007–2016
- Preceded by: David Ingram
- Succeeded by: Mark Welland

Personal details
- Born: Jean Olwen Thomas; 1942 (age 83–84)
- Occupation: Biochemist
- Scientific career
- Education: University College of Swansea
- Awards: EMBO Member
- Workplaces: University of Cambridge; MRC Laboratory of Molecular Biology
- Thesis: Hydroxyl-carbonyl interaction in cyclic peptides and depsipeptides (1969)
- Doctoral students: Caroline S. Hill
- Website: www.caths.cam.ac.uk/directory/professor-dame-jean-thomas

Dame Jean Olwen Thomas (born 1 October 1942) is a Welsh biochemist, former Master of St Catharine's College, Cambridge, and Chancellor of Swansea University.

== Early life and education ==
Thomas was born in Treboeth, Swansea to John Robert and Lorna (née Harris) Thomas, and she attended Llwyn-y-Bryn High School for Girls. She continued her education at University College of Swansea where she received a first class Bachelor of Science degree in chemistry in 1964 followed by a PhD in 1967. Her thesis was on Hydroxyl-carbonyl interaction in cyclic peptides and depsipeptides.

== Career and research ==
After her PhD in 1967, Thomas remained with Cambridge at Darwin College until 1969. During this time, she held a Beit Memorial Fellowship for Medical Research at the Medical Research Council (MRC) Laboratory of Molecular Biology (LMB), a lab dedicated to understanding biological processes in order to solve major problems in human disease. She then served as a member of the university academic staff as well as a Fellow of New Hall, now Murray Edwards College, where she acted as vice president from 1983 to 1987. In 1985, during her time as vice president of New Hall, she received her degree of Doctor of Science from the University of Cambridge.

Thomas is a professor emerita of macromolecular biochemistry at Cambridge and has been a professor there since 1991. She acted as chairman of the Cambridge Centre for Molecular Recognition between 1993 and 2003. In 2007, Thomas became a fellow of St. Catharine's College, and in 2016, she became an honorary fellow. She was elected as the 38th master of St. Catharine's College in 2007, making her the first female master since the college was founded in 1473. Elected by the president and fellows of the college, she remained master until 2016, when she was succeeded by Professor Sir Mark Welland. A scholarship fund called the Jean Thomas PhD Award was created in her honour by alumnus of St. Catharine's Peter Dawson. It grants one fully funded PhD studentship per year to a student at St. Catharine's.

Her other contributions to external organizations include serving on the Science and Engineering Research Council, the Council of the Royal Society, the Engineering and Physical Sciences Research Council, the Scientific Advisory Committee of the Lister Institute of Preventive Medicine, and the Scientific Advisory Committee of the Imperial Cancer Research Fund. Starting in 1994, she served as a trustee of the British Museum for ten years. In October 2000, she became a governor of the Wellcome Trust, the world's largest biomedical research charity. In 2002 she was elected a Fellow of the Academy of Medical Sciences (FMedSci) and she is also a Fellow of the Learned Society of Wales (FLSW). Between 2000 and 2005, she served as president of the Biochemical Society and was granted honorary membership of that body in 2008. The Wolfson Foundation, an independent charity that supports excellence in science and education, appointed her as a trustee in November 2013. In 2014, Thomas was elected as the second President of the Royal Society of Biology, succeeding Nancy Rothwell of the University of Manchester. In 2018 she was appointed Chancellor of Swansea University.

In addition to the many positions she has held, Thomas became an honorary fellow of the University of Wales Swansea in 1987 and of Cardiff University in 1998. She was also granted honorary doctorates in science from the University of Wales in 1992 and from the University of East Anglia in 2002. In 2009, she was made an honorary fellow of Aberystwyth University in recognition of her distinguished career as a Welsh scientist.

=== Work in biochemistry ===
Her career as a biochemist has been heavily focused on studying the structure and dynamics of chromatin and its role in the repression and activation of genes via regulatory proteins. She was the first person to isolate and characterize the histone octamer, which ultimately and led to the universal nucleosome model for chromatin structure formulated by Roger D. Kornberg. Kornberg would eventually be awarded the Nobel Prize in Chemistry for his work on gene transcription and translation.

Thomas's recent work has focused on the in-depth understanding of chromatin proteins, such as high-mobility group box 1 protein (HMGB1) and histone H1, and their interactions with DNA. In 2007, her research team used NMR mapping to better define the negative regulation of the HMGB1-DNA interaction that was suspected to be largely controlled by the acidic tail of HMGB1. They found that regardless of the length of the acidic tail, it makes extensive contacts with the DNA-binding regions of the two tandem HMG-boxes in HMGB1. A year later, she published a paper describing the opposing effects of H1 and HMGB1 on the nucleosome. Histone H1 was shown to stabilize the structure by winding two turns of linker DNA around the octamer while HMGB1 destabilized the nucleosome by bending adjacent DNA. NMR spectroscopy was again used to show that H1 binds to the acidic tail of HMGB1 via its basic C-terminus, thus halting the HMGB1-DNA interaction. She later described the structure of these interactions as collapsed and sandwich-like, suggesting that it is important for the dynamic activity of the DNA-binding proteins.

Thomas also found that HMGB1 plays a role as a chaperone in the binding of transcription factors like p53 to DNA. In 2012, again using NMR spectroscopy, her team solved the structure of the A-box/p53 complex formed by the interaction between the N-terminus of p53 and a single HMG-box of HMGB1. Recently, she studied proteins from Drosophila melanogaster and maize that are analogous to HMGB1 in order to describe a simpler, general mechanism of the self-inhibitive behavior of the DNA-binding regions of the HMG-boxes in HMGB1. She currently continues to lead a team of researchers in the Department of Biochemistry at the University of Cambridge.

=== Awards and honours ===
Outside of her direct involvement at Cambridge, Thomas has received numerous awards and honours throughout her career. In 1982, she was elected as a member of the European Molecular Biology Organization (EMBO), and in 1986 she was elected a Fellow of the Royal Society (FRS). She served as the biological secretary and vice-president of the Royal Society for five years beginning in 2008. She became a member of the Academia Europaea (MAE) in 1991, which aims to promote learning, education, and research. She was appointed Commander of the Most Excellent Order of the British Empire (CBE) in 1993, and in 2005 she was appointed Dame Commander of the Most Excellent Order of the British Empire (DBE) in the New Year's Honours List for her services to biochemistry.

Academic offices
Preceded by David Ingram	Master of St Catharine's College, Cambridge; 2007–2016	Succeeded by Sir Mark Welland
Preceded by Nancy Rothwell	President of the Royal Society of Biology; 2014–present	Incumbent
