= Edward Fellowes (parliamentary official) =

British politician and WWII officer (1895–1970)

Sir Edward Fellowes KCB CMG MC

Clerk of the House of Commons
- In office 1954–1961
- Preceded by: Sir Frederic Metcalfe
- Succeeded by: Sir Barnett Cocks

Personal details
- Born: Edward Abdy Fellowes; 23 June 1895 London, England
- Died: 28 December 1970 (aged 75)
- Citizenship: United Kingdom
- Education: Marlborough College
- Civilian awards: Companion of the Order of the Bath (1945); Companion of the Order of St Michael and St George (1953); Knight Commander of the Order of the Bath (1955)

Military service
- Allegiance: United Kingdom
- Branch/service: British Army
- Years of service: 1914–1919
- Rank: Captain
- Unit: Royal West Surrey Regiment
- Battles/wars: World War I
- Military awards: Military Cross (1917)

Sir Edward Abdy Fellowes, KCB, CMG, MC (23 June 1895 – 28 December 1970) was an official of the Parliament of the United Kingdom and a former British Army officer who saw active service during World War I. He served as Clerk of the House of Commons from 1954 to 1961.

== Early life ==
Fellowes was born in London, England, on 23 June 1895. He was the eldest son of William Gordon Fellowes, a barrister, and his wife, Marian Augusta Fellowes (née Hamilton). He was educated at Marlborough College, then a boys private school in Marlborough, Wiltshire. In 1914, he was offered a place at Merton College, Oxford. However, with the outbreak of World War I, he joined the British Army rather than attend the University of Oxford.

== Career ==
=== Military service ===
On 19 November 1914, he was granted a commission as a temporary second lieutenant. On 15 March 1917, he was transferred to the training reserve and granted seniority in the rank of temporary lieutenant from 27 December 1915. On 4 May 1917, he was transferred from the training reserve to the Royal West Surrey Regiment. On 2 June 1917, he was promoted to temporary captain. On 6 September 1918, he was appointed adjutant of a service battalion of the Royal West Surrey Regiment.

During World War I, Fellowes saw active service with the British Army on the Western Front. As was common for those serving in the trenches, he spent some time in hospital being treated for gas poisoning following a mustard gas attack.

=== Parliamentary career ===
Fellowes Fellowes returned from the war a decorated officer but did not take up his university place. Instead, in 1919, he joined the clerkship of the House of Commons. He held the appointment of Assistant Clerk to the House from 1919 to 1937. On 31 July 1937, he was appointed Second Clerk Assistant of the House of Commons. On 3 August 1954, he was appointed Clerk of the House of Commons, succeeding Sir Frederic Metcalfe.

== Honours and decorations ==
In September 1917, Fellowes was awarded the Military Cross (MC) for service during World War I. He was also a recipient of the "Pip, Squeak and Wilfred" service medals; the 1914–15 Star, the British War Medal, and the Victory Medal.

For conspicuous gallantry and devotion to duty in leading his company in the attack. His personal example greatly encouraged the men under him, and for two days after the objective had been reached he displayed untiring energy and fearlessness in supervising the arrangements in the front line, constantly having to cross the open under heavy machine gun fire.

— Military Cross citation

In the 1945 New Year Honours, Fellowes was appointed Companion of the Order of the Bath (CB) in recognition of his service as Second Clerk Assistant. In 1953, he was appointed Companion of the Order of St Michael and St George (CMG). In the 1955 New Year Honours, he was promoted to Knight Commander of the Order of the Bath (KCB) for his service as Clerk of the House of Commons.

Government offices
Preceded by Sir Frederic Metcalfe	Clerk of the House of Commons; 1954 to 1961	Succeeded by Sir Barnett Cocks
