= Frederic Metcalfe =

British public servant (1886–1965)

Sir Frederic Metcalfe KCB

Clerk of the House of Commons
- In office 1948–1954
- Preceded by: Sir Gilbert Campion
- Succeeded by: Sir Edward Fellowes

1st Speaker of the House of Representatives of Nigeria
- In office 12 January 1955 – 1959
- Preceded by: Position established
- Succeeded by: Jaja Wachuku

Personal details
- Born: Fredric William Metcalfe; 4 December 1886
- Died: 3 June 1965 (aged 78)
- Citizenship: United Kingdom
- Party: None
- Spouse: Helen Goodman
- Education: Sidney Sussex College, Cambridge

Military service
- Allegiance: United Kingdom
- Branch/service: British Army
- Years of service: 1914–1919
- Unit: Rifle Brigade
- Battles/wars: World War I

Sir Frederic William Metcalfe KCB (4 December 1886 – 3 June 1965) was a British public servant. He was a former Clerk of the House of Commons and first Speaker of the House of Representatives of Nigeria.

== Early life ==
Metcalfe was born in 1886 to the family of W.P. Metcalfe of Ceylon and Stone Hall, Oxted. He had his early education at Wellington and Sidney Sussex College, Cambridge and later became an honorary fellow of the college.

== Career ==
=== Military service ===
During World War I, Metcalfe served with the army from 1914 to 1919 he served with the 6th Special Reserve Battalion of the Rifle Brigade.

=== Parliamentary ===
In 1919, Metcalfe gained appointment as an Assistant Clerk in the Department of the Clerk of the House of Commons, he was in the position until 1930 before he became Second Clerk Assistant. He became Clerk Assistant in 1937. In 1948, he was appointed as Clerk of the House of Commons until his retirement in July 1954, he succeeded Lord Campion in that position.

In 1955, Metcalfe became the first Speaker of the House of Representatives of Nigeria after its inauguration on 12 January 1955 by John MacPherson.

== Personal life ==
Metcalfe was married to Helen Goodman of Oxted.

Government offices
Preceded by Sir Gilbert Campion	Clerk of the House of Commons; 1948 to 1954	Succeeded by Sir Edward Fellowes
