= Richard Barlas =

British civil servant

Sir Richard Douglas Barlas KCB OBE (1916–1982) was a British civil servant who served as a clerk in the Parliament of the United Kingdom.

Barlas was commissioned as a pilot officer in the Royal Air Force Volunteer Reserve on 7 December 1937, but relinquished his commission on the grounds of ill-health on 30 November 1938. He rejoined the RAF during the Second World War and was promoted to war substantive flying officer on 28 December 1940. He was made an Officer of the Order of the British Empire on 1 January 1944 while holding the rank of Wing Commander.

Barlas was appointed a Companion of the Order of the Bath while serving as Second Clerk Assistant and Clerk of Committees in the House of Commons. He served as Clerk of the House of Commons between 1976 and 1979, and was appointed Knight Commander of the Order of the Bath in the 1977 Silver Jubilee and Birthday Honours.
