= Legislative Methods and Forms =

1901 book by Sir Courtenay Peregrine Ilbert

Legislative Methods and Forms is a 372 page book written by Sir Courtenay Peregrine Ilbert and published by Oxford in 1901. "It is a description of the rivalry between common and statute law, with special reference to the details of preparation, passage and codification of statutes in Great Britain and her colonies. The book also contains a complete and interesting collection of statutory forms for bills on various subjects commonly treated by Parliament." Donald Raistrick said it is useful. James Bryce said: "It is full of valuable information and acute remarks upon modern English legislation, and brings together a mass of historical facts never previously collected." "The chapter on 'Parliament as a Legislative Machine' will be interesting to the lay reader as well as to the publicist." By 1915, the book was "well known". By 1957, it had "fallen into an unmerited neglect".

In 1901, the Law Journal said "This is a work sui generis in English legal literature. As a former law member of the Indian Viceroy's Council, and subsequently a Parliamentary Counsel to the Treasury, Sir Courtenay Ilbert has had exceptional opportunities of acquiring an expert's acquaintance with the methods and forms of legislation at home and abroad, and every page of the interesting and valuable work now before us shows what thorough use he has made of them. The information contained in some at least of the chapters of this book is to be found—in a compendious form—nowhere else. We refer especially to the chapters on Common Law and Statute Law (I.), the English Statute-book (II.), Stages in the Improvement of English Statute Law (IV.), Consolidation of Statutes (VII.), Codification (VIII.), and Indian and Colonial Legislation (IX.). In Chapter XII. (Statutory Forms) the parliamentary draftsman will find a selection of precedents of the utmost value. Appendices II. and III. contain an annotation of the Interpretation Act 1889, and also the Rules Publication Act 1893. To the student of the history, development, and mechanism of legislation and to the practitioner who has bills to draft, Sir Courtenay Ilbert's new book will be indispensable. It is in every way a worthy sequel to the author's classic treatise on 'The Government of India'."

The reviewer in the Harvard Law Review said "The author's position, as Parliamentary Counsel to the Treasury, is a sufficient guaranty of the worth of any work from his hands on the subject of legislative methods, since upon him rests the responsibility for the drafting and form at every stage of all the Government Bills introduced into the British Parliament. From a man who has so ably filled this important office much was to be expected, and those who will have the good fortune to read Sir Courtenay Ilbert's book will be in no wise disappointed. Beginning with a brief sketch of the customary law of England and its relation to the statute law the author contrasts the English legal system with that of various countries of continental Europe. After a short discussion of the contents of the English statute book and the different editions of the Statutes, he describes at considerable length the various efforts to systematize and improve the statutory law, both by the expurgation of defunct Acts and by the consolidation of living measures. The chapter on codification is intensely interesting. The author ascribes the failure of the ambitious projects of the various codifiers partially to the absence in England of the motive force so keenly felt in continental Europe, namely, the absolute necessity consequent on increasing commerce of doing away with the diverse systems of law that so frequently prevailed in different portions of what had become one country. For example, in Germany, before the present code there were six general systems of law in force, besides numerous local customs. In England, however, the King's Writ ran over the entire country centuries before there was any central judicial authority in the continental nations. But the author finds the chief reason for the dilatoriness of England as regards codification in the haphazard system of English legal education, the student rarely seeking to take a scientific view of the legal principles he is applying. The author does not consider the cause of codification hopeless in England, notwithstanding the relaxation of such efforts since 1896, but he recognizes the great difficulties in its way— not the least of which is the general unpopularity of these Acts, and the almost entire passivity of the legal profession, with the exception of the commercial lawyers, to whose efforts are due what legislation there is along that line — the Partnership Act, The Bills of Exchange Act, and the Sale of Goods Act, to say nothing of that monumental piece of consolidation, the Merchants' Shipping Bill. A great deal of very valuable material is to be found in the chapter dealing with Indian and Colonial legislation. Its contents are largely based on the replies of the Colonies to questions propounded by the Colonial Office, at the instance of the Society of Comparative Legislation. The space devoted to each Colony is necessarily small, but the author has readily seized the salient points of their legislative methods. A noteworthy chapter treats of the efficiency of Parliament as a legislative machine. The book concludes with numerous specimens of statutory forms, and a discussion of their respective advantages and disadvantages. In short, it would be difficult to imagine a book of more use to the practical legislator. The style is so clear and pleasant, and the subject matter of such vital importance, that notwithstanding the necessarily technical nature of portions it is of great interest even to the unlearned reader."
