= Roger Sands =

British public servant (1942–2025)

Sir Roger Blakemore Sands, KCB (6 May 1942 – 28 August 2025) was a British public servant who served as Clerk of the House of Commons from 2003 to 2006.

Sands attended University College School in Hampstead, followed by Oriel College, Oxford. He joined the House of Commons as a parliamentary clerk in 1965. In the 2006 Queen's Birthday Honours, Sands was appointed a Knight Commander of the Order of the Bath (KCB) in recognition of his service as Clerk of the House and Chief Executive of the House of Commons. Sands died on 28 August 2025, at the age of 83.

Government offices
Preceded by Sir William McKay	Clerk of the House of Commons; 2003–2006	Succeeded by Sir Malcolm Jack
