= John Henry Ley =

English civil servant

Clerk of the House of Commons
- In office 1820–1850
- Preceded by: John Hatsell
- Succeeded by: Sir Denis Le Marchant, Bt

Personal details
- Born: 1770
- Died: 21 August 1850 (aged 79–80)
- Spouse: Lady Dorothea Hay (m. 1809)
- Children: 6
- Parent(s): Henry Ley; Mary Smith
- Education: Westminster School
- Alma mater: Christ's College, Cambridge

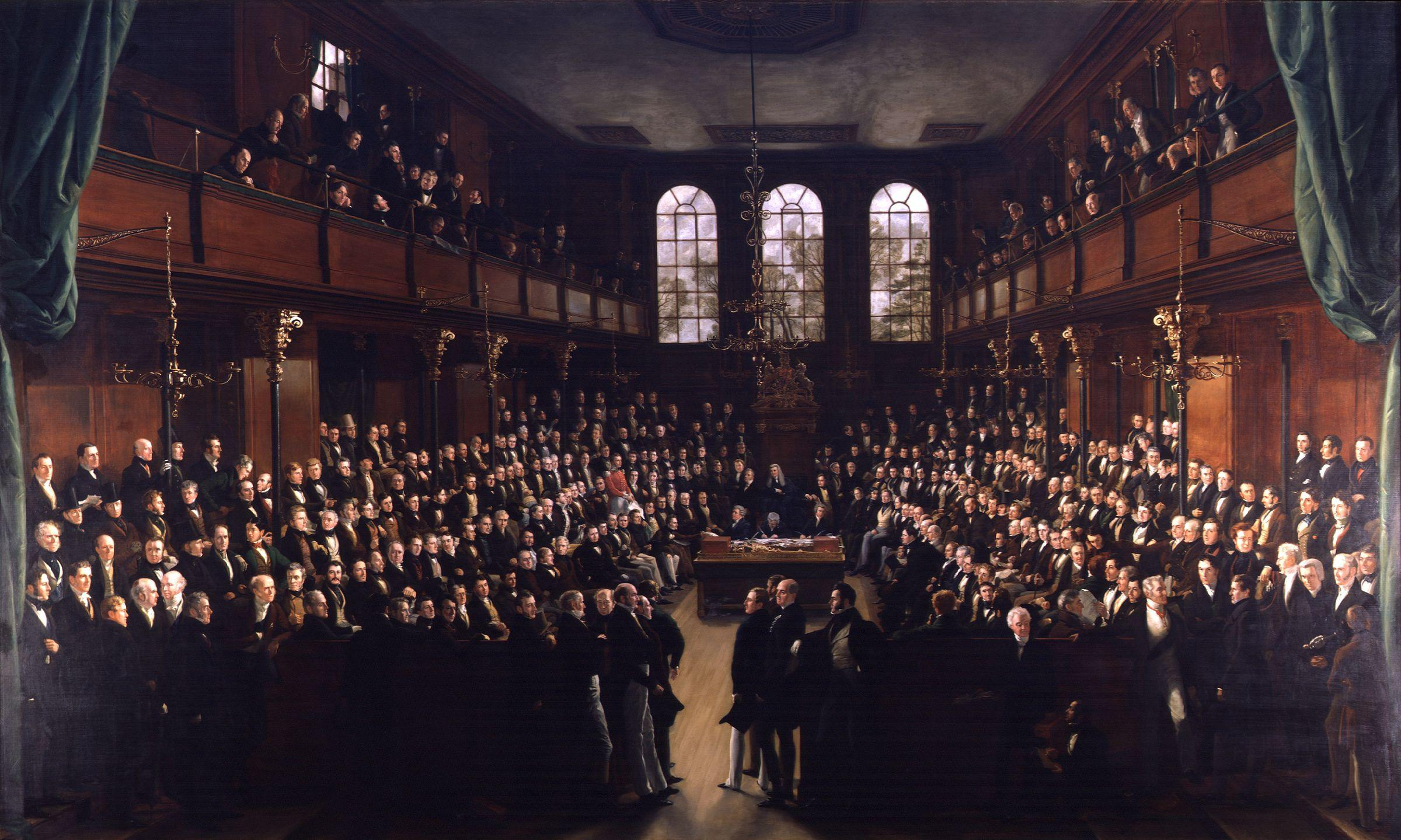

John Henry Ley (1770 – 21 August 1850), was an English civil servant who served as Clerk of the House of Commons from 1820 to 1850.

== Early life ==
He was a son of Henry Ley (1744–1824) and Mary (née Smith) Ley (1748–1834), a daughter of Capt. Smith of the Royal Navy. His sister, Mary Ley, married John Greathed Harris, FRS, and his younger brother, William Ley of Woodlands, was Assistant Clerk of the House of Commons from 1820 to 1856. (Note: Ley's younger brother, William Ley, married Frances Hatsell, a daughter of James Hatsell (brother of John Hatsell, Ley's predecessor Clerk of the House of Commons). Frances' sister, Penelope Hatsell, was the wife of the Hon. Rev. Littleton Powys (the second surviving son of Thomas Powys, 1st Baron Lilford and younger brother to Thomas Powys, 2nd Baron Lilford); and grandmother of Arthur Powys-Vaughan.)

His paternal grandparents were John Ley and Grace (née Grandy) Ley (a daughter of Henry Grandy, of Exeter). His family had been settled in Kenn for several generations and were "sprung from a common ancestor with the Leys, formerly Earls of Marlborough."

Ley was educated as a King's Scholar at Westminster School, before being elected a Scholar of Trinity College, Cambridge, but "being desirous of going to Christ Church, with his contemporaries, the Westminster Students, he was entered as a Commoner of that College; he was soon after presented to a Studentship by Dr. Shafto, one of the Canons." After earning his degree, he left Christ Church, and "commenced his studies for the law, in the office of Mr. Abraham Moore, an eminent special pleader, where he continued for two years, and kept his terms as Student of the Middle Temple."

== Career ==
His uncle, John Ley, served as Deputy Clerk of the House of Commons. In 1797, John Hatsell, the Clerk of the House of Commons since 1768, retired but kept his title and the official residence (next to the Commons), while his uncle carried out the normal business of the post. Hatsell and Ley divided the large income accruing to the clerks from the passage of private bills through Parliament. Around 1811, however, his uncle had a falling out with Hatsell over clerical appointments. Following Ley's death in 1814, his uncle's position was taken by Jeremiah Dyson the younger. Background to the quarrel was resistance to the Ley family influence, (Note: The Ley family had nine members working in the clerks' department of the Commons between 1768 and 1908.) in which Charles Abbot—Speaker from 1802 to 1817—sided with Hatsell.

Despite Hatsell's quarrel and Abbbot's opposition (Charles Manners-Sutton had become Speaker in 1817), upon Hatsell death in 1820, Ley was appointed Clerk of the House, which came with an annual salary of £3,500, together with an official residence. Ley's residence next to the Commons chamber in St Stephen's Chapel was among the parts of the old Palace of Westminster that was destroyed by fire in October 1834. He served in the role until his death in 1850, after which he was succeeded by Sir Denis Le Marchant, 1st Baronet. At the time of his death, however, the clerk assistant was his brother William and the second clerk assistant was his son Henry.

== Personal life ==
On 23 October 1809, Ley married Lady Dorothea Frances Hay (1789–1875), a daughter of George Hay, 7th Marquess of Tweeddale and Lady Hannah Charlotte Maitland (a daughter of James Maitland, 7th Earl of Lauderdale). When not in London, they lived at the Ley family seat, Trehill House in Kenn, Devon, and were the parents of five sons and one surviving daughter, including:

- John Henry Ley (1812–1865), who married Henrietta Porter, second daughter of Henry Porter, Esq. of Winslade House in Clyst St Mary, in 1845.
- Frances Dorothy Ley (d. 1885), who married the Rev. Villiers Henry Plantagenet Somerset, son of Gen. Lord Charles Somerset (second son of Henry Somerset, 5th Duke of Beaufort) and Hon. Elizabeth Courtenay (a daughter of William Courtenay, 2nd Viscount Courtenay), in 1844.
- George Thomas Ley (b. 1815)

Ley died on 21 August 1850. His widow died on 12 October 1875.

=== Descendants ===
Through his daughter Frances, he was a grandfather of two granddaughters; Frances Dorothea Charlotte Somerset (d. 1894) and Mary Isabella Frances Somerset (d. 1929), neither of whom married; and two grandsons; the Rev. Henry Plantagenet Somerset (1845–1926), Rector and Rural Dean at Crickhowell, and John Henry William Somerset (1848–1928).

Through his son, he was a grandfather of John Henry Francis Ley (1847–1930), who married Mary Coats Chamley (a daughter of Matthew Chamley of Warcop House, Westmorland).

Government offices
Preceded by John Hatsell	Clerk of the House of Commons; 1820–1850	Succeeded by Sir Denis Le Marchant, Bt
