= Charles Gordon (parliamentary official) =

English parliamentary clerk

Sir Charles Addison Somerville Snowden Gordon, KCB (25 July 1918 – 1 March 2009) was an English parliamentary clerk.

== Early life, education and war service ==
Born on 25 July 1918, Gordon was the son of Charles Gordon Snowden Gordon, a barrister from Liverpool. After attending Winchester College, he went up to Balliol College, Oxford, as a Domus scholar in 1936. He graduated in 1939 with a second-class honours degree in modern history. He then spent the Second World War with the Fleet Air Arm, before joining the House of Commons Department as an Assistant Clerk in 1946. According to The Independent, "His analytical skills and his articulacy ... made him a 'natural' Clerk and he became a first-class proceduralist".

== Career and later life ==
In 1947, he was promoted to Senior Clerk, and in 1962 became Fourth Clerk at the Table. The following year, he was appointed head of the Overseas Office (serving until 1969) and advised new Commonwealth parliaments on procedure. Promotion followed in 1967, when he became Principal Clerk of the Table Office, in 1974 on appointment as Second Clerk Assistant, and then two years later when he became Clerk Assistant. He had to advise on bills establishing the assemblies of Scotland and Wales, debates over which went on late into the night for consecutive days. In 1979, he was appointed Clerk to the House of Commons; during his tenure, which lasted until 1983, he authored the 20th version of Erskine May.

Gordon was appointed a Companion of the Order of the Bath (CB) in the 1970 Birthday Honours, and in the 1981 Birthday Honours was promoted to Knight Commander of the Order (KCB). His wife, Janet Beattie, died in 1995, and his last years were spent with his partner, Pamela Fernant. He died on 1 March 2009, leaving a son; his daughter predeceased him.
