= John Benger =

British parliamentary official (born 1959)

Sir John Benger KCB
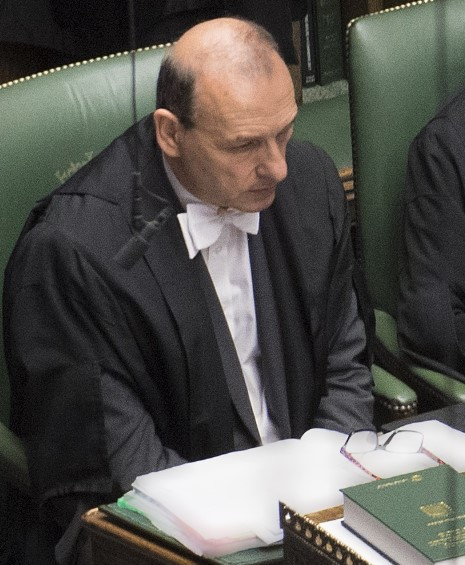
- Benger in 2019

40th Master of St Catharine's College, Cambridge
- Incumbent
- Assumed office 1 October 2023
- Preceded by: Sir Mark Welland

51st Clerk of the House of Commons
- In office 1 March 2019 – 1 October 2023
- Preceded by: Sir David Natzler
- Succeeded by: Tom Goldsmith

Personal details
- Born: John Stuart Benger; 18 November 1959 (age 66) Stockport, England
- Spouse: Susan Irvine (m. 1986)
- Children: 2
- Education: Stockport Grammar School
- Alma mater: St Catharine's College, Cambridge; Worcester College, Oxford

Sir John Stuart Benger KCB (born 18 November 1959) is a British parliamentary official. He has served as Master of St Catharine's College, Cambridge since October 2023. He previously served as Clerk of the House of Commons, the principal constitutional adviser to the House of Commons of the United Kingdom, and adviser on all its procedure and business, from 2019 to 2023.

== Early life and education ==
John Stuart Benger was born on 18 November 1959 in Stockport to Kurt Benger and Marian Benger (née Hollis). He studied at Stockport Grammar School and attended St Catharine's College, Cambridge, where he read English and graduated in 1982 with a Bachelor of Arts degree. Benger later studied at Worcester College, Oxford, where he earned a Postgraduate Certificate in Education in 1983, and a Doctor of Philosophy (DPhil) degree in 1989, with a doctoral thesis on "the authority of writer and text in radical Protestant literature, 1540 to 1593, with particular reference to the Marprelate tracts".

== Career ==
Benger joined the staff of the House of Commons in 1986, working in procedural and committee posts, and became a clerk in 1990. He was appointed the 51st clerk of the House of Commons and succeeded Sir David Natzler on 1 March 2019 upon his retirement.

In February 2023, Sir Lindsay Hoyle, Speaker of the House of Commons, announced Benger's resignation in the autumn to become the 40th master of St Catharine's College, Cambridge, his alma mater. He succeeded Sir Mark Welland in the role on 1 October 2023.

== Personal life ==
Benger married Susan Elizabeth Irvine in 1986 and has two sons. He is a supporter of the association football club Manchester United.

== Honours ==
Benger was appointed a Knight Commander of the Order of the Bath (KCB) in the 2023 New Year Honours for services to Parliament.

Government offices
Preceded by Sir David Natzler	Clerk of the House of Commons; 2019–2023	Succeeded by Tom Goldsmith
Academic offices
Preceded by Sir Mark Welland	Master of St Catharine's College, Cambridge; 2023–present	Incumbent
