= John Hatsell =

English civil servant

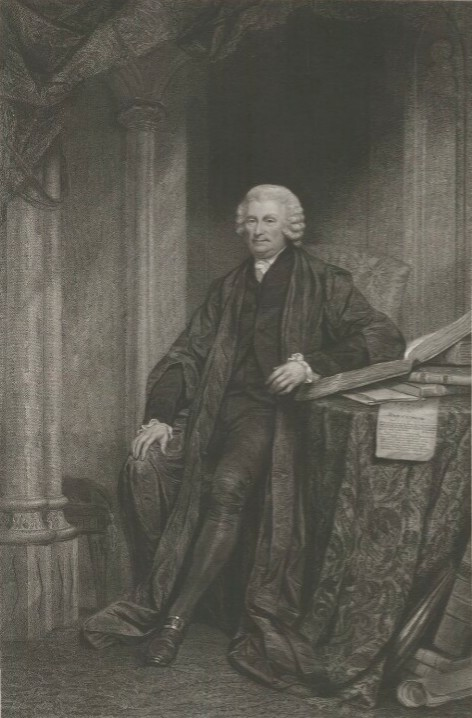
John Hatsell

John Hatsell (22 December 1733 – 15 October 1820) was an English civil servant, clerk of the House of Commons, and an authority on parliamentary procedure.

== Early life ==
He was the son of the lawyer Henry Hatsell (1701–1762), a bencher of the Middle Temple, and his wife Penelope Robinson, daughter of Sir James Robinson of Cranford Hall, Kettering; and grandson of Sir Henry Hatsell, SL, Baron of the Exchequer (1641–1714). He was educated at Queens' College, Cambridge, where he matriculated in 1751, graduating B.A. in 1755 and M.A. in 1760. He studied law in the Middle Temple, where he eventually became senior bencher.

== Clerk to the House of Commons ==
Hatsell owed his appointment as a clerk to the House of Commons to Jeremiah Dyson, who had himself purchased the post of chief clerk in 1748. Dyson was a reformer, and Hatsell was appointed as clerk assistant in 1760 on merit and paid nothing. He was recommended for the place, on his own account, by Dyson's friend Mark Akenside. He became chief clerk in May 1768 when he succeeded Thomas Tyrwhitt, who resigned.

On 20 January 1769 Hatsell gave an apology to John Wilkes for describing in a record an information laid against him as "blasphemy"; correctly it was an "impious and obscene libel", an offence only at common law. Two days earlier Wilkes had come from prison to the bar of the House of Commons to make the point. The incident was based on Wilkes's Essay on Woman. Hatsell visited Paris that year, and attended a royal hunt at Versailles where he became acquainted with Madame Dubarry among others. He then traveled to Strassburg and up the Rhine to Basle and on to Zurich and Lake Geneva. In 1770, he was back in Switzerland and then to Milan in Italy. In 1771 he toured the Orléannais. In 1772 it was Geneva again where he visited Voltaire before pressing on for Marseilles, Toulouse, Bordeaux and Paris.

Hatsell was involved in the drafting of the 1778 peace commission given to William Eden, an unsuccessful attempt to end the American Revolutionary War: he had responsibility for language on taxation. After his marriage that year, he gave up foreign travel, but visited country houses, and spent winters in Bath.

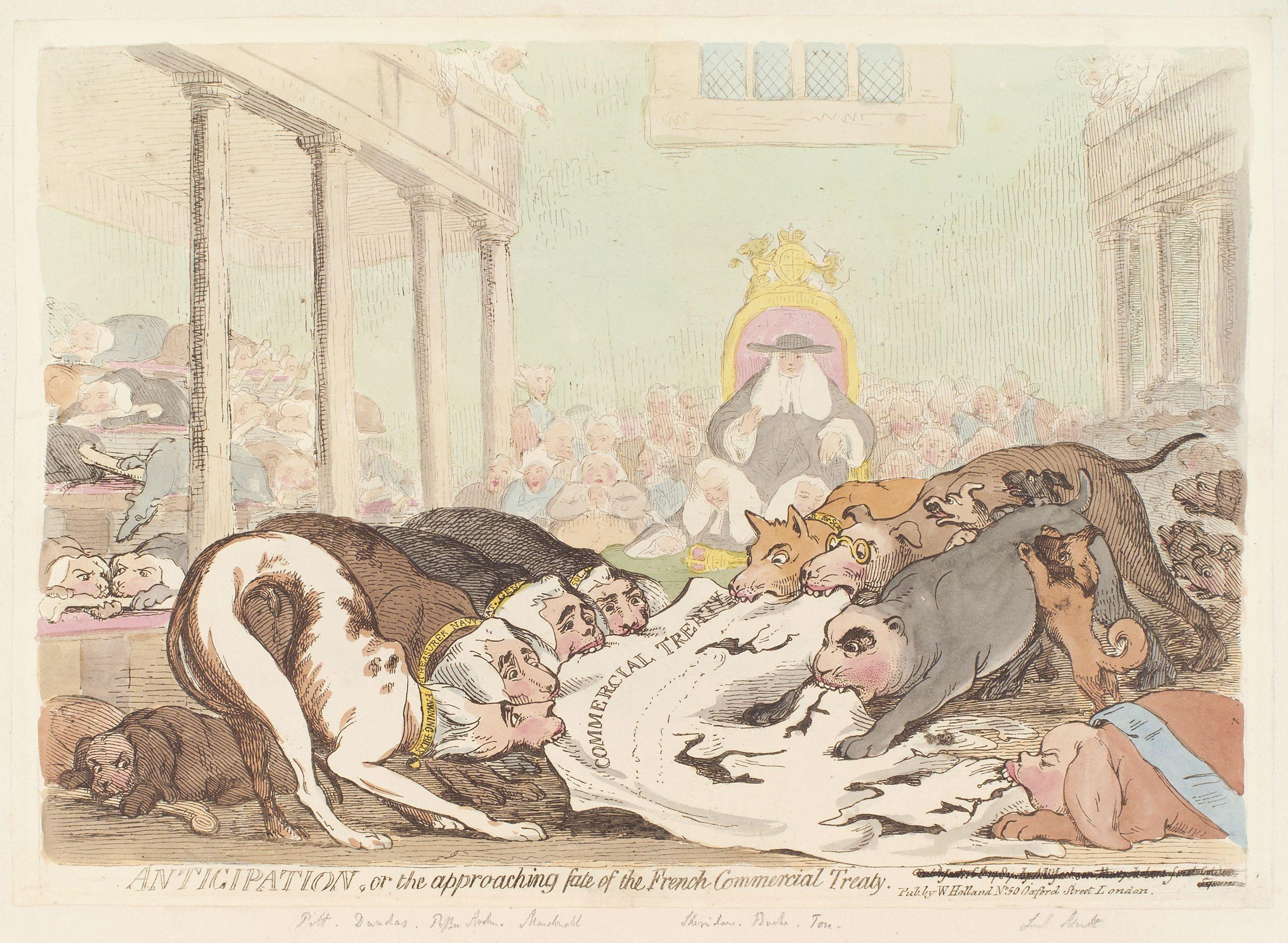
Satirical print from 1787 of the House of Commons by James Gillray, depicting in the background the clerks Hatsell and Ley, writing on the table before the Speaker

== Later life ==
On 11 July 1797 Hatsell retired, with the thanks of the House. He kept his title, however, and his official house, while John Ley (1733–1814) as deputy carried out the normal business of the post. He also divided with Ley the large income accruing to the clerks from the passage of private bills through Parliament.

Henry Addington, Speaker of the House of Commons from 1789 to 1801, took advice from both men on procedural matters. His nomination de facto was in the control of the ministry, as was generally the case during the 18th century; Hatsell, however, is thought by John Ehrman to have advised William Pitt, the Prime Minister, that the election had better appear to arise from the Members, at a time when expectations of the Speaker's independence were rising. Addington was in fact less conservative on procedural points: while Hatsell opposed innovation as such, he allowed some latitude.

A correspondence between Hatsell and Anne Grant began in 1805. He fell out with Ley, over clerical appointments, from around 1811. Ley died in 1814, and was replaced by Jeremiah Dyson the younger as deputy to Hatsell. Background to the quarrel was resistance to the Ley family influence, in which Charles Abbot—Speaker from 1802 to 1817—sided with Hatsell. In the end, however, Hatsell's own replacement was to be John Henry Ley, a nephew of John Ley.

Hatsell died at Marden Park, near Godstone, Surrey, on 15 October 1820; he resided there, but the property was let from Sir William Clayton, 4th Baronet. He was buried in the Temple Church.

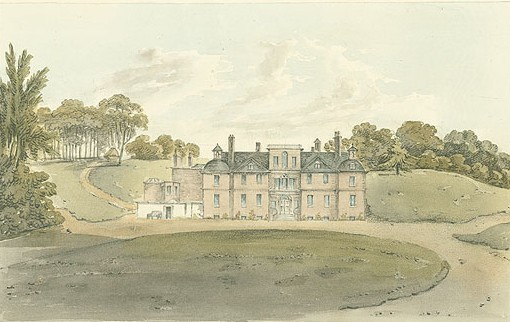
Marden Park, where John Hatsell lived at the end of his life, 1822 watercolour

== Works ==
Hatsell was the author of:

- A Collection of Cases of Privilege of Parliament, from the earliest records to 1628, London, 1776. In the British Museum there is a copy with copious manuscript notes by Francis Hargrave.
- Precedents of Proceedings in the House of Commons, under separate titles; with observations, 4 vols. London, 1781; second edit. 1785–96; third edit. 1796; fourth edition with additions by Charles Abbot, former Speaker of the House and now elevated as 1st Baron Colchester, 1818. Colchester took Hatsell to be the best authority on parliamentary procedure.

At the time of publication of Precedents of Proceedings, the most authoritative source for parliamentary procedure was Lex Parliamentaria of 1689. Hatsell in parliamentary matters was a follower of Arthur Onslow, Speaker of the House of Commons in 1760 when Hatsell was first appointed a clerk. Onslow was a stickler for precedent and detailed observance of procedure; and looked out for independent members and minority views. Speaker from 1727 to 1761, Onslow was also the influence behind Hatsell's pioneer codification of that procedure.

== Family ==
Hatsell in 1778 married Elizabeth Barton, widow of Newton Barton of Irthlingborough; she died in 1804 and is buried in the chancel of All Saints Church, Fulham, alongside her brother Jeffery Ekins, dean of Carlisle. Hatsell erected a fine monument to her in the church in 1805: it is located under the tower of the rebuilt church. She was formerly Elizabeth Ekins, daughter of the Rev. Jeffrey Ekins, Rector of Barton Seagrave, and was mother of Rev. John Barton, chaplain to the House of Commons, and Charles William Newton Barton, private secretary to Addington.

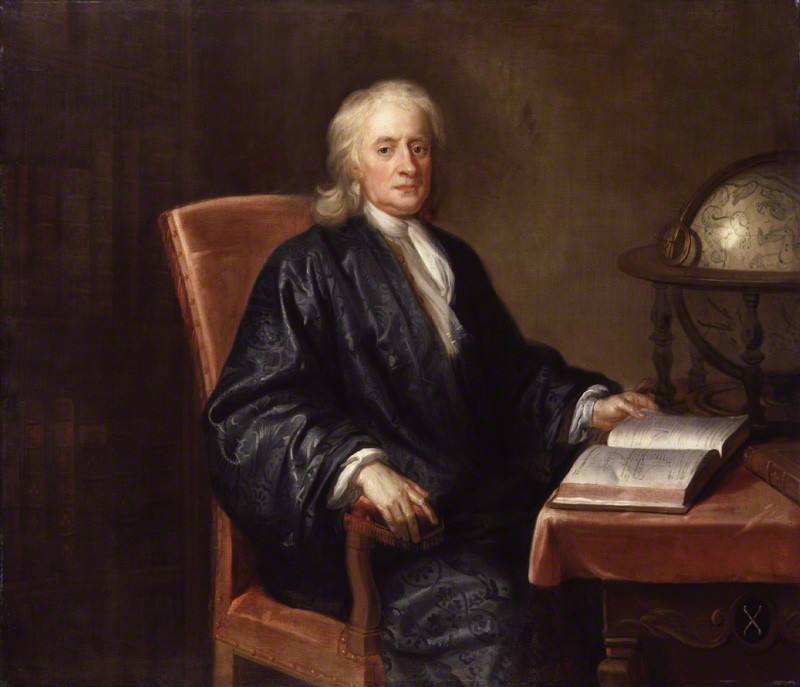
Sir Isaac Newton, portrait by Enoch Seeman, once in the possession of John Hatsell

A noted portrait of Sir Isaac Newton, now in the National Portrait Gallery, London, was left by Hatsell to the British Museum. His connection by marriage to the Bartons was into the extended family of Isaac Newton, Newton Barton being a great-grandson of Hannah Ayscough, Isaac Newton's mother, by her second marriage, to the Rev. Barnabas Smith.
