= Henry Scobell =

English Parliamentary official and editor

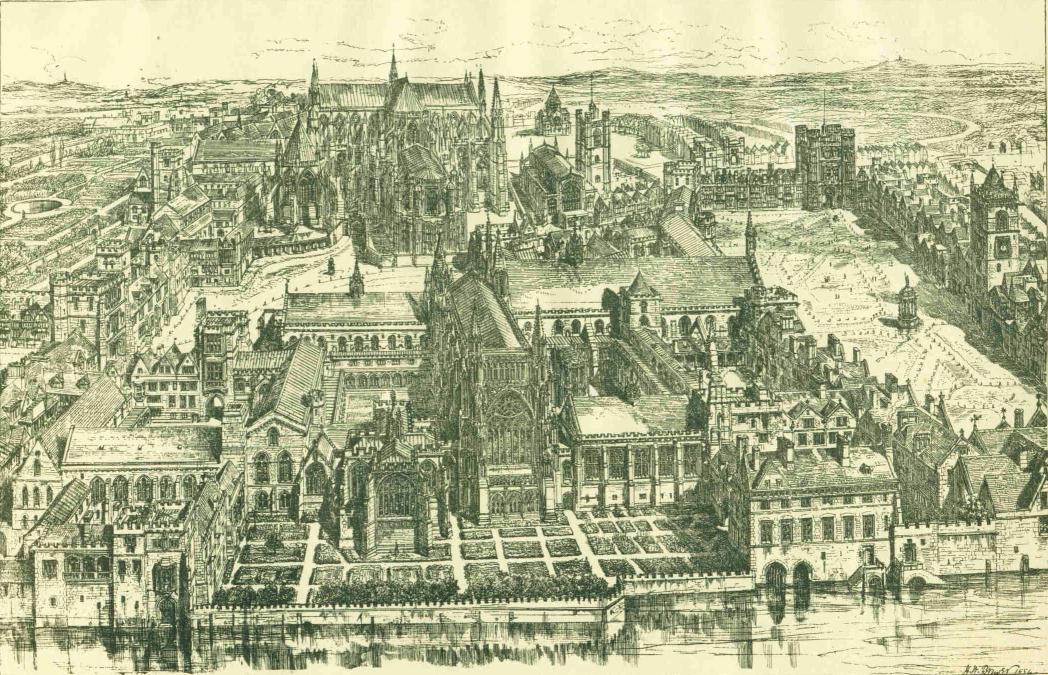
An 1884 drawing of what the Old Palace of Westminster (destroyed by fire in 1834), looked like in the time of Henry VIII when it was the seat of the Parliament of England

Henry Scobell (baptised 1610; died 1660) was an English Parliamentary official, and editor of official publications. He was clerk to the Long Parliament, and wrote on parliamentary procedure and precedents.

== Life ==
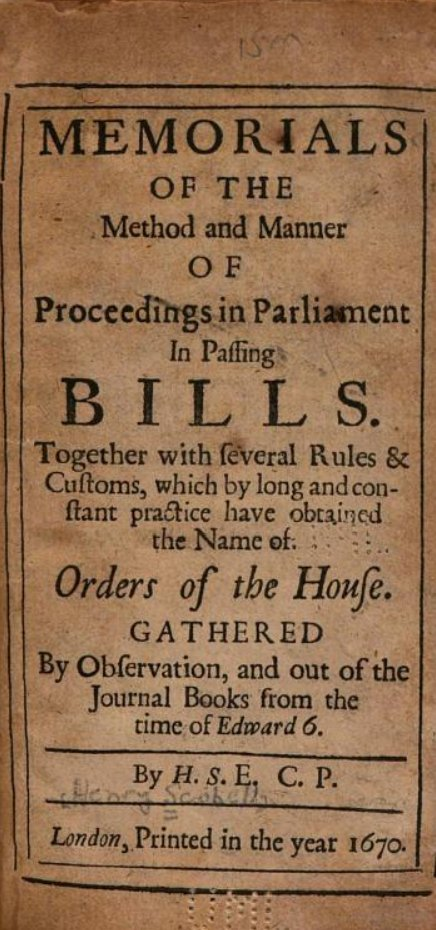
The title page of Memorials of the Method and Manner of Proceedings in Parliament in Passing Bills (3rd ed., 1670), written by "H.S. E. C.P." (Henry Scobell, Esquire, Clerk of Parliament)

Initially under-clerk of the parliaments, Scobell became Clerk of the House of Commons from 5 January 1649, his predecessor Henry Elsynge having resigned. Scobell also held a position as censor of publications, and then was Clerk of the Parliaments for life with effect from 14 May 1649. He was the first editor, from 9 October 1649, of Severall Proceedings in Parliament, an early official newspaper, and the second of Parliament's publications.

In the Rump Parliament, Scobell found himself in the middle of the clashes leading to its dissolution in 1653. He remained Clerk to Barebone's Parliament.

From 1655 Scobell became Clerk to the Council of State, a large jump in status, in succession to John Thurloe and sharing the position with William Jessop. Up to then he had been for a period an assistant secretary to the council.

In 1658, as a preliminary to the Savoy Assembly, Scobell called together elders of Independent churches from the London area, in the house of George Griffith (bishop). He himself was an elder of the Congregational church of John Rowe, meeting in Westminster Abbey.

In October 1659 he was one of those calling on George Monck to intervene in the vacuum of power after the death of Oliver Cromwell.

== Works ==
- Memorials of the Method and Maner of Proceedings in Parliament in Passing Bills. Together with Several Rules and Customs, which by Long and Constant Practice have Obtained the Name of Orders of the House. Gathered by Observation, and out of the Journal Books from the Time of Edward 6, London: Printed by Henry Hills and John Field, printers to His Highness, 1656, OCLC 606895390.
- A Collection of Acts and Ordinances of General Use, Made in the Parliament, Begun and Held at Westminster, the Third Day of November, anno 1640: And since, unto the Adjournment of the Parliament Begun and Holden the 17th of September, Anno 1656, and formerly Published in Print, which are here Printed at Large with Marginal Notes, or Abbreviated: Being a Continuation of that Work from the End of Mr. Pulton's Collection: In 2 Parts: Together with Several Tables of the Titles of, and Principal Matters Contained in the said Acts and Ordinances, and likewise of such as being of more Private and Particular Concernment, or less Use, or Omitted, London: Printed by Henry Hills and John Field ..., 1657–1658, OCLC 802073701.
- The Povver of the Lords and Commons in Parliament in Point of Judicature briefly Discours'd. At the Request of a Worthy Member of the House of Commons, London: s.n., 1680, OCLC 228723004.
