= Barnett Cocks =

British civil servant

Sir Thomas George Barnett Cocks KCB OBE (24 April 1907 – 2 February 1989) was a British civil servant who served as a clerk in the Parliament of the United Kingdom.

He first entered the Clerk's Department in 1931 and was made an Officer of the Order of the British Empire in the 1949 New Year Honours while working as a senior clerk in the House of Commons. He was appointed a Companion of the Order of the Bath in the 1961 New Year Honours. Between 1962 and 1974 he served as Clerk of the House of Commons. He was appointed a Knight Commander of the Order of the Bath in the 1963 New Year Honours.
