= Mark Welland =

British physicist (born 1955)

- Born: 18 October 1955 (age 70)
- Education: University of Bristol (MSc, PhD); University of Leeds (BSc)
- Spouse: Esme Lynora Otun
- Children: Four
- Awards: FRS (2002); FREng (2002); Knight Bachelor (2011)
- Scientific career
- Fields: Nanotechnology; Scanning probe microscopy
- Workplaces: University of Cambridge; Ministry of Defence (MoD); IBM Research
- Thesis: A study of grain boundaries in copper and copper-bismuth alloy (1984)

39th Master of St Catharine's College, Cambridge
- In office 1 October 2016 – 1 October 2023
- Preceded by: Dame Jean Thomas
- Succeeded by: Sir John Benger
- Website: eng.cam.ac.uk/profiles/mew10

Sir Mark Edward Welland, FRS, FREng (born 18 October 1955) is a British physicist who is a professor of nanotechnology at the University of Cambridge and head of the Nanoscience Centre. He has been a fellow of St John's College, Cambridge, since 1986 and started his career in nanotechnology at IBM Research, where he was part of the team that developed one of the first scanning tunnelling microscopes. He served as the Master of St Catharine's College, Cambridge from 2016 to 2023.

== Early life and education ==
Welland was born on 18 October 1955. He completed a Bachelor of Science (BSc) degree in physics from the University of Leeds in 1979 and Master of Science and Doctor of Philosophy (PhD) degree in physics from the University of Bristol in 1984 for research on grain boundaries.

== Career ==
Welland moved to Cambridge in 1987 and set up the first tunnelling microscopy group in the UK in collaboration with John Pethica. Currently at the Nanoscience Centre at the University of Cambridge researches into a number of aspects of nanotechnology ranging from sensors for medical applications to understanding and controlling the properties of nanoscale structures and devices.

In a recent award by the UK Research Councils, Welland has been made Director of an Interdisciplinary Research Collaboration in nanotechnology that, along with a purpose-built facility, represents an investment of $28 million for nanotechnology research at Cambridge. Until 2008, he was Editor-in-Chief of the Institute of Physics journal Nanotechnology, established in 1990, and, along with many other contributions at an international level, co-chairs the recently established Co-operative Research Initiative in Nanotechnology (CORINT) between the UK and Japan with Hiroyuki Sakaki of the University of Tokyo. He is also a Member of Council of the Royal United Services Institute.

Welland is also on the advisory board of Seraphima Ventures – a venture capital firm focusing mainly on nanotechnology startup companies.

In April 2008 he was appointed Chief Scientific Adviser (CSA) to the Ministry of Defence.

Welland's research has been funded by the Biotechnology and Biological Sciences Research Council (BBSRC) and the Engineering and Physical Sciences Research Council (EPSRC).

In September 2016 he was appointed Master of St Catharine's College, Cambridge, where he served until October 2023.

== Personal life ==
Welland is married to Esme Lynora Otun. Together they have four children: two sons and two daughters.

== Awards and honours ==
Welland was knighted in the 2011 Queen's Birthday Honours. In 2002, his contributions to nanotechnology research were recognised through his election to Fellowships of the Royal Society and Royal Academy of Engineering. His nomination for the Royal Society reads:

Mark Welland is a world leader in nanotechnology and scanned probe microscopy. His achievements combine the development of new experimental tools for nanoscale characterisation with the modelling of nano-scale properties, and an interdisciplinary approach to practical applications. His contributions include determining the mechanical properties of single molecules, and of molecular layers and polymer films at the nanometre scale; local electronic properties of semiconductors, insulators and metallic nanowires; optical property determination with atomic resolution; size and shape effects in sub-micron magnetic structures; sensors for chemical and biochemical recognition, and synthesis of new materials by direct nano-fabrication. His seminal contributions are internationally recognised, he leads an IRC, and he continues to be a fertile originator of new nano-scale science and technology.

In 2014, he was awarded an honorary Doctor of Science from the University of Bristol.

Welland was awarded an Honorary Doctorate of Science (DSc) by the University of Bath in 2024.

Academic offices
Preceded by Dame Jean Thomas	Master of St Catharine's College, Cambridge; 2016–2023	Succeeded by Sir John Benger
