= David Natzler =

Sir David Natzler KCB
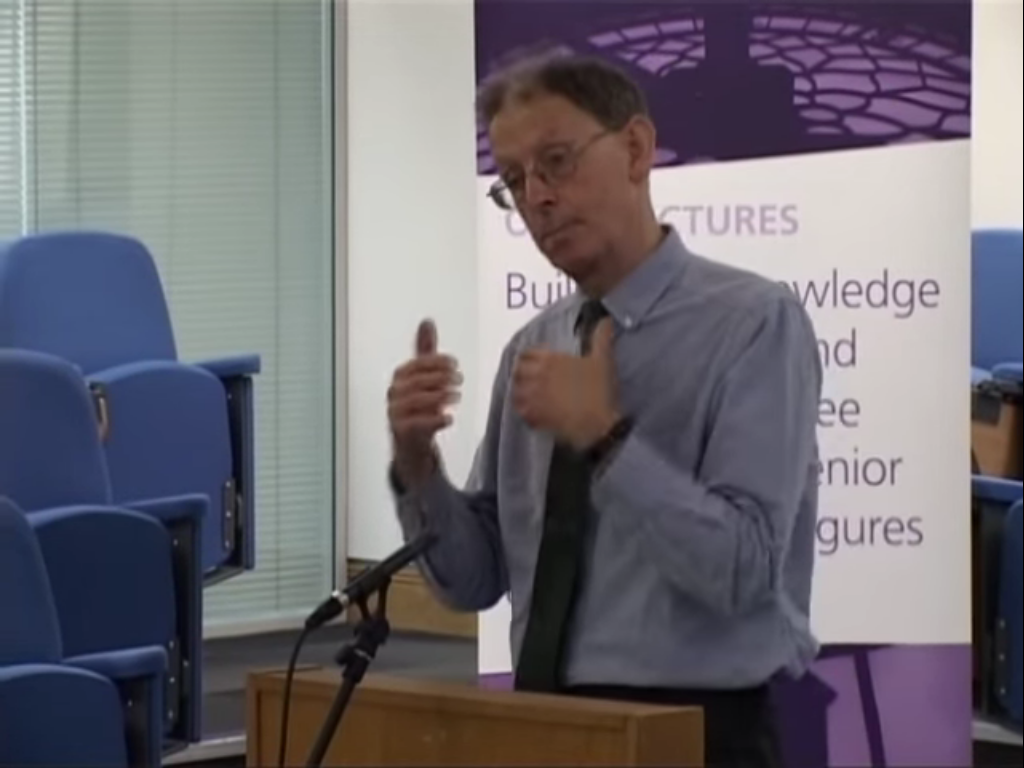

50th Clerk of the House of Commons
- In office 1 September 2014 – 1 March 2019
- Preceded by: Sir Robert Rogers
- Succeeded by: Sir John Benger

Personal details
- Born: David Lionel Natzler; 16 August 1952 (age 74) Hammersmith, London, England
- Spouse: Hilary Joan Gauld Thompson (m. 1988)
- Children: 3
- Education: Eton College
- Alma mater: Trinity College, Cambridge; Harvard University

Sir David Lionel Natzler KCB (born 16 August 1952) is a former Clerk of the House of Commons, the principal constitutional adviser to the House of Commons of the United Kingdom, and adviser on all its procedure and business. He was the 50th person to hold the role. Appointed by letters patent in March 2015, he was designated acting Clerk upon the retirement of Sir Robert Rogers in August 2014. He announced his retirement in a letter to the Speaker on 14 November 2018.

== Personal life ==
Natzler is the son of Pierre Natzler (1917–2020), an Austrian who served as an agent in the Special Operations Executive (SOE) during World War II. He was educated at Eton, Trinity College, Cambridge, and Harvard University, where he was a Kennedy Scholar.

Natzler is married with two sons and one daughter.

== Clerk of the House of Commons ==
Natzler had previously served as Clerk Assistant to Sir Robert Rogers. On notice of Rogers' proposed retirement, Commons Speaker John Bercow secured the agreement of the House of Commons Commission to a change in the person specification for the role of Clerk of the House of Commons and Chief Executive of the House of Commons Service.

Following a controversial recruitment process, Bercow proposed the selection of Carol Mills, then secretary of the Department of Parliamentary Services in the Parliament of Australia, for the job of Clerk of the House and Chief Executive, sending the formal nomination to the Prime Minister with the request that it be passed to the Sovereign, who makes the appointment by letters patent. The appointment process was questioned by many MPs and the nomination itself was opposed by several.

As a result, on the retirement of Rogers, Natzler was appointed as acting Clerk. The House of Commons established a committee on the governance of the House, chaired by former Cabinet Minister Jack Straw. The committee reported in December 2014. Inter alia the committee recommended that "The Clerk of the House should remain Head of the House service, appointed by Letters Patent, but should not also be titled Chief Executive" and that "a new post of Director General of the House of Commons should be created, reporting to the Clerk but with clearly delineated autonomous responsibilities for the delivery of services."

The recommendations of the report were debated and agreed to by the House on 22 January 2015. Mills subsequently withdrew from the process, the specification of the job she had applied for having changed substantially. In March 2015 Natzler was confirmed as the new Clerk.

In a letter to the Speaker of the House of Commons on 14 November 2018 Natzler announced his intention to retire on 1 March 2019. On 5 February 2019, Clerk Assistant John Benger was announced as Natzler's successor.

== Honours ==
In the 2018 Birthday Honours, Natzler was appointed Knight Commander of the Order of the Bath (KCB) for parliamentary service.

Government offices
Preceded by Sir Robert Rogers	Clerk of the House of Commons; 2014–2019	Succeeded by John Benger
