= Donald Limon =

Clerk of the House of Commons

Sir Donald Limon KCB

45th Clerk of the House of Commons
- In office 1994–1998
- Preceded by: Sir Clifford Boulton
- Succeeded by: William McKay

Sir Donald William Limon, KCB (29 October 1932 – 26 July 2012) was a British public servant who served as Clerk of the House of Commons from 1994 to 1997.

== Early life ==
Limon was born on 29 October 1932 in Hartlepool to Arthur Limon, the borough treasurer of West Hartlepool, and Dora Limon. He was educated at the Chorister School, Durham, an independent preparatory school adjacent to Durham Cathedral, and then from 1946 to 1950 at Durham School, then an all-boys private school in Durham. A keen cricketer, he played for the school first elevens and was captain of his house team. He was Head of House, the Caffinites, in his final year.

On leaving school, Limon undertook National Service at the Royal Army Service Corps brigade headquarters in the Republic of Korea. On discharge, and following a term of school teaching, in 1953 he accepted a local authority award to study Philosophy, Politics and Economics at Lincoln College, Oxford. He graduated from the University of Oxford with a second-class Bachelor of Arts (BA) degree in 1956.

== Career ==
In the autumn of 1956, Limon was appointed an Assistant Clerk in the House of Commons, and served in the Clerk's Department until his retirement in 1998. He was Clerk of Financial Committees from 1981 to 1984, Principal Clerk of the Table Office from 1985 to 1989, and the Clerk of Committees from 1989 to 1990. On 1 November 1990, he was appointed Clerk Assistant of the House of Commons. On 1 November 1994, he was appointed Clerk of the House of Commons therefore becoming chief executive of the house.

== Honours ==
Limon was appointed Companion of the Order of the Bath (CB) in the 1993 New Year Honours. He was promoted to Knight Commander of the Order of the Bath (KCB) in the 1997 Queen's Birthday Honours.
