= Clifford Boulton =

British parliamentary official (1930–2015)

Sir Clifford Boulton GCB DL

44th Clerk of the House of Commons
- In office 1987–1994
- Preceded by: Sir Kenneth Bradshaw
- Succeeded by: Sir Donald Limon

Personal details
- Born: Clifford John Boulton; 25 July 1930 Cocknage, Staffordshire, England
- Died: 25 December 2015 (aged 85)
- Party: None
- Spouse: Anne Raven (m. 1955)
- Children: 2
- Education: Newcastle-under-Lyme High School
- Alma mater: St John's College, Oxford
- Committees: Committee on Standards in Public Life (1994–2000)

Military service
- Allegiance: United Kingdom
- Branch/service: British Army
- Years of service: 1948–1950; 1952–1954
- Rank: Lieutenant
- Unit: Royal Armoured Corps; Staffordshire Yeomanry
- Battles/wars: Korean War

Sir Clifford John Boulton, GCB, DL (25 July 1930 – 25 December 2015) was a senior official in the Parliament of the United Kingdom. From 1987 to 1994, he was the Clerk of the House of Commons.

Born in Staffordshire, Boulton was educated at Newcastle-under-Lyme High School. He then did National Service for two years in the British Army and fought in the Korean War as a tank commander. Having returning to civilian life, he studied modern history at the University of Oxford.

In 1953, Boulton joined the Clerk's Department of the House of Commons as an assistant clerk. He was later clerk of the Procedure Select Committee, clerk of the Commons Select Committee of Privileges and clerk of the Overseas Office of the House of Commons. He joined the senior ranks of the Clerk's Department as Principal Clerk of the Table Office (1979–1982), and Clerk Assistant of the House of Commons (1983–1987). Finally, he was appointed Clerk of the House of Commons. His entire career between university and retirement was spent working as one of the clerks of the House of Commons.

== Early life and education ==
Boulton was born on 25 July 1930 in Cocknage, Staffordshire, England. He was the son of Stanley Boulton and Evelyn Boulton (née Hey), and grew up on the family farm. He was educated at Newcastle-under-Lyme High School, a private school in Newcastle-under-Lyme, Staffordshire.

Boulton was awarded an exhibition (a type of scholarship) to study at St John's College, Oxford. However, it was preferred that men would complete their National Service before attending university. After service in the British Army, he matriculated into St John's to study modern history. He graduated from the University of Oxford with a Bachelor of Arts (BA) degree in 1953.

== Career ==
=== Military service ===
Boulton completed his National Service between leaving school and starting university. He was commissioned into the Royal Armoured Corps. He was a tank commander during the Korean War. After serving in the army for the required two years, he returned to civilian life and took up his place at university.

Boulton continued his military service by joining the Territorial Army. On 7 September 1952, while still at university, he was commissioned into the Staffordshire Yeomanry as a second lieutenant. He was promoted to lieutenant on 29 November 1953. He was transferred to the Territorial Army Reserve of Officers on 16 November 1954; this meant he was no longer in the active reserve nor liable for being called up to fight abroad. On 1 April 1967, he resigned his commission thereby ending his time serving in the military.

=== Parliamentary career ===
Having graduated from university in 1953, Boulton joined the clerk's department of the House of Commons as an assistant clerk. In 1964, he was appointed clerk of the Procedure Select Committee. Then, between 1972 and 1977, he was clerk of the Commons Select Committee of Privileges. He was appointed clerk of the Overseas Office of the House of Commons in 1977, and then appointed Principal Clerk of the Table Office in 1979.

On 1 August 1983, Boulton was appointed Clerk Assistant of the House of Commons. The Clerk Assistant is the second most senior clerk in the House of Commons. On 2 September 1987, he was appointed Clerk of the House of Commons, succeeding Sir Kenneth Bradshaw. He was the 44th Clerk since the position was created in the 1300s. He retired in 1994, a year early, and was succeeded by Donald Limon.

== Later life ==
Having retired from the House of Commons in 1994, Boulton joined the newly created Committee on Standards in Public Life. The committee is an independent advisory body that advises the prime minister on ethical standards in public life. He stood down in 2000.

In retirement, Boulton lived in Lyddington, Rutland. He died on 25 December 2015.

== Personal life ==
Boulton was an active member of the Church of England. At one point, he was churchwarden of St Margaret's, Westminster, the parish church of the House of Commons.

In 1955, Boulton married Anne Raven. They adopted two children. Their daughter, Sally, is a catering manager, and their son, Richard, is a barrister and Queen's Counsel. Lady Boulton died in 2021.

Boulton was a fan of soap operas; his favourite was Coronation Street. He was also a keen gardener.

== Honours ==
In 1985, Boulton was appointed a Companion of the Order of the Bath (CB). In the 1990 New Year Honours, he was promoted to Knight Commander of the Order of the Bath (KCB), and therefore granted the honorific title Sir. In the 1994 Queen's Birthday Honours, he was promoted to Knight Grand Cross of the Order of the Bath (GCB). On 15 September 1997, he was appointed a Deputy Lieutenant (DL) of the County of Rutland by its Lord Lieutenant.
