= Members' Expenses Committee =

The Members' Expenses Committee, until July 2011 called the Members' Allowances Committee, was a select committee of the British House of Commons, the lower house of the United Kingdom Parliament. The committee advises the Members Estimates Committee and the Leader of the House of Commons on any potential developments in the allowances system for members of the Commons.

== Establishment and Initial Mandate (2009) ==
The committee was established on 22 January 2009 as one of several motions put forward by the government attempting to deal with the issue of MPs' expenses which were due to be released under the Freedom of Information Act 2000. The committee was also asked to propose an interim system of expenses and allowances for MPs shortly after the MPs' expenses scandal broke in May 2009.

== The Rise of IPSA and Committee Dormancy ==
The Independent Parliamentary Standards Authority (IPSA) was created in answer to the expenses scandal, and the Speaker's Committee on IPSA to oversee it. As a result, the committee lay dormant from the May 2011 general election until July 2011.

== Renaming and Final Mandate (2011) ==
The committee was renamed, with the expectation of new members being appointed, amid marked dissatisfaction with the expenses scheme developed by IPSA. Its task was to report back to the House on the operations of the Parliamentary Standards Act 2009 (which established IPSA) with due consideration to the following:

1. value for money for taxpayers
2. accountability
3. public confidence in Parliament
4. the ability of members to fulfill their duties effectively
5. fairness for less well-off members and those with families
6. whether members are deterred from submitting legitimate claims

== Membership ==
As of 18 July 2011, the members of the committee are as follows:

Member	Party	Constituency
Adam Afriyie MP (Chair)	Conservative	Windsor
Guto Bebb MP	Conservative	Aberconwy
Cathy Jamieson MP	Labour Co-op	Kilmarnock and Loudoun
Edward Leigh MP	Conservative	Gainsborough
Priti Patel MP	Conservative	Witham
Nick Raynsford MP	Labour	Greenwich and Woolwich
Joan Walley MP	Labour	Stoke-on-Trent North
Stephen Williams MP	Liberal Democrats	Bristol West

Source: Members' Expenses Committee

== See also ==
- Parliamentary committees of the United Kingdom
