= Baron Farnborough =

Title in the Peerage of the United Kingdom

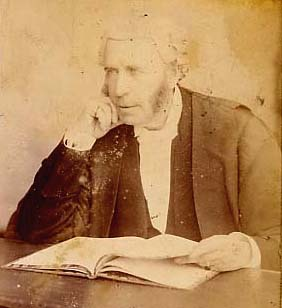
Erskine May, 1st Baron Farnborough.

Baron Farnborough is a title that has been created twice in the Peerage of the United Kingdom. The first creation came on 8 July 1826 when the politician and art collector Charles Long, of Saxmundham in Suffolk, was made Baron Farnborough, of Bromley Hill Place in the County of Kent. The title became extinct on his death in 1838. Lord Farnborough was the brother of Samuel Long, Member of Parliament for Ilchester, and Beeston Long, Governor of the Bank of England. The barony referred to Farnborough, Kent.

The second creation came on 11 May 1886 when the constitutional theorist Sir Erskine May was made Baron Farnborough, of Farnborough in the County of Southampton. He died only six days later, when the peerage became extinct. The second creation of the barony of Farnborough is the second shortest-lived peerage title in British history (after the barony of Leighton). The barony referred to Farnborough, Hampshire.

== First creation (1826) ==
- Charles Long, 1st Baron Farnborough (1760–1838)

== Second creation (1886) ==
- Thomas Erskine May, 1st Baron Farnborough (1815–1886)
