= List of fellows of the Royal Society elected in 1835 =

Fellows of the Royal Society elected in 1835.

== Fellows ==
1. Robert Alexander (1795–1843), barrister
2. Edward Blackett Beaumont (1802–1878)
3. Albert William Beetham (1802–1895)
4. William Borrer (1781–1862), botanist
5. James Burnes (1801–1862), surgeon
6. John Davidson (1797–1836), traveller
7. Joseph Delafield (d. c.1842)
8. Richard Dobson (c.1773–1847), surgeon
9. John Edye (1789–1873), naval designer
10. Charles Elliott (1776–1856), Indian Civil Service
11. George William Featherstonhaugh (1780–1866), geologist
12. James Alexander Gordon (1793–1872), physician
13. John Hamett (d. 1847)
14. John Greathed Harris (c.1774–1850)
15. Robert John Harvey (1785–1860)
16. William Bentinck Letham Hawkins (1802–1894)
17. Thomas Jones (1775–1852)
18. Thomas Leybourn (1770–1840)
19. Thomas Mayo (1790–1871), physician
20. William Molesworth (1810–1855), politician
21. George Moore (c.1777–1859), architect
22. Arthur Morgan (1801–1870), actuary
23. Charles Henry Oakes (1810–1864)
24. Benjamin Oliveira (1806–1865), politician
25. John Henry Pelly (1777–1852), businessman
26. William Symonds (1782–1856), naval surveyor
27. Richard Taunton (c.1774–1838)
28. William Tite (1798–1873), architect
29. Martin Tupper (1780–1844), physician
30. Samuel Warren (1807–1877), lawyer
31. James Wigram (1793–1866), barrister, MP
32. Charles James Blasius Williams (1805–1889), physician

== Foreign members ==
1. Jean-Baptiste Élie de Beaumont (1798–1874), French geologist
2. Frédéric Cuvier (1773–1838), French zoologist
3. Marie Jean Pierre Flourens (1794–1867), French physiologist
4. Peter Andreas Hansen (1795–1874), Danish/German astronomer
5. Otto August Rosenberger (1800–1890), German astronomer
