= House of Commons Commission =

The House of Commons Commission is the overall supervisory body of the House of Commons administration in the United Kingdom. The commission is a corporate body established by the House of Commons (Administration) Act 1978 (c. 36). The commission continues to exist during the dissolution period and the person who was Speaker continues in office as a member of the commission until a speaker is chosen by the new parliament.

== Responsibilities ==
The commission is responsible for the Administration Department and the departments of the Speaker, Clerk of the House of Commons, Serjeant at Arms, Library and Official Report of the House of Commons. Its responsibilities are:

- Appointing staff of the House (excluding the Clerk of the House of Commons, Clerk Assistant, Serjeant at Arms, and Speaker's personal staff)
- Preparing and laying before the House the Estimates for the House of Commons Service
- Allocating functions to House departments
- Maintenance of the Palace of Westminster and the Parliamentary Estate
- Reporting annually to the House on its actions and on financial estimates for the financial year

Members of Parliament can question the spokesperson of the commission in the same way as they can question government ministers. The House of Commons Commission claims not to be a public authority for the purposes of the Freedom of Information Act 2000 or the Environmental Information Regulations 2004.

=== Delegated responsibilities ===
The commission delegates some of its statutory responsibilities to the House of Commons Executive Board. The House of Commons Executive Board manages day-to-day operations, including ensuring that staff terms and conditions are met consistently. The commission has no responsibility for pensions, allowances or salaries. Pensions are dealt with by the Members Estimate Committee. Salaries and allowances are considered by the Independent Parliamentary Standards Authority.

== Membership ==
House of Commons (Administration) Act 1978 (Note: Section 5(1).)
- Act of Parliament
- Parliament of the United Kingdom
- Long title: An Act to make further provision for the administration of the House of Commons.
- Citation: 1978 c. 36
- Territorial extent: United Kingdom

Dates
- Royal assent: 20 July 1978
- Commencement: 20 July 1978 (in part); 1 January 1979 (rest of act); (Note: Section 5(5).)
Other legislation
Amends	Contracts of Employment Act 1972; Employment Protection Act 1975
Repeals/revokes	House of Commons (Offices) Act 1812; House of Commons Officers Act 1834; House of Commons Offices Act 1846; House of Commons Offices Act 1849
Amended by	Statute Law (Repeals) Act 1989; Trade Union and Labour Relations (Consolidation) Act 1992; Employment Rights Act 1996; Government Resources and Accounts Act 2000; Constitutional Reform and Governance Act 2010; Public Service Pensions Act 2013; House of Commons Commission Act 2015

Status: Amended

Text of statute as originally enacted

Revised text of statute as amended

Text of the House of Commons (Administration) Act 1978 as in force today (including any amendments) within the United Kingdom, from legislation.gov.uk.

Commission membership was laid out in the House of Commons (Administration) Act 1978 (c. 36). Membership consisted of the Speaker of the House of Commons, the Leader of the House of Commons, a member of parliament appointed by the Leader of the Opposition, and three members of parliament appointed by the House of Commons. The three members appointed by the House of Commons cannot also be Ministers of the Crown. Membership was updated by the House of Commons Commission Act 2015. The 2015 act expanded the Commission to include an additional member of parliament and four lay members.

The Speaker remains a member, despite a dissolution of Parliament, until a new Speaker is elected. Aside from the Leader of the House (who remains a member until a new Leader is appointed), the others also remain members during a dissolution unless they do not seek nomination as an MP or fail to be re-elected at the general election.

The membership of the Members Estimates Committee is identical to that of the Commission. However, because it is a committee, it ceases to exist during a dissolution of Parliament.

=== Current membership ===
Member	Role
Sir Lindsay Hoyle MP (Chair)	Speaker of the House of Commons
Lucy Powell MP	Leader of the House of Commons
Jesse Norman MP	Shadow Leader of the House of Commons
Rachel Blake MP	Labour Member of Parliament for Cities of London and Westminster
Nick Smith MP	Labour Member of Parliament for Blaenau Gwent and Rhymney
Steve Barclay MP	Conservative Member of Parliament for North East Cambridgeshire
Marie Goldman MP	Liberal Democrat Member of Parliament for Chelmsford
Tom Goldsmith	Lay member, Clerk of the House of Commons
Marianne Cywnarski	Lay member, Director General (Operations) of the House of Commons
Shrinivas Honap	Lay member
Catherine Ward	Lay member

== Estimates and related committees ==
Currently, funding for the House of Commons is divided into two blocs: the Administration Estimate and the Members Estimate. The Administration Estimate provides for the Commons portion of the Parliamentary Estates, the Chamber, and Commons staff. The Commission takes direct responsibility for the Administration Estimate and is assisted by the Administration Audit Committee (made up of three MPs and outside three members) in auditing the Estimate.

The Members Estimate includes funds for MPs' pay, expenses, and staffs, as well as Short Money (financial assistance to opposition parties). The House of Commons created the Members Estimate Committee (MEC) to oversee it, but provided that its membership be the same as that of the Commission. The MEC has appointed a Members Estimate Audit Committee with the same membership as the Administration Audit Committee.

The House also created the Members' Allowances Committee to advise the MEC on its functions. It was also created to advise the MEC, Speaker, and Leader of the House on other allowances issues; to approve guidance for MPs on allowances, and to resolve questions regarding allowances rules referred by MPs.

With the creation of the Independent Parliamentary Standards Authority, funds for pay, allowances, and staffing are no longer part of the Members Estimate, reducing it by 80%. Because IPSA only took responsibility for MPs' pay during the 2010/11 financial year, there will still be a substantial Members' Estimate. But, the Director of General Resources has recommended folding the rump of the Members Estimate into the Administration Estimate beginning with 2011/12, and in their advice to the House of Commons during consideration of the bill that created IPSA, the members of the Estimates Audit Committees anticipated that would happen. Eliminating the Members Estimate would lead to the elimination of the MEC and Members Estimates Audit Committee, and quite possibly the Members' Allowances Committee.

== Trade unions ==
The House recognises the FDA (which represents senior staff), Prospect, the Public and Commercial Services Union and GMB, which represent staff of the House and collectively form the House's Trade Union Side (TUS). GMB represents a range of House staff, including catering, cleaning and other support staff, and is the largest trade union on the parliamentary estate. MPs' staff are not employees of the House of Commons Service, but of the individual Members for which they work. GMB operates a dedicated branch for MPs' and Peers' staff, providing representation for those staff, and has a representative on the House of Commons Commission.
