= Archibald Milman =

British civil servant (1834–1902)

Sir Archibald John Scott Milman KCB (1834–14 February 1902) was a British civil servant who served as a clerk in the Parliament of the United Kingdom.

Milman joined the clerical staff of the House of Commons in 1857, and in 1870 he was made second clerk assistant. He served as Clerk of the House of Commons between 1900 and 1902, but poor health led to his early retirement. He was appointed a Knight Commander of the Order of the Bath on 21 January 1902. He died less than a month after leaving office and five weeks after being awarded a knighthood.

He was accused by Irish nationalist MPs, including Thomas Sexton, of having too much influence over the chair during debates surrounding the Government of Ireland Bill 1893.
