= Caroline S. Hill =

British scientist

Caroline Hill
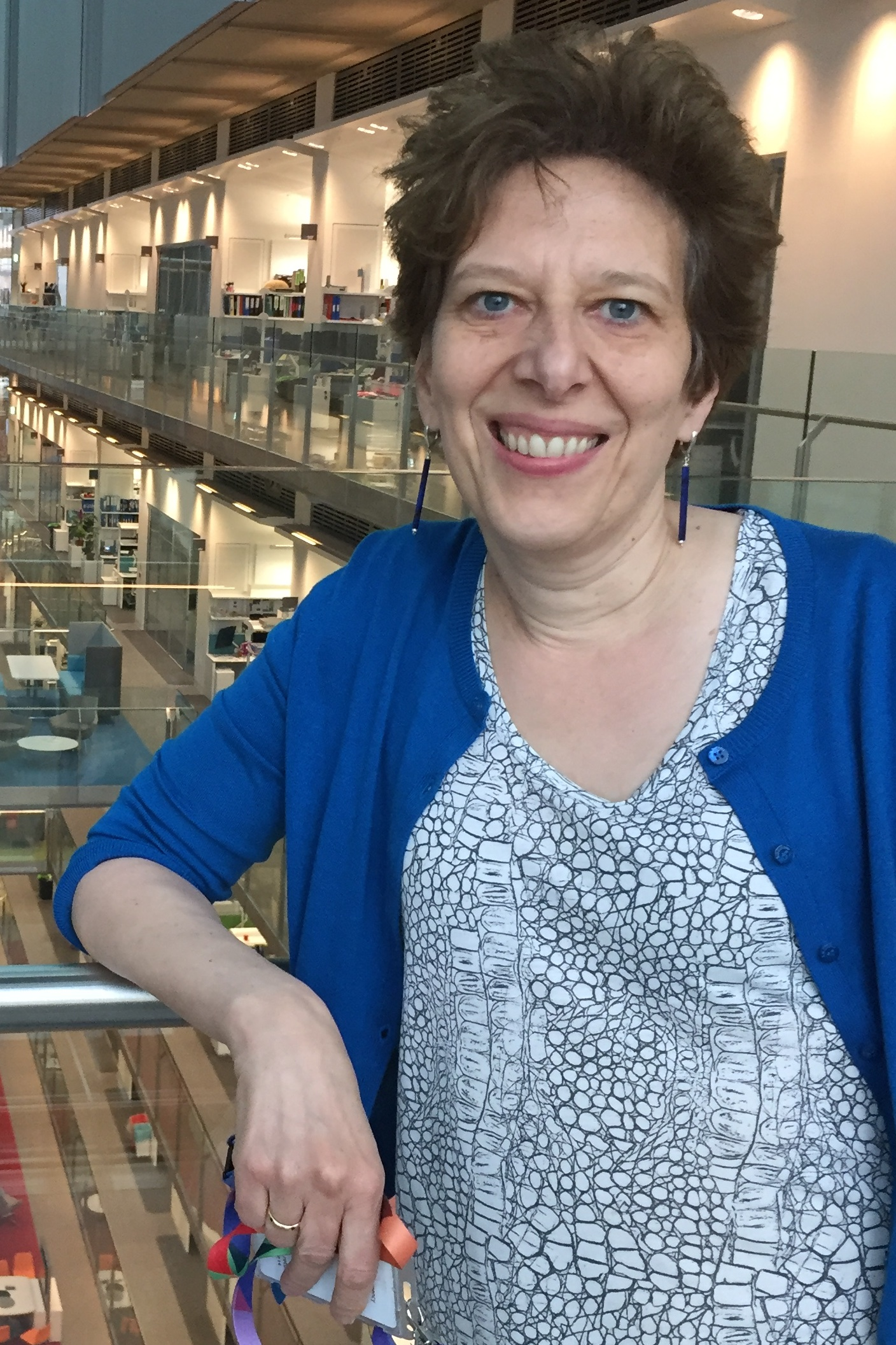
- Hill in 2017
- Born: Caroline Susan Hill
- Education: North London Collegiate School
- Alma mater: University of Cambridge (BA, PhD)
- Spouse: Peter Bradshaw
- Awards: EMBO Member (2002); Member of the Academia Europaea (2013); Fellow of the European Academy of Cancer Sciences (2015); Fellow of the Academy of Medical Sciences (2019)
- Scientific career
- Fields: Developmental biology Cancer biology Signal transduction
- Institutions: Francis Crick Institute
- Thesis: Structural studies of sea urchin sperm chromatin (1988)
- Doctoral advisor: Jean Thomas
- Website: www.crick.ac.uk/research/a-z-researchers/researchers-d-j/caroline-hill

Caroline Susan Hill (born 21 October 1961) is a group leader and head of the Developmental Signalling Laboratory at the Francis Crick Institute.

== Education ==
Hill was educated at North London Collegiate School and graduated from the University of Cambridge with a first in Natural Sciences in 1984. She was an undergraduate at Trinity Hall, Cambridge and then did postgraduate research at Murray Edwards College, Cambridge, then known as New Hall, and was awarded a PhD in 1989 for research supervised by Jean Thomas.

== Career and research ==
Hill moved to the Cancer Research UK (CRUK) London Research Institute (now part of the Francis Crick Institute) in 1998, to head up the Developmental Signalling Laboratory. In November 2016, she was interviewed on the BBC World Service, along with the Crick's chief executive Paul Nurse about the future of biomedical research.

=== Awards and honours ===
Hill was elected a member of the European Molecular Biology Organization (EMBO) in 2002 and a Member of the Academia Europaea in 2013. In 2015, she was elected a Fellow of the European Academy of Cancer Sciences. In 2019, she was elected a Fellow of the Academy of Medical Sciences.
