= William McKay (parliamentary official) =

British government administrator, Clerk of the House of Commons

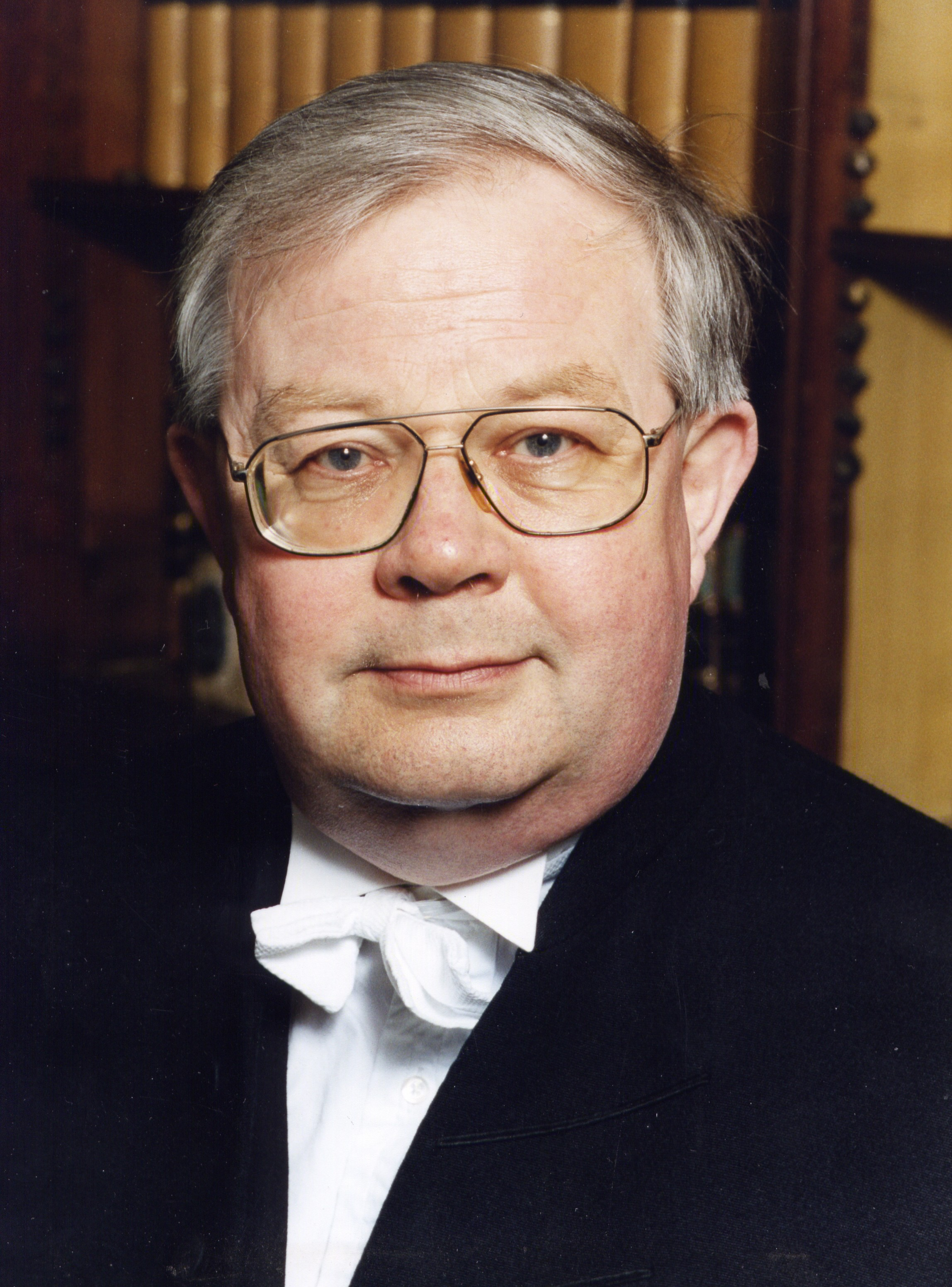
Sir William Mckay KCB

Sir William Robert McKay, KCB (born 18 April 1939) is a British administrator. He was Clerk of the House of Commons between 1998 and 2002, and was appointed in 2012 to chair the Commission on the consequences of devolution for the House of Commons, which reported the following year.

== Biography ==
After graduating from the University of Edinburgh, he entered the Clerks Department of the House of Commons in 1961, rising to become Clerk of the House in 1998. Following his retirement in 2002, he took up a position as professor in the School of Law at Aberdeen University, and served on various bodies dealing with legal and constitutional matters, including the Legal Questions Committee of the General Assembly of the Church of Scotland, and as an observer on the Law Society of Scotland’s ruling council. In 2012 he was appointed to chair the Commission on the consequences of devolution for the House of Commons, which reported on 25 March 2013.

He is married to a Church of Scotland Minister and has two daughters and four grandchildren.

Government offices
Preceded by Sir Donald Limon	Clerk of the House of Commons; 1998 to 2003	Succeeded by Sir Roger Sands
