= Clerk of the House of Commons =

Clerical role in Parliament of the UK

Under Clerk of the Parliaments
- Incumbent; Thomas Goldsmith since 1 October 2023
- House of Commons
- Status: Principal constitutional adviser to the House and Corporate Officer of the House
- Seat: Palace of Westminster
- Appointer: The Crown (de jure); on the recommendation of a committee of the House of Commons Commission (de facto)
- Inaugural holder: Robert de Melton
- Formation: 1363 (first permanent appointment)

The Under Clerk of the Parliaments, known informally as the clerk of the House of Commons, is the chief executive of the House of Commons in the Parliament of the United Kingdom, and before 1707 in the House of Commons of England. The Clerk of the Parliaments is the counterpart in the House of Lords.

== Appointment ==
The Clerk of the House is appointed by the sovereign by Letters Patent, in which they are styled "Under Clerk of the Parliaments [...] to attend upon the Commons". Before 1748, the Clerkship of the House of Commons could be purchased until Jeremiah Dyson (then Clerk of the House) ended the practice of purchase when he left the Clerkship.

== Duties ==
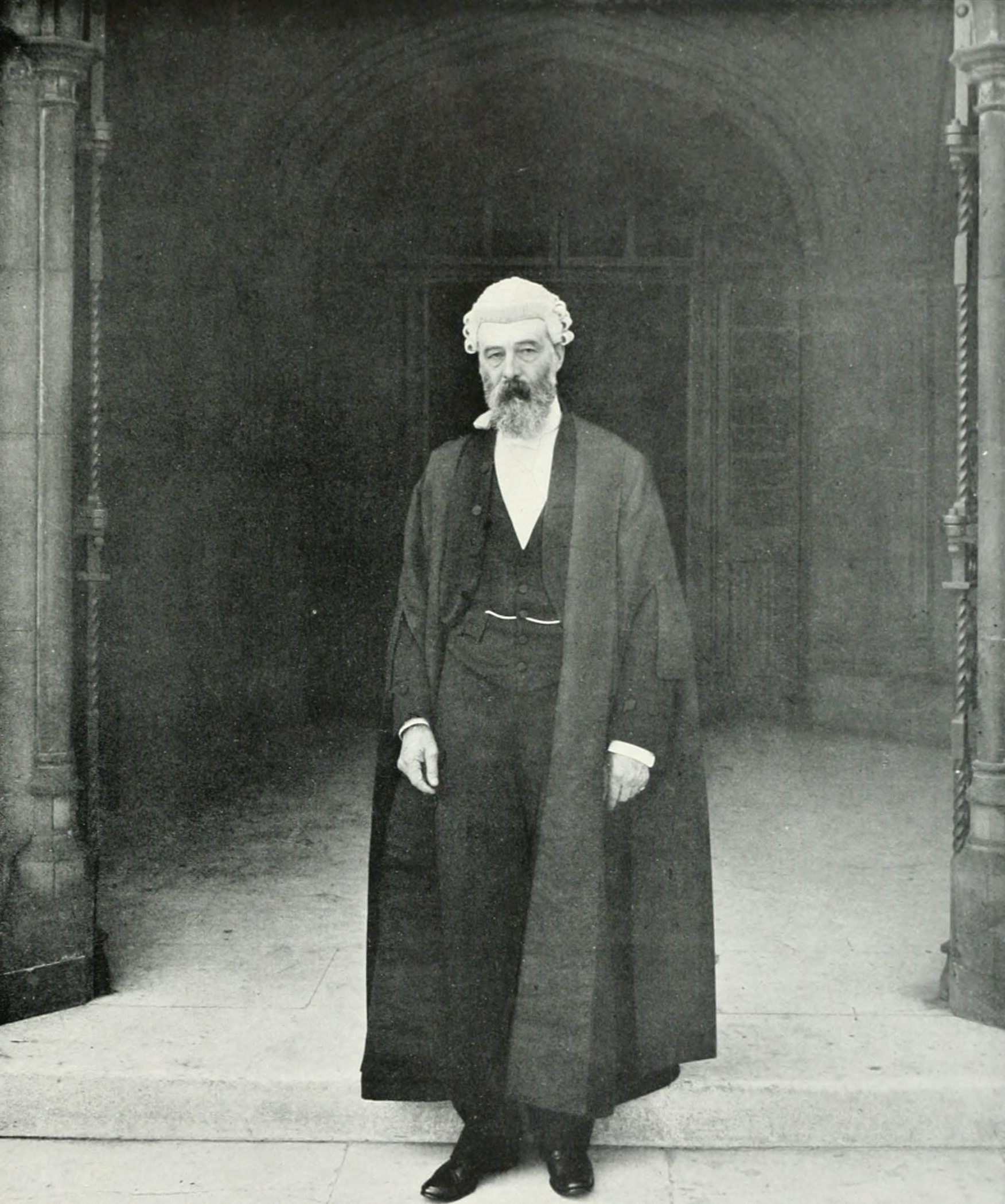
Sir Courtenay Ilbert

The Clerk of the House is the principal constitutional adviser to the house, and adviser on all its procedure and business, including parliamentary privilege, and frequently appears before select and joint committees examining constitutional and parliamentary matters. As with all the members of the House Service, he is politically entirely impartial and is not a civil servant. Until 1 January 2008, when the reforms to the house's governance proposed by the Tebbit Review of management and services of the house were implemented, the clerk was the head of the Clerk's Department. He sits at the table of the house, in the right-hand chair (the left-hand chair, looking towards the Speaker's chair) for part of every sitting. The historic role of the clerks at the table is to record the decisions of the house (not what is said, which is recorded by Hansard). This they (but not the clerk) still do. The clerks at the table used to wear court dress with wing collar and white tie, a bob (barrister's) wig and a silk gown. However, as of February 2017 the clerks will only have to wear gowns. For the State Opening of Parliament and other state occasions, the Clerk of the House wears full court dress with breeches, and a lace jabot and cuffs.

== Incumbent ==
As of October 2023, the office is currently held by Thomas Goldsmith, previously the Principal Clerk of the Table Office, who replaced Sir John Benger when he retired on 1 October 2023.

== List of Clerks of the House of Commons ==
=== 14th century ===
- 1363 – Robert de Melton
- 1385 – John de Scardeburgh

=== 15th century ===
- 1414 – Thomas Haseley
- 1440 – John Dale
- 1461 – Thomas Bayen

=== 16th century ===
- 1504 – Thomas Hylton
- 1510 – William Underhill
- 1515 – Robert Ormeston
- 1547 – John Seymour
- 1570 – Fulk Onslow

=== 17th century ===
- 1603 – Ralph Ewens
- 1611 – William Pinches
- 1612 – John Wright
- 1639 – Henry Elsyng
- 1649 – Henry Scobell
- 1658 – John Smythe
- 1659 – John Phelips
- 1659 – Thomas St. Nicholas
- 1660 – William Jessop
- 1661 – William Goldsborough
- 1678 – William Goldsborough the Younger
- 1683 – Paul Jodrell

=== 18th century ===
- 1727 – Edward Stables
- 1732 – Nicholas Hardinge
- 1748 – Jeremiah Dyson
- 1762 – Thomas Tyrwhitt
- 1768 – John Hatsell (1733–1820)
  - 1797 – Hatsell retired, and John Ley (1733–1814), Deputy Clerk, took over his duties
  - 1814 – Jeremiah Dyson the younger, Deputy Clerk

=== 19th century ===
- 1820 – John Henry Ley (on the death of Hatsell)
- 1850 – Sir Denis Le Marchant, 1st Baronet
- 1871 – Sir Thomas Erskine May
- 1886 – Sir Reginald Palgrave

=== 20th century ===
- 1900 – Sir Archibald Milman
- 1902 – Sir Courtenay Ilbert
- 1921 – Sir Thomas Lonsdale Webster
- 1930 – Sir Horace Dawkins
- 1937 – Sir Gilbert Campion
- 1948 – Sir Frederic Metcalfe
- 1954 – Sir Edward Fellowes
- 1962 – Sir Barnett Cocks
- 1974 – Sir David Lidderdale
- 1976 – Sir Richard Barlas
- 1979 – Sir Charles Gordon
- 1983 – Sir Kenneth Bradshaw
- 1987 – Sir Clifford Boulton
- 1994 – Sir Donald Limon
- 1998 – Sir William McKay

=== 21st century ===
- 2003 – Sir Roger Sands
- 2006 – Sir Malcolm Jack
- 2011 – Sir Robert Rogers
- 2015 – Sir David Natzler (acting 2014–2015)
- 2019 – Sir John Benger
- 2023 – Tom Goldsmith
- 2026 – Eve Samson

== See also ==
- Clerk of the Parliaments
- Clerk of the Scottish Parliament
- Chief Executive and Clerk of the Senedd
- Clerk of the Northern Ireland Assembly
