= Tom Goldsmith =

British parliamentary official (born 1974)

Thomas Goldsmith

52nd Clerk of the House of Commons
- Incumbent
- Assumed office 1 October 2023
- Monarch: Charles III
- Preceded by: Sir John Benger

Personal details
- Born: Thomas Goldsmith; 28 November 1974 (age 51) London, England
- Education: Ilford County High School
- Alma mater: University of York (BA)

Thomas Goldsmith (born 28 November 1974) is a British parliamentary official. Since 2023, he has served as Clerk of the House of Commons, the principal constitutional adviser to the House of Commons of the United Kingdom.

== Biography ==
Goldsmith was born on 28 November 1974 in London to Thomas Henry Goldsmith and Catherine Mary Goldsmith (née Peak). He was educated at Ilford County High School, an all-boys grammar school in Ilford. He studied philosophy and politics at the University of York, graduating with a Bachelor of Arts (BA) degree in 1996.

Goldsmith joined the staff of the House of Commons in 1996 as a clerk. He worked in procedural and committee posts such as Secretary to the House of Commons Commission, Head of the Committee Office, Clerk of Committees and Principal Clerk of the Table Office.

In March 2023, his appointment as Clerk of the House of Commons was announced. He succeeded Sir John Benger on 1 October following Benger's appointment as Master of St Catharine's College, Cambridge.

On 5 March 2026 it was announced that Goldsmith would be leaving the House of Commons in autumn 2026.

Parliament of the United Kingdom
Preceded by Sir John Benger	Clerk of the House of Commons; 2023–present	Incumbent
