= Horace Dawkins =

British civil servant

Sir Horace Christian Dawkins KCB MBE (25 December 1867 – 4 February 1944) was a British civil servant who served as a clerk in the Parliament of the United Kingdom.

He was educated at Eton College and Balliol College, Oxford. During the First World War he served as a Divisional Commander in the Metropolitan Special Constabulary, and was made a Member of the Order of the British Empire on 7 January 1918.

Dawkins was appointed a Companion of the Order of the Bath (CB) in the 1925 Birthday Honours while Clerk Assistant. Between 1930 and 1937 he served as Clerk of the House of Commons, and he was appointed a Knight Commander of the Order of the Bath (KCB) on 31 October 1925.
