= John Sharp (Archdeacon of Northumberland) =

English clergyman and charity administrator (1723–1792)

John Sharp (2 April 1723 – 28 April 1792) was a Church of England clergyman who served as Archdeacon of Northumberland for thirty years, and a charity administrator.

== Early life ==
Sharp was the son of Thomas Sharp, Archdeacon of Northumberland (son of John Sharp, Archbishop of York) and Judith (daughter of Sir George Wheler). His brothers included the surgeon William Sharp and the anti-slavery campaigner Granville Sharp.

He was educated at Durham School and Trinity College, Cambridge, where he matriculated in 1740, graduating B.A. in 1744, M.A. in 1747, D.D. in 1759. He became a Fellow of Trinity College in 1746.

== Church career ==
He was ordained deacon in 1748, and priest in 1749. In the church, he held the following livings:

- Rector of Hartburn, Northumberland, 1749–92
- Vicar of Hexham, Northumberland, 1759–60
- Archdeacon of Northumberland, 1762–92
- Rector of Howick, Northumberland, 1762–92
- Prebendary of Durham Cathedral, 1768–92
  - Canon of the 9th Prebend, 1768–91; Canon of the 11th Prebend, 1791–92
- Perpetual Curate of Bamburgh, Northumberland, 1772–92

== Lord Crewe's Charity ==
Lord Crewe's Charity is a charity founded under the terms of the will of Nathaniel, Lord Crew (died 1721), Bishop of Durham, and endowed with his estates of Blanchland and Bamburgh.

John Sharp became a trustee of Lord Crewe's Charity in 1758, and perpetual curate of Bamburgh in 1773. Under his stewardship, the charity restored the keep of Bamburgh Castle, and also established schools for boys and girls; a windmill within Bamburgh Castle and a shop selling corn at a subsidised rate; a hospital with an infirmary and a dispensary; temporary accommodation for shipwrecked sailors, and a lifeboat built by Lionel Lukin.

On his death in 1792, Sharp gifted his personal library to Lord Crewe's Charity.

== Family ==
On 4 December 1752, Sharp married Mary Dering, daughter of Heneage Dering, Dean of Ripon.
