= William Sharp (surgeon) =

English surgeon

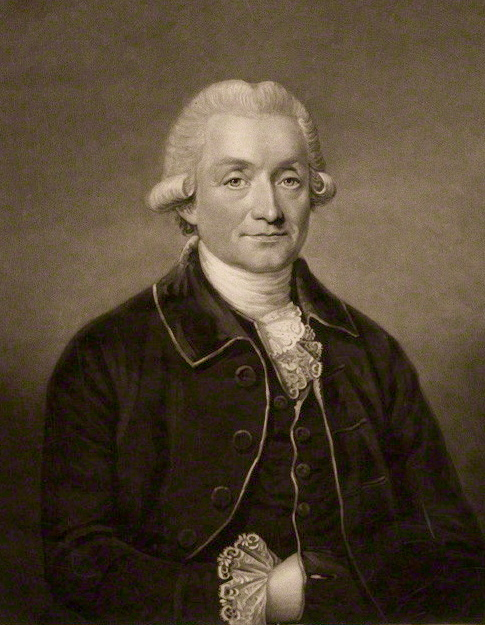
- Born: 1729
- Died: 17 March 1810 (aged 80–81)
- Occupation: Surgeon
- Employer: George III
- Spouse: Catherine (née Barwick)

William Sharp (1729 – 17 March 1810) was an English physician reported to have acted as surgeon to King George III. With his brother Granville Sharp, he was an active supporter of the early campaign against slavery in Britain.

He commissioned a well-known painting of his extended family playing music on a barge.

== Early life ==
The son of Thomas Sharp, Archdeacon of Northumberland, William Sharp was born in 1729. His grandfather, John Sharp, also a Church of England clergyman, had risen to become Archbishop of York, and Sharp's father was his biographer. His other grandfather was Sir George Wheler. Sharp was one of a family of thirteen children, although three of his brothers died in infancy. Sent first to a local school in Northumberland, at the age of fourteen he left his parents to go to London as a student of surgery.

== Career ==
In February 1755, Sharp became an assistant-surgeon at St Bartholomew's Hospital, in the City of London, and he resigned from the hospital in 1779. He published some medical papers, including one advocating the use of paste board as a material for splinting fractured limbs, and another concerning a stone removed from the bladder of "the Rev. Mr. T. C." His medical appointment book for 1784-1785 survives.

He was elected a Fellow of the Royal Society in April 1769

Alexander Chalmers's A General Biographical Dictionary says of him that he was "...many years an eminent surgeon in London". In a catalogue of Zoffany's works it is reported that Sharp declined a baronetcy, which was offered as a reward for his successful attendance on Princess Amelia. Such an attendance in 1798 is confirmed by the published correspondence of George III.

In 1769, Sharp had a house in London's Old Jewry, but at that time for most of the year he and his wife lived on a barge moored in the River Thames. During the last twenty-two years of his life, Sharp lived at Fulham House, Fulham, a property previously owned since the 15th century by John Stourton, 1st Baron Stourton, and his descendants. The house was sometimes also called Stourton House and adjoined the Fulham bridge. While living there, he added a waterside cottage which was connected to the main house by an underground passage going under Church Lane.

Sharp married Catherine Barwick, the fifth daughter of Thomas Barwick of London. They had only one child, a daughter called Mary, who in May 1800 married Thomas John Lloyd Baker, of Hardwicke Court, Gloucestershire, and had three children, Catherine, Mary Anne, and Thomas Barwick Lloyd Baker (born 1808). Mary Baker died at Dawlish on 26 December 1812.

Sharp twice came to notability.

=== The case of Jonathan Strong ===
Sharp used to treat poor Londoners at his house. One night, he was asked for help by a slave who had been beaten by his owner. Sharp treated the man but also discussed the case with his brother, Granville Sharp. The man was called Jonathan Strong and he had been so badly beaten that he was nearly blind and required four months of treatment at St Bartholomew's Hospital. Sharp met the expense of Strong's recovery and arranged his employment with a pharmacist. However, two years later, while Strong was serving as a footman on the pharmacist's coach, he was seen by his owner, David Lisle, who sold him to a Jamaican planter and had him kidnapped. Strong got a message to Granville Sharp, who immediately took the matter up with the Lord Mayor of London, who called a hearing and declared Strong to be now free. Lisle challenged Granville Sharp to a duel, but he declined, later explaining "David Lisle, Esquire, (a man of the law) called on me to demand gentlemanlike satisfaction. I told him that as he had studied the law so many years, he should want no satisfaction that the law could give him." The English courts ultimately sided with the Sharp brothers, denying an application that they should pay Lisle two hundred pounds in damages for taking another man's property. From this encounter, Sharp's younger brother Granville went on to become an early advocate for the abolition of slavery and remained so for fifty years.

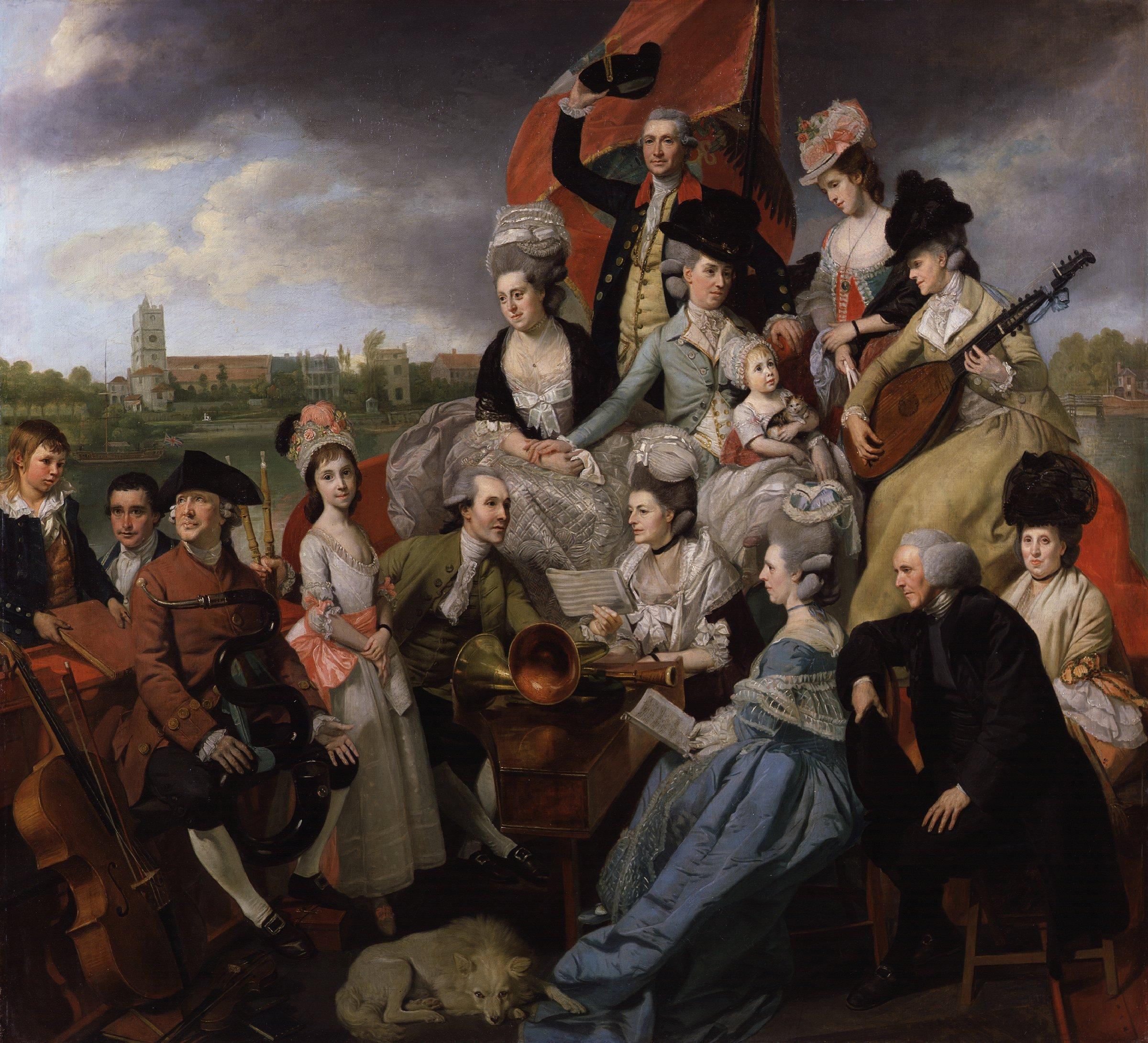
The Sharp Family by Johann Zoffany, 1781

=== Painting by Zoffany ===
While Sharp and his immediate family were living on the Thames in a barge, a wider family group, consisting principally of Sharp and several of his brothers and sisters, was in the habit of meeting regularly to play music to entertain guest audiences. Although other musicians joined them, the core players were Sharp himself (organ and French horn) his brother James (bassoon and serpent), his younger brother Granville (clarinet, oboe, kettledrums, flute and harp), and several sisters who sang and played the piano. The family sometimes also travelled by barge on "musical expeditions", organized by Granville, which could last for days, and one such expedition is known to have travelled more than 280 miles. Sharp's brother James was an ironmonger in Leadenhall Street.

Sharp commissioned an important conversation piece painting by Johann Zoffany which shows The Family of William Sharp: Musical Party on the Thames. The painting is believed to have been painted between 1779 and 1781, and is now in the National Portrait Gallery in London. Zoffany composed the painting in a series of sittings with each of the subjects, to take their separate portraits, but none of his sketches or compositional studies views are known to survive. The first of these sittings took place in November 1779, the last over a year later, and the finished painting was ready to be exhibited by at the Royal Academy's exhibition in Spring 1781. William Sharp is shown at the top of the painting, with his hat raised in one hand. He wears the red collar of a Windsor uniform (which he would have been entitled to wear as a member of the Royal Household) and is not holding the French horn he usually played, which rests near the piano. Some sources describe Sharp as "surgeon to King George III", but no contemporary sources have been found that confirm these claims.

The painting, which has also been called The Sharp Family on a Yacht on the River Thames, was inherited by Sharp's daughter Mary and thereafter by her Lloyd-Baker descendants of Hardwicke.

== Epitaph ==
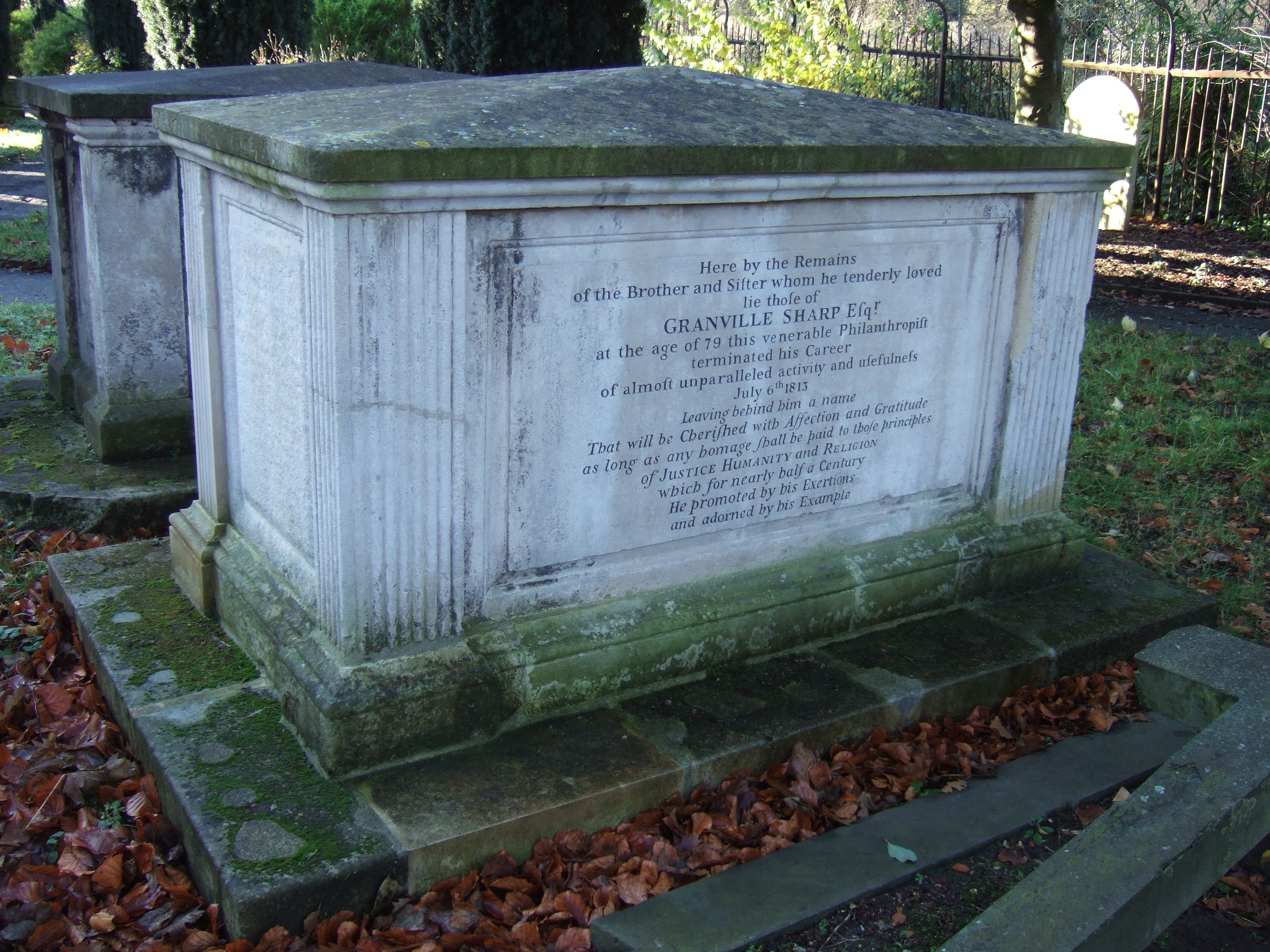
The Sharp tombs at All Saints', Fulham.

Sharp died in 1810 and was buried at All Saints' Church, Fulham, as "William Sharp, Esq., late of Fulham House, in this parish, who died March 17, 1810, aged 81", with his sister Elizabeth Prouse, "late of Wicken Park, Northamptonshire, who died Feb. 23, 1810, aged 77". The epitaph on their shared tomb reads

"Endeared to their family connections and society by an amiableness of Character, which has seldom been equalled, and to each other, by a degree of mutual attachment, which has never been surpassed. They were lovely and pleasant in their lives, and in their deaths they were not divided.

The allusion is to the deaths of Jonathan and Saul: "Saul and Jonathan were lovely and pleasant in their lives, and in their death they were not divided: they were swifter than eagles, they were stronger than lions."

On 6 July 1813, Granville Sharp died and was buried beside them, the memorial on his tomb stating that "Here, by the Remains of the Brother and Sister he tenderly loved, lie those of GRANVILLE SHARP, ESQ."

A reredos erected a generation later in All Saints' Church, Fulham, reads: "This reredos was erected in 1845 to the honor of God and in memory of William Sharp of Fulham House, Surgeon to King George III, Catherine his wife, daughter of Thomas Barwick, Granville Sharp, his brother..."
