= Thomas Sharp (priest) =

English churchman and biographer (1693–1758)

Thomas Sharp (1693–1758) was an English churchman, known as a biographer and theological writer, archdeacon of Northumberland from 1723.

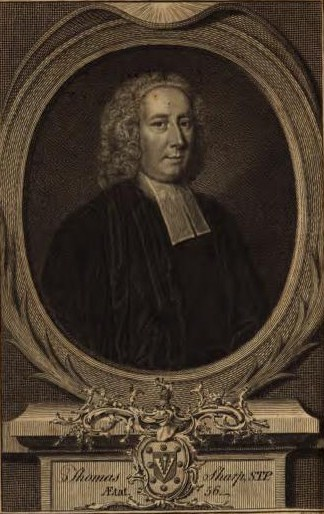
Thomas Sharp.

== Life ==
A younger son of John Sharp, archbishop of York, he was born on 12 December 1693. At the age of 15 he was admitted to Trinity College, Cambridge, where he graduated B.A. in 1712, M.A. in 1716, and was elected to a fellowship.

Sharp became chaplain to Archbishop William Dawes, a prebendary of Southwell Minster, and a member of the Gentlemen's Society at Spalding. He was also prebendary of Wistow in York Minster (29 April 1719), appointed rector of Rothbury, Northumberland in 1720, and collated archdeacon of Northumberland on 27 February 1722/3. He was created D.D. at Cambridge in 1729. On 1 December 1732 he was installed in the tenth prebend of Durham Cathedral at Durham, and in 1755 he succeeded Thomas Mangey as official to the dean and chapter of the cathedral.

Sharp died at Durham on 16 March 1758, and was buried at the west end of the cathedral in the chapel called the Galilee.

== Works ==
His main works were:

- A Vindication of Bishop Taylor from the injurious misrepresentation of him by the Author of the Letter to the Clergy of the Church of England in the county of Northumberland, 1733. The reference is to Jeremy Taylor. Reply to an anonymous work by William Hewetson. The controversy continued and involved Joseph Besse.
- An Enquiry about the Lawfulness of Eating Blood. Occasion'd by Revelation examin'd with Candour. ... By a Prebendary of York, London, 1733.
- A Defence of the Enquiry about the Lawfulness of Eating Blood, London, 1734.
- Opinion on a Proposal for instituting a Protestant Convent, 1737; printed in his Life of Archbishop Sharp, ii. 281.
- Two Dissertations concerning the Etymology and Scripture-Meaning of the Hebrew words Elohim and Berith. Occasioned by some Notions lately advanced in relation to them, London, 1751. Prompted by John Hutchinson and Alexander Stopford Catcott, this work elicited replies from Julius Bate and Benjamin Holloway, and these two writers were answered by György Kalmár, who defended Sharp. The latter issued a "review and defence" of the dissertations (pt. i. 1754, pt. ii. and iii. 1755). Sharp's works in this controversy were closely supervised by Thomas Secker.
- The Rubric in the Book of Common Prayer and the Canons of the Church of England, so far as they relate to the Parochial Clergy, considered, London, 1753; 1787; Oxford, 1834 and 1853.
- Discourses touching the antiquity of the Hebrew Tongue and Character, London, 1755.
- Mr. Hutchinson's Exposition of Cherubim, and his Hypothesis concerning them examined, London, 1755. Walter Hodges published a reply.
- Sermons on several occasions, 1763.
- Discourses on Preaching; or, directions towards attaining the best manner of discharging the duties of the Pulpit, 3rd edit. London, 1787.
- The Life of John Sharp, D.D., Lord Archbishop of York. Edited by Thomas Newcome, 2 vols., London, 1825.

A collected edition of Sharp's Works appeared in 1763; his correspondence with Mrs. Catherine Cockburn on moral virtue and moral obligation was published in 1743.

== Family ==
Sharp married, on 19 June 1722, Judith, daughter of Sir George Wheler (she died on 2 July 1757), and had 14 children. Their eldest son, John Sharp, followed Thomas as Archdeacon of Northumberland, and was an innovative charity administrator as senior trustee of the estates of Bishop Lord Crew. Their ninth son was abolitionist Granville Sharp, and another son, William Sharp, was known as a surgeon.

== Notes ==
Attribution

This article incorporates text from a publication now in the public domain: "Sharp, Thomas (1693-1758)". Dictionary of National Biography. London: Smith, Elder & Co. 1885–1900.
