= Maria A. Chalon =

British painter

Maria A. Chalon, self-portrait

Maria Ann Chalon (2 September 1797 – 8 April 1877) was a British painter of miniatures. She was Portrait Paintress to his Royal Highness, the Duke of York, and is considered one of the most talented and successful female British miniaturists of the early nineteenth century.

== Life ==
Maria Ann Chalon was born on 2 September 1797 in London, England. She was the second child of Henry Barnard Chalon, painter, and Sarah Ward. Her uncles were James Ward, artist, and William Ward, engraver. Her grandfather, Jan Chalon, was an artist, collector and engraver and her great-aunt, Christina Chalon, was a painter and draughtswoman.

In 1840 she married Henry Moseley, a painter and engraver. From this time on she was known as Mrs. Henry Moseley. They lived in Fitzroy Square. Firstly, at 19 Howland Street, then, a few years later, they moved to 52 Charlotte Street. She lived in London for much of her life but spent some time at Hardwicke Court in Gloucestershire.

She died on 8 April 1877, aged 79, at 39 Winchester Street, Pimlico, London. By that time she was living with her niece, Annett Watson, who was the daughter of her sister, Frederica.

== Career ==
Surrounded by several artistic family members, Chalon developed an interest in painting from an early age. She was self-taught with occasional instruction from her father and her friends. Chalon's talent rapidly progressed and she soon shared in the ‘honours and rewards bestowed’ by the Society for the Encouragement of Arts. She was awarded the Silver Palette at the age of 15. She then turned her talents to miniature-painting as a profession.

The productions of Miss Chalon are distinguished by a careful and graceful execution, a happy style of colouring, and, what is very necessary to a portrait-painter, a fidelity that gives confidence to those who have patronized her. – D.D., The Lady's Monthly Museum

She is considered one of the most talented and successful female British miniaturists of the early nineteenth century. She painted miniatures for Prince Frederick, Duke of York and was appointed ‘Portrait Paintress to his Royal Highness’ in the 1820s. Many of her figures were respected society figures. Her work was sometimes said to resemble William Charles Ross.

She exhibited using the name Maria A. Chalon, or Miss M. A. Chalon, during the years 1819 – 1840 and then using Mrs. Henry Moseley, or Mrs. H. Moseley, during 1841 – 1866 . Although some of her works were in oils, she worked mostly in watercolours. She exhibited no less than 149 works at the Royal Academy of Arts and also exhibited at the Royal Society of British Artists (1834), the Suffolk Street Gallery, the British Institution (1863), and the Society of Women Artists (1857–1862). She was a member of the Society of Women Artists from 1859 until 1870.

She continued to paint until shortly before her death. In 1872, aged 75, she painted a miniature of Harriett King Wells, the wife of Colonel Joseph Wells (Davenport), copied from one of her own pictures made in 1828.

== Awards ==
- The Silver Palette for St James the Elder, 1813
