= John Dawes (disambiguation) =

John Dawes (1940–2021) was a Welsh rugby union footballer.

John Dawes may also refer to:

- Sir John Dawes, 1st Baronet (1644–1671), of the Dawes baronets
- Johnny Dawes (born 1964), British rock climber
- John Dawes (MP)

== See also ==
- John Dawe (1928–2013), Australian sailor
- Dawes (surname)
