= Jonathan Strong =

Jonathan Strong may refer to:

- Jonathan Strong (author) (1944–), an American author
- Jonathan Strong (slave) (c. 1747/8–1773), a West Indian slave
