= Robert Spearman =

English theologian

Robert Spearman (1703–1761) was an English theologian, known as a Hutchinsonian.

== Life ==
He was the eldest son of Robert Spearman, attorney of Durham, by his wife Hannah, only daughter of William Webster, merchant, of Stockton-on-Tees. He studied at Durham School and Corpus Christi College, Oxford, but left without taking a degree. He then lived at Old Acres, Sedgefield.

A pupil of John Hutchinson, Spearman survived him, edited his works, and wrote his life. He was the dedicatee of Two Dissertations concerning the Etymology and Scripture-Meaning of the Hebrew words Elohim and Berith (1751) by Thomas Sharp, with whom he was on good terms.

Spearman died on 20 October 1761, leaving only female issue by his wife Anne, daughter of Robert Sharpe of Hawthorn, County Durham.

== Works ==
Spearman's own writings were:

- An Enquiry after Philosophy and Theology, tending to show when and whence mankind came at the knowledge of these two important points, Edinburgh, 1755; 2nd ed. Dublin, 1757 (a polemic against Newtonian physics);
- Letters to a Friend concerning the Septuagint Translation and the Heathen Mythology, Edinburgh, 1759 (an attempt to derive all mythologies from a primeval revelation).
