= Jeffery Ekins =

English churchman

Jeffery Ekins D.D. (died 1791) was an English churchman, Dean of Carlisle Cathedral from 1782, known also as a poet.

== Life ==
He was a native of Barton-Seagrave, Northamptonshire, where his father, the Rev. Jeffery Ekins, M.A., was rector. He received his education at Eton College. In 1749 he was elected to King's College, Cambridge, where he obtained a fellowship. He graduated B.A. in 1755 and M.A. in 1758. In early life he was the close companion of Richard Cumberland.

On leaving university Ekins became one of the assistant masters of Eton College, where he was tutor to Frederick Howard, 5th Earl of Carlisle. Subsequently he was chaplain to the Earl of Carlisle when lord-lieutenant of Ireland. He was inducted to the rectory of Quainton, Buckinghamshire, 30 March 1761, on the presentation of his father. In 1775, resigning Quainton, he was instituted to the rectory of Morpeth, Northumberland, on the presentation of the Earl of Carlisle; and in February 1777 he was instituted to the rectory of Sedgefield, Co. Durham. In 1781 he was created D.D. at Cambridge; and in 1782 he was installed Dean of Carlisle, on the advancement of Thomas Percy to the see of Dromore.

Ekins died at Parson's Green on 20 November 1791, and was buried in the chancel of All Saints Church, Fulham. His sister Elizabeth, wife of John Hatsell (Clerk of the House of Commons, 1768–1820) was buried alongside him in 1804.

== Works ==
Ekins wrote:

- "Florio; or the Pursuit of Happiness", a drama, manuscript. This work, admired by Cumberland, is not known to be extant.
- A manuscript poem on "Dreams".

He published:

- The Loves of Medea and Jason; a poem in three books translated from the Greek of Apollonius Rhodius's Argonautics, London, 1771; 2nd edit. 1772.
- Poems, London, 1810, pp. 134, including the preceding work and a number of 'Miscellaneous Pieces'. Sixty copies were printed of this collection.

== Family ==
Ekins married in 1766 Anne, daughter of Philip Baker of Coulston, Wiltshire, and sister of the wife of his brother, John Ekins, dean of Salisbury. They had four sons and three daughters. Admiral Sir Charles Ekins was their son. Their daughter Anne Ekins (1785/6–1886) married John Hooper Holder (1779–1856) as his second wife, in 1812, and had a daughter Emily Janetta.

== Newton Nachlass ==
Papers relating to Isaac Newton's occult studies came into the hands of Ekins in the middle of the 18th century, and remained in the family until 1872. At that point they went to New College, Oxford.

Church of England titles
Preceded by Thomas Percy	Dean of Carlisle; 1782 – 1791	Succeeded by Isaac Milner
