= Mary Sharp =

Niece of British abolitionist Granville Sharp

- Born: 1778
- Died: 1812 (aged 33–34)
- Known for: Ardent abolitionist; niece of Granville Sharp
- Movement: Abolitionism
- Spouse: Thomas John Lloyd Baker (m. 1800)
- Relatives: Granville Sharp (uncle)

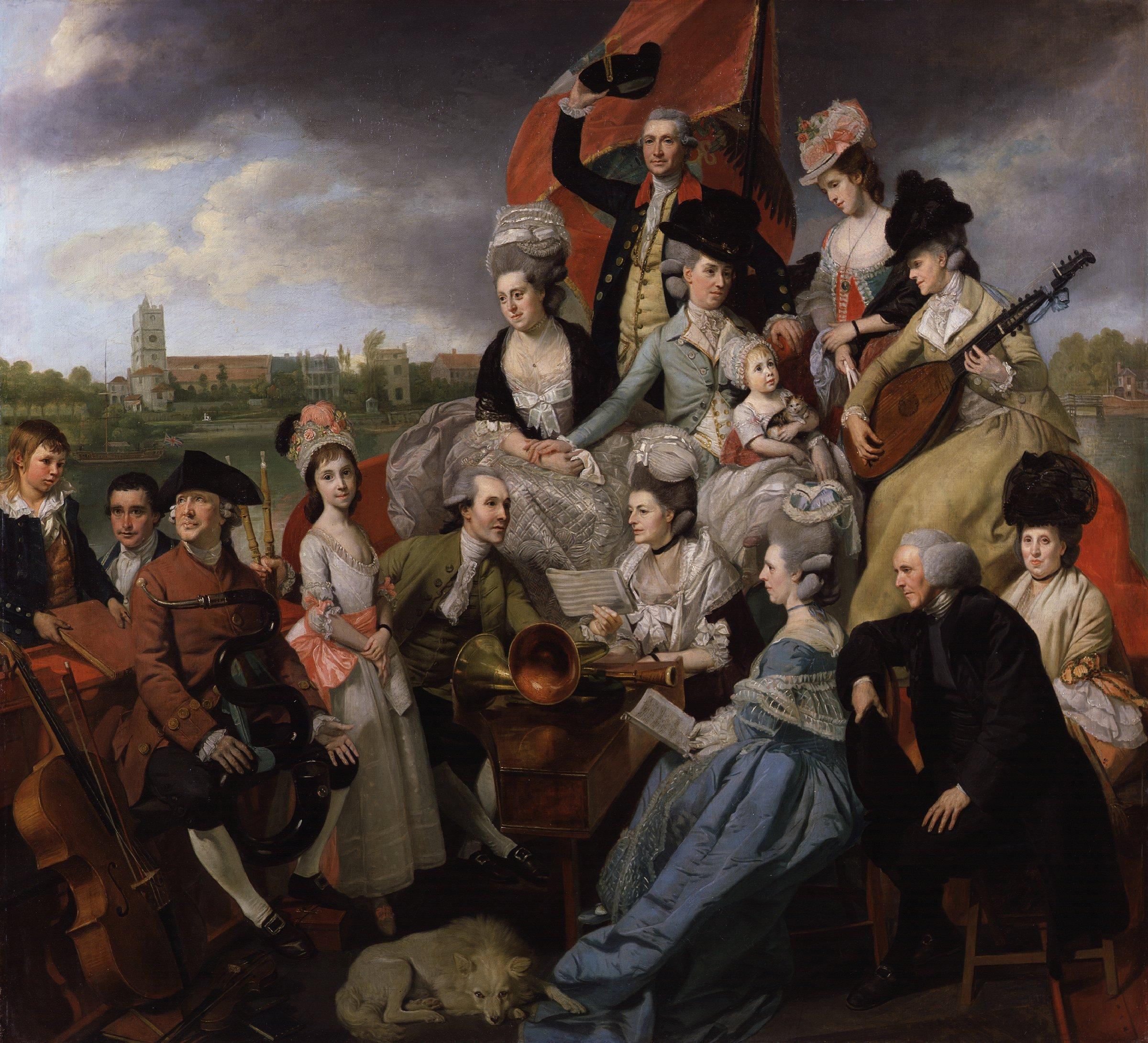
In The Sharp Family by Johann Zoffany, Mary Sharp is the toddler holding a kitten

Mary Sharp (1778–1812), also called Mary Lloyd-Baker or Mary Lloyd Baker, was a niece of the British abolitionist Granville Sharp (1735 – 1813). Mary Sharp herself was an ardent abolitionist, active in campaigns to abolish the Atlantic slave trade.

She married Thomas John Lloyd Baker of Uley, Gloucestershire in 1800. After her death, Baker remarried and built Hardwicke Court.

== Places ==
Mary Sharp College in Winchester, Tennessee, was named for her.
