= Julius Bate =

British priest (1711–1771)

Julius Bate (1711–1771) was an English divine, known as a Hutchinsonian and Hebraist.

== Life ==
Bate was one of the ten children of the Rev. Richard Bate, by his wife, Elizabeth Stanhope. He entered St John's College, Cambridge, became B.A. 1730, and M.A. 1740.

Bate became a disciple of John Hutchinson, and was a prominent member of the Hutchinsonian school. Hutchinson was patronised by the Duke of Somerset, who allowed him to appoint Bate to the rectory of Sutton near the duke's seat of Petworth. Bate attended Hutchinson in his last illness (1737), and was associated with Robert Spearman in the publication of Hutchinson's works.

Bate died at Arundel, 20 January 1771.

== Works ==
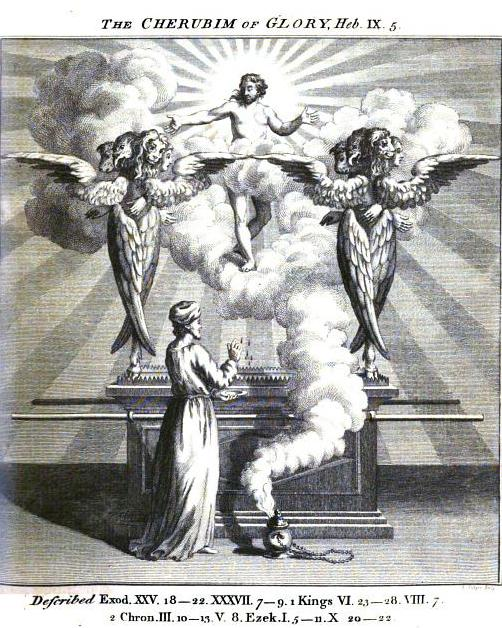
Cherubim, illustration from Bate's A new and literal translation, from the Hebrew, of the Pentateuch of Moses, and of the historical books of the Old Testament, to the end of the second book of Kings (1773).

Bate, in 1745, wrote a pamphlet called Remarks upon Mr. Warburton's remarks, showing that the ancients knew there was a future state, and that the Jews were not under an equal providence. It provoked William Warburton to calls him (Works, xii. 58) "Zany to a mountebank" (i.e., to Hutchinson), and to class him with Richard Grey as an "impotent railer". Bate published other pamphlets in defence of Hutchinson's mysticism, and on the corresponding interpretation of the Hebrew text. His major work is Critica Hebræa, or a Hebrew-English Dictionary without points, 1767; objection to the pointing of Hebrew was one of the characteristic tenets of the school. Bate also wrote, The Integrity of the Hebrew Text, and Many Passages of Scripture, Vindicated from the Objections and Misconstructions of Mr. Kennicott.
