= Hardwicke Court =

Country house in Gloucestershire, England

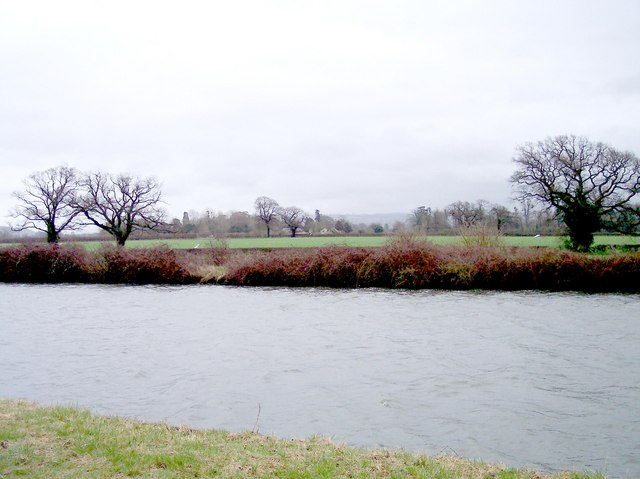
- View of Hardwick Court in the distance from the Gloucester & Sharpness Canal

- Location in Gloucestershire
- 51°48′13″N 02°18′31″W
- Location: Hardwicke, Gloucestershire, England

Hardwicke Court is a Grade II* listed country house in Hardwicke, Gloucestershire, England. The house is Late Georgian in style. It was designed by Sir Robert Smirke and built in 1816–17, although a canal still remains from the early 18th-century gardens of the Trye family. Hardwicke Court was built for Thomas John Lloyd Baker (sometimes written Lloyd-Baker), widower of Mary Sharp. A bust of Sharp's uncle, abolitionist Granville Sharp, is on display at the house.

The house and gardens are occasionally open to the public in the summer, and the Lloyd Baker family still resides there.
