= All Saints Church, Fulham =

Church in England

Coordinates: 51.4686°N 0.2117°W

All Saints' Church
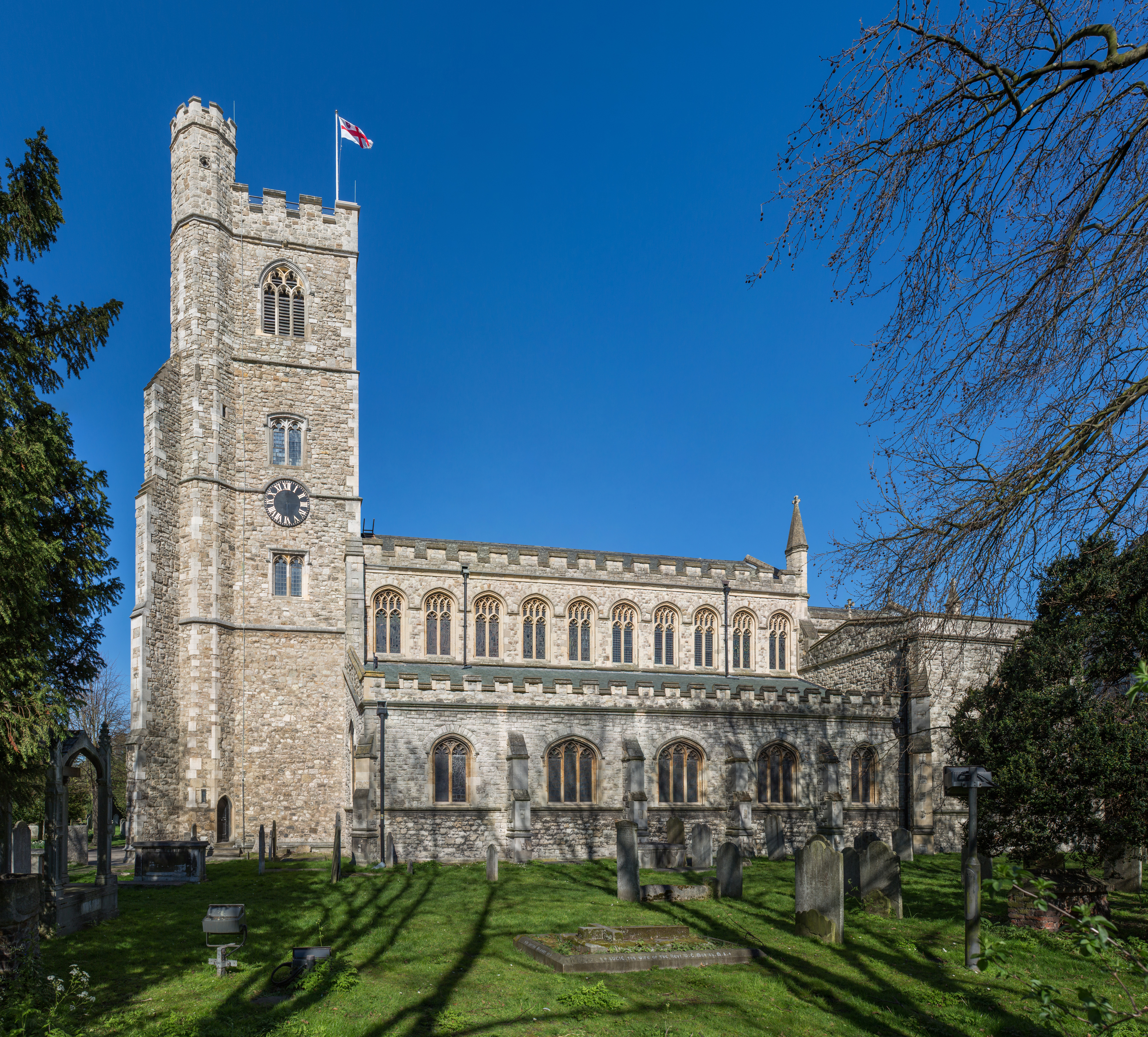
- All Saints' Church
- Address: Fulham High St.
- Denomination: Church of England
- Previous denomination: Catholic
- Churchmanship: Affirming Catholic
- Website: Official website

Architecture
- Heritage designation: Grade II*

Administration
- Province: Canterbury
- Diocese: London
- Archdeaconry: Middlesex
- Deanery: Hammersmith and Fulham
- Parish: All Saints' Fulham

Clergy
- Vicar(s): Revd Peter Dobson, Vicar of Fulham
- Priest: Revd Natasha McMichael associate vicar

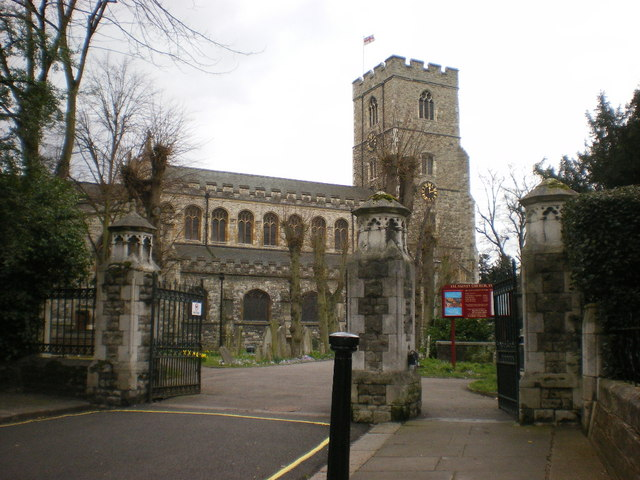
Entrance

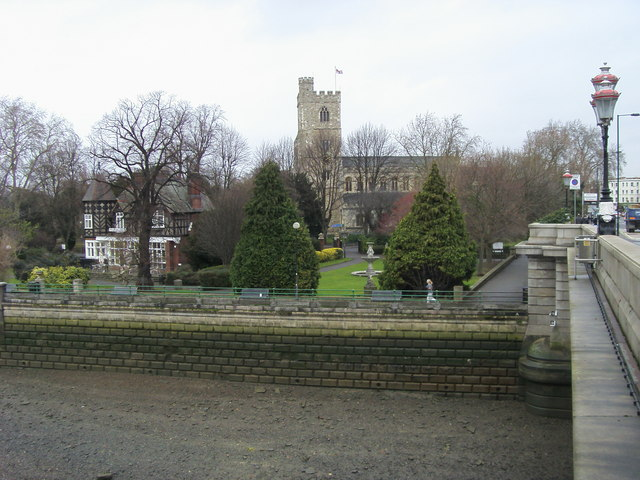
View from Putney Bridge

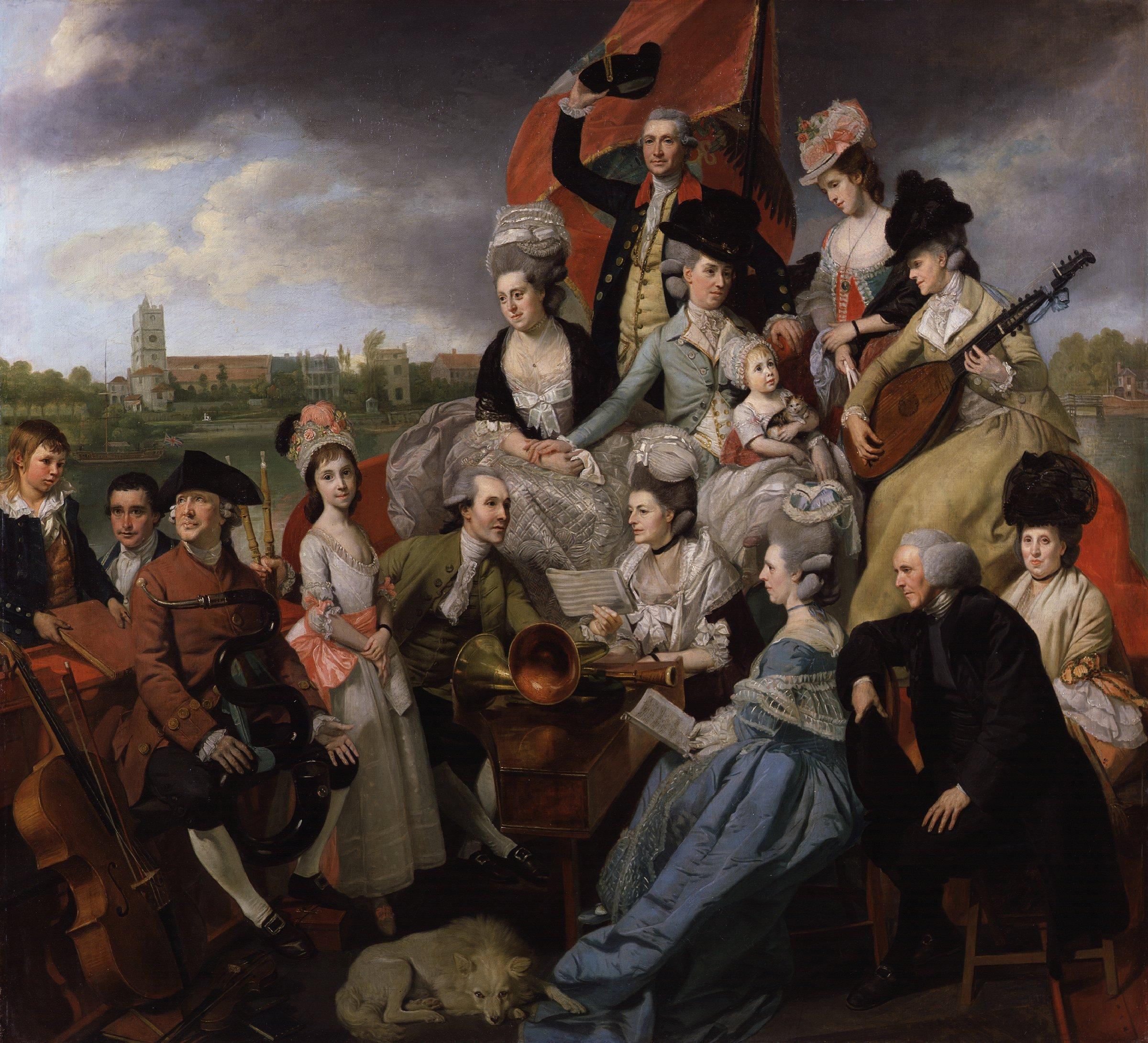
The Sharp Family by Johann Zoffany, c.1791. All Saints is depicted in the background.

All Saints' Church is the ancient parish church of Fulham, in the County of Middlesex, pre-dating the Reformation. The parish was founded in the precinct of Fulham Manor, currently adjacent to it, which was in the possession of the Bishops of London, since the 8th century. Hence it began as the parish church of the bishops of London and several of them are buried there. It is now an Anglican church in Fulham, London, sited close to the River Thames, beside the northern approach to Putney Bridge. The church tower and interior nave and chancel are Grade II* listed.

== History ==
There has been a church on the same site for more than 900 years. Barbara Denny, a historian of London, writes that the first record of a church here dates from 1154 in the rolls of a tithe dispute. Apart from the tower, construction of which began in 1440, the present church building dates from the late Victorian period, having been rebuilt in 1880–1881 by Sir Arthur Blomfield using squared rubblestone, ashlar dressings and windows in the Perpendicular style. The church retains many memorials from the earlier church along with a plaque to the First World War dead of the 25th (County of London) Cyclist Battalion of the London Regiment, whose drill hall was at Fulham House from 1908 onwards.

The building and its churchyard are next to Bishop's Park, overlooking the River Thames. The church has a long association with the bishops of London as lords of the manor of Fulham, and is the burial place for many of them. The nearby Fulham Palace is the former manor of Fulham and the former residence of the bishops of London.

Putney Bridge, like its predecessor Fulham Bridge, is unique in that it is the only bridge in Britain to have a church at both ends: the ancient St Mary's Church is located in Putney on the south bank, and All Saints' Church, Fulham, is on the north bank.

== Notable burials ==
=== Bishops of London ===
Due to the proximity of All Saints to Fulham Palace, the ancient residence of the Bishop of London, several bishops of London were buried at All Saints.

- Humphrey Henchman (d. 1675)
- Henry Compton (d. 1713)
- John Robinson (d. 1723)
- Edmund Gibson (d. 1748)
- Thomas Sherlock (d. 1761)
- Thomas Hayter (d. 1762)
- Richard Terrick (d. 1777)
- Robert Lowth (d. 1787)
- John Randolph (d. 1813)
- Charles James Blomfield (d. 1857)
- John Jackson (d. 1885)

=== Other burials ===
- William John Burchell (1781–1863) – explorer, naturalist, traveller, artist, and author
- Sir William Butts – physician to King Henry VIII
- Jeffery Ekins – Dean of Carlisle, 1782–1791
- Elizabeth Hatsell – wife of John Hatsell (Clerk of the House of Commons 1768–1820) and sister of Jeffery Ekins
- Henry Holland – architect
- Nathaniel Kent – agriculturalist
- Alexander Marshal (circa 1620–1682) – merchant, gardener and botanical illustrator
- John Mordaunt, 1st Viscount Mordaunt – royalist, prominent in the English Civil War
- John Saris – captain on the first English voyage to land in Japan
- Granville Sharp – abolitionist. His tomb is Grade II listed
- William Sharp – surgeon
- Sir William Withers – Lord Mayor of London
- George London – landscape gardener and gardener to Bishop Compton

== In the media ==
The church was featured in the film The Omen, in a scene which begins in Bishop's Park, and ends with a bizarre accident where a priest (played by Patrick Troughton) is impaled by a lightning conductor on the top of the tower that is dislodged when it is hit by lightning.

In 2017, the Christmas Day service from the church was shown on BBC Television.
