= Charles Ekins =

Royal Navy Admiral (1768–1855)

Admiral Sir Charles Ekins GCB
- Born: 1768
- Died: 2 July 1855 (aged 86–87); 69 Cadogan Place, London
- Military career
- Allegiance: United Kingdom
- Branch: Royal Navy
- Service years: 1781–1855
- Rank: Admiral
- Commands: HMS Ferret; HMS Amphitrite; HMS Beaulieu; HMS Defence; HMS Superb
- Conflicts: American Revolutionary War; Battle of Dogger Bank; Relief of Gibraltar; French Revolutionary Wars; Napoleonic Wars; Battle of Copenhagen; Bombardment of Algiers
- Awards: Knight Grand Cross of the Bath; Knight 3rd Class of the Order of William of the Netherlands

Admiral Sir Charles Ekins GCB (1768 – 2 July 1855) was an officer of the Royal Navy who served in the Fourth Anglo-Dutch War, the French Revolutionary and Napoleonic Wars, and rose to the rank of admiral.

== Life ==
Ekins was the son of Dr. Jeffery Ekins, dean of Carlisle, and nephew of Dr. John Ekins, dean of Salisbury (1768–1809), and was born presumably at Quainton, Buckinghamshire, where his father was then rector. He entered the Royal Navy in March 1781, on board the 74-gun HMS Berwick, under the command of the Hon. Keith Stewart. In Berwick he was present at the Battle of Dogger Bank on 5 August 1781, and afterwards went with Captain Stewart to HMS Cambridge, which was one of the fleet under Lord Howe that relieved Gibraltar in 1782.

After continuous service on the Mediterranean and home stations for the next eight years, he was promoted to the rank of lieutenant on 20 October 1790. During the next five years he was mainly employed in the West Indies. Early in 1795 he came home in the 98-gun HMS Boyne, bearing the flag of Sir John Jervis, and was in her when she was burnt at Spithead on 1 May. On 18 June he was promoted to the command of the sloop HMS Ferret in the North Sea, from which he was appointed to HMS Echo, supposed to be at the Cape of Good Hope, but found, on his arrival, to have been condemned and broken up. He returned to England in command of Havik, one of the Dutch prizes taken at the capitulation of Saldanha Bay. After his return to Britain, he was advanced to post rank 22 December 1796.

In August 1797 he was appointed to the 28-gun HMS Amphitrite, and in her was actively employed in the West Indies until March 1801, when, after a severe attack of yellow fever, he was sent home with despatches. From 1804 to 1806 he commanded the 40-gun HMS Beaulieu; and from 1806 to 1811 the 74-gun HMS Defence, in which he took part in the expedition against Copenhagen in 1807, in the operations on the coast of Portugal in 1808, and in the Baltic cruise of 1809. In September 1815 he commissioned the 74-gun HMS Superb, and commanded her in the bombardment of Algiers, on 27 August 1816, when he was wounded. He later, together with the other captains engaged, was nominated a Companion of the Bath, and by the King of the Netherlands a knight 3rd class of the Order of William of the Netherlands.

Superb was paid off in October 1818, and Ekins had no further service afloat; though he became in course of seniority rear-admiral on 12 August 1819, vice-admiral on 22 July 1830, and admiral on 23 November 1841; and was made a Knight Commander of the Bath on 8 June 1831, and a Knight Grand Cross of the Bath on 7 April 1852. He died at 69 Cadogan Place, London on 2 July 1855. He married, in 1800, Priscilla, daughter of Thomas Parlby (1727–1802) of Stone Hall, Plymouth, Devon.

== Works ==
Ekins was the author of Naval Battles of Great Britain from the Accession of the illustrious House of Hanover to the Battle of Navarin reviewed (1824; 2nd edit. 1828). He wrote also a pamphlet on the round stem controversy in the form of a letter to Sir Robert Seppings (1824), and developed a system of maritime signalling (London: Thomas Curson Hansard, 1838).

== See also ==
- O'Byrne, William Richard (1849). "Ekins, Charles" . A Naval Biographical Dictionary . John Murray – via Wikisource.
