= Jonathan Strong (slave) =

West Indian slave

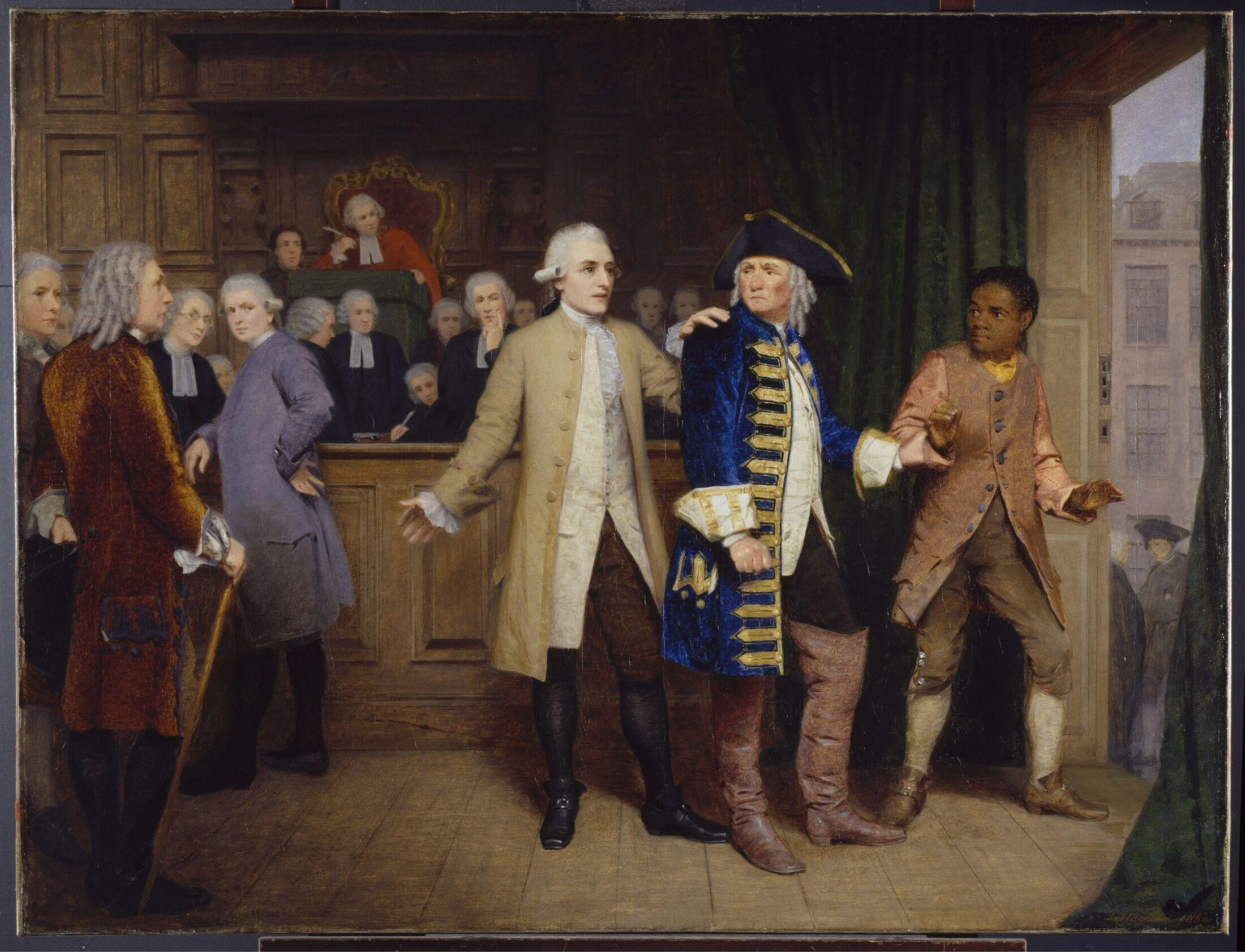
Granville Sharp the Abolitionist Rescuing a Slave from the Hands of His Master, oil on canvas, by James Hayllar, 1864. Depicts Granville Sharp defending the slave, Jonathan Strong

Jonathan Strong (c. 1747/8–1773) was an enslaved person and subject of one of the earliest legal cases relating to slavery in Britain and the British abolitionist movement.

It is not known where Strong was born, but he was brought to Britain from the British colony of Barbados by a Barbadian lawyer and slave trader, David Lisle. On 22 July 1765, when he was fifteen or sixteen years old, Strong was baptised at St Leonard's, Shoreditch. Many enslaved black people at this time thought that they became free upon baptism, and it is possibly this fact that prompted his enslaver to severely assault him and leave Strong on the street. Strong later recalled that he could barely see or walk as a result of his injuries, but he made his way to the house of William Sharp, a surgeon who treated poor Londoners at his house free of charge. There, he was seen by William's brother Granville. William said that Strong "seemed ready to die" when he first arrived, and he and his brother both gave Strong money for clothes and food. William arranged for him to be treated at St Bartholomew's Hospital, where Strong received over four months of treatment.

The Sharps paid for his treatment and, when he was fit enough, found him employment as an errand runner with a Quaker apothecary friend of theirs at a building near William's office. Strong worked there until Lisle saw Strong serving as a footman on the pharmacist's coach. Viewing Strong as his property, Lisle sold him to a Jamaican slave trader, James Kerr, and had him kidnapped and placed in a city jail. Strong got a message to Granville Sharp, who immediately took the legality of his detention up with the Lord Mayor of London who in turn convened those laying claim to Strong. In court, Kerr's attorney produced the bill of sales from when Lisle sold Strong to Kerr. That was not enough to convince the Lord Mayor because Strong was imprisoned without habeas corpus or a clear cause, and so he liberated Strong. Afterwards, a West India captain named David Laird grabbed Strong's arm and claimed he would take him as Kerr's property. Sharp, at the suggestion of Thomas Beech, the Coroner of London, threatened to charge Laird with assault should he attempt to take Strong by force. Laird let go of Strong and everyone who had been summoned departed without further dispute.

Lisle challenged Granville Sharp to a duel, but he declined, telling Lisle that he could expect satisfaction from the law. Kerr started a lawsuit against Sharp, claiming that he unlawfully had deprived him of Strong, his property. However, as a result of Sharp's legal arguments claiming that the laws of England did not sanction slavery, Kerr's lawyers decided against pursuing the case, and Kerr had to pay treble costs in 1774, after Strong's death, for wasting the court's time.

Strong remained free until he died in London on 19 April 1773, aged 25. His young age at death may have been a result of the beatings given by Lisle.

== See also ==
- James Somerset
  - Somerset v Stewart
