= John Sharp (bishop) =

Archbishop of York from 1691 to 1714

The Most Reverend and Right Honourable John Sharp
- Archbishop of York
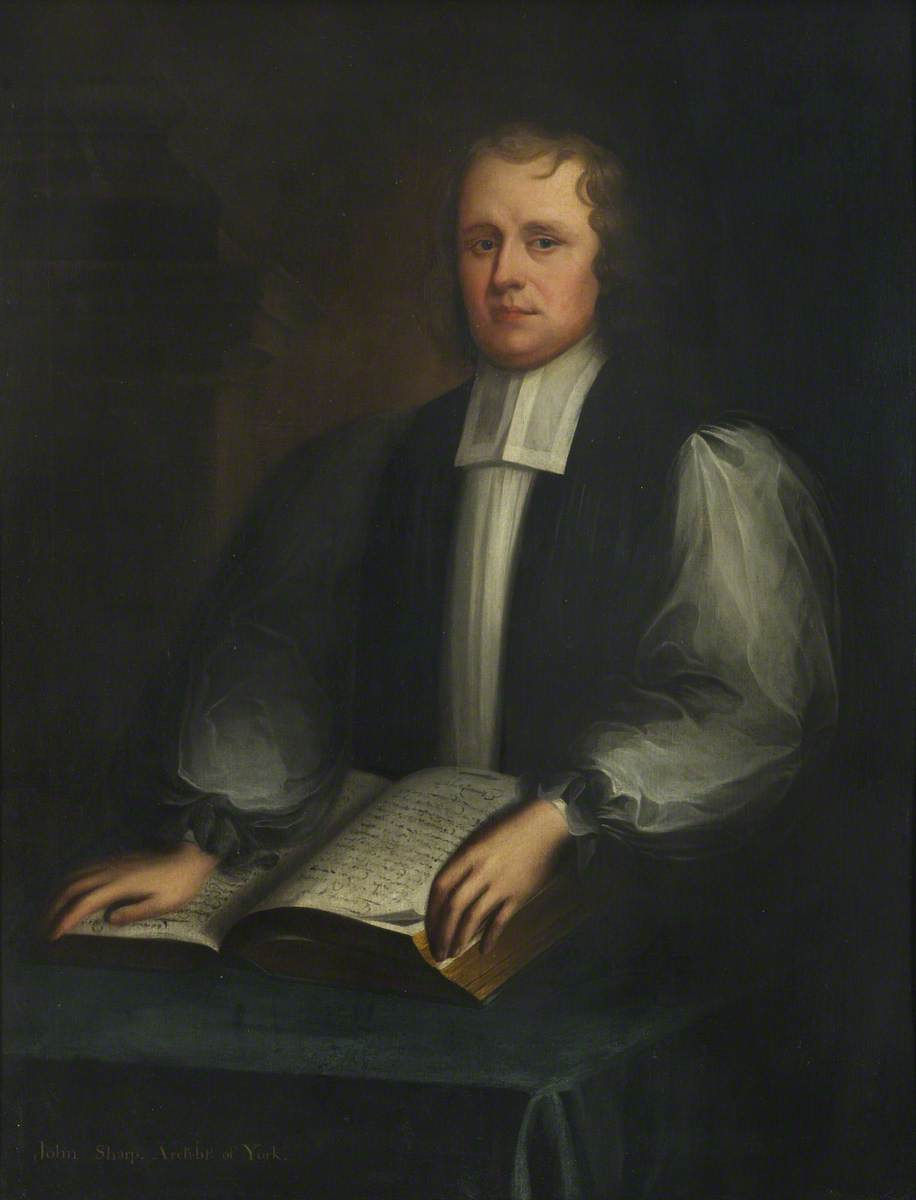
- Archdiocese: York
- Installed: 1691
- Term ended: 1714 (death)
- Predecessor: Thomas Lamplugh
- Successor: Sir William Dawes, Bt.
- Other posts: Dean of Norwich (1681–89); Dean of Canterbury (1689–91)

Personal details
- Born: 16 February 1645 Bradford, West Riding of Yorkshire, England
- Died: 2 February 1714 (aged 68) Bath, Somerset, England
- Buried: York Minster
- Denomination: Anglican
- Spouse: Elizabeth Palmer (m.1676)
- Education: Bradford Grammar School
- Alma mater: Christ's College, Cambridge

John Sharp (16 February 1645 – 2 February 1714) was an English divine who served as Archbishop of York.

== Biography ==
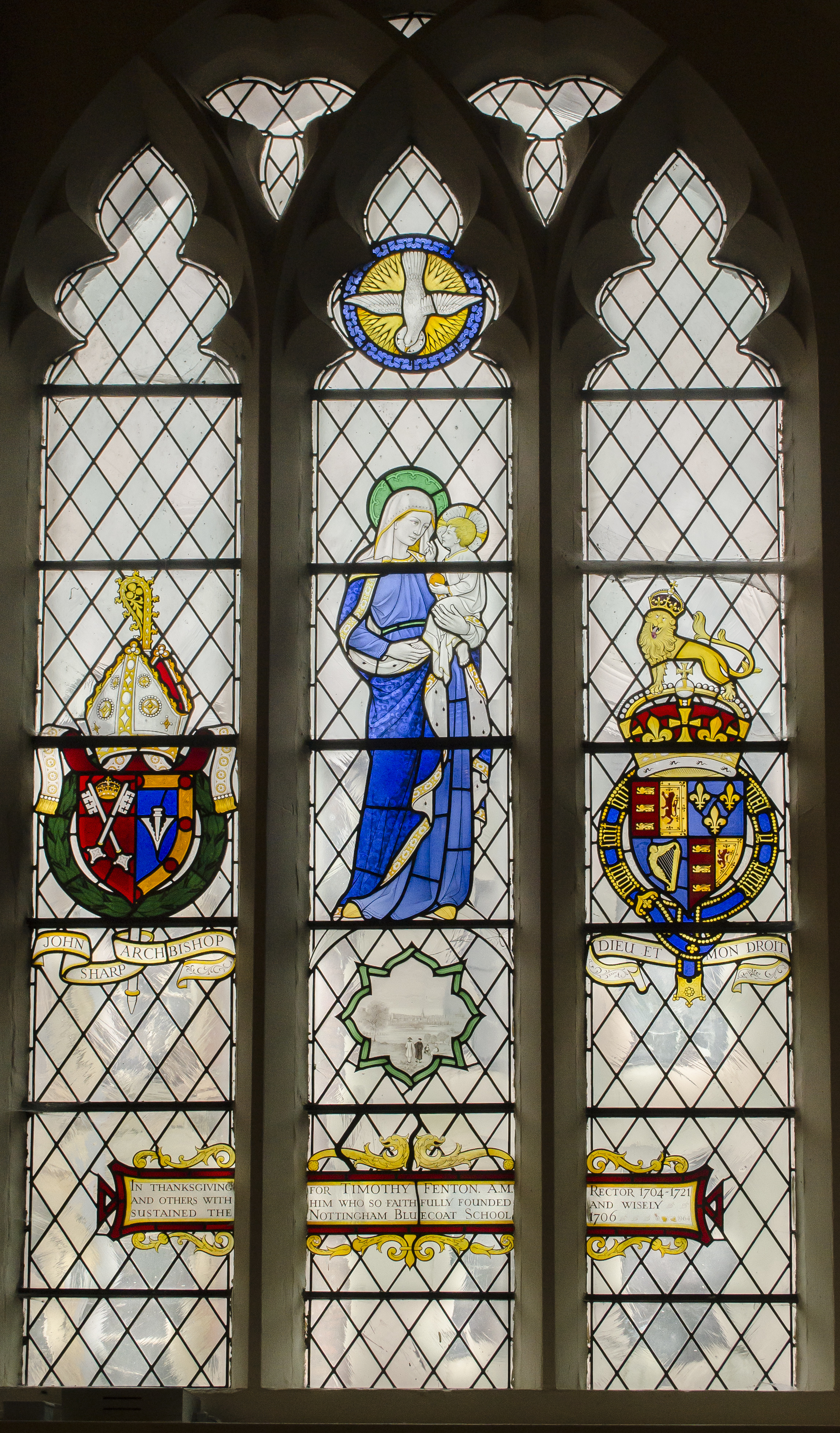
1964 stained glass in St Peter's Church, Nottingham, showing the arms of Bishop John Sharp (See of York impaling Sharp)

Memoirs of the Secret Services of John Macky Esq.:

John Archbishop of York, is Dr. Sharp, he was a Rector of St Giles in the Fields, in the Reign of King James; when, preaching warmly against Popery, he was silenced, and the Bishop of London (Dr. Compton) suspended from his office, for not turning him out. He was made by King William Archbishop of York; and this Queen hath made him her Lord Almoner. He is one of the greatest Ornaments of the Church of England, of great Piety and Learning; a Black Man, and fifty-five Years old.

John Sharp was born at Bradford, the eldest son of Thomas Sharp, a salter, and Dorothy Weddal. His father was a Puritan who enjoyed the favour of Thomas Fairfax and inculcated in him Calvinist and Low Church doctrines, while his mother, being a strong royalist, instructed him in the liturgy of the Book of Common Prayer. He was educated at Bradford Grammar School and Christ's College, Cambridge.

Sharp was ordained deacon and priest on 12 August 1667 at St. Mary's, Westminster, by special faculty from the Archbishop of Canterbury, Gilbert Sheldon. He was until 1676 the chaplain and tutor to the family of Heneage Finch, 1st Earl of Nottingham at Kensington House. Sharp was incorporated at Oxford on 12 July 1669 on the occasion of the opening of the Sheldonian Theatre. Meanwhile, he became archdeacon of Berkshire (1673), prebendary of Norwich and rector of St Giles in the Fields (1675), and in 1681 Dean of Norwich.

In 1685, Sharp drew up for the grand jury of London their address of congratulation on the accession of James II, and on 20 April 1686 he became chaplain in ordinary to the king. However, provoked by the subversion of his parishioners' faith by Roman Catholics, Sharp preached two sermons at St. Giles's on 2 and 9 May, which were held to reflect on the king. Henry Compton, bishop of London, was ordered to suspend him Sharp from his position at St Giles. Compton refused, but in an interview at Doctors' Commons on the 18th instant privately advised Sharp to ‘forbear the pulpit’ for the present. On 1 July, by the advice of Judge Jeffreys, he left London for Norwich; but when he returned to London in December, his petition, revised by Jeffreys, was received, and in January 1687 he was reinstated.

In August 1688, Sharp was again in trouble. After refusing to read the declaration of indulgence, he was summoned before the ecclesiastical commission of James II. He argued that though obedience was due to the king in preference to the archbishop, yet that obedience went no further than what was legal and honest. After the Glorious Revolution he visited the imprisoned 'Bloody' Jeffreys in the Tower of London and attempted to bring him to penitence and consolation for his crimes.

Soon after the Revolution Sharp preached before the Prince of Orange (soon to be King William III) and three days later before the Convention Parliament. On each occasion, he included prayers for King James on the ground that the lords had not yet concurred in the abdication of James II. On 7 September 1689 he was named dean of Canterbury succeeding John Tillotson.

The same year he was appointed a commissioner for the reform of the liturgy and the ecclesiastical courts. Sharp was seen by some as the 'lowest' of the High Church party and therefore the most fitting candidate to appease the concerns of the Dissenters. The historian Lord Macaulay later described him as ‘the highest churchman that had been zealous for comprehension and the lowest that felt a scruple about succeeding a deprived prelate'. The mooted Comprehension Bill was intended to admit within the pale of the Church a large number of the Nonconformists was, eventually, allowed to drop.

Under William III and Mary II he succeeded Tillotson as Dean of Canterbury in 1689, and (after declining a choice of sees vacated by non-jurors who were his personal friends) followed Thomas Lamplugh as Archbishop of York in 1691. He made a thorough investigation of the affairs of his see, and regulated the disordered chapter of Southwell.

He was whole-hearted in his renunciation of loyalty to James II, and a sceptic about the Divine Right of Kings. In 1701 his friend Lord Nottingham admitted to having the gravest doubts about swearing the Oath of Abjuration. Sharp replied cheerfully that in his view "Princes hold their Crowns by the same legal right as your Lordship holds his estates, and that they may forfeit their rights as well as you".

== Advisor to Queen Anne ==
He preached at the coronation of Queen Anne and became her Lord High Almoner and confidential adviser in matters of church and state, completely eclipsing Thomas Tenison, the Archbishop of Canterbury, whose low church views made him uncongenial to the Queen. Anne, as he records, said: "that I would be her confessor, and she would be mine". His diary makes it clear that she often confided State business to him, and listened carefully to any arguments he made, even if she did not always follow his advice. His diary is a useful source for her reign, and contradicts the Memoirs of Sarah Churchill on a number of crucial points. Unlike Sarah, he maintains that the Queen was devastated by her husband's death ("we both wept"), and that her increasingly close friendship with Abigail Masham was not a secret ("talked with the Queen of Mrs. Masham, I find she has a true kindness for her").

Sarah Churchill, who prided herself on never dissembling her opinions, and eventually lost the Queen's friendship as a result, said that Sharp quickly came to know and comply with the Queen's wishes on all subjects. However, the Queen never appointed a bishop without consulting Sharp and always tried to obtain his consent to her choice. By contrast, when Archbishop Tenison, who was out of favour, protested that he had not been consulted about the appointment of Sir Jonathan Trelawny, 3rd Baronet as the new Bishop of Winchester in 1707, the Queen cut him short with the cold remark that "the matter was decided", and she continued to ignore Tenison's wishes on episcopal appointments. The Queen relied on Sharp to support her policies in the House of Lords, although she made it clear that he could vote against her wishes if his conscience so demanded it; he was also expected to act as one of her Parliamentary "managers", lobbying not only the bishops but also those Yorkshire MPs who were known to him personally. It is a sign of her special trust in Sharp that she confided to him her plans, which proved to be unsuccessful, to change the Ministry in late 1707.

He was a Commissioner for the Union with Scotland in 1705–7, as was his fellow Archbishop, Tenison. He welcomed the Armenian bishops who came to England in 1713, and corresponded with the Prussian court on the possibility of the Anglican liturgy as a means of reconciliation between Lutherans and Calvinists. On the much-debated question of whether the Queen favoured the Old Pretender or the House of Hanover, Sharp, although he died before the matter became critical, was certain that she favoured the Hanoverian succession.

He died at Bath on 2 February 1714. At his request, the Queen promoted William Dawes to fill the vacant see. Sharp is buried in York Minister with a monument sculpted by Francis Bird.

== Works ==
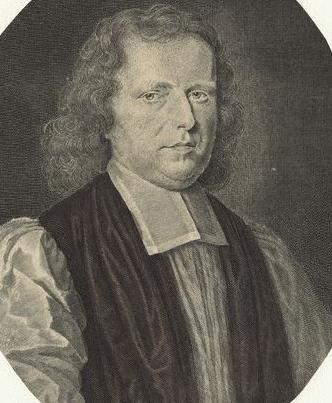
Archbishop Sharp, 1691 engraving by Robert White.

His works (chiefly sermons) were published in 7 volumes in 1754, and in 5 volumes at Oxford in 1829.

== Family ==
Sharp was married, by John Tillotson, at Clerkenwell in 1676 to Elizabeth Palmer of Winthorpe, Lincolnshire. Of his fourteen children, only four survived him, including:

- John Sharp (1678–1727), MP for Ripon 1701–1714
- Thomas Sharp (1693–1758), clergyman and writer, Archdeacon of Northumberland
- Dorothy Sharp, married Thomas Mangey, clergyman and scholar

The English surgeon William Sharp and his brother the abolitionist Granville Sharp were sons of Thomas. Sir Joshua Sharp, Sheriff of London in 1713, was the Archbishop's brother.

== Arms ==
Coat of arms of John Sharp

Notes
While serving as a bishop Sharp's arms would be displayed impaled with the arms of the diocese and topped by a mitre.
Escutcheon
Azure a pheon Argent a bordure Or entoyre of torteaux.

Church of England titles
Preceded by Herbert Astley	Dean of Norwich; 1681–1689	Succeeded by Henry Fairfax
Preceded by John Tillotson	Dean of Canterbury; 1689–1691	Succeeded by George Hooper
Preceded by Thomas Lamplugh	Archbishop of York; 1691–1714	Succeeded by Sir William Dawes, Bt.
