= Dawes baronets =

Extinct baronetcy in the Baronetage of England

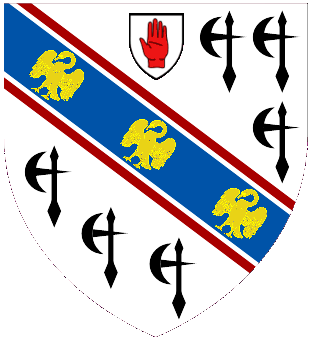
Arms:Argent on a bend Azure cotised Gules between six battle axes Sable three swans Or.

The Dawes Baronetcy, of Putney in the County of Surrey, was a title in the Baronetage of England. It was created on 1 June 1663 for the nineteen-year-old John Dawes. According to the Diary of Samuel Pepys, his marriage to a sixteen-year-old heiress, Christian 'Jane' Hawkins, caused something of a scandal. His third son, William, the third Baronet, was Archbishop of York from 1714 to 1724. The title became extinct on the early death of the latter's grandson, the fifth Baronet, in 1741.

== Dawes baronets, of Putney (1663) ==
- Sir John Dawes, 1st Baronet (1644–1671)
- Sir Robert Dawes, 2nd Baronet (died 1690), son of the 1st Baronet
- Sir William Dawes, 3rd Baronet (1671–1724), brother of the 2nd Baronet
- Sir Darcy Dawes, 4th Baronet (1688-1732), son of the 3rd Baronet
- Sir William Dawes, 5th Baronet (1729–1741)

== See also ==
- Sir Joshua Vanneck, 1st Baronet – In 1751 he was created a Baronet, of Putney in the County of Surrey.
