= John Hutchinson (writer) =

English theologian and natural philosopher (1674–1737)

John Hutchinson (1674 – 28 August 1737) was an English theologian and natural philosopher.

He was born at Spennithorne, Yorkshire, and served as steward in several families of position, latterly in that of the Duke of Somerset, who ultimately obtained for him the post of riding purveyor to the master of the horse, a sinecure worth about £200 a year. In 1700 he became acquainted with Dr. John Woodward (1665–1728), physician to the duke and author of a work entitled The Natural History of the Earth, to whom he entrusted a large number of fossils of his own collecting, along with a mass of manuscript notes, for arrangement and publication.

A misunderstanding as to the manner in which these should be dealt with was the immediate occasion of the publication by Hutchinson in 1724 of Moses's Principia, part i., in which Woodward's Natural History was bitterly ridiculed, his conduct with regard to the mineralogical specimens not obscurely characterized, and a refutation of the Newtonian doctrine of gravitation seriously attempted. It was followed by part ii. in 1727, and by various other works, including Moses's Sine Principio, 1730; The Confusion of Tongues and Trinity of the Gentiles, 1731; Power Essential and Mechanical, or what power belongs to God and what to his creatures, in which the design of Sir Isaac Newton and Dr Samuel Clarke is laid open, 1732; Glory or Gravity, 1733; The Religion of Satan, or Antichrist Delineated, 1736.

He taught that the Bible contained the elements not only of true religion but also of all rational philosophy. He held that the Hebrew must be read without points, and his interpretation rested largely on fanciful symbolism. Bishop George Horne of Norwich was during some of his earlier years an avowed Hutchinsonian; and William Jones of Nayland continued to be so to the end of his life.

A complete edition of his publications, edited by Robert Spearman and Julius Bate, appeared in 1748 (12 vols.); an Abstract of these followed in 1753; and a Supplement, with Life by Spearman prefixed, in 1765.

Another of Hutchinson's numerous works is The Covenant in the Cherubim: So the Hebrew Writings Perfect. Alterations by Rabbies Forged Shewing the Evidence for the Scriptures .
