= Sir William Dawes, 3rd Baronet =

Archbishop of York from 1714 to 1724

The Most Reverend and Right Honourable Sir William Dawes Bt
- Archbishop of York
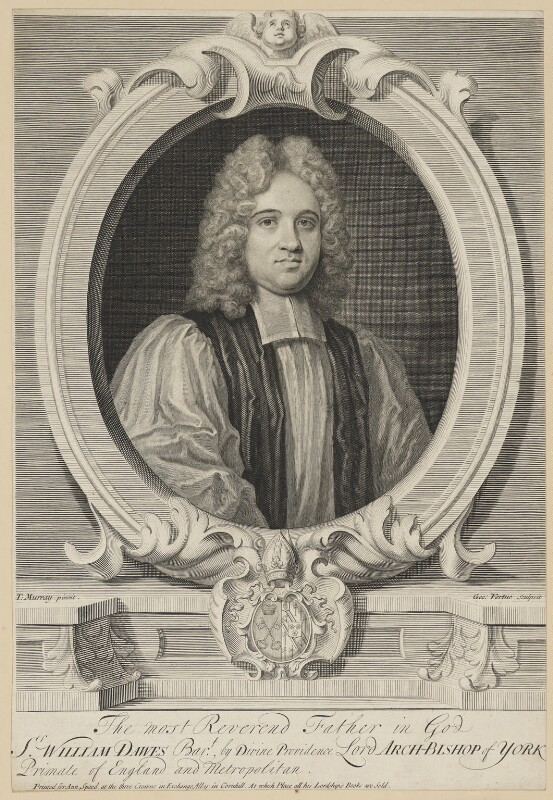
- Province: York
- Diocese: York
- In office: 1714–1724
- Predecessor: John Sharp
- Successor: Lancelot Blackburne
- Other posts: Dean of Bocking (1698–1708); Bishop of Chester (1708–1714)

Orders
- Consecration: 1708

Personal details
- Born: 12 September 1671 Great Leighs, Essex, England
- Died: 30 April 1724 (aged 52) Westminster, Middlesex, England
- Buried: Chapel, St Catharine's Hall, Cambridge
- Denomination: Anglican
- Parents: Sir John Dawes; Christian née Lyons
- Spouse: Frances D'Arcy (m. 1692; died 1705)
- Children: 5 sons & 2 daughters
- Education: St John's College, Oxford; St Catharine's Hall, Cambridge

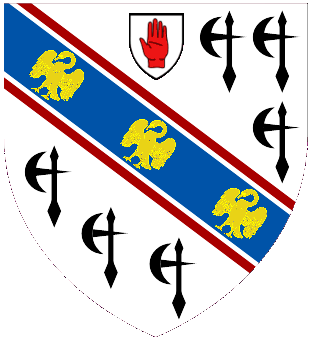
Arms: Argent on a bend Azure cotised Gules between six battle axes Sable three swans Or.

Sir William Dawes, 3rd Baronet (12 September 1671 – 30 April 1724) was an English Anglican prelate who served as Bishop of Chester from 1708 to 1714 and then as Archbishop of York from 1714 to 1724. Politically he was a Hanoverian Tory, who favoured the Hanoverian Succession.

== Education ==
Dawes was born at Lyons, near Braintree in Essex and from the age of nine attended Merchant Taylors' School in London. Already excelling in Hebrew by the age of 15, he was barely 18 when he wrote his work in verse: The Anatomy of Atheisme, and his eminent The Duties of the Closet in prose.

In 1687, William matriculated at St John's College, Oxford, of which college he also became a fellow, then migrated to St Catharine's Hall, Cambridge in 1689. He graduated Master of Arts (MA Cantab) from St Catharine's in 1695, on royal decree (per lit. reg.) due to his young age; in 1696 he graduated in theology of Doctor of Divinity (DD).

== Anglican priest ==
William Dawes became the permanent pastor of William III (1688–1702) and was later court pastor of Queen Anne (1702–14). From 1698, at a young age, he was Canon of Worcester Cathedral.

He was Master of St Catharine's Hall, Cambridge between 1697 and 1714 and Vice-Chancellor of Cambridge, 1698–9.

In 1698 he was appointed rector in the village of Bocking (where the rector is called Dean of Bocking) near to his estates in Essex. Here he introduced the innovative custom of taking Holy Communion not only on the three great feasts, but once every month.

On 8 February 1708 he was consecrated Bishop of Chester: this was at the personal wish of Queen Anne, who overruled the advice of her ministers in appointing him. He was Archbishop of York from 1714 until his death in 1724 and a Privy Counsellor. He owed his advancement to the goodwill of the Queen and of his predecessor, John Sharp, who had great regard for him, and had great influence with the Queen: it was Sharp's dying request that Dawes succeed him at York, which the Queen happily granted. He restored the Archbishop's palace in York, the Bishopthorpe.

He died on 30 April 1724 from inflammation of the bowels. He was buried in the chapel of St Catharine's together with his wife. He was the most outstanding preacher of his period, a representative of the ideal of an aristocratic prelate, of a high and authoritative personality.

== Family ==
William Dawes was the son of John Dawes, 1st Baronet of Putney and Jane (Christian) Hawkins the Daughter of Richard Hawkins of Bocking near Braintree Essex. According to Samuel Pepys, his parents' marriage gave rise to a good deal of gossip. His orphaned mother was an heiress, aged only sixteen, and it was claimed that her husband married her without her guardian's consent. After his father's death his mother remarried the noted shipbuilder Sir Anthony Deane, by whom she had eight more children.

William married Frances Cole d'Arcy (1673–1705; daughter of Thomas d'Arcy {1632–1693} and Jane Cole {1640–?}) on 1 December 1692, at St Edmund King and Martyr, Lombard St, City of London.

Their daughter Elizabeth married William Milner (?−1745), 1st Baronet of Nun Appleton Hall, MP for York in the early 18th century.

== Styles and titles ==
- 1690–1695: Sir William Dawes Bt
- 1695–1696: The Reverend Sir William Dawes Bt
- 1696–1698: The Reverend Doctor Sir William Dawes Bt
- 1698: The Reverend Canon Doctor Sir William Dawes Bt
- 1698–1708: The Very Reverend Doctor Sir William Dawes Bt
- 1708–1714: The Right Reverend Doctor Sir William Dawes Bt
- 1714–1724: The Most Reverend and Right Honourable Doctor Sir William Dawes Bt

Church of England titles
Preceded by Nicholas Stratford	Bishop of Chester; 1708–1714	Succeeded by Francis Gastrell
Preceded by John Sharp	Archbishop of York; 1714–1724	Succeeded by Lancelot Blackburne
Academic offices
Preceded by John Eachard	Master of St Catharine's College, Cambridge; 1697–1714	Succeeded by Thomas Sherlock
Baronetage of England
Preceded by Robert Dawes	Baronet (of Putney); 1690–1724	Succeeded by Darcy Dawes
