= George Wheler (travel writer) =

English clergyman and travel writer (1651–1724)

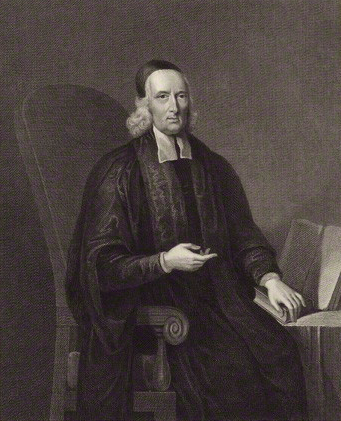
Portrait of Sir George Wheler, engraved by William Bromley

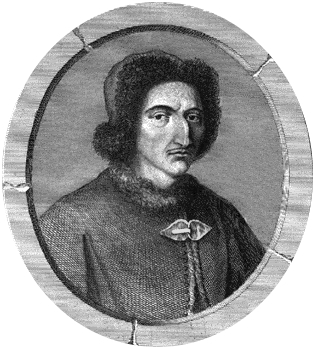
Portrait of Jacob Spon, Wheler's travelling companion in Greece and the Levant.

Sir George Wheler (20 January 1651 [O.S. 10 January] – 15 January 1724 [O.S. 4 January]) was an English clergyman and travel writer.

== Life ==
The son of Charles Wheler of Charing, Kent, colonel in the Life Guards, by his wife Anne, daughter of John Hutchin of Egerton, Kent, he was born on 20 January 1651 New Style date at Breda in the Netherlands, where his Royalist parents were in exile. He was educated at a school in Wye, Kent and Lincoln College, Oxford, matriculating on 31 January 1667. He was created M.A. on 26 March 1683, and D.D. by diploma on 18 May 1702. In 1671 he became a student at the Middle Temple.

In October 1673 he set out for a tour in France, Switzerland, and Italy, and was at first accompanied by George Hickes, his tutor at Lincoln College. While in Italy he received some instruction in antiquities from Jean-Foy Vaillant; and at Venice, in June 1675, met Jacob Spon, with whom he travelled in Greece and the Levant in 1675 and 1676. Spon published a separate account of the journey in 1678 and Wheler's account, A Journey into Greece, was published in 1682. Among the places visited and described by Wheler were Zante, Delos, Constantinople, Prusa ad Olympum, Thyatira, Ephesus, Delphi, Corinth, and Attica. He brought home marbles and inscriptions from Athens, which he donated to the University of Oxford in 1683 and are now kept in the Ashmolean Museum. He made considerable use of coins in his book, and paid attention to botany. He brought home plants that had not been cultivated in Britain, including a Hypericum. The botanists John Ray, Robert Morison, and Leonard Plukenet received rare plants from Wheler.

Wheler returned to England in November 1676. In 1677 he was elected a Fellow of the Royal Society (but expelled in 1685) and was knighted on 1 September 1682.

About 1683 he took holy orders. In 1684 he received a canonry in Durham Cathedral, and from 1685 to 1702 was vicar of Basingstoke, Hampshire. In 1706 he was promoted to the rectory of Winston, and in 1709 to the rectory of Houghton-le-Spring (where he founded and endowed a school for girls) both in County Durham.

He died at Durham, after a short illness, on 15 January 1724 New Style date, and was buried in the galilee of Durham Cathedral.

== Works ==
Wheler published:

- A Journey into Greece, London, 1682, with illustrations; French translation, Amsterdam, 1689.
- Account of Churches and Places of Assembly of the Primitive Christians, 1689.
- The Protestant Monastery; or Christian Œconomicks, containing Directions for the Religious Conduct of a Family [London], 1698.

== Legacy ==
Wheler bequeathed his Greek and Latin manuscripts to Lincoln College, and his dried plants, arranged in four volumes, to the University of Oxford, to which in 1683 he had presented marbles and antiquities brought from Greece. He left his coins (English, Greek, and Roman) to the Dean and chapter of Durham. By his will he secured a provision for the minister officiating at the chapel in Spital Fields, built in 1693, chiefly at his own expense. This building, formerly known as Wheler Chapel, was modernised in 1842, as St. Mary's, Spital Square. Wheler had considerable property in Spital Fields and Westminster, and estates in Hampshire and Kent. In 1692 he purchased the ancient archiepiscopal palace at Charing, Kent.

== Family ==
Wheler married Grace, daughter of Sir Thomas Higgons of Grewel, near Odiham, Hampshire, and they had eighteen children. Their daughter Judith Wheler married Thomas Sharp and was mother to the abolitionist Granville Sharp. Granville Wheler was the third son.
