= Granville Sharp =

English scholar, philanthropist and abolitionist (1735–1813)

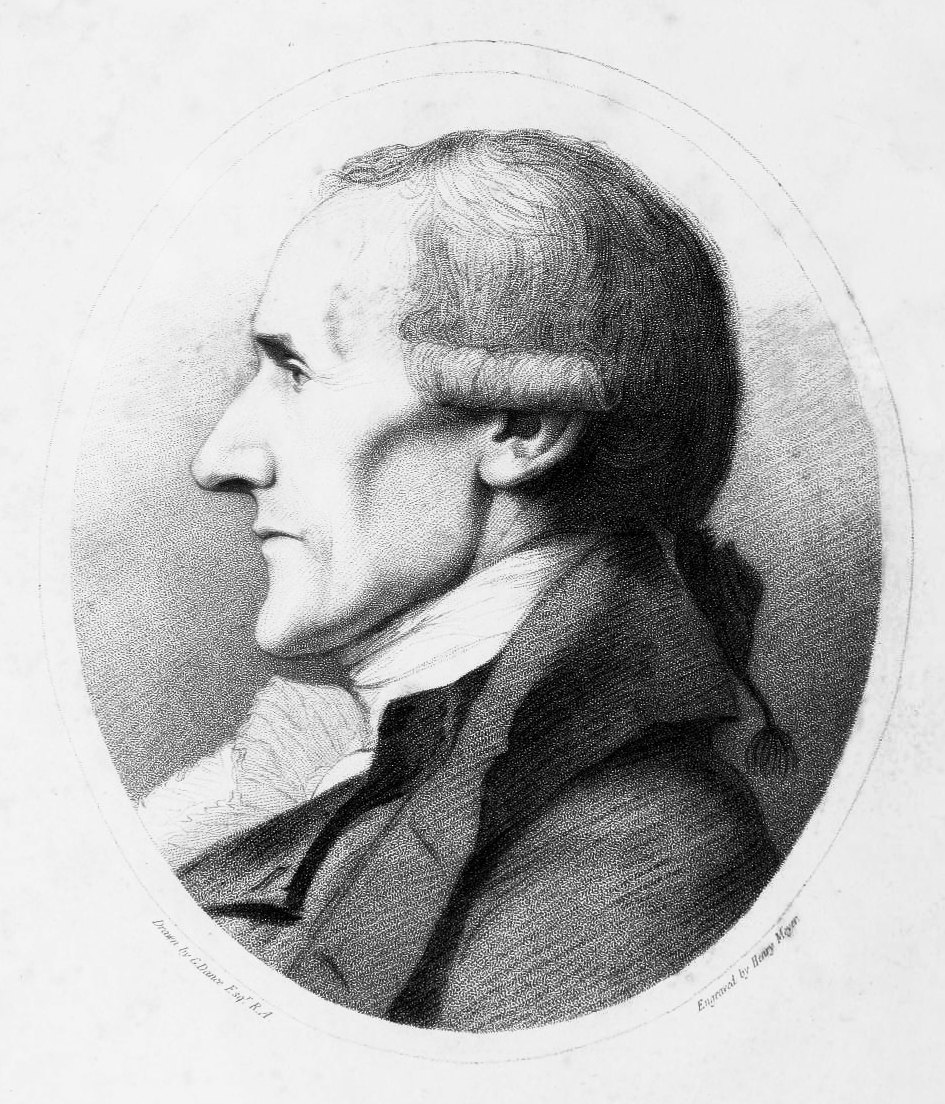
Granville Sharp

Granville Sharp (10 November 1735 – 6 July 1813) was an English scholar, philanthropist and one of the first campaigners for the abolition of the slave trade in Britain. Born in Durham, he initially worked as a civil servant in the Board of Ordnance. His involvement in abolitionism began in 1767 when he defended a severely injured enslaved person from Barbados in a legal case against his master. Increasingly devoted to the cause, he continually sought test cases against the legal justifications for slavery, and in 1769 he published the first tract in England that explicitly attacked the concept of slavery.

Granville Sharp's efforts culminated in 1772 when he was instrumental in securing Lord Mansfield's ruling in Somerset v Stewart, which held that slavery had no basis in English law. In 1787, Sharp and Thomas Clarkson founded the Society for Effecting the Abolition of the Slave Trade. The continuing campaigns of Sharp, Clarkson and William Wilberforce led to the abolition of slave trade through the Slave Trade Act 1807. Sharp died in 1813, two decades before the Slavery Abolition Act 1833, which abolished slavery in most of the British Empire.

In addition to his abolitionist cause, Sharp also championed the creation of a free colony in Sierra Leone, which encouraged black people in Britain to settle in west Africa. His efforts led to the founding of the Province of Freedom and later Freetown. He was also an advocate for the American colonists, parliamentary reform and the legislative independence of Ireland. An accomplished classicist and biblical scholar, Sharp was also one of the founders of the British and Foreign Bible Society.

== Life ==
Granville Sharp was the son of Judith Wheler (d. 1757) and Thomas Sharp (1693–1759), Archdeacon of Northumberland, prolific theological writer and biographer of his father, John Sharp, Archbishop of York. Judith was the daughter of travel writer George Wheler and Grace née Higgons, who grew up in the political household of Sir Thomas Higgons.

Sharp was born in Durham in 1735. He had eight older brothers and five younger sisters. Five of his brothers survived their infancy and by the time Sharp had reached his midteens the family funds set aside for their education had been all but depleted, so Sharp was educated at Durham School but mainly at home.

He was apprenticed to a London linen-draper at the age of fifteen. Sharp loved to argue and debate, and his keen intellect found little outlet in the mundane work in which he was involved. However, one of his fellow-apprentices was Socinian (a Unitarian sect that denied the divinity of Christ), and in order better to argue, Sharp taught himself Greek. Another fellow apprentice was Jewish, and so Sharp learned Hebrew in order to be able to discuss theological matters with his colleague. Sharp also conducted genealogical research for one of his masters, Henry Willoughby, who had a claim to the barony of Willoughby de Parham, and it was through Sharp's work that Willoughby was able to take his place in the House of Lords.

Sharp's apprenticeship ended in 1757, and both his parents died soon after. That same year he accepted a position as Clerk in the Ordnance Office at the Tower of London. This civil service position allowed him plenty of free time to pursue his scholarly and intellectual pursuits.

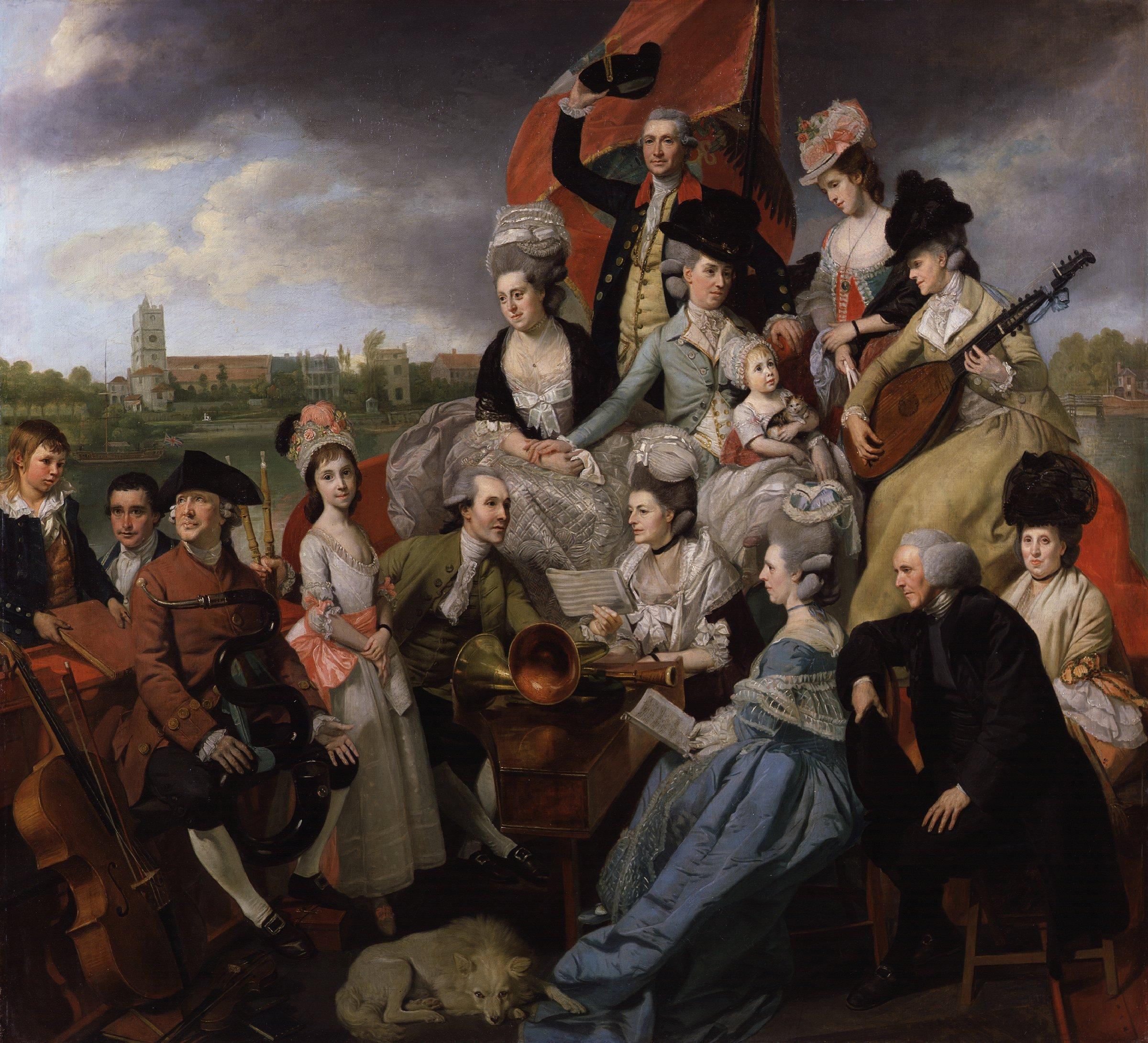
The Sharp Family, by Johann Zoffany, 1779–81, National Portrait Gallery, London. The family musical ensemble are pictured on their barge, Apollo, with All Saints', Fulham in the background. Granville Sharp is the seated male figure in the centre.

Sharp had a keen musical interest. Four of his siblings – William, later to become surgeon to George III, James, Elizabeth and Judith – had also come to London, and they met every day. They all played musical instruments as a family orchestra, giving concerts at William's house in Mincing Lane and later in the family sailing barge, Apollo, which was moored at the Bishop of London's steps in Fulham, near William's country home, Fulham House. The fortnightly water-borne concerts took place from 1775–1783, the year his brother James died. Sharp had an excellent bass voice, described by George III as "the best in Britain", and he played the clarinet, oboe, flageolet, kettle drums, harp and a double-flute which he had made himself. He often signed his name in notes to friends as G♯.

Sharp died at Fulham House on 6 July 1813, and a memorial of him was erected in Westminster Abbey. He lived in Fulham, London, and was buried in the churchyard of All Saints', Fulham. The vicar would not allow a funeral sermon to be preached in the church because Sharp had been involved with the British and Foreign Bible Society, which was Nonconformist.

== Abolitionism ==
Sharp is best known for his untiring efforts for the abolition of slavery, although he was involved in many other causes, fired by a dislike of any social or legal injustice.

=== Sharp's first involvement: Jonathan Strong ===
Sharp's brother William held a regular surgery for the local poor at his surgery at Mincing Lane, and one day in 1765 when Sharp was visiting, he met Jonathan Strong. Strong was a young black slave from Barbados who had been badly beaten by his master, David Lisle, a lawyer, with a pistol to the head. This left him close to blindness and as a result he had been cast out into the street as useless. Sharp and his brother tended to his injuries and had him admitted to Barts Hospital, where his injuries were so bad they necessitated a four-month stay. The Sharps paid for his treatment and, when he was fit enough, found him employment as an errand runner with a Quaker apothecary friend of theirs.

In 1767, Lisle saw Strong in the street and planned to sell him to a Jamaica planter named James Kerr for £30. Two slave catchers captured Strong with the intention to ship him to the Caribbean where he would work on Kerr's plantation. Strong was able to get word to Sharp, who went directly to the Lord Mayor who in turn convened those laying claim to Strong. In court, Macbean, Kerr's attorney, produced the bill of sales from when Lisle sold Strong to Kerr. That was not enough to convince the Lord Mayor because Strong was imprisoned without clear cause, and so he liberated Strong. Afterwards, a West India Captain named David Laird grabbed Jonathan Strong's arm and claimed he would take him as James Kerr's property. Sharp, at the suggestion of Thomas Beech, the Coroner of London, threatened to charge Laird with assault should he attempt to take Strong by force. Laird let go of Strong and everyone who had been summoned departed without further dispute.

Afterwards, David Laird instituted a court action against Sharp claiming £200 damages for taking their property, and Lisle challenged Sharp to a duel—Sharp told Lisle that he could expect satisfaction from the law. Sharp consulted lawyers and found that as the law stood it favoured the master's rights to his slaves as property: that a slave remained in law the chattel of his master even on English soil. Sharp said "he could not believe the law of England was really so injurious to natural rights." He spent the next two years in study of English law, especially where it applied to the liberty of the individual.

Lisle disappeared from the records early, but Kerr persisted with his suit through eight legal terms before it was dismissed, and Kerr was ordered to pay substantial damages for wasting the court's time. Jonathan Strong was free, even if the law had not been changed, but he only lived for five years as a free man, dying at 25.

=== Increasing involvement ===
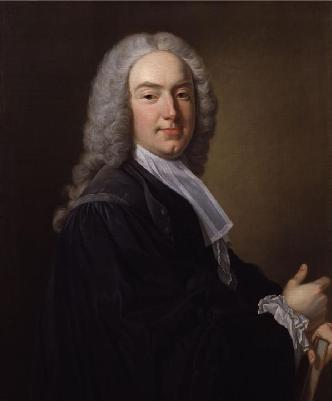
Portrait of William Murray by Jean-Baptiste van Loo, 1737. William Murray, 1st Earl of Mansfield

The Strong case made a name for Sharp as the "protector of the Negro" and he was approached by two more slaves, although in both cases (Hylas v Newton and R v Stapylton) the results were unsatisfactory, and it became plain that the judiciary – and Lord Mansfield, the Chief Justice of the King's Bench (the leading judge of the day) in particular – was trying very hard not to decide the issue. By this time, Great Britain controlled the largest share in the transatlantic slave trade, and the triangular trade based on slavery was important to the British economy.

In 1769 Sharp published A Representation of the Injustice and Dangerous Tendency of Tolerating Slavery ..., the first tract in England attacking slavery. Within it, he argues that "the laws of nature" grant equality to all humans regardless of any artificial laws imposed by society. He also condemns slave contracts because the liberty of a man cannot be matched in value by anything. Sharp's work attracted the attention of James Oglethorpe, who had long been concerned with slavery as a moral issue. The two men remained close until Oglethorpe's death in 1785.

=== Somerset v Stewart ===
(Also called Somersett's case.) On 13 January 1772, Sharp was visited and asked for help by James Somerset, an indigenous person of Africa who had been brought to America to be sold in the Colony of Virginia. He was then taken to England with his master Charles Stewart in 1769, where he was able to run away in October 1771. After evading slave hunters employed by Stewart for 56 days, Somerset had been caught and put in the slave ship Ann and Mary, to be taken to Jamaica and sold. This was the perfect case for Sharp because, unlike the previous cases, this was a question of lawful slavery rather than of ownership. Three Londoners had applied to Lord Mansfield for a writ of habeas corpus, which had been granted, with Somerset having to appear at a hearing on 24 January 1772. Members of the public responded to Somerset's plight by sending money to pay for his lawyers (who in the event all gave their services pro bono publico), while Stewart's costs were met by the West Indian planters and merchants.

Having studied English law for several years by this point, Sharp called on his now-formidable knowledge of the law regarding individual liberty and briefed Somerset's lawyers. Mansfield's deliberate procrastination stretched Somerset's Case over six hearings from January to May, and he finally delivered his judgment on 22 June 1772. It was a clear victory for Somerset, Sharp and the lawyers who acted for Somerset. Mansfield acknowledged that English law did not allow slavery, and only a new Act of Parliament ("positive law") could bring it into legality. However, the verdict in the case is often misunderstood to mean the end of slavery in England. It was no such thing: it dealt only with the question of the forcible sending of someone overseas into bondage; a slave becomes free the moment they set foot on English territory. It was one of the most significant achievements in the campaign to abolish slavery throughout the world, more for its effect than for its actual legal weight.

=== The Zong massacre ===
In 1781 the crew of the over-capacity slaver ship Zong massacred an estimated 132 slaves by tossing them overboard; an additional ten slaves threw themselves overboard in defiance or despair and over sixty people had perished through neglect, injuries, disease and overcrowding.

The Zong's crew had mis-navigated her course and overestimated water supplies; according to the maritime law notion of general average, cargo purposely jettisoned at sea to save the remainder was eligible for insurance compensation. It was reasoned that as the slaves were cargo, the ship's owners would be entitled to the £30 a head compensation for their loss if thrown overboard: were the slaves to die on land or at sea of so-called "natural" causes, no compensation would be forthcoming.

The ship's owners, a syndicate of merchants based in Liverpool, filed their insurance claim; the insurers disputed it. In this first case the court found for the owners. The insurers appealed.

Sharp was visited on 19 March 1783 by Olaudah Equiano, a famous freed slave and later to be the author of a successful autobiography, who told him of the horrific events aboard the Zong. Sharp immediately became involved in the court case, facing his old adversary over slave trade matters, the Solicitor General for England and Wales, John Lee. Lee notoriously declared that "the case was the same as if assets had been thrown overboard", and that a master could drown slaves without "a surmise of impropriety".

The judge ruled that the Zong's owners could not claim insurance on the slaves: the lack of sufficient water demonstrated that the cargo had been badly managed. However, no officers or crew were charged or prosecuted for the deliberate killing of the slaves, and Sharp's attempts to mount a prosecution for murder never got off the ground.

=== The Society for Effecting the Abolition of the Slave Trade ===
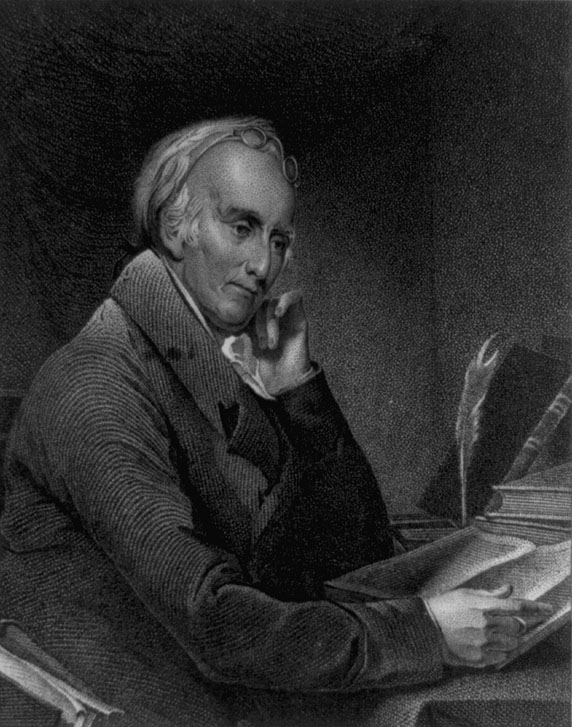
Founding Father Benjamin Rush

Sharp was not completely alone at the beginning of the struggle: the Quakers, especially in America, were committed abolitionists. Sharp had a long and fruitful correspondence with Anthony Benezet, a Quaker abolitionist in Pennsylvania. However, the Quakers were a marginal group in England, and were debarred from standing for Parliament, and they had no doubt as to who should be the chairman of the new society they were founding, The Society for Effecting the Abolition of the Slave Trade. On 22 May 1787, at the inaugural meeting of the committee – nine Quakers and three Anglicans (who strengthened the committee's likelihood of influencing Parliament) – Sharp's position was unanimously agreed. In the 20 years of the society's existence, during which Sharp was ever-present at committee meetings, such was Sharp's modesty that he would never take the chair, always contriving to arrive just after the meeting had started to avoid any chance of having to take the meeting. While the committee felt it sensible to concentrate on the slave trade, Sharp felt strongly that the target should be slavery itself. On this he was out-voted, but he worked tirelessly for the Society nevertheless.

=== Correspondence with Benjamin Rush ===
The correspondence between Granville Sharp and Anthony Benezet inspired Benjamin Rush, a physician in Philadelphia who would later become one of the founding fathers, to contact Sharp as well. This led to a connection by letter between the two that lasted 36 years. In the first letter, written on 1 May 1773, Rush attests to the increasing compassion within the colonies towards the suffering of the slaves. He makes mention of the clergy publicly arguing that slavery is a violation of both "the laws of nature" and Christian belief. This detail is noteworthy because Sharp was of the belief that laws should follow both "the laws of nature" and that which is given in Judeo-Christian scripture. Another letter, written on 21 February 1774, has Sharp providing Rush with several pamphlets, written by himself and his brothers William and James, to be shared with friends and eventually to Lord Dartmouth. Many similar exchanges of pamphlets occur throughout their correspondence, which allowed them to inspire one another and refine their arguments against slavery. The final letter of their correspondence was written on 20 June 1809, four years prior to the death of both figures in 1813.

=== Abolition ===
When Sharp heard that the Act of Abolition had at last been passed by both Houses of Parliament and given Royal Assent on 25 March 1807, he fell to his knees and offered a prayer of thanksgiving. He was now 71, and had outlived almost all of the allies and opponents of his early campaigns. He was regarded as the grand old man of the abolition struggle, and although a driving force in its early days, his place had later been taken by others such as Thomas Clarkson, William Wilberforce and the Clapham Sect. Sharp, however, did not see the final abolition as he died on 6 July 1813.

== The Province of Freedom ==
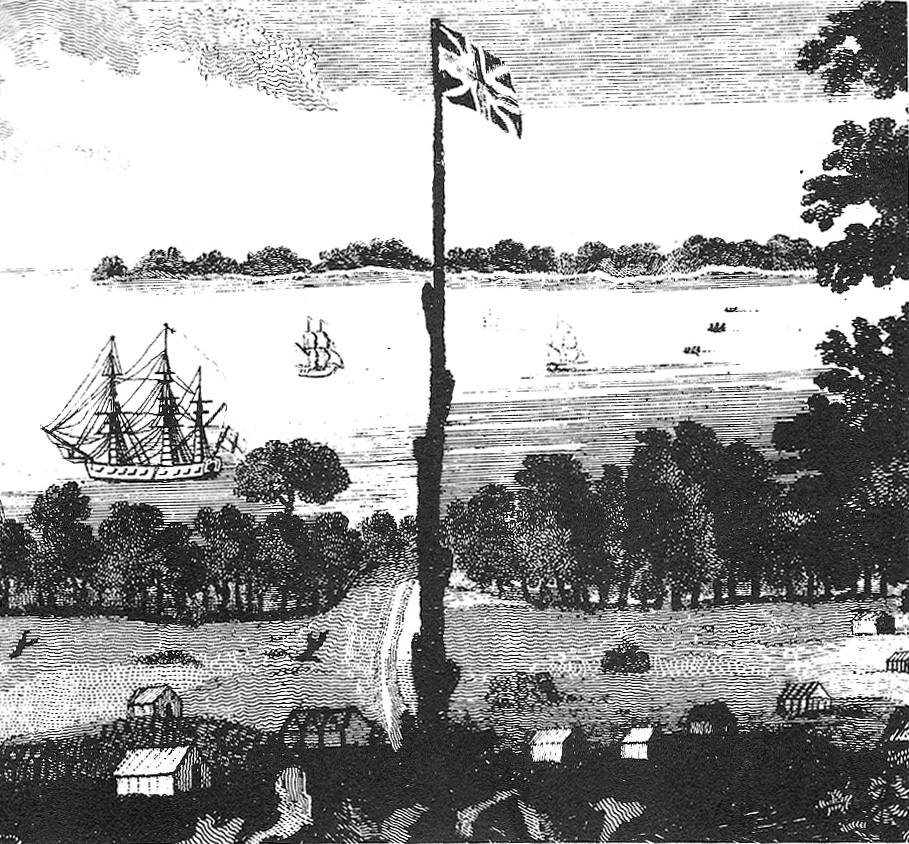
View from Granville Town looking north to Bullom Shore from Voyages to the River Sierra Leone by John Matthews, 1788

Although no reliable figures exist, it is thought that in the early 1780s there were around 15,000 black people in Britain, most of them without employment. Ideas were formulated for a settlement in Africa where they could return "home". Henry Smeathman, a plant collector and entomologist who had visited Sierra Leone, propounded to the Committee for the Relief of the Black Poor that the country would be an excellent location. Worried black people came to see Sharp, concerned that they might be re-enslaved in such a place.

Sharp took to the idea with alacrity: he saw it as a perfect opportunity to create a new model society from scratch. He drew up plans and regulations, and persuaded the Treasury to finance the ships and pay £12 a head to each embarking settler. He named the new, egalitarian, peaceful Christian society-to-be "The Province of Freedom".

The utopian ideal quickly went sour in the face of tremendous logistical difficulties; fire broke out even before the ships had left London. Sharp's friend, Olaudah Equiano, highlighted corruption in the process of stocking the ships, and was dismissed as a result; 411 people sailed for Africa, including some 60 white women without Sharp's knowledge, married to the male settlers. It is unclear how many were previously betrothed and how many married in preparation for the journey; traditionally these women have been characterized as prostitutes from Deptford. However, historians have since dismissed that description as false. The settlers arrived in May 1787, at the onset of the five-month rainy season, and a settlement of sorts was built, named Granville Town. The commander of the naval escort that had brought the settlers concluded that they were unfit for the complex challenge of founding a new settlement in a potentially hostile environment. One of the settlers whom Granville had rescued from a slave ship left the settlement to work in the slave trade, much to Sharp's despair. By the end of 1788 Sharp had poured £1,735 18s 8d of his own money into the settlement. In 1789 Granville Town was burned to the ground by a local Temne chief; this may have been in retaliation for the burning of a Temne by a slave-trader.

Through The Society for Effecting the Abolition of the Slave Trade, in 1790 Granville came into contact with Thomas Peters, a former American slave who fought with the British during revolution in return for freedom. Sharp was instrumental in helping Peters to establish Freetown, Sierra Leone. Sharp is considered to be one of the founders of Sierra Leone alongside Thomas Peters and the Clarkson brothers (Thomas Clarkson and John Clarkson).

== Other activism ==
Sharp ardently sympathized with the revolt of the American colonists. He believed in peace in America, but he also believed they were entitled to "Equitable Representation", an idea repeated in the famous phrase "No taxation without representation". When he realised his job in the Ordnance Office meant sending equipment to British forces fighting the colonists, he took leave of absence. As the war continued, he wrote to his employers "I cannot return to my ordnance duty whilst a bloody war is carried on, unjustly, against my fellow-subjects." Eventually in 1776 he resigned, never to have paid employment again and supported willingly by his brothers, who were happy to see him dedicate his time to his various causes.

Sharp also advocated parliamentary reform and the legislative independence of Ireland, and agitated against the impressment of sailors for the Navy. It was through his efforts that bishops for the United States of America were consecrated by the Archbishop of Canterbury in 1787. He also argued for the reform of Parliament based on Magna Carta and to back this up he devised the doctrine of accumulative authority. This doctrine stated that because almost innumerable parliaments had approved Magna Carta it would take the same number of Parliaments to repeal it. Like many others, Sharp accepted the supremacy of Parliament as an institution, but did not believe that this power was without restraint, and thought that Parliament could not repeal Magna Carta.

Sharp was a co-founders and the first President of the British and Foreign Bible Society and the Society for the Conversion of the Jews.

== Classical grammarian ==
One of Granville's letters written in 1778 (published in 1798), propounded what has come to be known as The Granville Sharp Rule (in actuality only the first of six principles that Sharp articulated involving the Greek article):

"When the copulative kai connects two nouns of the same case, if the article ho, or any of its cases, precedes the first of the said nouns or participles, and is not repeated before the second noun or participle, the latter always relates to the same person that is expressed or described by the first noun or participle ..."

This rule, if true, has a profound bearing on Unitarian doctrine, which led to a ‘celebrated controversy’, in which many leading divines took part, including Christopher Wordsworth.

Sharp's Rule and its application to passages in the New Testament which teach the deity of Christ were the subject of the series "The Greek Article and the Doctrine of Christ's Deity," by Clifford Kuehne, published in the Journal of Theology of the Church of the Lutheran Confession. This series also discusses the application of Colwell's Rule to John 1:1.

Daniel B. Wallace says about Sharp:

"His strong belief in Christ’s deity led him to study the Scriptures in the original in order to defend more ably that precious truth ... As he studied the Scriptures in the original, he noticed a certain pattern, namely, when the construction article-noun-και-noun involved personal nouns which were singular and not proper names, they always referred to the same person. He noticed further that this rule applied in several texts to the deity of Jesus Christ."

But Wallace claims that this rule is often too broadly applied. "Sharp’s rule Number 1" does not always work with plural forms of personal titles. Instead, a phrase that follows the form article-noun-"and"-noun, when the nouns involved are plurals, can involve two entirely distinct groups, two overlapping groups, two groups of which is one a subset of the other, or two identical groups. In other words, the rule is of very specific and limited application.

Of Granville Sharp's most successful critic, Calvin Winstanley, Wallace says:

"Winstanley conceded 'There are, you say, no exceptions, in the New Testament, to your rule; that is, I suppose, unless these particular texts [i.e. the ones Sharp used to adduce Christ's deity] be such ... it is nothing surprising to find all these particular texts in question appearing as the exceptions to your rule, and the sole exceptions ... in the New Testament' – an obvious concession that he could find no exceptions save for the ones he supposed exist in the christologically pregnant texts."

What Wallace neglects by use of ellipses (...) is the flow of Winstanley's argument as well as the character of his theology. Winstanley's quote argued that one could not apply Sharp's rule to the possible exceptions unless it could be shown that extra-biblical literature also followed Sharp's rule. Through multiple examples Winstanley showed that in classical Greek and in patristic Greek – all the literature surrounding the New Testament, the rule simply did not apply consistently. Wallace's quote comes from the end of Winstanley's argument in which he clearly is not conceding the point. To complete Winstanley's argument:

"There are, you say, no exceptions, in the New Testament, to your rule; that is, I suppose, unless these particular texts be such; which you think utterly improbable. You would argue, then, that if these texts were exceptions, there would be more. I do not perceive any great weight in this hypothetical reasoning. But, however plausible it may appear, the reply is at hand. There are no other words so likely to yield exceptions; because there are no other words, between which the insertion of the copulative, would effect so remarkable a deviation from the established form of constructing them to express one person; and of course, would so pointedly suggest a difference of signification."

Winstanley was Trinitarian, but cautioned that a rule that held true only in the New Testament in all but the disputed cases was too flimsy a ground on which to try to prove the divinity of Christ to the Socinians (Unitarians). Instead he said, "[I think] there are much more cogent arguments in reserve, when [Sharp's] rule of interpretation shall be abandoned." His biggest criticisms of Sharp's rule rest in the fact that 1) the early church fathers do not follow it and 2) the early church fathers never invoked this rule to prove the divinity of Christ (though it would have been an obvious tool against such heresy). He concludes, "Hence it may be presumed that the doctrine then rested on other grounds."

However, just because Wallace exaggerates Winstanley's concession does not mean that he has no evidence to refute Winstanley. Wallace argues that, for various reasons, the only two passages from Granville's eight that truly follow Sharp's rule (for textual reasons, among others) are Titus 2:13 and 2 Peter 1:1. Wallace interacts in depth with Winstanley's critiques of Sharp and shows from grammatical, textual, linguistic, and Patristic evidence that Sharp's rule is truly valid across Classical, Biblical, Papyrological, and Patristic Greek – with some slight modification to the rules. Here is how Wallace restates the issue:

"In native Greek constructions (i.e., not translation Greek), when a single article modifies two substantives connected by καί (thus, article-substantive-καί-substantive), when both substantives are (1) singular (both grammatically and semantically), (2) personal, (3) and common nouns (not proper names or ordinals), they have the same referent."

== Legacy ==
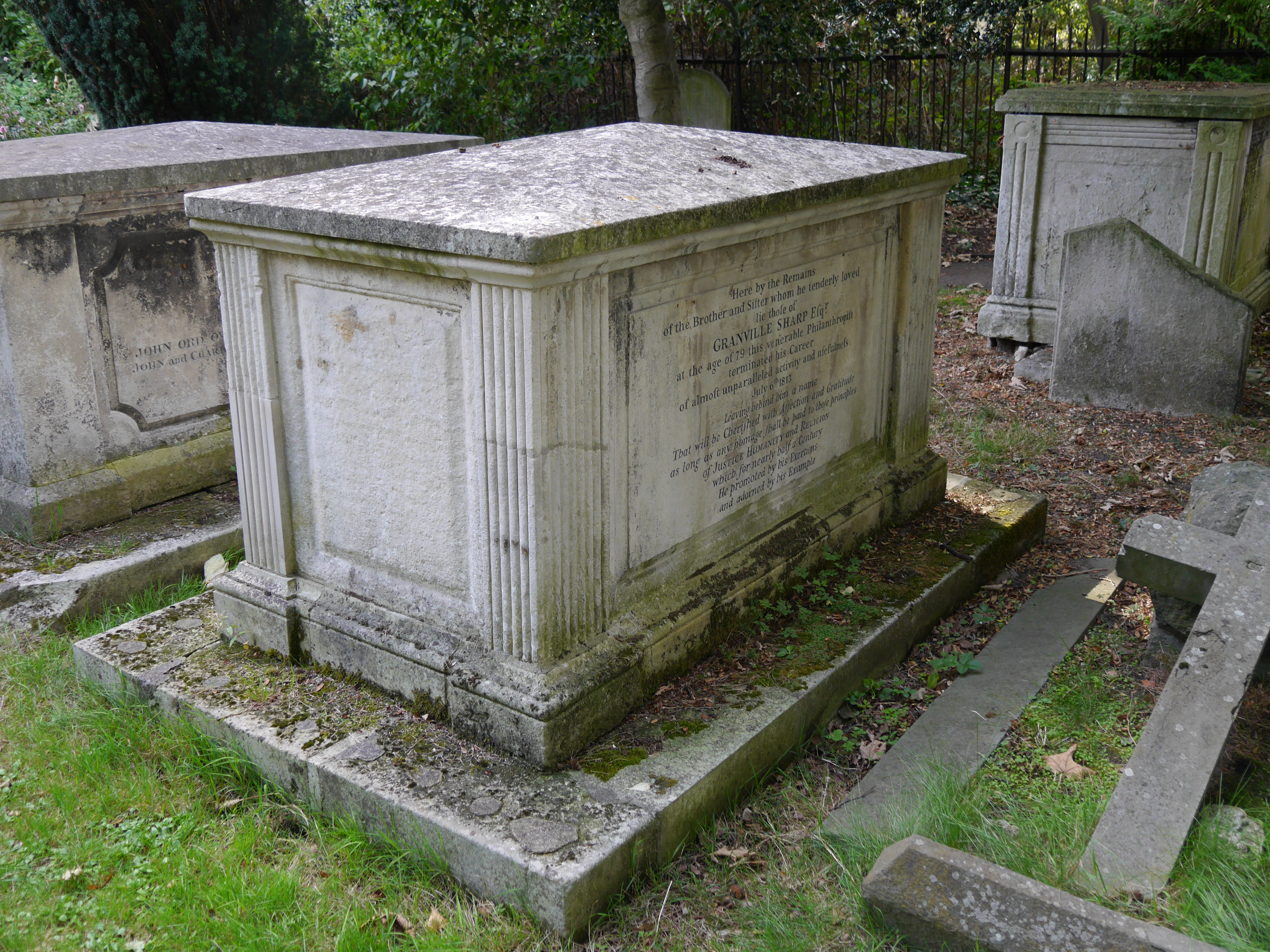
Granville Sharp's tomb at All Saints', Fulham, after restoration

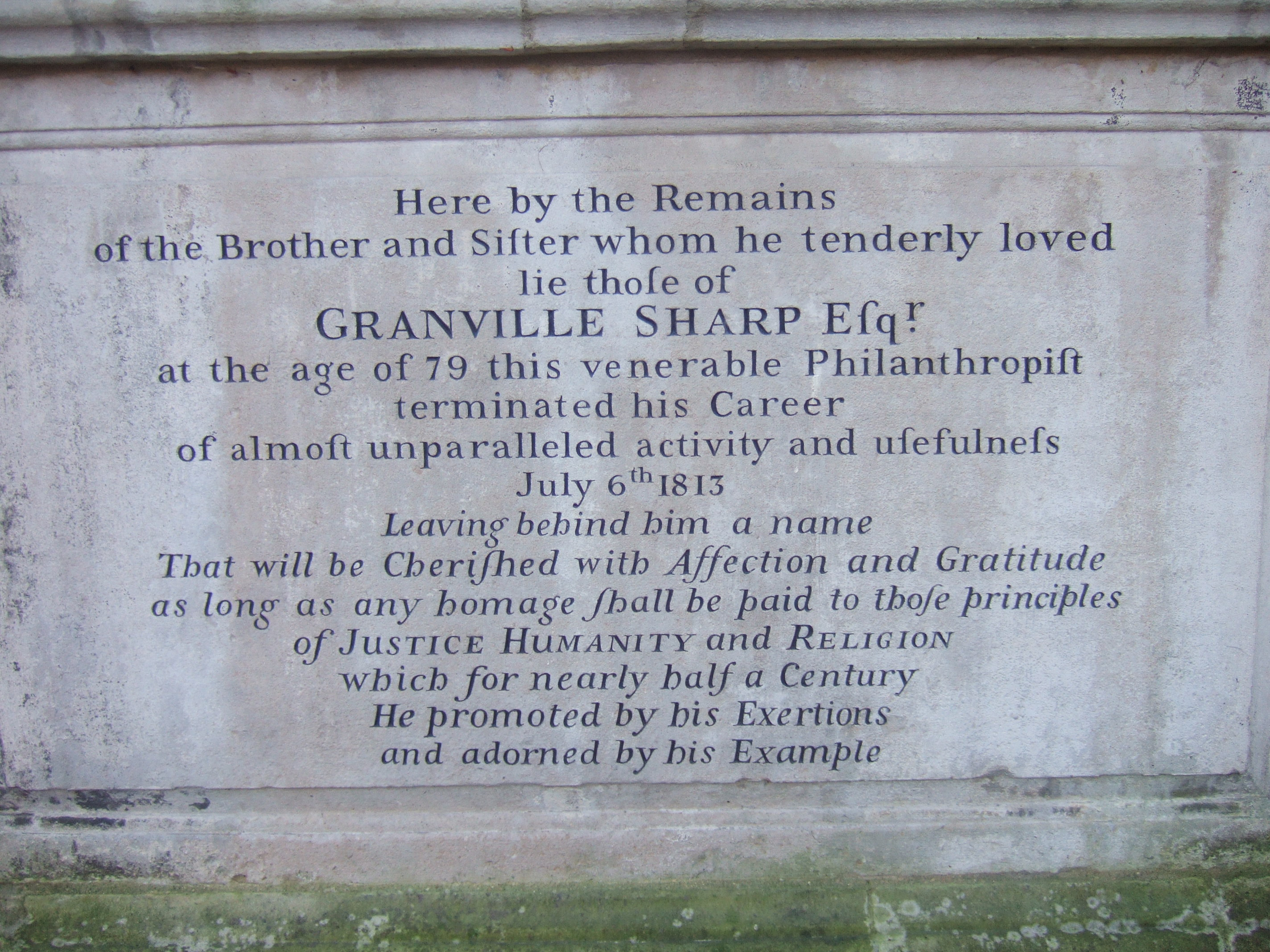
Inscription on Granville Sharp's tomb

After his death on 6 July 1813, Granville Sharp was buried at All Saints' Church, Fulham, beside his brother William Sharp and sister Elizabeth Prouse. The inscription on his tomb states:

"Here by the Remains of the Brother and Sister whom he tenderly loved lie those of GRANVILLE SHARP Esqr. at the age of 79 this venerable Philanthropist terminated his Career of almost unparalleled activity and usefulness July 6th 1813 Leaving behind him a name That will be Cherished with Affection and Gratitude as long as any homage shall be paid to those principles of JUSTICE HUMANITY and RELIGION which for nearly half a Century He promoted by his Exertions and adorned by his Example"

A reredos erected a generation later in All Saints' Church, Fulham, reads: "This reredos was erected in 1845 to the honor of God and in memory of William Sharp of Fulham House, Surgeon to King George III, Catherine his wife, daughter of Thomas Barwick, Granville Sharp, his brother..."

Sharp's portrait was made many times, both during his life and afterwards. The National Portrait Gallery, London holds seven portraits, including the large oil of The Sharp Family by Johann Zoffany and six pencil drawings, etchings and engravings. An oil portrait of Sharp by Mather Brown is in a private collection.

As well as Granville Town in Sierra Leone, the free village of Granville in Jamaica was named after Sharp.

A memorial to Sharp was erected in Westminster Abbey, and he features in carved bas-relief on the side of the Clarkson Memorial, Wisbech, a memorial to fellow-abolitionist Thomas Clarkson (1760–1846).

In 2007, Royal Mail issued a set of stamps marking the 200th anniversary of the abolition of the slave trade in the British Empire. Sharp appeared on the 50p stamp.

In 2007, Sharp's tomb in the graveyard of All Saints', Fulham was also restored to coincide with the anniversary. In recognition of Sharp's historical importance and preparation for the anniversary, the tomb was listed as Grade II on 16 March 2007, only three months after the application was made to English Heritage and the Department of Culture, Media and Sport. The tomb was restored in June 2007 and a ceremony to mark the completion of the work was held in the church, attended by many notable figures including the historian Simon Schama. Speaking at the service, Schama said that "Sharp's great contribution was to 'lower the threshold of shame' in society."

Granville Sharp's papers are deposited at the Gloucestershire Archives, reference D3549. There is also a substantial collection of his letters at York Minster Library. His 'entire library' was sold at auction by Leigh & Sotheby in London on 22 November 1813 (and seven following days) in 1875 lots, although he gave some books to the Bible Society Library during his lifetime (now deposited at Cambridge University Library); a copy of the sale catalogue is held at Cambridge University Library (shelfmark Munby.c.160(7)). His collection of 'music, printed and in manuscript' was sold by Leigh & Sotheby in London on 7 February 1814 (and two following days); a copy is at Cambridge University Library (shelfmark Munby.c.162(5)).

Among the papers at Gloucestershire Archives is a transcription of a work song sung by enslaved Africans in the sugar-cane fields of Barbados. Sharp wrote down the music and lyrics reported by William Dickson, who had heard the song while in Barbados as secretary to the governor. The manuscript, "An African Song or Chant from Barbados", is the oldest notation of a piece of music from the island. In 2017, the manuscript was given UNESCO Memory of the World status, recognising documentary heritage of global importance.

== Works ==
Notable publications are in bold.

- 1765 An Answer to the Rev. Dr. Kennicot's Charge of Corruptions in the Hebrew Texts of Ezra and Nehemiah
- 1767 A Short Introduction to Vocal Musick
- 1767 On the Pronunciation of the English Tongue
- 1768 Remarks on Several Important Prophecies ...
- 1769 **A Representation of the Injustice and Dangerous Tendency of Tolerating Slavery ...**, the first tract in England attacking slavery
- 1771 **An Appendix to the Representation**, reinforcing his case against slavery
- 1771 Remarks Concerning Encroachments on the River Thames
- 1773 Remarks ... against Duelling
- 1774 **A Declaration of the People's Natural Right to a Share in the Legislature**, in support of the American colonists
- 1775 **A Declaration of the People's Natural Right ...**, in support of both Americans and Irish
- 1776 The Law of Retribution
- 1776 **The Just Limitation of Slavery in the Laws of God**
- 1776 The Laws of Passive Obedience
- 1776 The Laws of Liberty
- 1777 preface to General James Oglethorpe's The Sailor's Advocate, an attack on press gangs
- 1777 The Laws of Nature
- 1777 The Case of Saul
- 1778 An Address to the People of England ... stating the Illegality of impressing Seamen
- 1779 The Doctrine of 'Nullum Tempus occurrit Regi' Explained ...
- 1780 seven tracts on **The Legal Means of Political Reformation**
- 1781 seven tracts on Free Militia
- 1784 An Account of the Ancient Division of the English Nation into Hundreds and Tythings
- 1784 Congregational Courts and the ancient English Constitution of Frankpledge
- 1784 A Tract on the Election of Bishops
- 1786 An English Alphabet for the Use of Foreigners
- 1786 **Regulations for a New Settlement of Sierra Leone**
- 1790 **Free English Territory in Africa**
- 1790 Plan of a Public Charity
- 1791 A Letter ... (on) the State of the London Workhouse
- 1792 Causes des Calamités publiques qui régnent à présent par toute l'Étendue de L'Empire Romain
- 1792 A Collection of Political Papers, with Remarks on the Accomplishment of Prophecies
- 1793 **A Letter to a Gentleman in Maryland respecting the extreme Wickedness of tolerating the Slave Trade ...**
- 1794 A General plan for laying out Towns and Townships in new-acquired Lands ...
- 1798 **Remarks on the Uses of the Definitive Article in the Greek Text of the New Testament, Containing Many New Proofs of the Divinity of Christ, from Passages Which Are Wrongly Translated in the Common English Version**, which contains the grammatical principle still known as "Sharp's Rule"
- 1801 The Child's First Book improved, with a Preface addressed to Mothers and Teachers
- 1801 An Answer to an anonymous Letter on Pre-Destination and Free-will, with a Postscript on Eternal Punishments
- 1801 Extract of a Letter on Land-Carriages, Roads, and profitable Labour of Oxen
- 1804 three tracts on The Syntax and Pronunciation of the Hebrew Tongue
- 1805 An Inquiry whether the Description of Babylon ... agrees perfectly with Rome, as a City etc. ...
- 1805 A Letter ... respecting the proposed Catholic Emancipation
- 1805 **Serious Reflections on the Slave Trade and Slavery Addressed to the Peers of Great Britain**
- 1806 A Dissertation on the supreme Divine Dignity of the Messiah
- 1806 Remarks on the two last Petitions in the Lord's Prayer ...
- 1807 The System of Colonial Law compared with the eternal Laws of God, and with the Indispensable Principles of the British Constitution
- 1807 A Letter in Answer to some of the leading Principles and Doctrines of the People called Quakers
- 1807 The Case of Saul, to which is added a short tract wherein the Influence of Demons is further illustrated
- 1808 Jerusalem ... respecting the Etymology of that Word
- 1810 Melchisedec; or an Answer to a Question respecting the Reality of Melchisedec's Existence, as King of Salem and priest of the Most High God
- 1811 Modus Decimandi
- 1812 Remarks on an important Passage, Matt. xxi. 18, which has long been perverted by the Church of Rome in Support of her vain Pretensions to supreme Dominion over all other Episcopal Churches

== See also ==
- List of abolitionist forerunners
- Mary Sharp
