= The Sharp Family =

Painting by Johann Zoffany

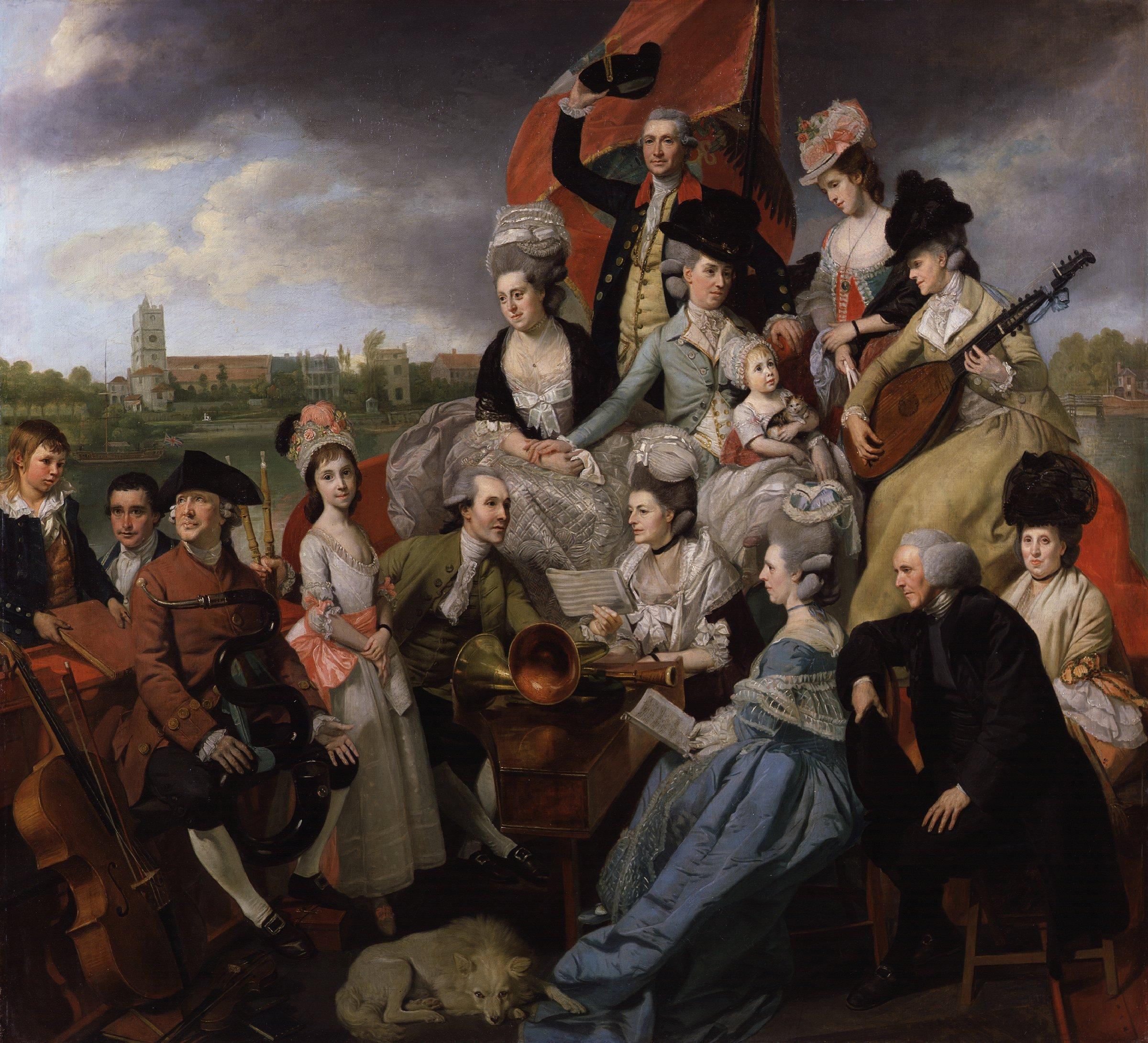
- Artist: Johan Zoffany
- Year: 1779–1781
- Type: Oil on canvas
- Dimensions: 115.6 cm × 125.7 cm (45.5 in × 49.5 in)
- Location: Private collection

The Sharp Family is a group portrait painting by the German-British artist Johan Zoffany. Painted between 1779 and 1781, it portrays the English abolitionist and musician Granville Sharp and his extended family. The Sharp family are depicted on their barge on the River Thames, where they routinely staged concerts. In the background is the church of All Saints, Fulham, to which the family had strong links. It was displayed at the Royal Academy Exhibition of 1781 at Somerset House. As of 2024 the painting is on loan to the National Gallery in London from a private collection.

== Bibliography ==
- Abbott, Mary. Family Ties: English Families 1540–1920. Routledge, 2013.
- Grant, Hester. The Good Sharps: The Brothers and Sisters Who Remade Their World. Random House, 2020.
- Leppert, Richard. Music and Image: Domesticity, Ideology and Socio-cultural Formation in Eighteenth-Century England. Cambridge University Press, 1993.
