= List of masters of St Catharine's College, Cambridge =

This is a list of Masters of St Catharine's College, Cambridge listed by year of appointment.

- 1473 Robert Woodlark (or Wodelarke)
- 1475 Richard Roche
- 1480 John Tapton
- 1487 John Wardall
- 1506 Richard Balderston
- 1507 Thomas Greene
- 1529 Reginald Bainbrigge
- 1547 Edwin Sandys
- 1554 Edmund Cosyn
- 1559 John May
- 1577 Edmund Hownde
- 1598 John Overall
- 1607 John Hills
- 1626 Richard Sibbes
- 1635 Ralph Brownrigg
- 1645 William Spurstowe
- 1650 John Lightfoot
- 1675 John Eachard
- 1697 Sir William Dawes, 3rd Baronet
- 1714 Thomas Sherlock
- 1719 Thomas Crosse
- 1736 Edward Hubbard
- 1741 Kenrick Prescot
- 1779 Lowther Yates
- 1799 Joseph Proctor
- 1845 Henry Philpott
- 1861 Charles Kirkby Robinson
- 1909 Claude Hermann Walter Johns
- 1920 Thomas Wortley Drury
- 1927 Frederick Margetson Rushmore
- 1933 Henry John Chaytor
- 1946 Donald Portway
- 1957 Edwin Ernest Rich
- 1973 Peter Swinnerton-Dyer
- 1984 Barry Supple
- 1993 Terence English
- 2000 David S. Ingram
- 2007 Jean Thomas
- 2016 Mark Welland
- 2023 John Benger
