= Cosin =

Cosin is a surname, which may refer to:

- John Cosin (1594–1672), English churchman
- Richard Cosin (died 1596), English jurist
- Edmund Cosin (or Cosyn; mid 16th century), English Catholic academic and Vice-Chancellor of Cambridge University

== See also ==
- Cosine (disambiguation)
- Cosyn
