= Charles Robinson (priest) =

British clergyman and academic

Charles Kirkby Robinson (1826 – 13 July 1909) was a British clergyman and academic, whose election to the Mastership of St Catharine's College, Cambridge, in 1861 caused great controversy.

Charles Robinson was born in 1826 in Acomb, West Riding of Yorkshire, and educated at St Peter's School, York and matriculated at St Catharine's College, Cambridge, in 1845. He was elected scholar in 1846, and graduated as 22nd Wrangler in 1849. He was appointed Fellow and Tutor in 1850, and was Junior Proctor in the University of Cambridge from 1858 to 1859.

He was ordained as a priest in the Church of England in 1850. He was perpetual curate of St Andrew-the-Less, Cambridge, 1859–62.

The circumstances of his election to Master in 1861 have been outlined by W. H. S. Jones. At the time, there were just five Fellows of the college who were the electorate. Of these, two were candidates - Robinson, and Francis Jameson. In the election, Jameson received two votes, but Robinson received three: his own, Jameson's, and just one other. Since Jameson may have cast his vote under the impression that the candidates were to vote for each other while Robinson did not, this caused something of a stir at the time. Jameson left the Fellowship of St Catharine's shortly after, in 1862.

W. H. S. Jones records that 'this was probably the greatest disaster that ever happened to any college'; whether this was the case or not, the circumstances of the election were not forgotten during Robinson's long tenure as Master, from 1861 to 1909. Robinson was eventually succeeded as Master by Claude Johns.
