= Kenrick Prescot =

English priest and academic (1703–1779)

Kenrick Prescot, D.D. (7 July 1703, Chester – 3 August 1779, Cambridge) was a priest and academic in the second half of the 18th century.

Prescot was educated at Charterhouse and St Catharine's College, Cambridge, graduating BA in 1724, M.A.in 1727 and B.D. in 1738. He was Fellow of St Catharine's from 1727 to 1741 and its Master from 1741 to his death. He was vice-chancellor of the University of Cambridge from 1744 to 1745. Yates was ordained on 24 September 1727. His first post was as curate at Stapleford, Cambridgeshire. He held livings at Hartland, Coton and Yarmouth; and was a prebendary of Norwich Cathedral.
