= Cosyn =

Cosyn is a surname. Notable people with the surname include:

- Edmund Cosyn (or Cosin; mid 16th century), English Catholic academic and Vice-Chancellor of Cambridge University
- William Cosyn (1470s–1525), English dean
- William Cosyn (MP) (fl. 1421–1431), English politician

== See also ==
- Cosin
