= John Tapton =

English priest

John Tapton was Dean of St Asaph from 1463 until 1493.

Tapton was born in Rutland. He was Master of St Catharine's College, Cambridge from 1480 to 1487.

Church of England titles
Preceded by David Blodwell	Dean of St Asaph; 1463–1493	Succeeded by Fouke Salisbury
Preceded by Richard Roche	Master of St Catharine's College, Cambridge; 1480–1487	Succeeded by John Wardall
