= Richard Balderston =

Richard Balderston, or Balderstone, was a priest and academic in the sixteenth century.

Balderston was born in Guisborough. He graduated B.A. from the University of Cambridge in 1488 and M.A. in 1491. He was ordained in 1493 and held livings at Campsall and Coton. He was a Proctor in 1501, by which time he was already a Fellow of St Catharine's. He was Master of St Catharine's from 1506 to his death in 1507.
