= Bull College =

Branch of the Training Within Civilian Agencies programme of the US Army

Coordinates: 52°12′12.8″N 0°7′2″E

- Cambridge University
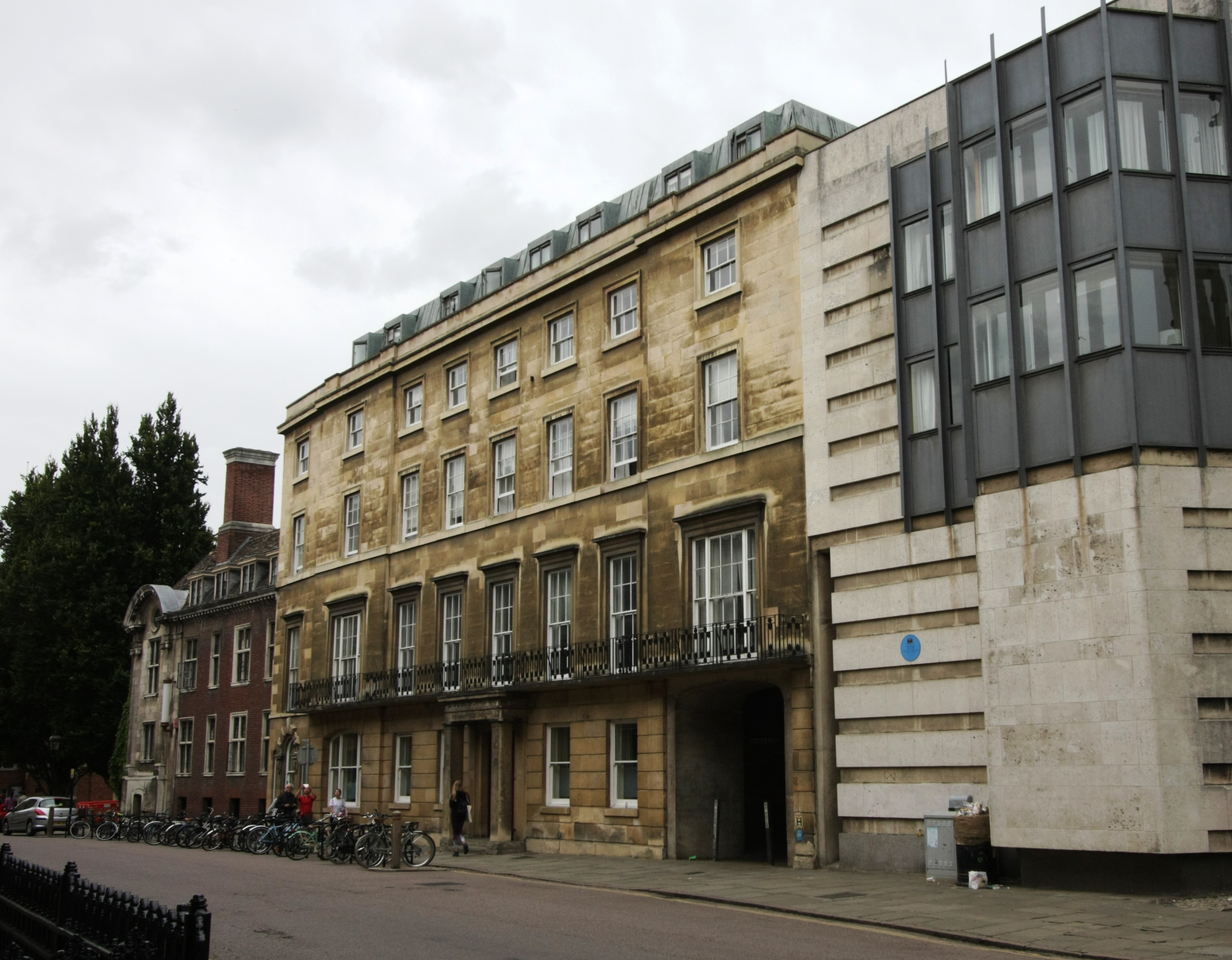
- The Bull Hotel

- Shield of Bull College, designed by Al Kohler
- Full name: Bull College
- Founder: John T. Sheppard
- Established: 4 October 1945 (ceased March 1946)
- Named for: The Bull Hotel
- Master: George D. Blank

Bull College was the name commonly used for a branch of the Training Within Civilian Agencies programme of the US Army, which, during Michaelmas (winter) term 1945 and Lent (spring) term 1946, allowed American military personnel to study at the University of Cambridge at the conclusion of the Second World War. It was named for the Bull Hotel (requisitioned by the British Army from its owner, St Catharine's College and subsequently incorporated into St Catharine's) in which most GIs in the programme were initially billeted. Bull students made an impression on the university, not least through the first participation of a female coxswain in a Cambridge boat race, in the 1946 Lent Bumps. Bull was also involved in a fixture against Pembroke College, in which the first half was played under rugby union rules, and the second under American football rules.

In March 1946 it was announced that the US Army's educational programmes would be cancelled. Plans were made to sustain the college on a longer-term basis using charitable funding, but these came to nothing. Bull students were able to witness the 1946 Oxford–Cambridge Boat Race before being recalled to active service. Bull items, including its shield and copies of its student magazine The Cambridge Bull, were transferred to the St Catharine's archives. The shield combined US and UK flags, the University of Cambridge arms, a bull's head and an American eagle bearing a shield.

David Braybrooke, later a professor at the University of Texas at Austin, was amongst the servicemen who participated in 1945.
