= Tapton =

Tapton may refer to:

== Buildings in England ==
- Tapton House, a late 18th-century country house, now part of Chesterfield College, Tapton, Derbyshire
- Tapton Hall of Residence, one of the halls owned by the University of Sheffield
- Tapton School, of Sheffield
- Tapton Hall, a listed building in the Crosspool area of Sheffield

== Places in England ==
- Tapton, Derbyshire
- Tapton Hill, a district in Broomhill and Sharrow Vale, South Yorkshire

== Other uses ==
- John Tapton, Dean of St Asaph from 1463 until 1493
