= John May (bishop) =

English academic and churchman (died 1598)

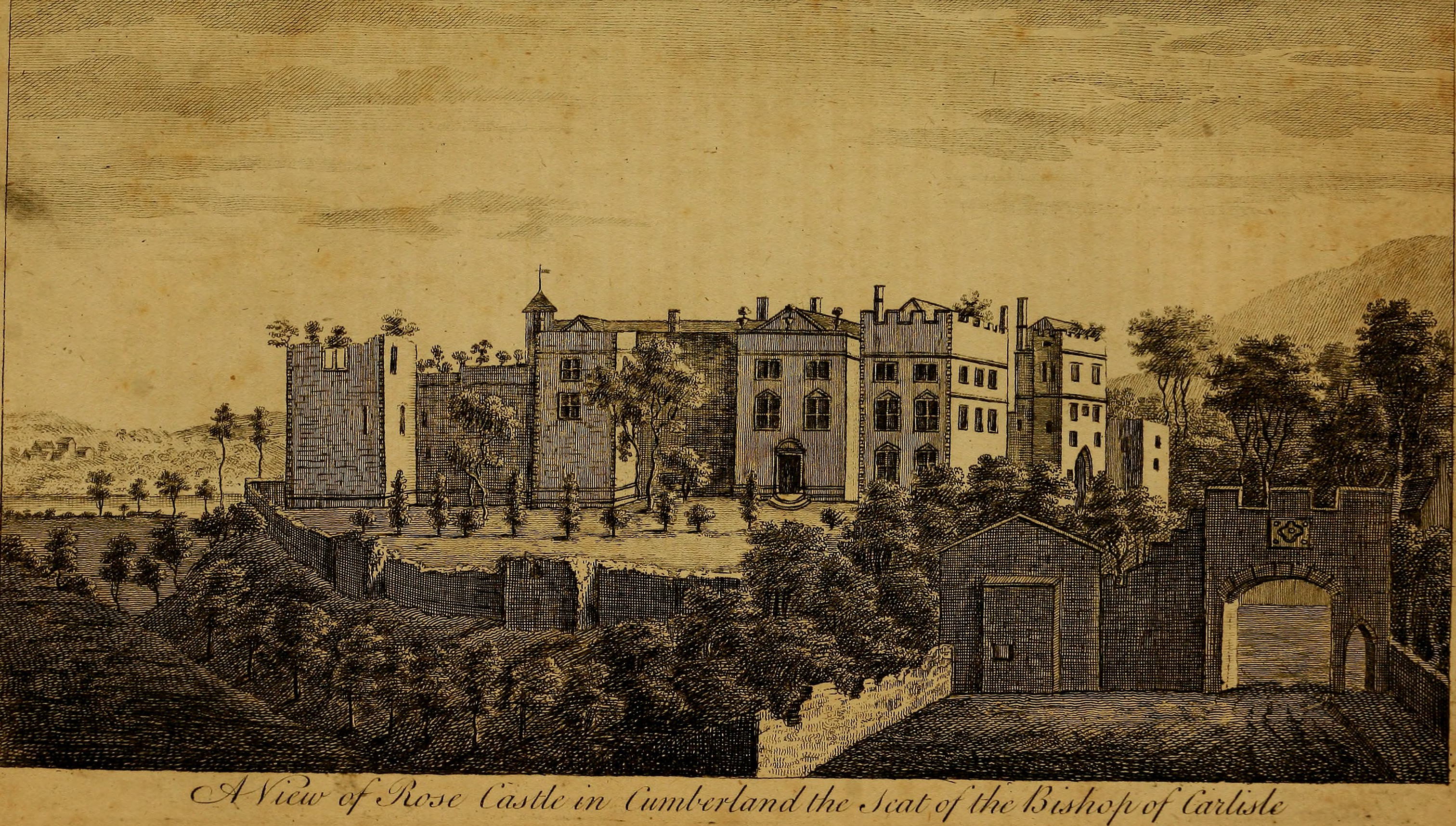
Rose Castle, seat of the Bishop of Carlisle in Cumbria, England

John May (Meye) (died 1598) was an English academic and churchman, who became Bishop of Carlisle. He was also the vice-chancellor of the University of Cambridge and served the House of De Vere in Buckinghamshire.

== Life ==
He was a native of Suffolk and brother of William May. He matriculated as a pensioner of Queens' College, Cambridge, on 2 May 1544. He was appointed bible-clerk of his college, and in 1550 proceeded B.A., being elected fellow in 1550. He commenced M.A. in 1553, and acted as bursar of the college during 1553, 1554, and 1555. Queens' was split in religious sympathies in the Marian period, and May belonged to the Catholic group rather than the reformers.

At midsummer 1557, he was ordained priest, and on 16 November following he was instituted to the rectory of Aston Sandford, Buckinghamshire, owned by Edward de Vere, resigning in 1558. In 1559 he was elected to the mastership of Catharine Hall, Cambridge. In 1560 he commenced B.D., and was collated to the rectory of Long Stanton St. Michael, Cambridgeshire. In 1562 Archbishop Matthew Parker collated him to the rectory of North Creake, Norfolk; and he held also the moiety of the rectory of Darfield, Yorkshire. About 1564 he obtained a canonry of Ely, which he held until May 1582. Also, in 1564 he was created D.D.

In 1565 he was nominated one of the Lent preachers at court. On 26 September in that year he was collated by Archbishop Parker to the rectory of St. Dunstan-in-the East, London, which he vacated in January 1574. He was admitted to the archdeaconry of the East Riding of Yorkshire by proxy on 3 August 1569, in person on 8 October 1571, and retained it until the end of 1588. He served the office of vice-chancellor of the University of Cambridge for the year from November 1569, and was in a commission to visit King's College, Cambridge, in a state of confusion over the conduct of Dr. Philip Baker, the Provost.

Through the influence of George Talbot, 6th Earl of Shrewsbury, May was raised to the see of Carlisle, being consecrated on 29 September 1577. He obtained the Queen's licence to hold his other preferments in commendam, but had long-term financial troubles. From his correspondence with Shrewsbury, he appears to have taken a serious interest in Scottish affairs. On 15 February 1593, the Queen presented William Holland to the rectory of North Creake, which May still held, and there arose a suit in the Queen's bench; it was held that the rectory might be treated as void by reason of May having been subsequently inducted to Darfield.

May died at Rose Castle on 15 February 1598, being about seventy years of age. He was buried at Carlisle, according to the parish register of Dalston, Cumbria, a few hours after his death, which was probably caused by the plague.

== Works ==
May wrote some plays, now lost, which were acted by the members of Queens' College in 1551 and 1553. He was concerned in the compilation of the statutes given to the university by Elizabeth in 1570. Among the Tanner manuscripts in the Bodleian Library are some notes of a sermon which he preached at Paul's Cross in 1565.

== Family ==
His wife was Amy, daughter of William Vowel of Creake Abbey, Norfolk, and widow of John Cowel of Lancashire. By her he had issue: John of Shouldham, Norfolk, who married Cordelia, daughter of Martin Bowes of Norfolk; Elizabeth, wife of Richard Bird, D.D.; Alice, wife of Richard Burton of Burton, Yorkshire; and Anne, wife of Richard Pilkington, D.D., rector of Hambleden, Buckinghamshire.

== Notes ==
Academic offices
Preceded by Edmund Cosyn	Master of St Catharine's College, Cambridge; 1559–1577	Succeeded by Edmund Hownde
Church of England titles
Preceded by Richard Barnes	Bishop of Carlisle; 1577–1598	Succeeded by Henry Robinson
