= Thomas Sherlock =

Bishop of Bangor; Bishop of Salisbury; Bishop of London

The Right Reverend and Right Honourable Thomas Sherlock
- Bishop of London
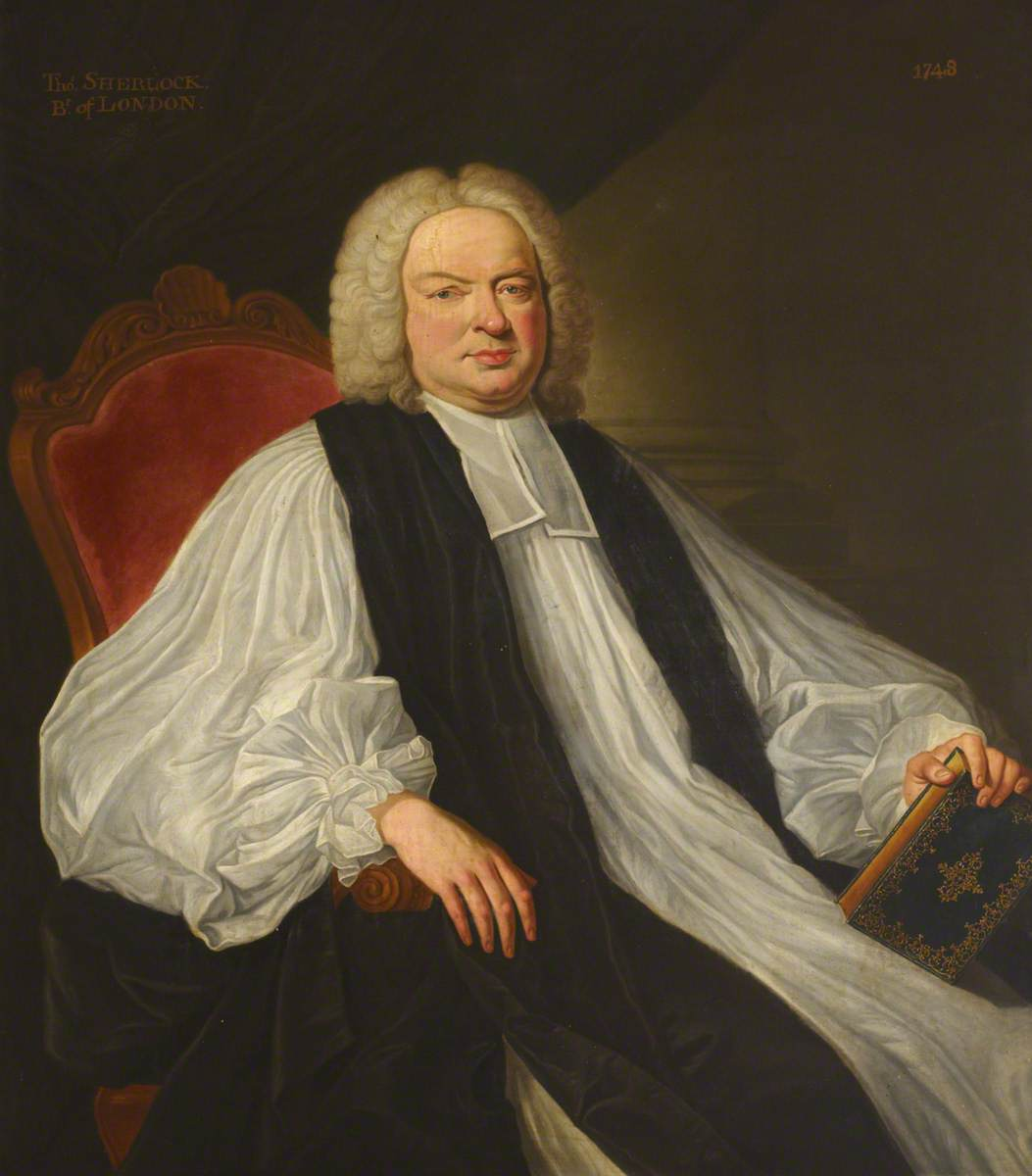
- Portrait by Jean-Baptiste van Loo
- Church: Church of England
- Diocese: London
- Elected: 1748
- Term ended: 1761 (death)
- Predecessor: Edmund Gibson
- Successor: Thomas Hayter
- Other posts: Bishop of Salisbury; 1734–1748; Bishop of Bangor; 1728–1734

Orders
- Consecration: c. 1728

Personal details
- Born: 1678 London
- Died: 18 July 1761
- Buried: All Saints Church, Fulham, Middlesex
- Denomination: Anglican
- Parents: William Sherlock
- Profession: Academic
- Education: St Catharine's College, Cambridge (MA, DD)

Thomas Sherlock (1678 – 18 July 1761) PC was a British divine who served as a Church of England bishop for 33 years. He is also noted in church history as an important contributor to Christian apologetics.

== Life ==
Born in London, he was the son of the Very Reverend William Sherlock, Dean of St Paul's. He was educated at Eton College and St Catharine's College, Cambridge. In 1704 he succeeded his father as Master of the Temple, where he was very popular.

Sherlock died in July 1761, and is buried in the churchyard of All Saints Church, Fulham, Middlesex. Much of his ancestral and earned wealth passed to the Gooch baronets who took Sherlock for many generations thereafter in tribute; his picture hanging in Benacre Hall, their purchased home in the period of his death.

== Career ==
In 1714 he became master of his old college at Cambridge and later the university's vice-chancellor, whose privileges he defended against Richard Bentley. In 1715, he was appointed Dean of Chichester.

He took a prominent part in the Bangorian controversy against Benjamin Hoadly. Sherlock became Bishop of Bangor in 1728. He was translated to Salisbury in 1734 (where he was admitted as ex officio Chancellor of the Order of the Garter on 20 February 1738); and in 1748 he was raised to London, where he was sworn of the Privy Council. He held the see of London until his death.

Sherlock was a capable administrator and cultivated friendly relations with Dissenters. In Parliament he gave good service to his old schoolfellow, Robert Walpole, Prime Minister of Great Britain.

== Apologetics ==
The Deist Controversy was a debate from the late 17th century to the mid 18th century. The deists believed that there was a god worthy of worship who had created the world, denied special divine action beyond creation, consequently they believed that Christianity was a false religion. Sherlock as well as may other scholars argued against deist theology. The apologetics movement that Sherlock was part of provided an intellectual defense of the Christian religion.

Sherlock's argument for the evidences of the resurrection of Jesus Christ has continued to interest later Christian apologists such as William Lane Craig and John Warwick Montgomery. His place in the history of apologetics has been classified by Ross Clifford as belonging to the legal or juridical school of Christian apologetics.

== Writings ==
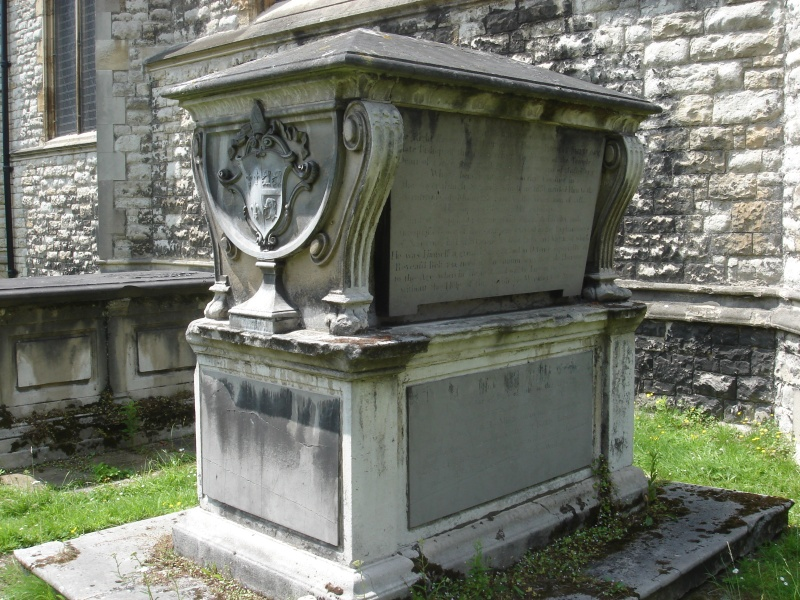
Sherlock's tomb monument at All Saints Church, Fulham

He published against Anthony Collins's deistic Grounds of the Christian Religion a volume of sermons entitled The Use and Intent of Prophecy in the Several Ages of the World (1725); and in reply to Thomas Woolston's Discourses on the Miracles he wrote a volume entitled The Tryal of the Witnesses of the Resurrection of Jesus (1729), which soon ran through fourteen editions. His Pastoral Letter (1750) on the late earthquakes had a circulation of many thousands, and four or five volumes of Sermons which he published in his later years (1754–1758) were also at one time highly esteemed. Jane Austen, wrote to her niece Anna in 1814, "I am very fond of Sherlock's Sermons, prefer them to almost any."

A collected edition of his works, with a memoir, in five volumes, by Thomas Smart Hughes, appeared in 1830.

Sherlock's Tryal of the Witnesses is generally understood by scholars such as Edward Carpenter, Colin Brown and William Lane Craig, to be a work that the Scottish philosopher David Hume had probably read, and to which Hume offered a counter viewpoint in his empiricist arguments against the possibility of miracles.

Sherlock also wrote a respected work entitled A Discourse Concerning the Divine Providence, in which he argues that the Sovereignty and Providence of God are unimpeachable.

== Notes ==
Academic offices
Preceded by Thomas Green	Vice-Chancellor of the University of Cambridge; 1714–1715	Succeeded by Daniel Waterland
Preceded by William Dawes	Master of St Catharine's College, Cambridge; 1714–1719	Succeeded by Thomas Crosse
Church of England titles
Preceded by William Hayley	Dean of Chichester; 1715 – 1727	Succeeded by John Newey
Preceded by William Baker	Bishop of Bangor; 1728–1734	Succeeded by Charles Cecil
Preceded by Benjamin Hoadly	Bishop of Salisbury; 1734–1748	Succeeded by John Gilbert
Preceded by Edmund Gibson	Bishop of London; 1748–1761	Succeeded by Thomas Hayter
