= Edward Hubbard =

Edward Hubbard may refer to:

- Edward Hubbard (architectural historian) (1937–1989), English architectural historian
- Edward Hubbard (cricketer) (1906–1969), Australian cricketer
- Edward Hubbard (priest) (1708–1741), English priest
- Edward L. Hubbard (born 1938), retired American Air Force officer
- Eddie Hubbard (1917–2007), American radio personality
