= Reginald Bainbrigge =

Reginald Bainbrigge, D.D. was an academic in the sixteenth century.

Bainbrigge was born in Middleton, and educated at St Catharine's College, Cambridge, graduating BA in 1508, M.A in 1510 and B.D in 1526. He held Livings at Downham, Stambourne, Brightlingsea, Steeple Bumpstead and Great Oakley. He was Fellow then Master of St Catharine's, holding office from 1529 until 1547. He died in 1555.
