= Donald Portway =

Academic, soldier, and author

Donald Portway CBE, TD, DL, JP, MA, FICE
- Born: 28 June 1887; Halstead, England
- Died: 19 March 1979 (aged 91); Cambridge, England

Academic background
- Education: Downing College, Cambridge

Donald Portway (28 June 1887 – 19 March 1979) was a British academic, soldier and author.

Portway was educated at Felsted School and Downing College, Cambridge. He was an assistant master at Britannia Royal Naval College, Dartmouth from 1912 to 1914 when he joined the Royal Engineers. In 1918 he became a Fellow of St Catharine's College, Cambridge. In 1919 he became a lecturer in Engineering at the university. He was subsequently Tutor, Senior Tutor and President of St Catharine's before becoming its Master in 1946, a post he held until 1957. He was Dean of the Faculty of Engineering and Professor of Mechanical Engineering at the University of Khartoum from 1957 until his retirement in 1961.
