= John Hills (priest) =

Priest and academic in the late 16th and early 17th centuries

John Hills, D.D. was a priest and academic in the late 16th and early 17th centuries.

Hills was born in Fulbourn and educated at Jesus College, Cambridge, graduating BA in 1583, M.A.in 1586 and B.D. in 1593. He became a Fellow at St Catherine's, eventually becoming its Master in 1607. He was Vice-chancellor of the University of Cambridge from 1616 to 1617. Hills was ordained on 20 May 1585. He became Rector of Fulbourn in 1591. He was Archdeacon of Stow from 1610 to 1612; and Archdeacon of Lincoln from 1612 until his death on 16 September 1626.
