= Thomas Crosse (priest) =

British priest and academic (1680–1736)

Thomas Crosse (22 October 1680 – 27 August 1736) was an Anglican clergyman, who was Master of St Catharine's College, Cambridge, and Vice-Chancellor of the University of Cambridge.

== Biography ==
Crosse was educated at Merchant Taylors' School, London, and was admitted to St Catharine's College, Cambridge, as a pensioner on 19 June 1699. He graduated with a Bachelor of Arts in 1702/3, was awarded a Master of Arts degree in 1706, and was made a Doctor of Divinity in 1717. At St Catharine's, he was Fellow from 1704, Taxor from 1706, Senior Proctor in 1716-7, and Master from 1719 to 1736. He was Vice-Chancellor of the University from 1720 to 1722.

He was ordained as a deacon in London on 19 September 1703, and as a priest on 3 June 1705. He was rector of Coton, Cambridgeshire, from 1710, and of Ashby with Oby and Thurne, Norfolk, from 1730 to 1736. He was prebendary of Norwich in 1719 and of York from 1723 to 1736.
