= W. H. S. Jones =

British writer, translator and academic

William Henry Samuel Jones FBA (8 April 1876 – 4 February 1963) was a British writer, translator, and academic. He was nicknamed Malaria Jones, because of his theory that malaria was instrumental in the downfall of the classical civilizations of Greece and Rome.

Jones was born and raised in Birmingham, and educated at Aston Grammar School and King Edward's School, Birmingham. He entered Selwyn College, Cambridge in 1894, graduating B.A. 1897, M.A. 1902, Litt.D. 1925. He taught Classics at The Perse School in Cambridge, and was appointed a Fellow of St Catharine's College, Cambridge in 1908, serving the college as Dean, Steward and Bursar, and President. He wrote two histories of the college, published in 1936 and 1951.

== Bibliography ==
- W. H. S. Jones (1907). Malaria: a neglected factor in the history of Greece and Rome. with an introduction by R. Ross and a concluding chapter by G. G. Ellett.
- W. H. S. Jones (1909). Malaria and Greek history. Manchester: University Press.
- W. H. S. Jones (1936). A history of St Catharine's College. Cambridge University Press.
- W. H. S. Jones (1947). The Medical Writings of Anonymus Londinensis. Cambridge: Cambridge University Press.

Academic offices
Preceded by	Dean of St Catharine's College, Cambridge	Succeeded by
Preceded by	Steward of St Catharine's College, Cambridge	Succeeded by
Preceded by Claude Hermann Walter Johns	Bursar of St Catharine's College, Cambridge; 1919-	Succeeded by
Preceded by	President of St Catharine's College, Cambridge	Succeeded by
