= The Bull Hotel, Cambridge =

Historic building

The Bull Hotel
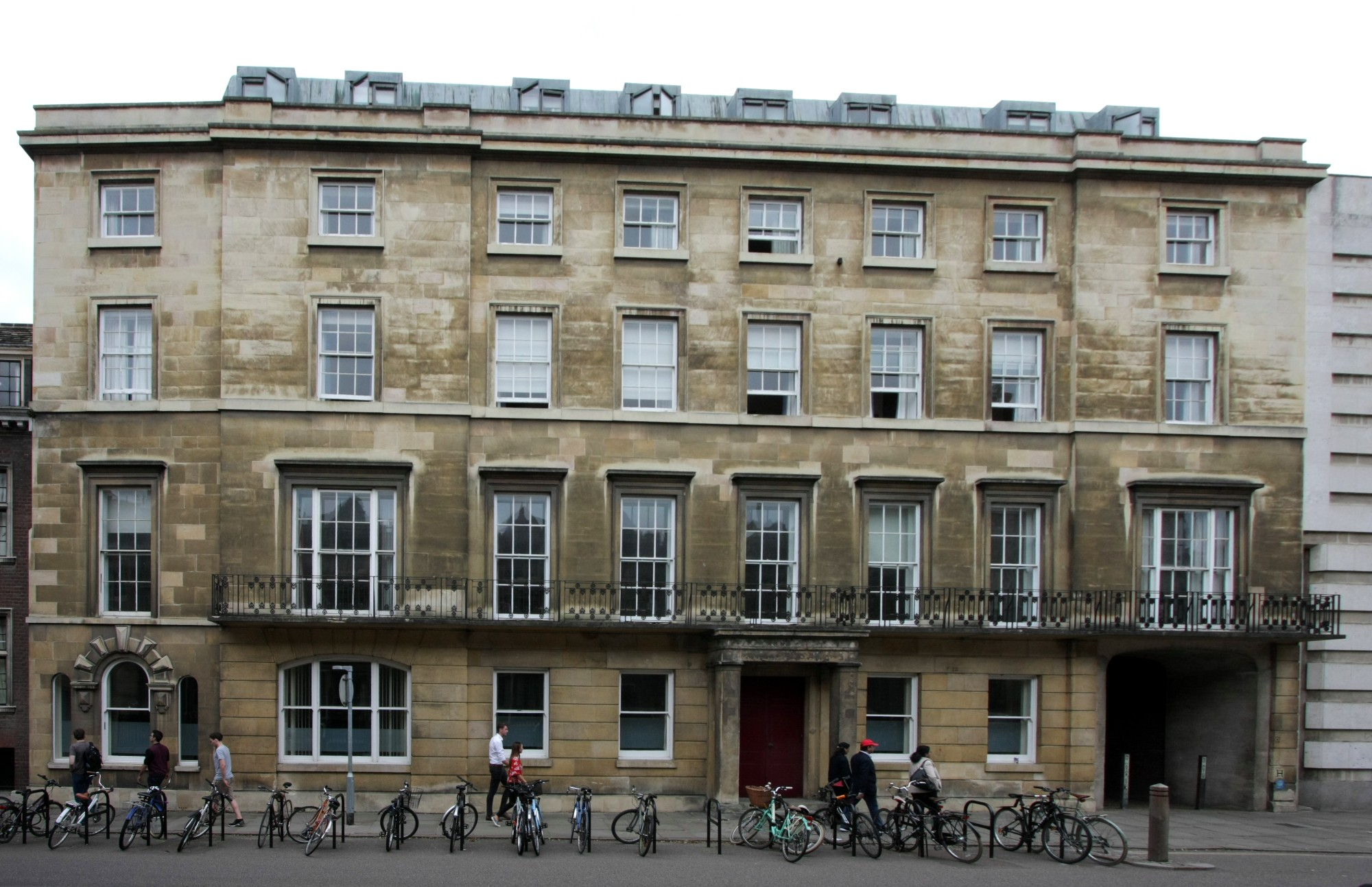

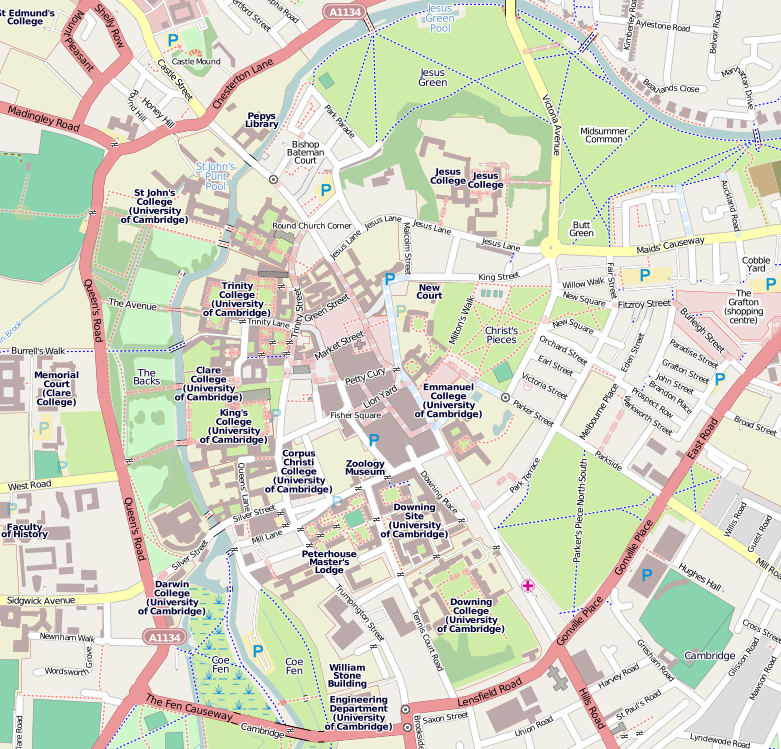
- Location within Central Cambridge

General information
- Location: 68 Trumpington Street, Cambridge, England
- Coordinates: 52.2034°N 0.1174°E
- Completed: 1828

The Bull Hotel was a historic hotel located at 68 Trumpington Street, Cambridge, England, next to St Catharine's College.

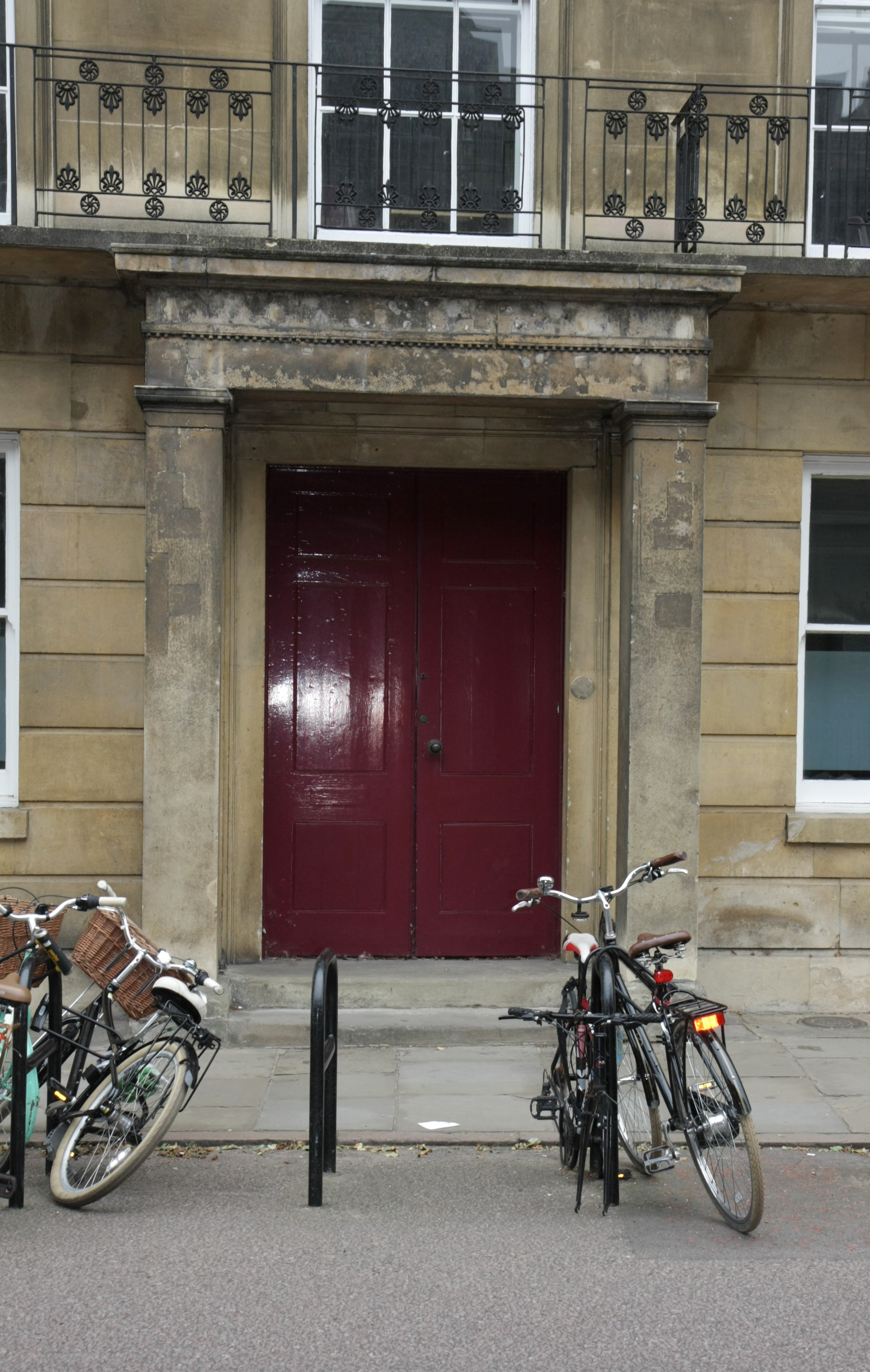
The entrance porch on Trumpington Street

The four-storey hotel was built in 1828, and occupies the site of an inn previously known as the Black Bull, which was in existence as early as the fifteenth century. The Black Bull was bequeathed to St Catharine's College in 1626 and rebuilt in 1828 and opened as a hotel. In 1936 two "acanthus'" type posts were said to flank the stone ashlar porch of the Bull Hotel.

It was one of the top hotels in Cambridge until the Second World War, when in 1941 the hotel became a centre for American serviceman. Photographs taken during the war show an American flag and a British flag on the hotel. At the end of the war the American servicemen established Bull College, named after the hotel and between 1945 and 1946 the hotel functioned as a centre for Russian courses for the British Army, but then merged with St Catharine's.

The building became a Grade II listed building on 26 April 1950.

== Notable residents ==
- Woodrow Wilson – stayed at the hotel in 1899.
