= Thomas Green (master) =

Thomas Green, or Greene, was an academic in the sixteenth century.

Green was born in Cockermouth. A fellow of Jesus College, Cambridge he was Master of St Catharine's, from 1507 to 1529; and Vice Chancellor of the University of Cambridge from 1523 to 1524.

During his term as Master, Green loaned money to the college for building works. On 5 May 1516, the Master and Fellows gave a bond to Green (the Master), for the payment of £20 on the next Michaelmas day. In April 1517, Green gifted £10 to the college to build four new rooms on the south side of the college, facing Queens lane. As a mark of gratitude, the Master and Fellows were required to offer prayers annually on 8 June 'for the souls of Thomas and Agnes Green .. while living and for his soul when dead'.
