= Cosign =

Cosign may mean:

- Co-signing, promising to pay another person's debt arising out of contract if that person fails to do so
- CoSign single sign on, a secure single sign-on web authentication system

== See also ==
- Cosine (disambiguation)
