= John Wardall =

John Wardall was Master of St Catharine's College, Cambridge from 1487 until 1506.

Wardall was born in Beelsby and educated at St Catharine's. After graduating MA he was ordained and held livings at Sparham and Lamport. He was buried at St Mary Bothaw on 5 February 1506.
