= Edward Hubbard (priest) =

English priest (1708–1741)

- Born: 5 February 1708; Ipswich, England
- Died: 22 December 1741 (aged 33); Cambridge, England
- Education: St Catharine's College, Cambridge
- Occupation(s): Priest, academic
- Title: Master of St Catharine's College, Cambridge
- Term: 1736–1741

Edward Hubbard (born Ipswich 5 February 1708 - died Cambridge 22 December 1741) was an English priest and academic.

Hubbard was educated at St Catharine's College, Cambridge, graduating BA in 1716 and MA in 1719. He was Fellow of St Catharine's from 1718 to 1736 and its Master from 1736 to his death. He was Vice-Chancellor of the University of Cambridge from 1739 to 1740. Hubbard was ordained on 21 February 1729; and was a prebendary of Norwich Cathedral.
