= Robert Woodlark =

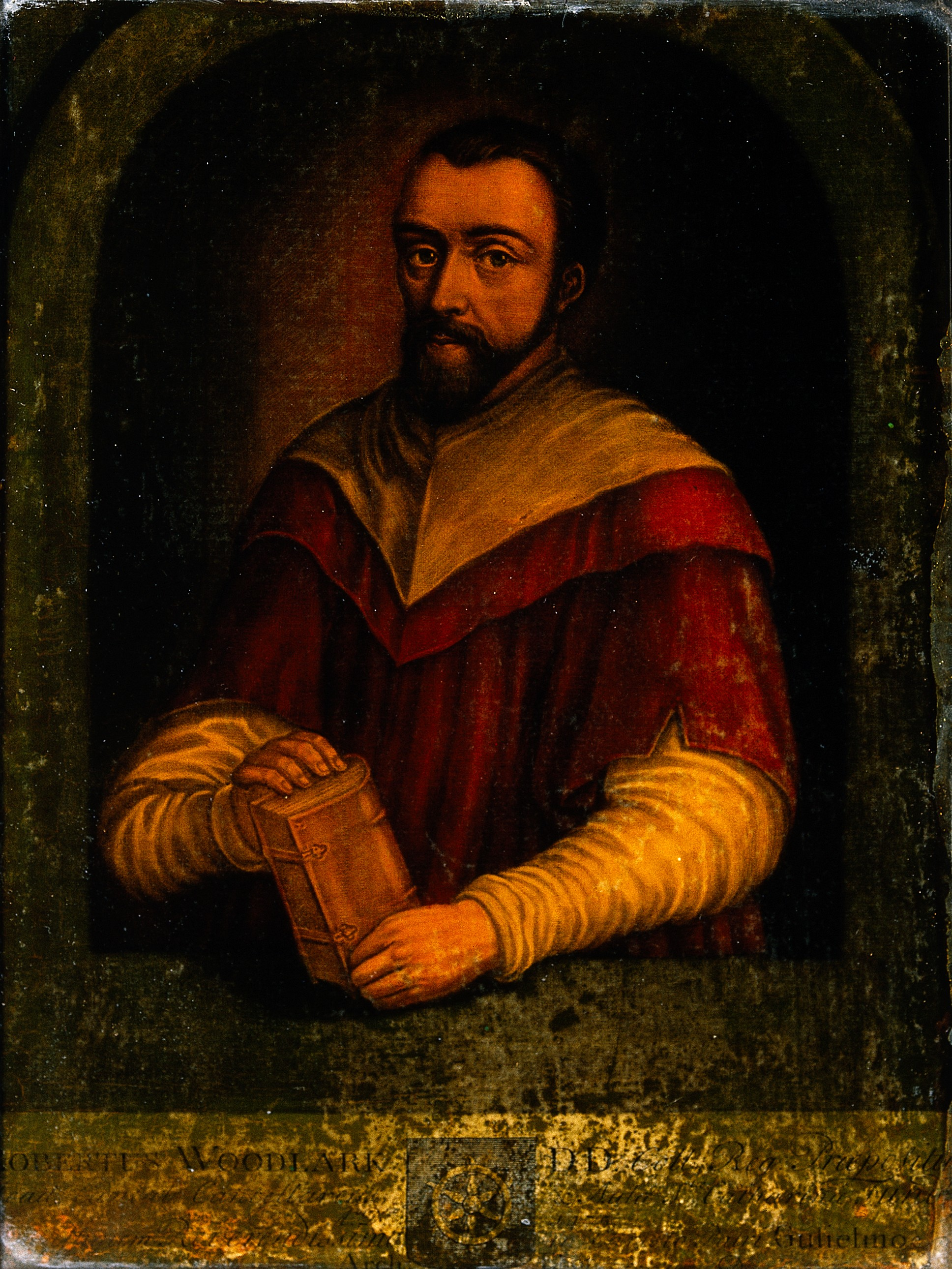
Robert Woodlark. Coloured mezzotint

Robert Woodlark (also spelled Wodelarke) was an English academic and priest. He was the Provost of King's College, Cambridge, and the founder of St Catharine's College, Cambridge. He was also a professor of sacred theology at the University.

He was the son of Richard Woodlark of Wakerley, Northamptonshire. Robert Woodlark was one of the founding Fellows of King's College in 1441. He was appointed Provost of King's in 1452, eventually being succeeded in 1479, by Walter Field. He was surveyor of King's College Chapel during its building and master of the works there, 1452–5.

While Provost of King's, Woodlark began the preparations for the foundation of a new college, which he established in 1473. He drew up the original statutes for the governance of the college and obtained a charter from Edward IV, 16 August 1475. His vision for the college was one populated by a small society of priests. Indeed, Woodlark's original statutes expressly excluded the teaching of medicine or law. Woodlark did not contemplate undergraduates at the college, instead desiring a small community of senior scholars of theology and philosophy.

Woodlark served as Chancellor of the University of Cambridge from 1459 to 1460, and again from 1462 to 1463.

Woodlark never served as Master of St Catharine's, instead appointing Richard Roche as the college's first true master in 1475.
