= John Braddocke =

English cleric

John Braddocke (1656–1719) was an English cleric.

== Life ==
Braddocke was a native of Shropshire, and received his education at St Catharine's Hall, Cambridge, where he was elected to a fellowship (B.A. 1674, M.A. 1678). On leaving the university about 1689, he became chaplain to Sir James Oxenden, 2nd Baronet, of Dean, near Canterbury, and chaplain to Dr. John Battely, rector of the neighbouring parish of Adisham. In 1694 he was nominated by Archbishop Tenison to the perpetual curacy of Folkestone, and on 1 April 1698 he was presented to the vicarage of St. Stephen's, alias Hackington, near Canterbury. On the promotion of Dr. Offspring Blackall, his contemporary at college and close friend, to the see of Exeter in 1707, Braddocke was made the bishop's chaplain, though he got nothing by the appointment except the title. In 1709 he was collated by Archbishop Tenison to the mastership of Eastbridge hospital in Kent. He died in his vicarage house on 14 August 1719, in his sixty-fourth year.

== Works ==
- The Doctrine of the Fathers and Schools considered, concerning the Articles of a Trinity of Divine Persons and the Unity of God. In answer to the Animadversions on the Dean of St. Paul's Vindication of the Doctrine of the Holy and ever Blessed Trinity, in defence of those sacred Articles, against the objections of the Socinians, and the misrepresentations of the Animadverter. Part I, 1695, 4to.
- Deus unus et trinus, 4to. This was entirely printed, except the title-page, but was suppressed, and never published, by the desire of Archbishop Tenison, who thought the controversy ought not to be continued.
