= Richard Pilkington (priest) =

English Anglican priest

The Venerable Richard Pilkington D.D was an Anglican priest in England.

Pilkington was educated at Emmanuel College, Cambridge, where he graduated B.A. in 1590, and Queen's College, Oxford. He held livings at Hambleden and Salkeld. He was Archdeacon of Leicester from 1625 until his death in 1631. He married Ann May, daughter of John May.
