= Edmund Hownde =

Edmund Hownde, D.D. was a priest and academic in the 16th century.

Hownde was born in Calais and educated at Trinity College, Cambridge, graduating BA in 1564, M.A.in 1567 and B.D. in 1574. He was a Fellow of Caius from 1573 to 1576; and Master of St Catharine's from 1577. Hownde was ordained on 20 January 1573. He was a Chaplain to Queen Elizabeth. He also held livings at Burton Coggles and Symondsbury, where he died in 1598.
