= William Cosyn (MP) =

English politician

William Cosyn (fl. 1421–1431) of Totnes, Devon, was an English politician.

He was a member (MP) of the parliament of England for Totnes in December 1421, 1423, 1425, 1427, 1429 and 1431.
