= Cosine (disambiguation) =

A cosine is a function of trigonometry. Cosine or Kosine may also refer to:

- Cosine, Saskatchewan
- COSine, an annual science fiction convention in Colorado Springs [COS], Colorado
- COSINUS, an experiment for dark matter detection
- Kosine, stage name of a music producer
- Kosinë, an Albanian village in the municipality of Qendër Piskovë

== See also ==
- Cosign (disambiguation)
