= Edmund Cosyn =

16th-century English Catholic academic

Edmund Cosyn (Cosin) (dates uncertain) was an English Catholic academic and Vice-Chancellor of Cambridge University of the middle sixteenth century.

== Life ==
He was born in Bedfordshire and entered King's Hall, Cambridge, as a Bible clerk. He received the degrees of B.A. early in 1535, M.A. in 1541, and B.D. in 1547.

He held the living of Grendon, Northamptonshire, which was in the gift of King's Hall, from 21 September 1538, to November, 1541, and successively, fellowships of King's Hall, St. Catharine's Hall, and of Trinity College, Cambridge. Early in Queen Mary's reign he was elected Master of St. Catharine's College, Cambridge, which brought him as gifts from the Crown the Norfolk rectories of St. Edmund, North Lynn (1533), Fakenham (1555), and the Norfolk vicarages of Caistor Holy Trinity, and of Oxburgh (1554). He was presented to the rectory of Thorpland by Trinity College in the following year.

He was also chaplain to Bishop Bonner of London and assistant to Michael Dunning, the Chancellor of the Diocese of Norwich. In 1558 he was elected Vice-Chancellor of Cambridge.

Being a Catholic, he refused to conform when Elizabeth I of England came to the throne, and hence in 1560 was forced to resign all his preferments. He went in 1564 to live in retirement in Caius College, Cambridge. Four years later, summoned to answer before the Lords of the Council to a charge of non-conformity, he went into exile rather than forswear his faith. He was living on the Continent in 1576 but no further definite records of his career are available.

== Notes ==
Academic offices
Preceded by Edwin Sandys	Master of St Catharine's College, Cambridge; 1554-1559	Succeeded by John May
