= Claude Hermann Walter Johns =

British Assyriologist

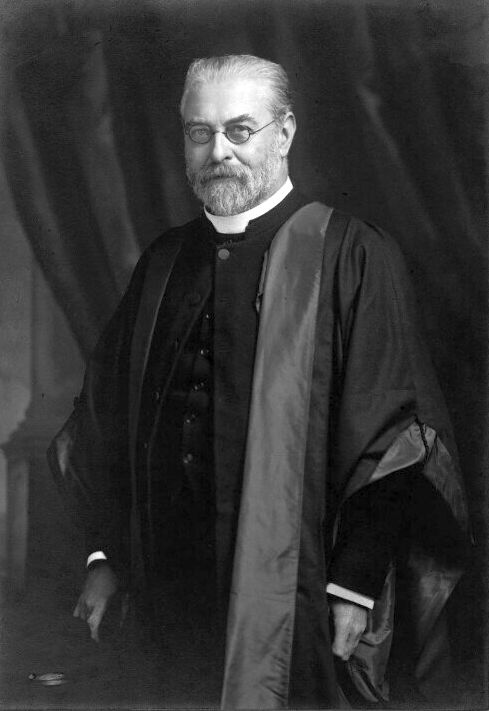
- Claude Hermann Walter Johns © National Portrait Gallery, London
- Born: 20 February 1857; Banwell, Somerset
- Died: 20 August 1920 (aged 63); Winchester
- Resting place: St Mary's Churchyard, Twyford
- Spouse: Agnes Sophia Griffith
- Scientific career
- Fields: Assyriology

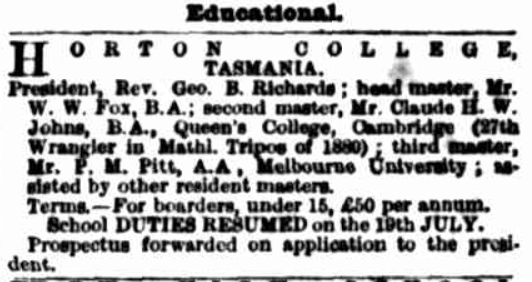
Display advertisement for Horton College, Tasmania, in: The Argus, Melbourne, 16 July 1880

Claude Hermann Walter Johns (20 February 1857 – 20 August 1920) was an Assyriologist and Church of England clergyman.

== Biography ==
He was born at Banwell, Somerset. He was educated at Queens' College, Cambridge (B.A., 1880), and was second master successively at Horton College, Tasmania, in 1880–84 and Paston Grammar School, in 1884–86.

Johns was ordered deacon in 1887 and ordained priest in the following year, and from 1887 until 1892 was tutor in St Peter's Training College for Schoolmasters, Peterborough, as well as curate of St Botolph's, Helpston (1887–88), and of St John's, Peterborough (1888–91).

In 1892 Johns became rector of St Botolph's Church, Cambridge. He was also chaplain of Queens' College from 1893 to 1901. He had taken up the study of cuneiform, encouraged by Sandford Arthur Strong, and from 1897 was lecturer in Assyriology at Cambridge University, as well as in Assyrian at King's College, London, from 1904. He was Edwards Fellow in Cambridge University from 1900, honorary secretary of the Cambridge Pupil Teachers' Centre from 1894 to 1900, and Master of St Catharine's College, Cambridge from 1909 to 1920 (also bursar, for some of this time).

== Personal life ==
Claude Johns married Agnes Sophia, daughter of the Reverend John Griffith, in 1910. He died at his home, Rathmines, Barnes Close, Winchester on 20 August 1920, and was buried on 24 August at St Mary's Churchyard, Twyford, Hampshire. Agnes died on 18 November 1949. They had no children.

== Bibliography ==
- Assyrian Deeds and Documents of the 7th Century B.C. (3 vols., Cambridge, 1898–1902)
- An Assyrian Doomsday-Book, or Liber Censualis of the District round Harran (Leipsig, 1901)
- The Oldest Code of Laws in the World, Promulgated by Hammurabi (Edinburgh, 1903)
- Babylonian and Assyrian Laws, Contracts, and Letters (New York, 1904)
- The Relations Between the Laws of Babylonia and the Laws of the Hebrew Peoples (London, 1914)
