= Richard Roche =

Master of St Catharine's College, Cambridge (fl. 1470s)

Richard Roche was Master of St Catharine's College, Cambridge from 1475 until 1480.

Roche was born in Taunton and educated at Eton College. After graduating MA he was ordained in 1457. He became a Fellow of King's College, Cambridge in 1469; and Rector of Little Shelford in 1473.
