= Coton, Cambridgeshire =

Village in Cambridgeshire, England

Coordinates: 52.21056°N 0.06398°E

Coton
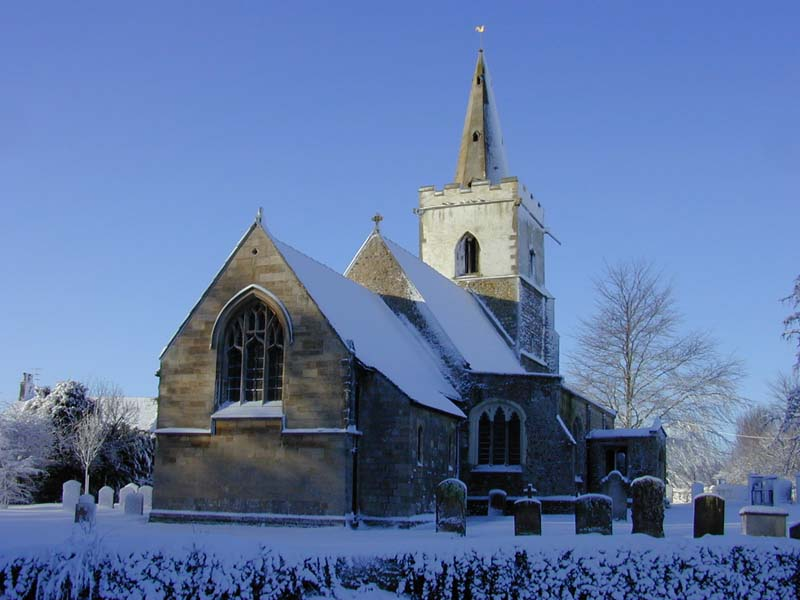
- St Peter's Church, Coton

- Location within Cambridgeshire
- Population: 910 (2011)
- OS grid reference: TL411589
- District: South Cambridgeshire
- Shire county: Cambridgeshire
- Region: East
- Country: England
- Sovereign state: United Kingdom
- Post town: CAMBRIDGE
- Postcode district: CB23
- Dialling code: 01954
- Police: Cambridgeshire
- Fire: Cambridgeshire
- Ambulance: East of England

Coton is a small village and civil parish about three miles (about 5 km) west of Cambridge in Cambridgeshire, England and about the same distance east of the Prime Meridian. It is in the district of South Cambridgeshire. The parish covers an area of 392 hectares (970 acres). In the 2001 census it had a population of 773, with approximately 336 dwellings and 322 households. The population at the 2011 census was 910.

== Location ==
Coton is approximately bounded to the north by the A1303 Madingley Road, which forms part of the Cambridge to St Neots road; to the west by open fields which separate the village from that of Hardwick; to the south by open fields separating it from Barton and to the east by the M11 motorway, which divides it from the city of Cambridge and, to the south-east, the village of Grantchester. Coton lies roughly equidistant from junctions 12 and 13 of the M11.

== History ==
The Domesday Book survey from 1086 lists Eustace II, the Count of Boulogne, as the holder of the main manor in Coton, which was then part of Grantchester parish. However, in the Middle Ages, Coton became a separate parish. There are no references to a separate Coton population prior to 1500, but by 1563, 21 families are recorded as living in the village. The population grew slowly over the next two centuries, reaching 126 by 1801 and then more than trebled to 390 during the 19th century. Further population growth came in the 1940s, when an estate of Council houses was built at the west end of the village (Whitwell Way) and in the 1960s, when further houses were built between the High Street and the 1940s estate.

The oldest building in Coton is St Peter's Church (there are some pictures and a description of the church at the Cambridgeshire Churches website), built in the 12th century as a chapel, dependent on Grantchester church. It gradually established its independence from Grantchester over the course of the 13th and 14th centuries. Some of the original building survives, including the nave (excluding its aisles), the chancel and the font. The shafted south-east angle of the 12th century nave is still visible outside, while the chancel has 12th century windows to the north and south. The aisles date from the 14th and 15th centuries. Extensive restoration work was undertaken in the 1870s and 1880s.

From the 16th century until the early years of the 20th century, most of the land in Coton belonged to Cambridge colleges, including St John's, Queens', King's and St Catharine's, which let it for farming.

In 1830, Coton was one of many villages in the south and east of England to suffer damage during the Swing Riots. One farmer had his farmstead burnt down with losses amounting to £1,720.

Notable former inhabitants of Coton include Andrew Downes, a scholar and Cambridge University Regius Professor of Greek in the late 16th century; and Sir John Coke, Secretary of State under Charles I from 1625 to 1639.

A book about the history of Coton has been written by a former Headmistress of both the old and new Coton schools, Kathleen Fowle: Coton Through the Ages and updated by the author in 2013, with help from Carolyn Postgate, and editor Elaine Storkey. It is available for purchase from the village church.

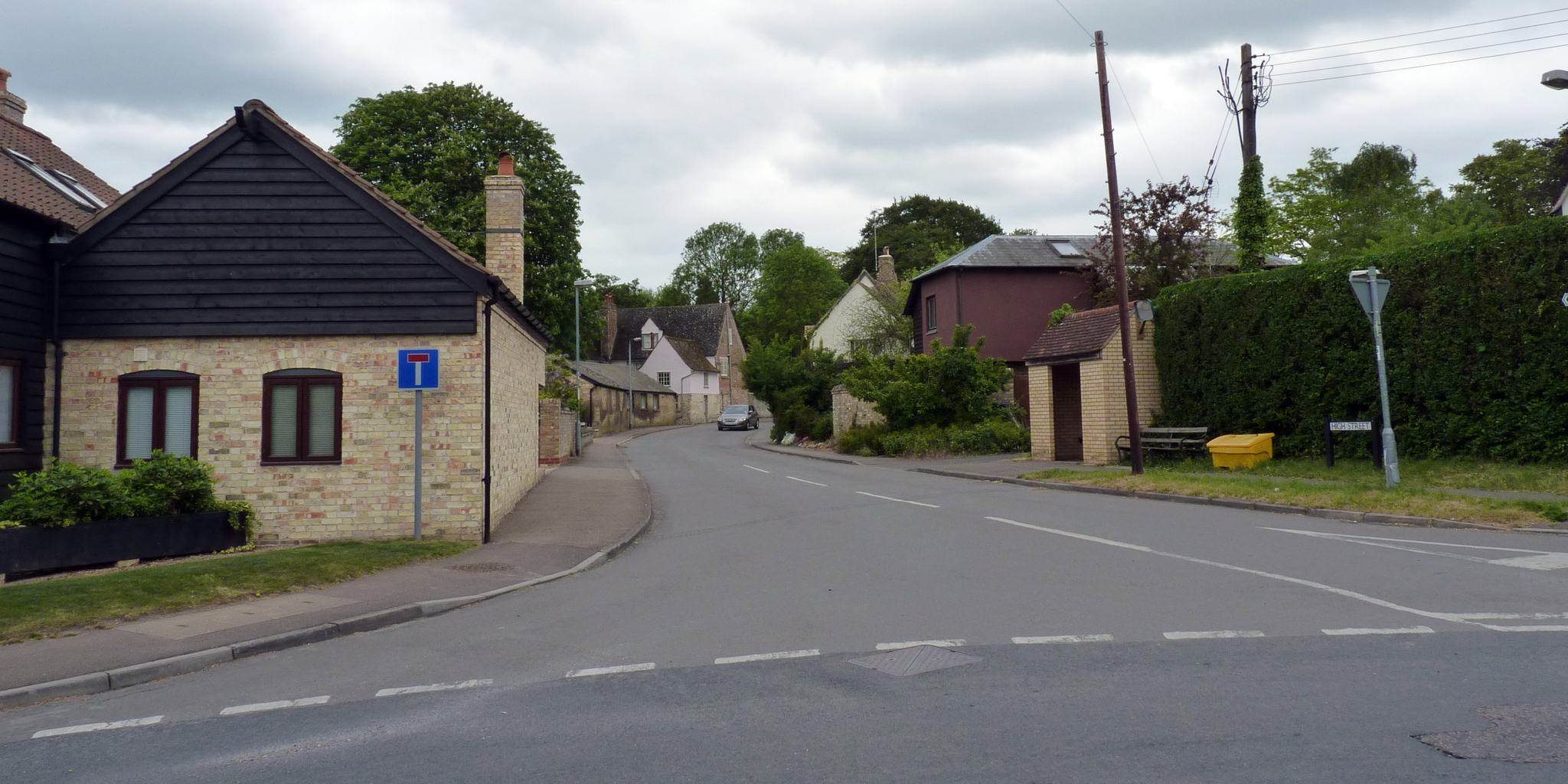
Coton High Street

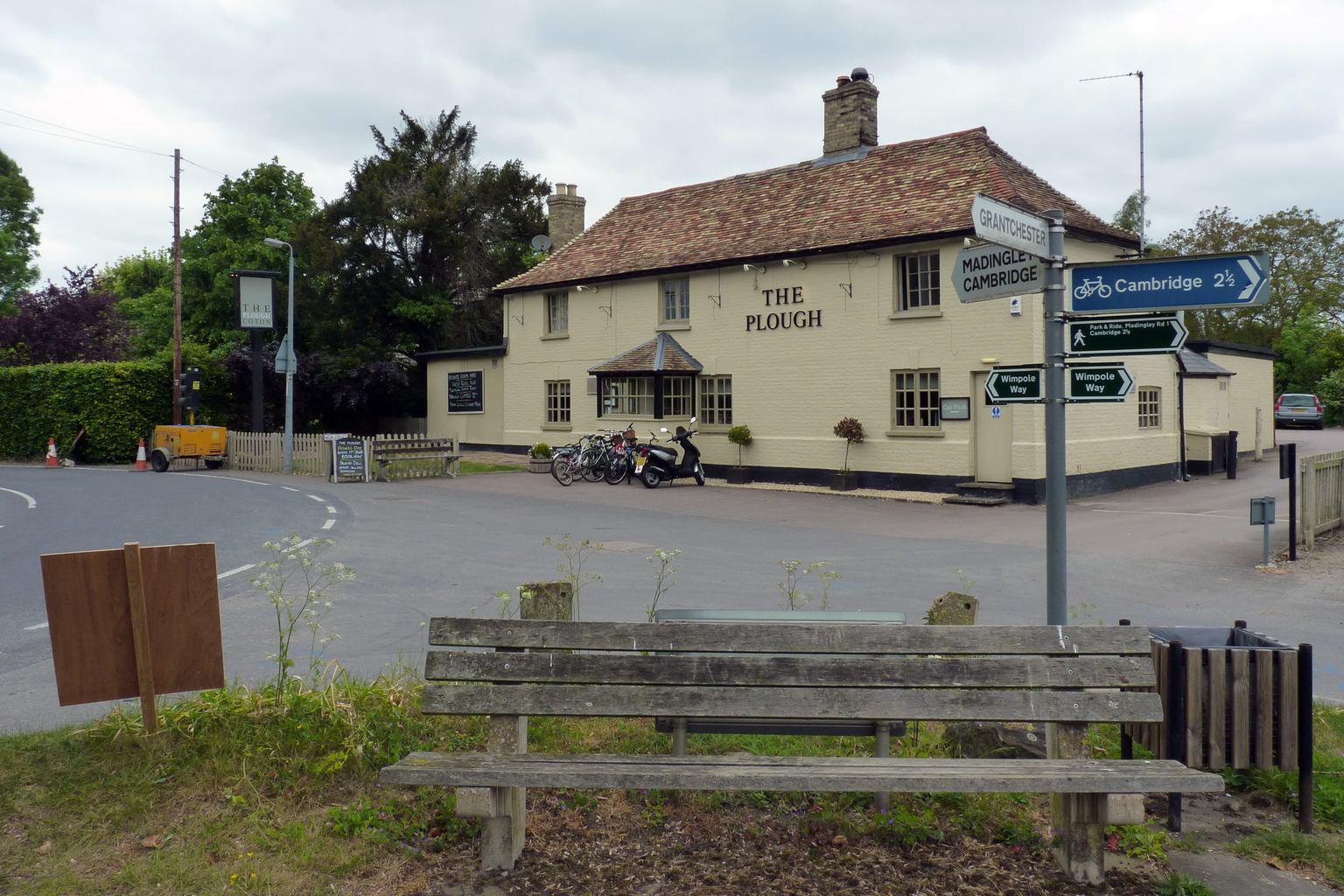
The Plough from the Coton recreation ground

== The village today ==
In addition to its church, Coton has a primary school with 140 pupils, a restaurant-pub (The Plough), a garden centre containing a post office, farm shop and cafe, football, cricket and bowls clubs, and a British Women's Institute group (closed in 2019) as well as other local clubs. The well-known Cambridge American Cemetery and Memorial is situated on the Coton stretch of Madingley Road. In recent years the Village Hall of Coton has been extended and refurbished, thanks to fundraising activities by local residents and the management of the village hall committee. It is now active, hosting an internet club, produce sales and local clubs, and becomes the village local cinema on Wednesdays each month. Coton Orchard, planted in 1922, produces mainly apple juice, supplying a number of Cambridge colleges.

The Coton Footpath is a recreational cycle or walk from Cambridge to Coton. It begins in the city centre, crossing the River Cam, passing alongside the University's West Cambridge site south of Madingley Road, then crossing the M11 motorway, bypassing Coton Orchard and terminating at the village recreation ground. On the roads and gardens around Coton it is often possible to see muntjac deer. The current concern in the village is the siting of a new proposed busway close to the village boundary and bisecting the orchard, and a Park and Ride facility on Madingley Hill, and meetings are underway with the Cambridgeshire planners.

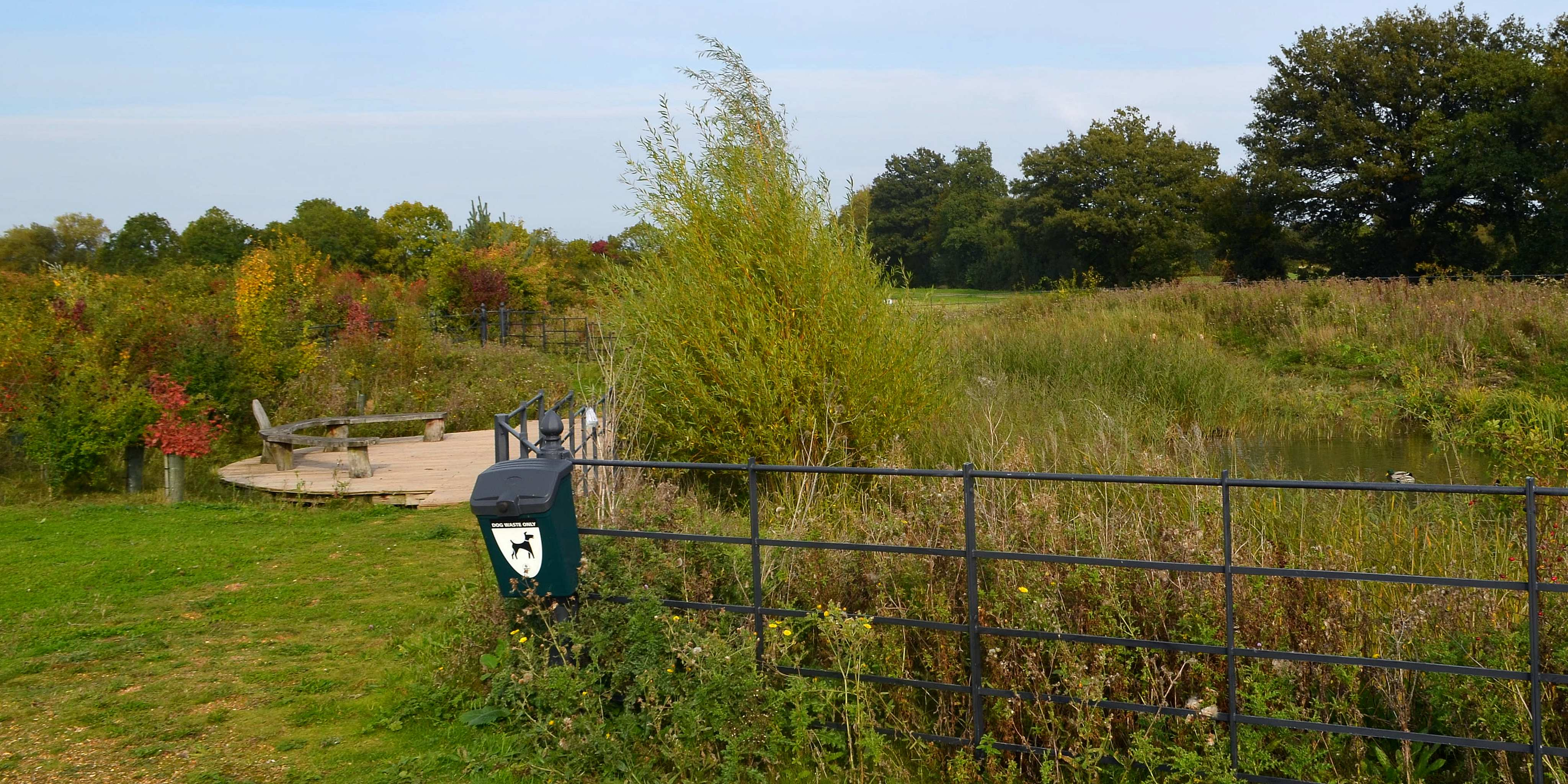
Coton Countryside Reserve pond

== Nearby villages ==
- Madingley
- Grantchester
- Hardwick
- Barton
- Comberton

== See also ==
- List of places in Cambridgeshire
- Madingley Road (A1303) to Cambridge
