= St Catharine's College, Cambridge =

College of the University of Cambridge

Coordinates: 52°12′10″N 0°07′01″E

St Catharine's College
- University of Cambridge
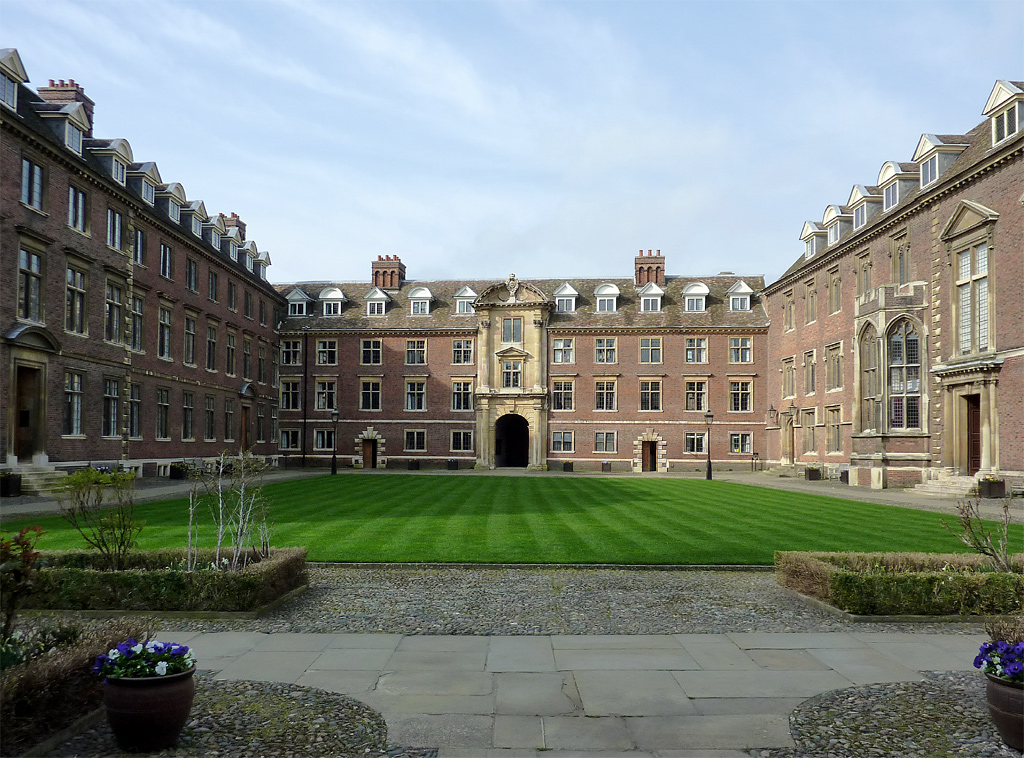
- Main Court, St Catharine's College

- Arms of St Catharine's College; Arms: Gules, a Catharine wheel Or.
Scarf colours: burgundy, with narrow pearl pink stripes
- Location: Trumpington Street (map)
- Full name: The College or Hall of St Catharine the Virgin in the University of Cambridge
- Latin name: Aula sancte Katerine virginis infra Universitatem Cantabrigie
- Abbreviation: CTH
- Nickname: Catz
- Founder: Robert Woodlark
- Established: 1473; 553 years ago
- Named after: Catherine of Alexandria
- Former names: Katharine Hall (1473–1860)
- Sister college: Worcester College, Oxford
- Master: Sir John Benger
- Undergraduates: 493 (2022-23)
- Postgraduates: 296 (2022-23)
- Endowment: £113m (2020)
- Website: www.caths.cam.ac.uk
- JCR: www.catzjcr.com
- MCR: mcr.caths.cam.ac.uk
- Boat club: St Catharine's College Boat Club

Map
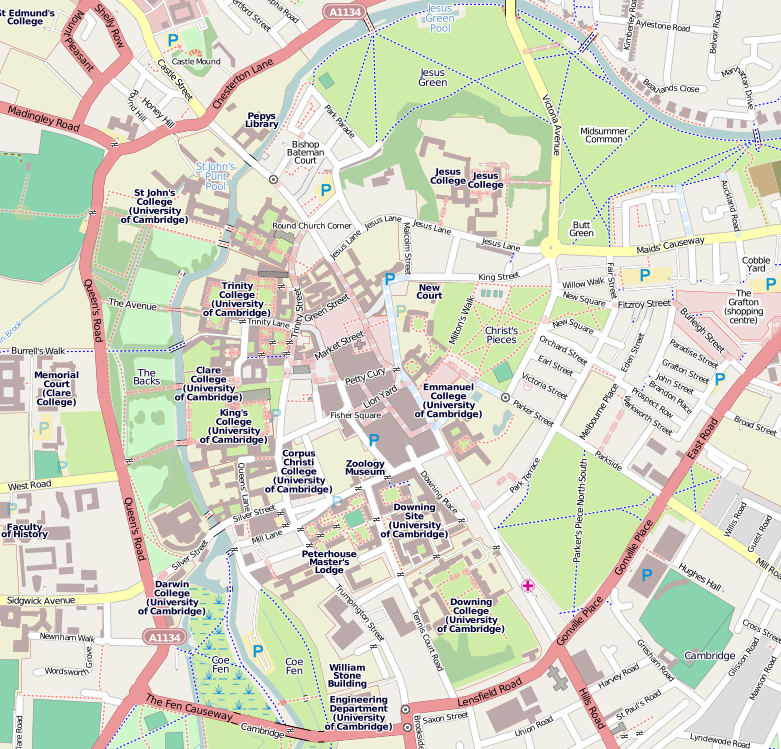
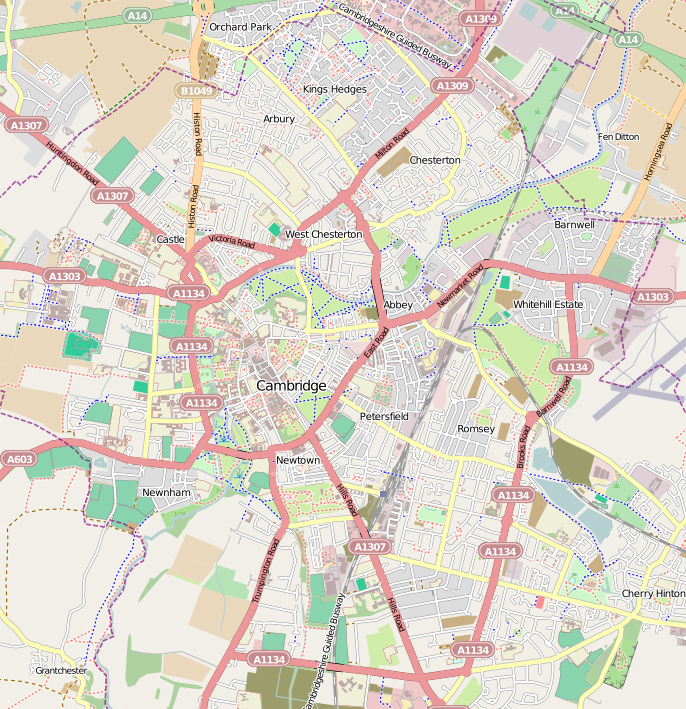
- Location within Central Cambridge Location within Cambridge

St Catharine's College is a constituent college of the University of Cambridge, England. Founded in 1473 as Katharine Hall, it adopted its current name in 1860. The college is nicknamed "Catz". The college is located in the historic city-centre of Cambridge, and lies just south of King's College and across the street from Corpus Christi College. The college is notable for its open court (rather than closed quadrangle) that faces towards Trumpington Street.

The college community consists of approximately 1000 Fellows, graduate and undergraduate students, and staff. The college is led by a Master, and the college is run by a governing body comprising the official and professorial Fellows of the college, chaired by the Master. The current Master, Sir John Benger took up office on 1 October 2023.

== History ==
=== Foundation ===
Robert Woodlark, Provost of King's College, had begun preparations for the founding of a new college as early as 1459 when he bought tenements on which the new college could be built. The preparation cost him a great deal of his private fortune (he was suspected of diverting King's College funds), and he was forced to scale down the foundation to only three fellows. He stipulated that they must study theology and philosophy only. The college was established as "Lady Katharine Hall" in 1473. The college received its royal charter of incorporation in 1475 from Edward IV. Woodlark may have chosen the name in homage to the mother of Henry VI who was Catherine of Valois, although it is more likely that it was named as part of the Renaissance cult of Catherine of Alexandria, a patron saint of learning. The college was formally founded on St Catherine's day (25 November) 1473. The Catharine wheel, a symbol of the saint's martyrdom, appears on the college arms.

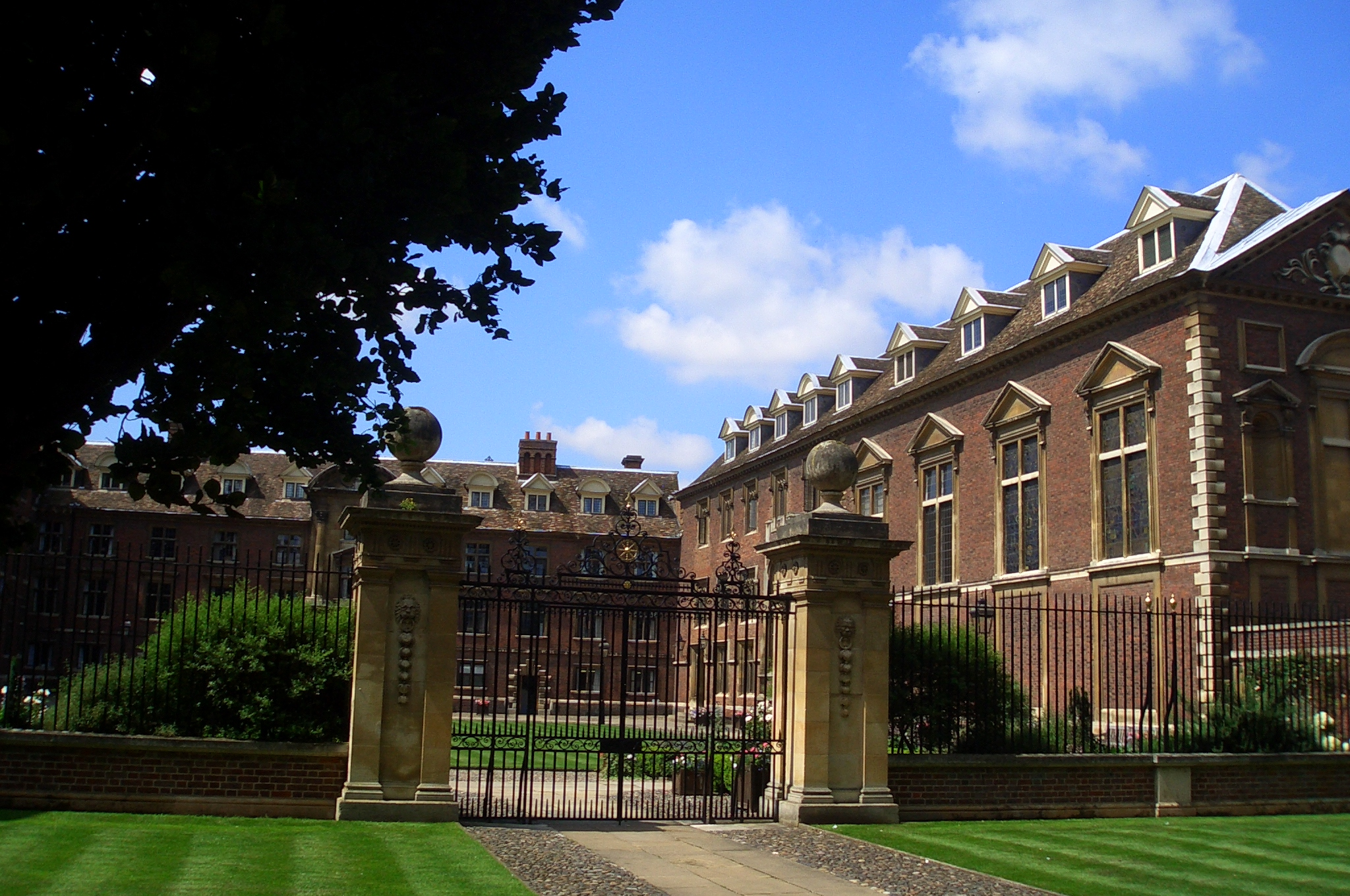
St Catharine's, as seen from Trumpington Street

The initial foundation was not well-provided for. Woodlark was principally interested in the welfare of fellows and the college had no undergraduates for many years. By 1550, however, there was a number of junior students and the focus of the college changed to that of teaching undergraduates.

=== The Robinson vote ===
In 1861, the master, Henry Philpott became Bishop of Worcester, and stood down. Two of the five Fellows of the college stood for election: Charles Kirkby Robinson and Francis Jameson. Jameson voted for his rival; however, Robinson voted for himself and won the election. The episode brought the college into disrepute for some years. Robinson's long tenure as master only ended with his death in 1909.

=== Expansion and modern day ===
As the college entered the 17th century, it was still one of the smallest colleges in Cambridge. However, a series of prudent masters and generous benefactors were to change the fortunes of the college and expand its size. Rapid growth in the fellowship and undergraduate population made it necessary to expand the college, and short-lived additions were made in 1622. By 1630 the college began to demolish its existing buildings which were decaying, and started work on a new court. In 1637 the college came into possession of the George Inn (later the Bull Hotel) on Trumpington Street. Behind this Inn was a stables which was already famous for the practice of its manager, Thomas Hobson, not to allow a hirer to take any horse other than the one longest in the stable, leading to the expression "Hobson's choice", meaning "take it or leave it".

The college was granted new statutes in 1860 and adopted its current name. In 1880, a movement to merge the college with King's College began. The two colleges were adjacent and it seemed a solution to King's need for more rooms and St Catharine's need for a more substantial financial basis. However, the Master (Charles Kirkby Robinson) was opposed and St Catharine's eventually refused.

In 1979, the membership of the college was broadened to welcome female students, and in 2006 the first woman was appointed as Master of the college, Dame Jean Thomas. A history of the college was written by W. H. S. Jones in 1936.

In 2015, St Catharine's became the first college in Cambridge to implement a gender-neutral dress code for formal hall.

During the 2020 COVID-19 pandemic, St Catharine's, in collaboration with Cambridge Women's Aid, allowed women who were escaping domestic abuse to stay in college accommodation. Between 27 April and 3 September, women and children were provided with accommodation for a combined 1,456 nights.

== Buildings ==
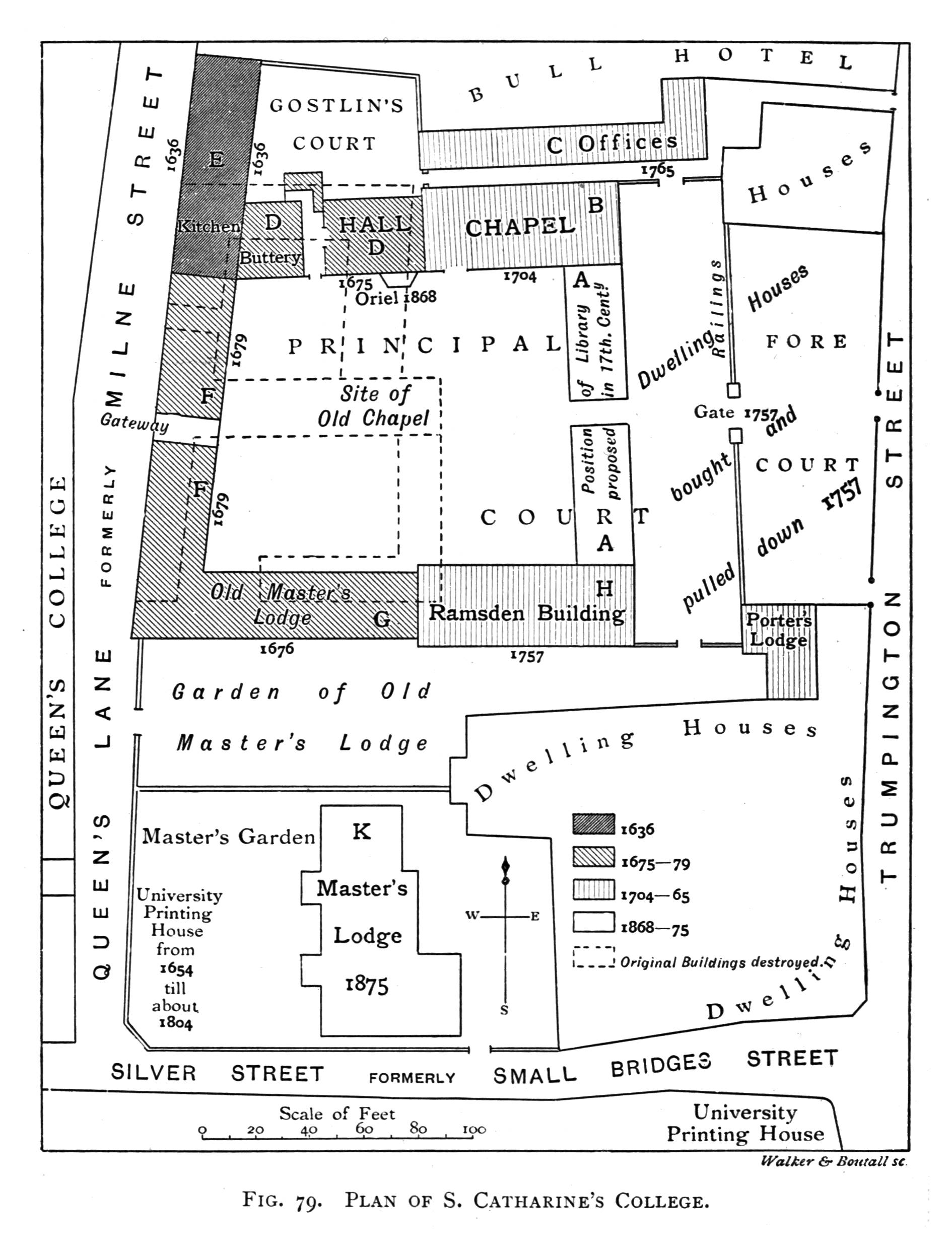
Plan of the college in 1897, showing stages of development

By 1630 the college began to demolish its existing buildings which were decaying, and started work on a new court. In 1637 the college came into possession of the George Inn (later the Bull Hotel) on Trumpington Street. The period of 1675 to 1757 saw the redevelopment of the college's site into a large three-sided court, one of only six at Oxbridge colleges; the others are at Sidney Sussex, Jesus and Downing at Cambridge, and Trinity College and Worcester, St Catharine's sister college, at Oxford. Proposals for a range of buildings to complete the fourth side of the court have been made on many occasions.

In 1966 a major rebuilding project took place under the mastership of Professor E. E. Rich. This saw the creation of a new larger hall, new kitchens and an accommodation block shared between St Catharine's and King's College. Pressure on accommodation continued to grow, and in 1981 further accommodation was built at St Chad's on Grange Road, with further rooms added there in 1998. In 2013 the college completed the building of a new lecture theatre, college bar and JCR.

Between September 2020 and August 2022, the facilities at the Trumpington Street site of St Catharine's were renovated as part of the "Central Spaces project". A temporary hall was erected on the main court and named "Catzebo", a portmanteau of "Catz" and "gazebo" for its tent-like appearance. The name was chosen by the Head Porter following an advisory student vote in which "Catzebo" was put forward by Robson Tebbutt, a student. The official opening for the newly built areas occurred in early October 2022, and the overall cost was stated to be around £16 million.

== Academics ==
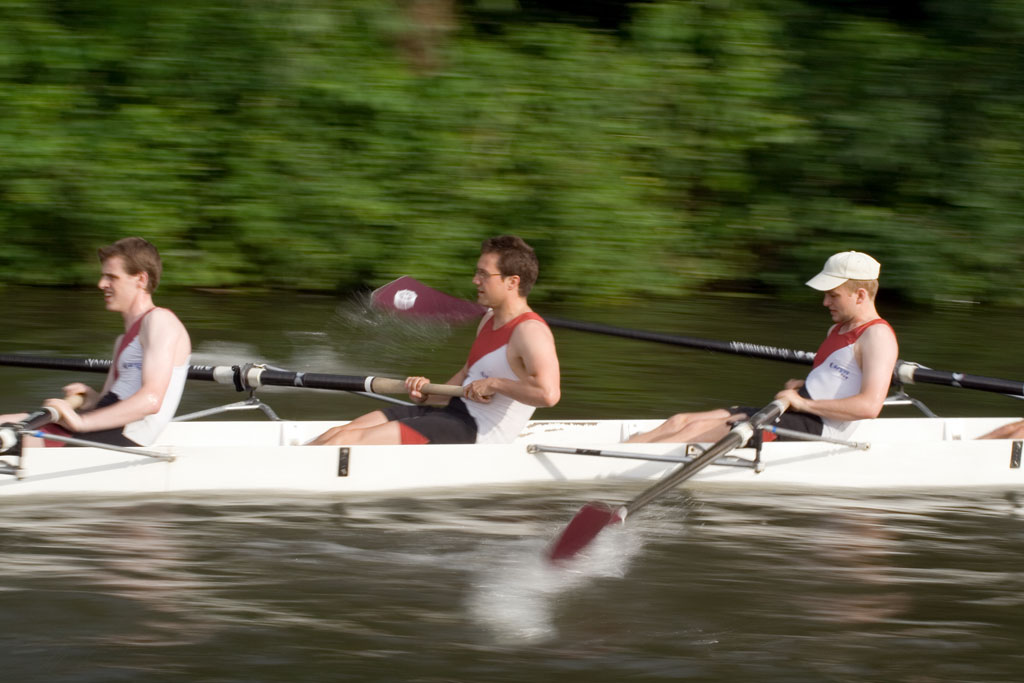
St Catharine's College Boat Club in the May Bumps

Historically, St Catharine's has generally been placed in the top third of the Tompkins Table (the annual league table of Cambridge colleges), though its position tends to vary year on year. In 2014, its position slipped to 21st, but rose to 13th in 2015 with more than 25% of students gaining First-class honours, and it has further risen to 10th in 2018 with more than 30% gaining a First. The first time the college had been placed at the top of the Tompkins Table was in 2005. Between 1997 and 2010, the college averaged 9th of 29 colleges.

== Student life ==
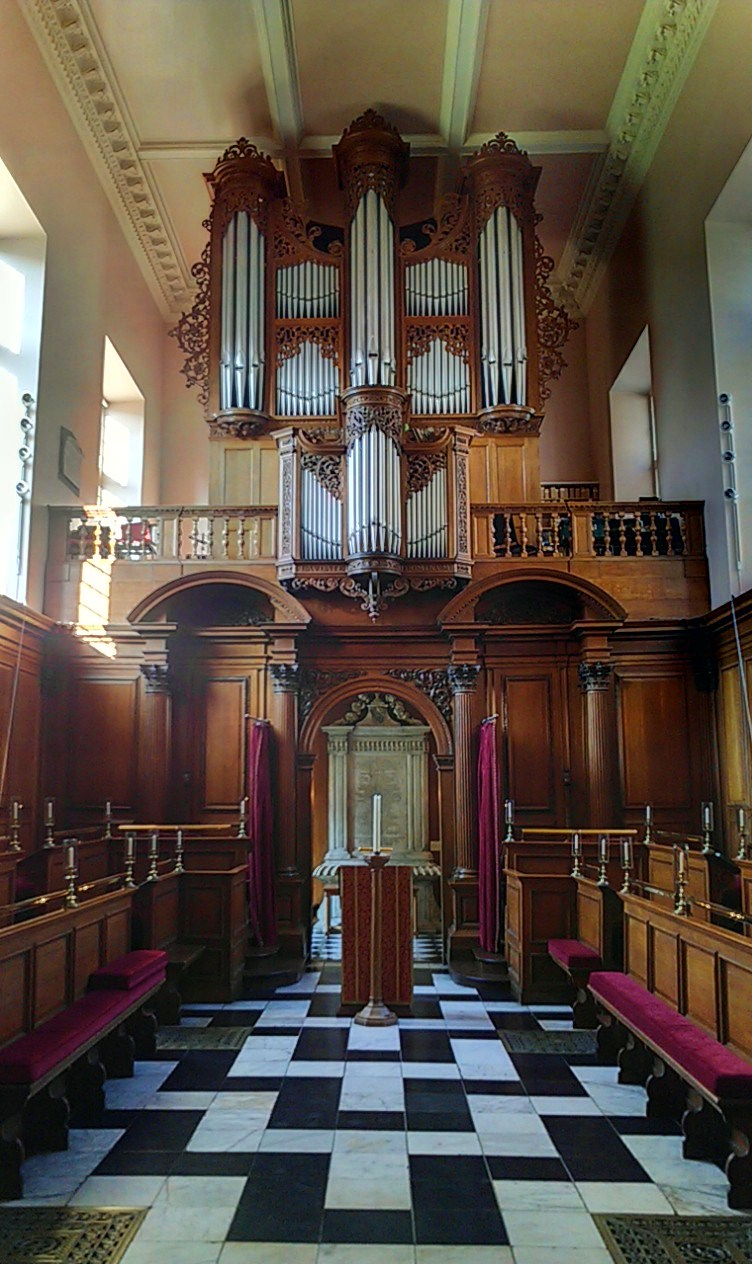
Chapel at the college

=== Intercollegiate rivalries ===
The college maintains a friendly rivalry with Queens' College after the construction of the main court of St Catharine's College on Cambridge's former High Street relegated one side of Queens' College into a back alley. A more modern rivalry with Robinson College resulted from the construction in the 1970s of a modern block of flats named St Chad's (in which the rooms are octagonal to resemble the wheel on the college crest) by the University Library.

=== Sports ===
The college has a reputation in hockey and racquet sports, in part due to its facilities for these sports including grass tennis courts and an astroturf hockey pitch. The football club enjoyed its most dominant years in the late 1970s winning Cuppers four times consecutively from 1975 to 1978, although a recent merger with St Edmund's College Hockey Club (SECHC) saw them return to the winner's list in 2024. St Catharine's College Boat Club has both Men's and Women's 1st boats residing in the middle of the 1st division of the May Bumps races.

=== Music ===
The college has had a reputation for music since its alumnus musicologist Peter le Huray served as its Director of Music during the 1960s, as which he commissioned the college's extant premier organ, from Cambridge organ-builder William Johnson, which was completed in 1979 and is now in need of repair.

The college-based girls' choir is the first of its kind in a UK university and is composed of girls aged 8–14 from local schools.

=== Other ===
The college hosts several other notable societies. The Shirley Society is the college literary society, the oldest in Cambridge; it hosts significant figures from the arts.

== Notable alumni ==
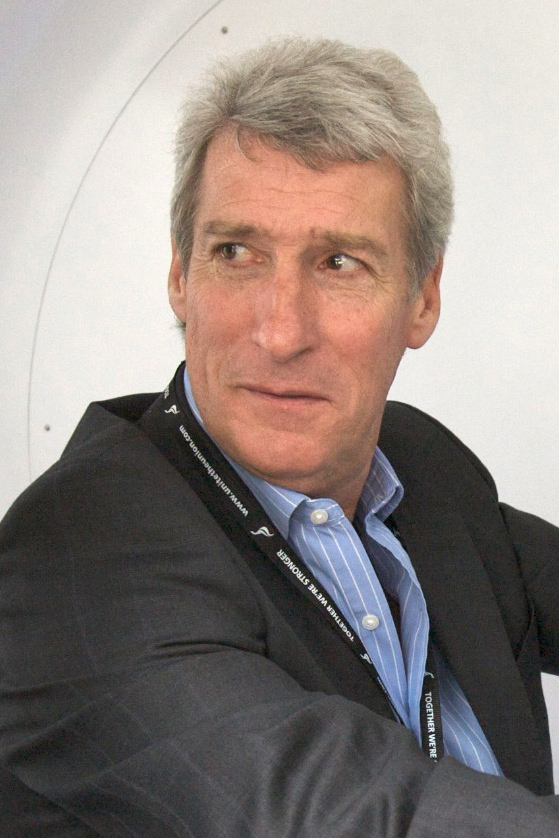
Jeremy Paxman, journalist.

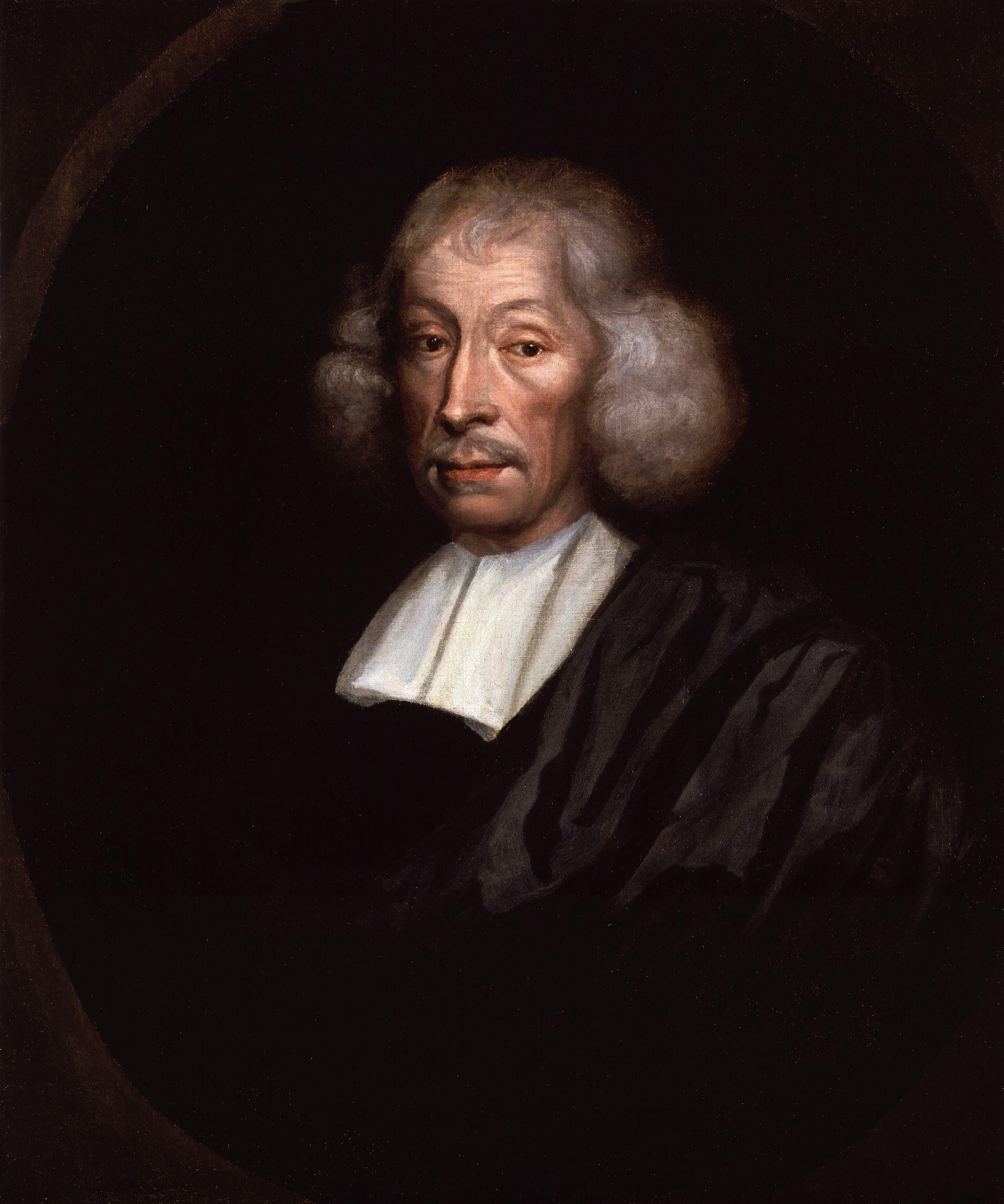
John Ray, naturalist.

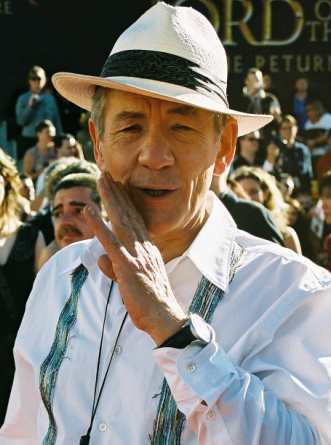
Sir Ian McKellen, actor.

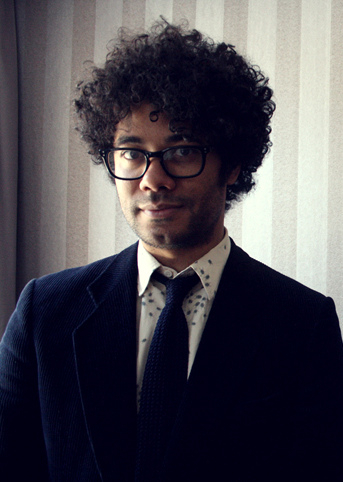
Richard Ayoade, comedian and actor.

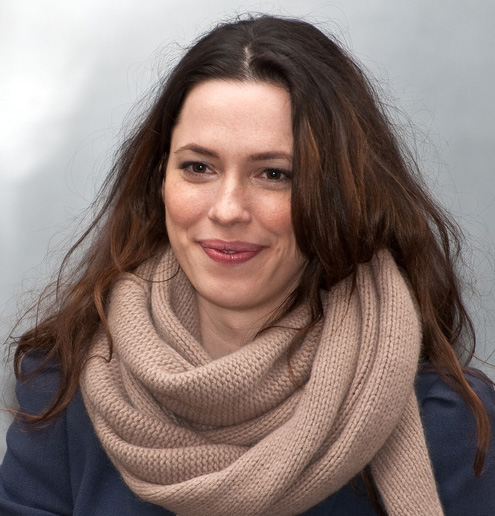
Rebecca Hall, actress.

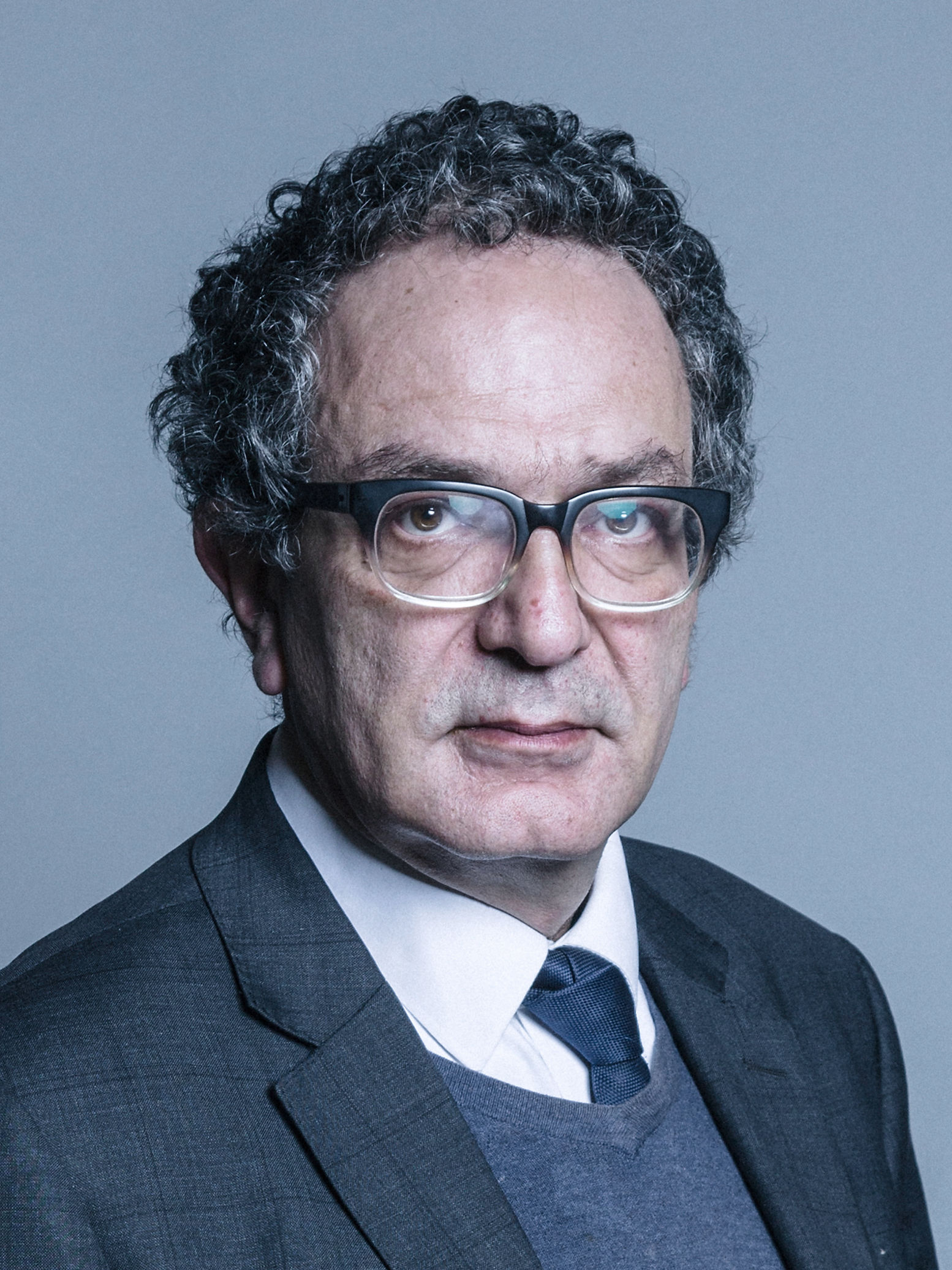
Lord Glasman, influential Labour thinker and peer.

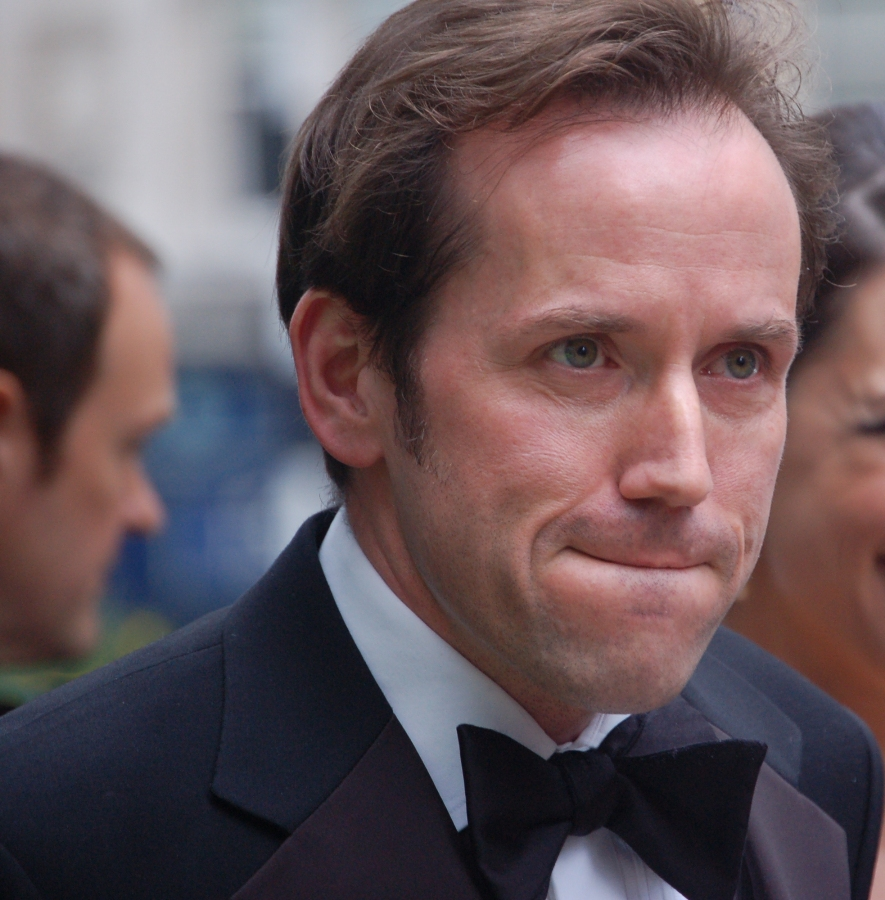
Ben Miller, comedian and actor.

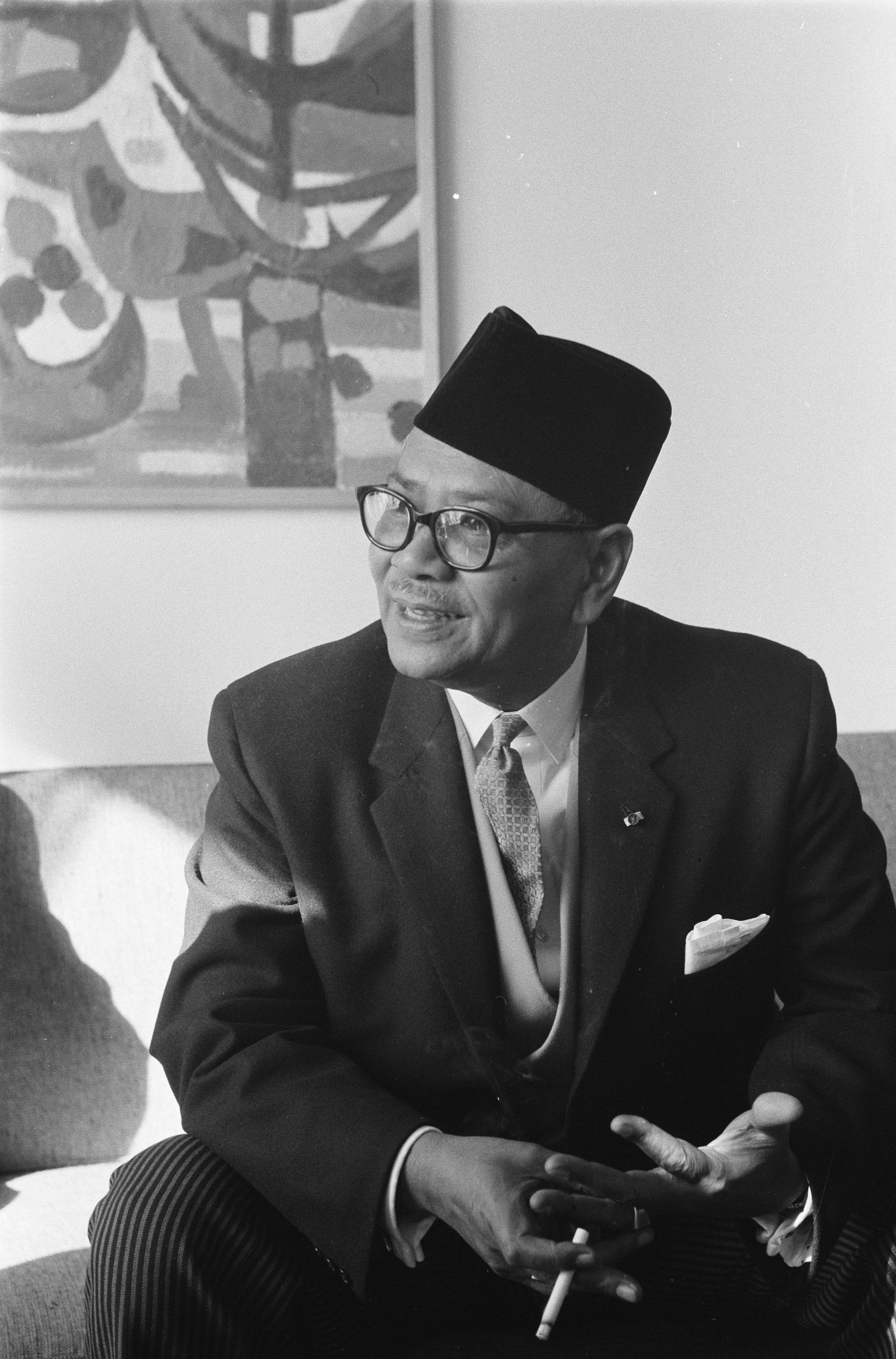
Tunku Abdul Rahman, the first Prime Minister of Malaysia.

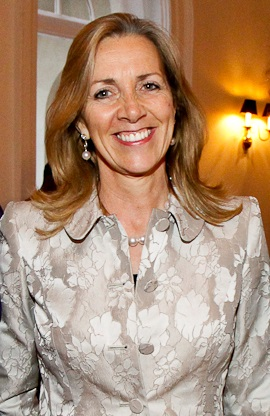
Rona Fairhead, Chairwoman of the BBC Trust.

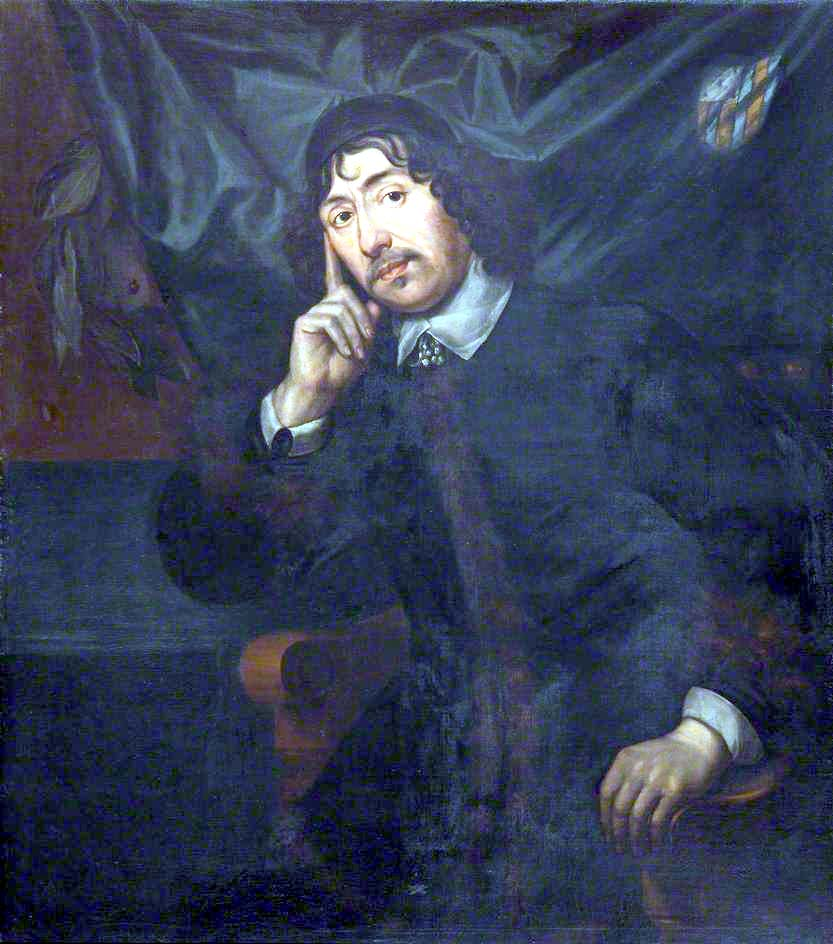
James Shirley, dramatist.

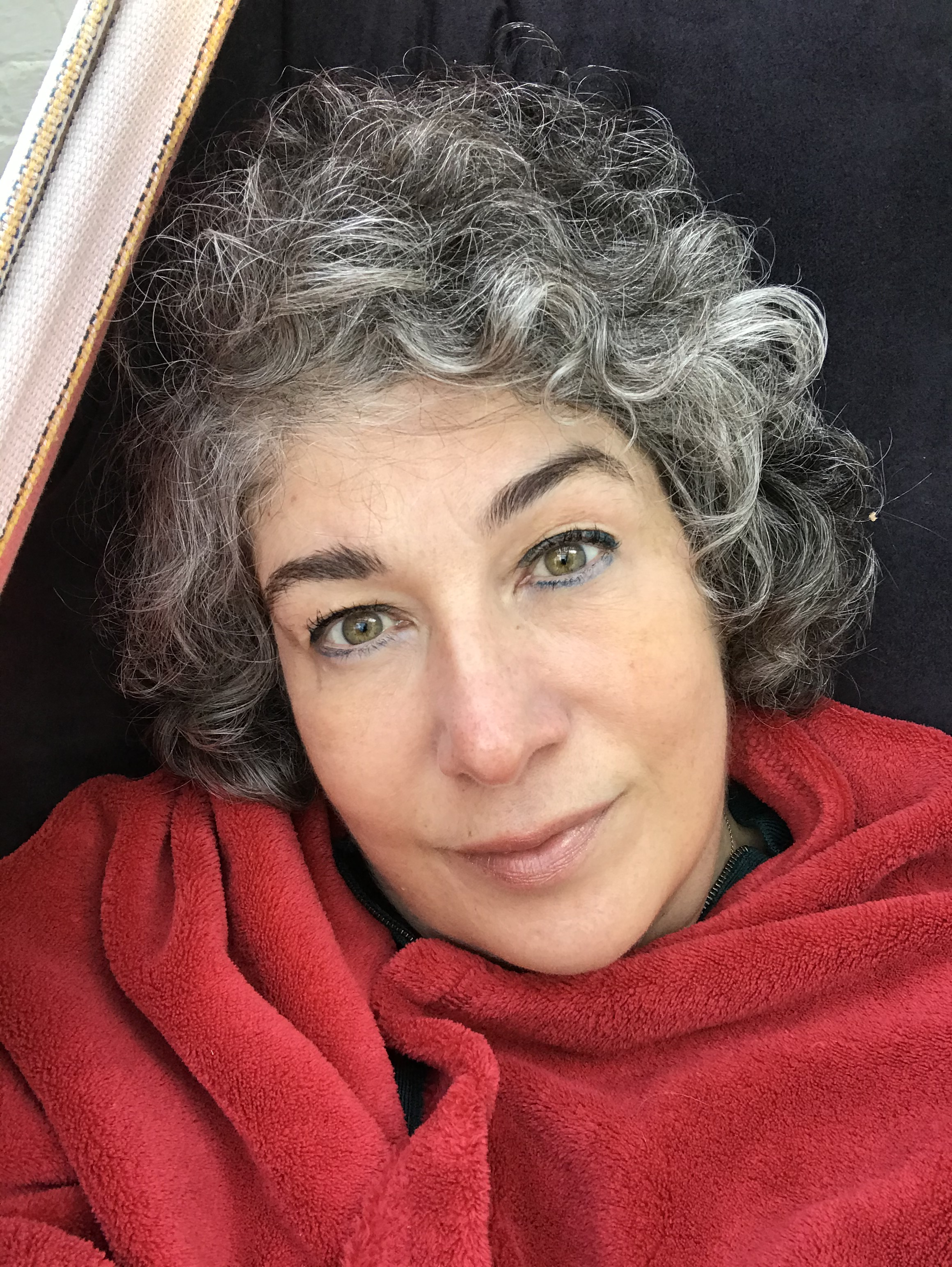
Joanne Harris, author.

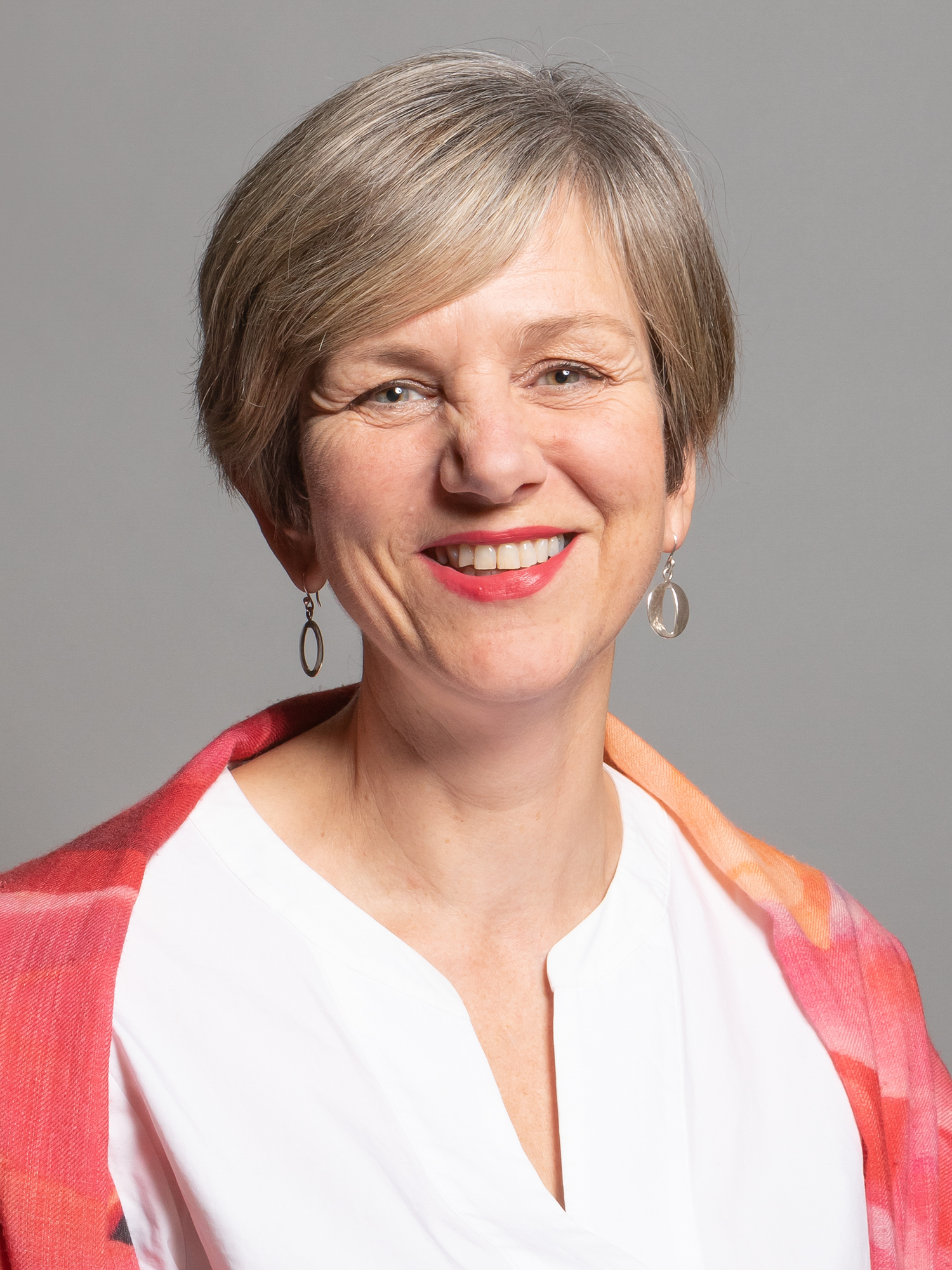
Lilian Greenwood, MP.

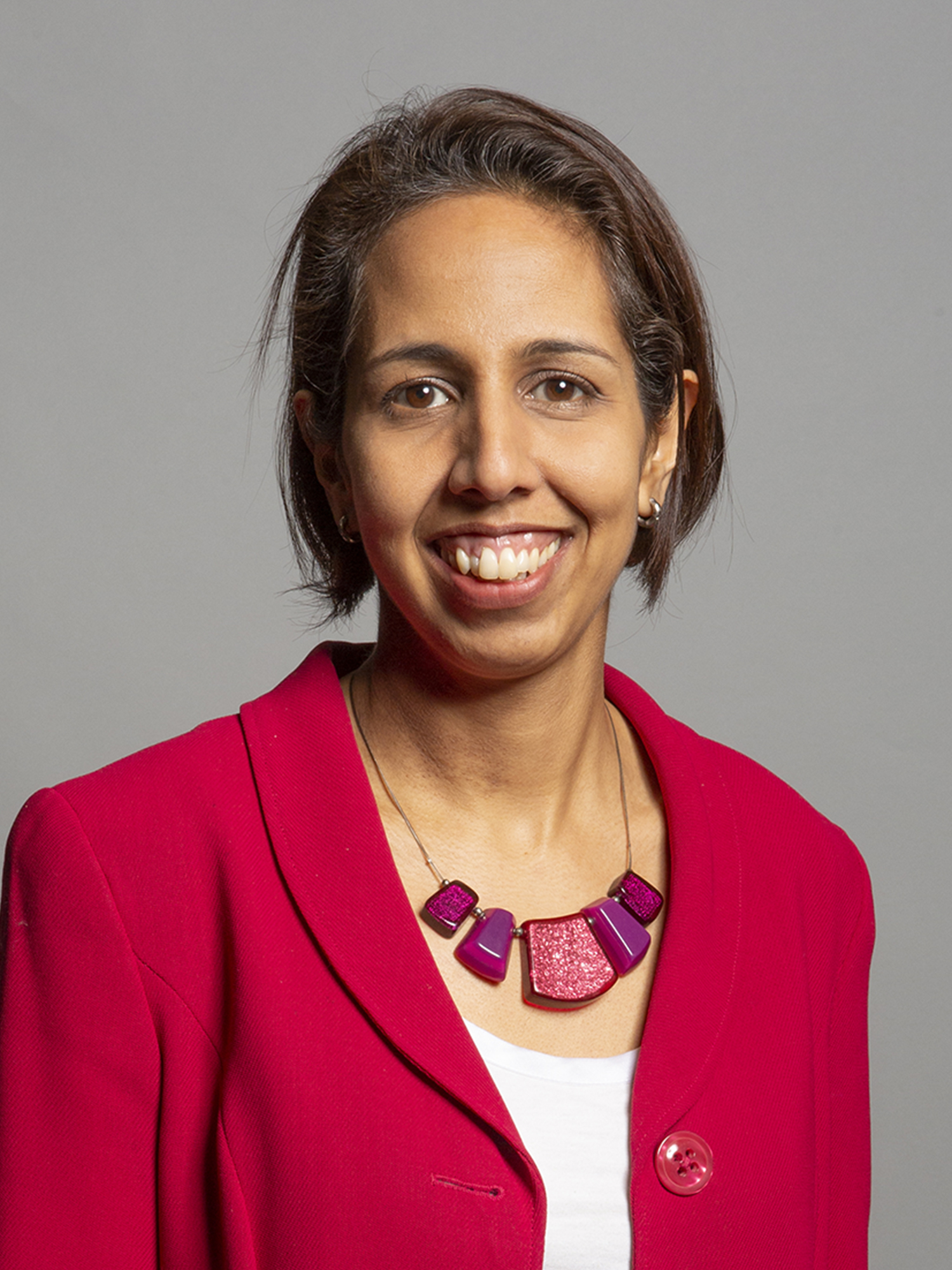
Munira Wilson, MP.

Name	Birth	Death	Career or notability
John Addenbrooke	1680	1719	Founder of Addenbrooke's Hospital
David Armand	1977		Actor, comedian and writer
David Armitage	1965		Professor of History at Harvard University
Herbert Rowse Armstrong	1870	1922	Only English solicitor to be hanged for murder
Richard Ayoade	1977		Performer
Harivansh Rai Bachchan	1907	2003	20th century Indian poet
Nathaniel Bacon	1640	1676	Revolutionary in Virginia
Geoffrey Barnes	1932	2010	Secretary for Security for Hong Kong, Commissioner of Independent Commission Against Corruption
Jonathan Bate	1958		Shakespeare scholar and Provost of Worcester College, Oxford
John Bayliss	1919	2008	Poet
Peter Boizot	1929	2018	Founder of Pizza Express
John Bond	1612	1676	Master of Trinity Hall, Cambridge
Gp. Cpt. Leslie Bonnet	1902	1985	RAF officer, writer and originator of the Welsh Harlequin duck
Sir Arthur Bonsall	1917	2014	Head of GCHQ
John Braddocke	1656	1719	Cleric and theologian
John Bradford	1510	1555	Martyr of the English reformation
Sir Kenneth Bradshaw	1922	2007	Clerk of the House of Commons
Howard Brenton	1942		Playwright
Adam Buddle	1662	1715	After whom the Buddleia is named
Henry William Bunbury	1750	1811	Caricaturist
Francis Cammaerts DSO	1916	2006	Leading member of the French Special Operations Executive
Norman Carey	1934	2017	Founding director of research and development at Celltech
George Corrie	1793	1885	Master of Jesus College, Cambridge
Gervase Cowell	1927	2000	Intelligence Officer
Martin Crimp	1956		Playwright
John Cutts	1661	1707	MP and army commander
Donald Davie	1922	1995	Poet
John Bacchus Dykes	1823	1876	Victorian hymn-writer
Fakhruddin Ali Ahmed	1905	1977	Fifth President of India
Richard Finn	1963	-	Regent of Blackfriars, Oxford
Reg Gadney	1941	2018	Painter and writer
Anil Kumar Gain	1919	1978	Indian mathematician and statistician, FRS
Leo Genn	1905	1978	Actor, nominated for the Academy Award for Best Supporting Actor
Brian Gibson	1944	2004	Movie Director
Maurice Glasman	1961		Political scientist and Labour peer
Charles Wycliffe Goodwin	1817	1878	Egyptologist, bible scholar and judge of the British Supreme Court for China and Japan
Lilian Greenwood	1966		British Labour Party politician
Sir Peter Hall	1930	2017	Theatre and opera director, founder of the RSC
Sir Peter Hall	1932	2014	Urban planner and geographer
Rebecca Hall	1982		Film and stage actress
Leslie Halliwell	1929	1989	Film reviewer
David Harding	1961	-	Hedge fund manager and founder for Winton Capital Management
Roger Harrabin	1955		Journalist and reporter
Joanne Harris	1964		Author
Sir Peter Hirsch	1925	2025	Materials scientist
Sir Robert Howe	1893	1981	Last British Governor-General of the Sudan
Rupert Jeffcoat	1970		Organist Coventry Cathedral
Roger Knight	1946		Cricketer
Emyr Jones Parry	1947		United Nations diplomat
Paul King	1978	-	Director, The Mighty Boosh, Bunny and the Bull
Malcolm Lowry	1909	1957	Writer - Author of Under the Volcano, number 11 on the Modern Library's 100 Best Novels of the 20th century.
Sir Ian McKellen	1939		Actor
Bevil Mabey	1935	2010	Businessman and inventor
Roy MacLaren	1934		Canadian diplomat, politician and author
Nevil Maskelyne	1732	1811	Astronomer Royal; developed the Lunar distance model for measuring latitude
Ian Meakins	1956		Chief Executive of Wolseley plc
Ben Miller	1966		Writer, Actor and Comedian
Morien Morgan	1912	1978	Master of Downing College, Cambridge, known as "the father of Concorde"
Michael Morris	1936		Former Deputy Speaker of the House of Commons
George Nash	1989		Rowing World Champion and Olympic Medalist
Sir Foley Newns	1909	1998	Colonial administrator
Robin Nicholson	1934		Chief Scientific Advisor to the UK Government
Mike Parker	1938		Olympic athlete
Geoffrey Pattie	1936		Former Minister of State for Information and Technology
Jeremy Paxman	1950		Television journalist
Nicholas Penny	1949		Director of the National Gallery
Sam Pickering	1941		Professor of English at the University of Connecticut
Steve Punt	1962		Comedian
Tunku Abdul Rahman	1903	1990	First Prime Minister of Malaysia
John Ray	1627	1705	Naturalist
Sir Mark Rowley	1964		Commissioner of Police of the Metropolis
Sir Thomas Roberts	1658	1706	MP
Jenni Russell	1960		Journalist
Christopher Sargent	1906	1943	Bishop in Fukien, China
Thomas Sherlock	1678	1761	Theologian
James Shirley	1596	1666	Elizabethan poet and playwright
Arun Singh	1944	-	Former Defence Minister of India
Donald Soper	1903	1998	Methodist minister and socialist campaigner
John Strype	1643	1737	Historian
Noel Thompson	1957	-	Television journalist
Sir Tim Waterstone	1939		Founder of Waterstones
Peter Wothers	1969	-	Chemist
William Wotton	1666	1727	Historian
Hannah Yelland	1976		Film & stage actress
Terence Young	1915	1994	British film director - Dr. No, From Russia With Love, Thunderball

== See also ==
- List of Masters of St Catharine's College, Cambridge
- Category: Fellows of St Catharine's College, Cambridge
- List of Honorary Fellows of St Catharine's College, Cambridge
- Organ scholar
- St Catherine's College, Oxford
