= Female genital mutilation in the United Kingdom =

Female genital mutilation in the United Kingdom is the ritual removal of some or all of the external female genitalia of women and girls living in the UK. According to Equality Now and City University London, an estimated 103,000 women and girls aged 15–49 were thought to be living with female genital mutilation (FGM) in England and Wales as of 2011. (Note: Alison Macfarlane and Efua Dorkenoo: "An estimated 103,000 women aged 15–49 with FGM born in countries in which it is practised were living in England and Wales in 2011, compared with the estimated 66,000 in 2001. In addition there were an estimated 24,000 women aged 50 and over with FGM born in FGM practising countries and nearly 10,000 girls aged 0-14 born in FGM practising countries who have undergone or are likely to undergo FGM. Combining the figures for the three age groups, an estimated 137,000 women and girls with FGM, born in countries where FGM is practised, were permanently resident in England and Wales in 2011.)

FGM was outlawed in the UK by the Prohibition of Female Circumcision Act 1985, which made it an offence to perform FGM on children or adults. The Female Genital Mutilation Act 2003 and the Prohibition of Female Genital Mutilation (Scotland) Act 2005 made it an offence to arrange FGM outside the country for British citizens or permanent residents, whether or not it is lawful in the country to which the girl is taken. (Note: Female Genital Mutilation Act 2003: "A person is guilty of an offence if he excises, infibulates or otherwise mutilates the whole or any part of a girl's labia majora, labia minora or clitoris," unless "necessary for her physical or mental health." Although the legislation refers to girls, it applies to women too.) The penalty is up to 14 years in jail.

The first prosecutions for FGM took place in 2015 against a doctor accused of performing FGM and another man accused of aiding and abetting; both were found not guilty. The first successful conviction was secured in February 2019.

== History ==
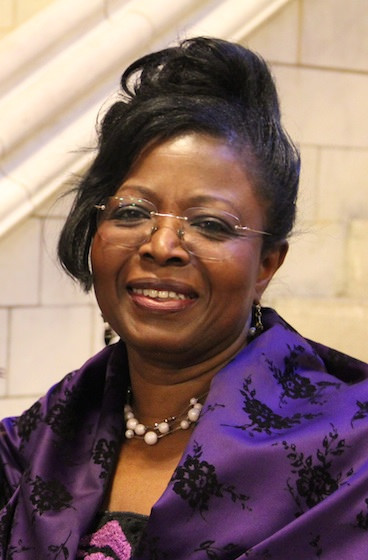
Efua Dorkenoo (1949–2014)

The diaspora communities in the UK thought to be at high risk of FGM include those from Eritrea, Ethiopia, Nigeria, Somalia and Sudan. The largest is the Somalia diaspora, with nearly 42,000 women and girls in the UK believed to be affected as of 2011. FGM has a high prevalence in several of these countries, including the most severe form, FGM Type III. Girls from communities in which FGM is commonplace are often taken to their countries of origin during the school summer holidays in order to undergo the procedure. This period of the year is known as the "cutting season".

In 1983 Efua Dorkenoo, author of Cutting the Rose (1994), founded the Foundation for Women's Health, Research and Development (FORWARD), a British NGO that supports women who have experienced FGM and tries to eliminate the practice. Dorkenoo received an OBE in 1994 for her work. Two years after she founded FORWARD, the Prohibition of Female Circumcision Act 1985 made it an offence in the UK to perform FGM on children or adults.

In 1993 a councillor at the London Borough of Brent proposed a motion that FGM should be legalised and made available on the National Health Service. According to Ann John, a councillor who opposed the motion, the motion called for it to be classed as a "right specifically for African families who want to carry on their tradition whilst living in this country". John said she suffered verbal attacks, including threats that she herself would be mutilated; interviewed in 2014, she said she believed her treatment had deterred people for years from opposing FGM in case they were accused of racism. The motion was defeated.

In 1997 specialist midwife Comfort Momoh set up the African Well Women's Clinic in London to help women affected by FGM. Momoh was awarded an MBE in 2008 for services to women's healthcare.

=== Local authority areas with highest FGM prevalence April 2015-March 2016 ===
Per the City University study:

Borough	Newly recorded	Borough	Total attendances
Birmingham	435	Brent	1250
Bristol	385	Bristol	705
Brent	325	Birmingham	520
Manchester	310	Harrow	460
Southwark	290	Ealing	355
Enfield	215	Manchester	350
Ealing	175	Southwark	320
Lambeth	175	Enfield	265
Sheffield	165	Lambeth	200
Camden	140	Sheffield	185
Greenwich	130	Camden	175
Leeds	125	Hillingdon	175

== 2000s–2010s ==
The number of women aged 15–49 resident in England and Wales born in FGM practising regions having migrated to the UK was 182000 in 2001 and increased to 283000 in 2011. The number of women born in the Horn of Africa, where FGM is nearly universal and the most severe types of FGM, infibulation, is commonly practised, increased from 22000 in 2001 to 56000 in 2011, an increase of 34000. The number of women of all ages having undergone FGM rituals was estimated to be 137000 in 2011. The number of women of ages 15–49 having undergone FGM rituals was estimated to 66000 in 2001 and there was an increase to 103000 in 2011.

=== Overview ===
Prevalence among the 15–49 age group in the 29 countries in which FGM is thought to be most prevalent (UNICEF, November 2014)

In 2007 the FGM National Clinical Group was created to train health professionals in how to deal with the practice. Concern about FGM in the UK increased significantly in the mid-2010s. In November 2013 a coalition of Royal Colleges, trade unions and Equality Now produced a report, "Tackling FGM in the UK."

Britain's first specialist clinic for child victims of FGM opened in London in 2014. Since April that year all NHS hospitals have recorded whether a patient has undergone FGM or has a family history of it, and all acute hospitals are obliged to report this data to the Department of Health on a monthly basis. According to the first official figures published on the numbers of FGM cases seen by hospitals in England, over 1,700 women and girls who have undergone FGM were treated by the NHS between April and October 2014.

A 17-year-old student from Bristol, Fahma Mohamed, created with support from The Guardian an online petition on 6 February 2014 with Change.org, on the International Day of Zero Tolerance to Female Genital Mutilation. The petition asked Michael Gove, then education secretary, to write to primary and secondary schools, encouraging them to be alert to FGM. The petition was one of the fastest growing UK petitions on Change.org, with 230,000 supporters. Gove met Mohamed and members of the youth group Integrate Bristol, who have played a key role in raising awareness of FGM. He sent a letter to all headteachers in England informing them of new guidelines on children's safety, including guidance on FGM. This marked the first time the guidelines included mention of FGM.

The city with the highest prevalence of FGM in 2015 was London, at a rate of 28.2 per 1000 women aged 15–49, by far the highest. The borough with the highest rate was Southwark, at 57.5 per 1000 women, while mainly rural areas of the UK had prevalence rate below 1 per 1000.

In 2015 police acquired the UK’s first FGM protection order. This was acquired under a new law, the Serious Crime Act 2015, which allows such protection orders. It also allows the combating of FGM by judges remanding people in custody, ordering mandatory medical checks, and instructing girls believed to be at risk of FGM to live at a certain address so authorities can see whether they have been mutilated.

On 12 September 2016 Nottingham became the first City of Zero Tolerance towards FGM.

In the April 2016 - March 2017 period the NHS attended to 9,179 cases in which FGM was either identified, treatment was given, or a woman with FGM had given birth, a slight drop on the previous year's figures. Only 26% of the victims reported where the crime had taken place, but of those who did, 1,229 cases had taken place in Africa and 57 in the UK.

=== First prosecutions ===
As of 2015 there had been no convictions in the UK for performing or arranging FGM. By contrast, in France over 100 parents and two practitioners had been prosecuted by 2014 in over 40 criminal cases. The United Nations Committee on the Elimination of Discrimination against Women expressed concern in July 2013 that there had been no FGM-related convictions in the UK. The committee asked the government to "ensure the full implementation of its legislation on FGM."

The first charges were announced in March 2014 against a doctor, accused of having performed FGM on a woman from Somalia who had just given birth at the Whittington Hospital in north London. Another man was charged with aiding and abetting in the same case. During the trial in January 2015 the doctor said he had performed a single figure-of-eight stitch to stem bleeding following the birth. Both men were found not guilty on 4 February 2015.

A doctor in Birmingham, Ali Mao-Aweys, was struck off the medical register in 2014 after discussing how to arrange FGM with an undercover journalist in 2012.

The first successful conviction was that of a Ugandan mother who was found guilty at the Central Criminal Court of England and Wales on 1 February 2019. On 8 March 2019, she was sentenced to 11 years in prison. The first conviction for conspiracy to commit FGM occurred in 2024, when Emad Kaky was found guilty at Nottingham Crown Court after a two-week trial.

=== Delays in investigations ===
In September 2017, it was reported that some children had spent months on protection plans or in foster care whilst they waited to be examined to determine whether they had been victims of FGM, with those examinations demonstrating that the suspicions were false. Research by University College Hospital in 2016 found the waiting time to be almost two months, with some girls having had to wait more than a year. The hospital confirmed that this remained an issue as of September 2017. Anti-FGM charity Forward argued that the handling of cases was leaving some girls and their families traumatised.

=== National Curriculum changes ===
In February 2019, the Observer reported that the UK government was to change the National Curriculum to include relationship education for primary age pupils and health education for pupils of all ages. Secondary aged pupils would be taught about grooming, forced marriage and domestic abuse. It requires that secondary schools to address the physical and emotional damage caused by FGM, the support available and ensure that pupils know FGM is illegal.

=== Family Court ===
The Children Act 1989 (Amendment) (Female Genital Mutilation) Act 2019 meant that all FGM cases in England and Wales go through family courts.

== See also ==
- Prevalence of female genital mutilation by country
- Daughters of Eve
