= Naana Otoo-Oyortey =

Ghanaian social activist

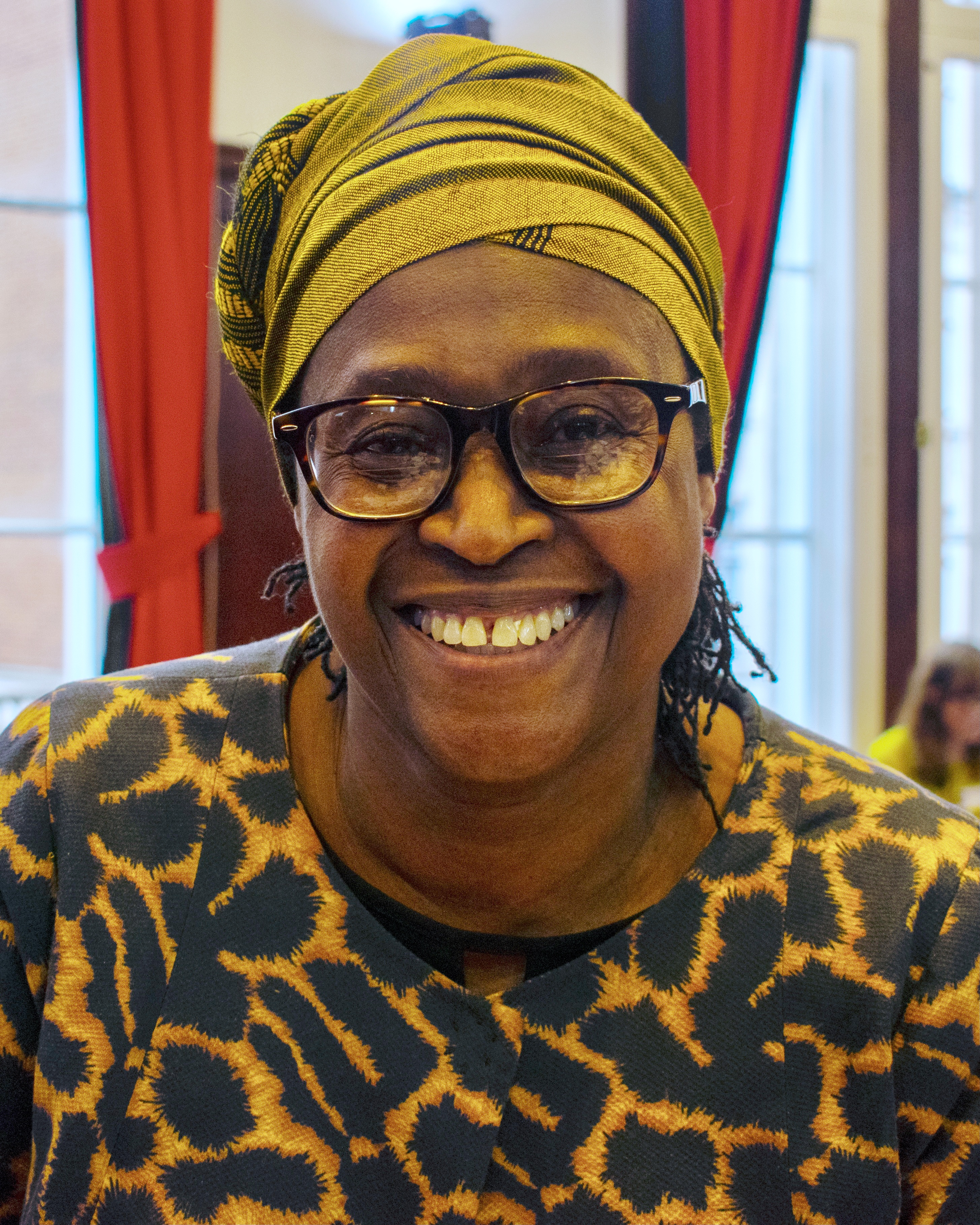
- in 2019
- Education: University of Sussex
- Employer(s): International Planned Parenthood Federation; Foundation for Women's Health, Research and Development
- Known for: Activism, campaigning against FGM

Naana Otoo-Oyortey is a Ghanaian social activist, the executive director of the Foundation for Women's Health, Research and Development.

== Early life and education ==
Otoo-Oyortey was born in Ghana. She completed a master's of philosophy at the University of Sussex. She was a member of the Institute of Development Studies, where she worked on gender issues in Ghana.

== Career ==
Otoo-Oyortey worked at the International Planned Parenthood Federation, where she investigated child marriage and poverty. She believes that to achieve gender equality the world must address violence against women and the socio-cultural norms that accept this behaviour. She is concerned that domestic violence results in women not protecting themselves from sexually transmitted infections.

Otoo-Oyortey joined the African Diaspora women-led nonprofit Foundation for Women's Health, Research and Development (FORWARD) in 1998, invited by the founder, Efua Dorkenoo. FORWARD is the lead agency working to end female genital mutilation (FGM) in the UK. She is now executive director of the organization, and has led training initiatives for in Swahili and English for girls to become innovators against gender-based violence. With FORWARD Otoo-Oyortey has conducted an ethnographic study into the experiences of people affected by FGM. In 2009 Otoo-Oyortey was honoured in the 2008 Birthday Honours for "services to Human Rights Issues for Women".

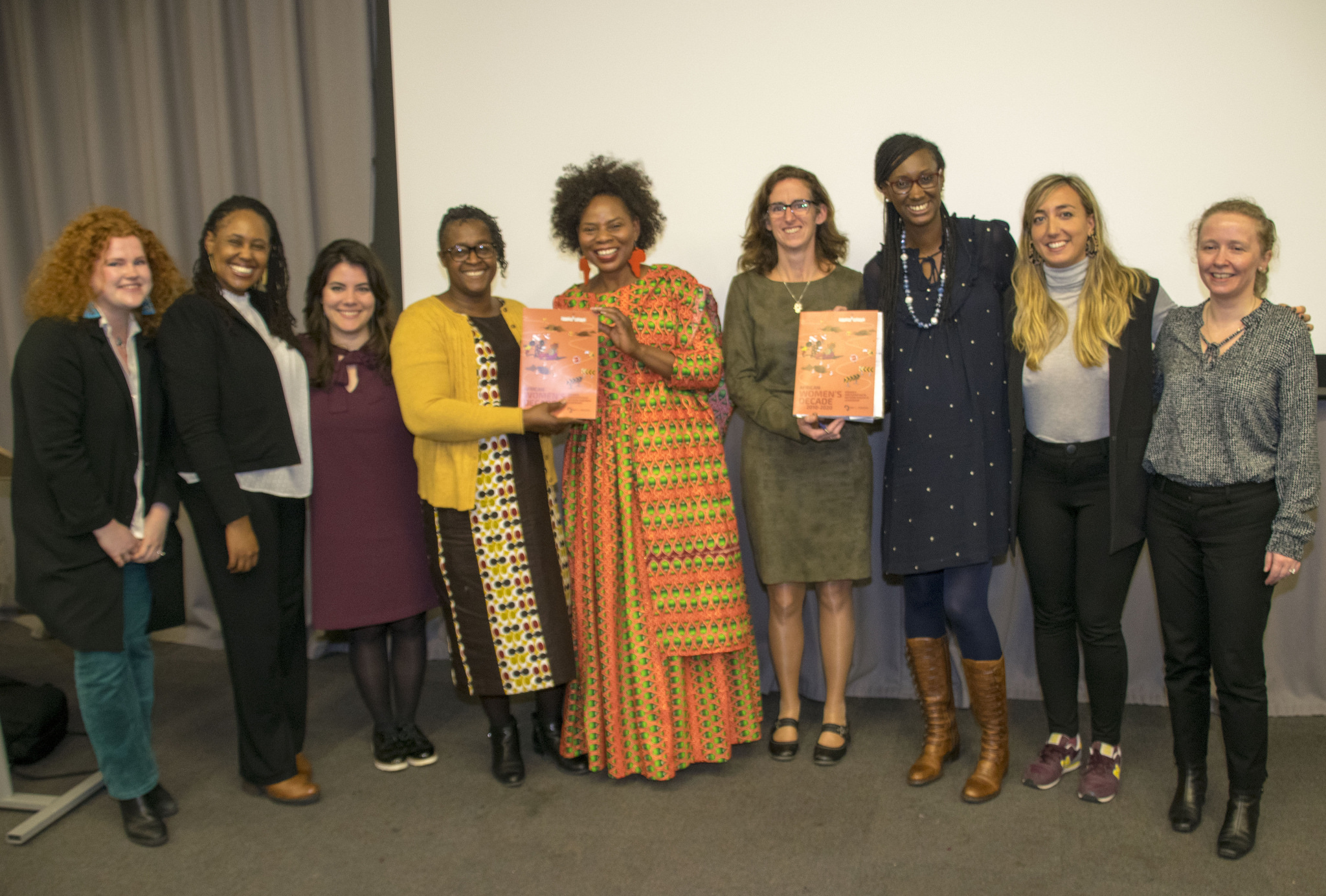
Launch of the annual report of Women's Participation in Decision-Making & Leadership decade. With Justina Mutale, Rainatou Sow, Naana Otoo-Oyortey and Dr Anouka van Eerdewijk

In 2014 Otoo-Oyortey gave a TEDx talk about women's rights and FGM. That year she was included in the Evening Standard's list of London's most influential people. She was part of the London Girl Summit in 2014, inviting two young African campaigners who are fighting to end child marriage in Ethiopia and Tanzania. She joined the UCLH to open the FGM paediatric clinic. In 2016 FORWARD was part of an end FGM march in Bristol, which Otoo-Oyortey described as a "quiet revolution".

She has discussed her campaigning on Woman's Hour and at the International Observatory of Human Rights. She is the President of the Board of the European End FGM Network and on the Board of Trustees of ACORD.
