= Children Act 1989 (Amendment) (Female Genital Mutilation) Act 2019 =

Act of the Parliament of the United Kingdom

Children Act 1989 (Amendment) (Female Genital Mutilation) Act 2019 (Note: Section 2(3).)
- Act of Parliament
- Parliament of the United Kingdom
- Long title: An Act to amend the Children Act 1989 to provide that certain proceedings under Part 1 of Schedule 2 to the Female Genital Mutilation Act 2003 are family proceedings.
- Citation: 2019 c. 10
- Introduced by: Zac Goldsmith (Commons); Lord Berkeley of Knighton (Lords)
- Territorial extent: England and Wales (Note: Section 2(1).)

Dates
- Royal assent: 15 March 2019
- Commencement: 15 March 2019 (Note: Section 2(2).)
Other legislation
Amends	Children Act 1989
Relates to	Female Genital Mutilation Act 2003; Serious Crime Act 2015

Status: Current legislation

History of passage through Parliament

Text of statute as originally enacted

Revised text of statute as amended

The Children Act 1989 (Amendment) (Female Genital Mutilation) Act 2019 (c. 10) is an act of the Parliament of the United Kingdom which amends the Children Act 1989 to change the designation of proceedings under the Female Genital Mutilation Act 2003 as "family proceedings".

== Passage ==
Zac Goldsmith, in the second reading debate in the House of Commons, stated in relation to female genital mutilation (FGM) court proceedings, "that is clearly an omission in the law, and it means that our courts do not have the full suite of powers necessary to protect girls who are at risk."

The House of Commons Library notes that FGM has been illegal since 1985. The first successful prosecution of female genital mutilation occurred in February 2019, during the passage of the 2019 act.

Keith Vaz, then the Chair of the Home Affairs Select Committee, "It is shocking that 28 years on from female genital mutilation first being made a criminal offence, there has not yet been a successful prosecution in the UK. The Committee's inquiry will seek to find out why this is the case, as well as considering what more needs to be done to protect at risk girls."

== Provisions ==
This act enables family courts to issue interim care orders to protect girls at risk of offences female genital mutilation.

== See also ==
- Female genital mutilation in the United Kingdom
- Female Genital Mutilation Act 2003
