= Foundation for Women's Health, Research and Development =

British charity

The Foundation for Women's Health, Research and Development (FORWARD) is a British NGO, founded in 1983 by Efua Dorkenoo, that supports women who have experienced female genital mutilation (FGM) and tries to eliminate the practice.

== History ==
FORWARD evolved from the Women's Action Group for Female Excision and Infibulation (WAGFEI), which comprised UK-based women concerned about FGM. Efua Dorkenoo coordinated the group between 1981 and 1983 under the auspices of the Minority Rights Group (MRG), and travelled to gather facts about FGM from various countries in Africa to compile into an MRG report on the practice.

The organization runs several programmes in the UK and in East and West Africa. According to FORWARD, there are around 100,000 women in the UK who have experienced FGM. The executive director is Naana Otoo-Oyortey.

== See also ==
- Comfort Momoh
- FGM in the UK
- My Body My Rules, a short film about female genital mutilation, developed by FORWARD
