= Rainatou Sow =

Guinean woman

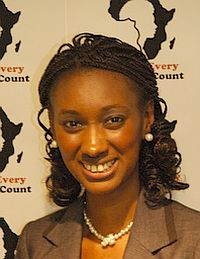
- Born: Fria, Guinea
- Education: London Metropolitan University
- Known for: Women's rights
- Website: http://www.makeeverywomancount.org/

Rainatou Sow is a Guinean woman who founded 'Make Every Woman Count': an organisation operated by a team of young women in Africa, America and Europe who use their passion and experience to promote rights and empowerment of women and girls. She is a campaigner for a peaceful and equitable world, a human rights and social justice advocate, and works to empower women and girls.

== Personal life and background ==
Rainatou was born in the mining town of Fria. At the age of 12 she began teaching evening classes to girls unable to go to school, and later engaged with the political system, becoming a member of the Guinean children's parliament as minister for children and Women's affairs, including appearances on Guinean radio and television.

Rainatou gained a Master's degree in International Law at l'Université Kofi Annan de Guinée, and a Master's degree in International Relations at London Metropolitan University. She is fluent in French, English, Pulaar and Susu.

== Early political activities ==
Rainatou held several positions in Guinea, including with the International Organization for Migration (IOM), World Health Organization and UNICEF. After moving to New York in 2009, Rainatou took an internship at the WILPF Peacewomen Project, working exclusively on United Nations Security Council Resolution 1325: a resolution adopted in 2000 calling for women's rights to be respected in conflict.

== Foundation of Make Every Woman Count ==
Inspired by the activities at Peacewoman, and motivated by the African Union naming 2010-2020 "The African Women's Decade", Rainatou founded a new organisation to provide news and resources for African Women, both those in Africa and those living abroad in the Diaspora. Aimed at promoting the theme for the African Women's Decade, this online resource centre began collating news events from across the continent, and providing self-published articles highlighting the work of grassroots organisations, together with interviews with successful women.

On returning to the United Kingdom in 2011, Rainatou applied for Make Every Woman Count to become a registered charity, a status it achieved on 13 October that year. Since founding the organisation, Rainatou has expanded the team to include a diverse range of volunteers from around the world.

== Beliefs and inspirations ==
Talking to CNN, Rainatou gave the reasons for her dedication to the African Women's Decade: "Basically, when they launched African Women's Decade it was in Nairobi; you had people from all over [the world] coming, delegates, African governments, it was a big feast. But then after a few months you hardly heard about it - because of the credit crunch basically we didn't hear about financing going into women's projects there and it was really calm. So we thought what can we do? Are we going to sit down and let this decade pass away, or are we going to do something, mainly us as the younger generation".

She was motivated by her vision that one day all women will have voice in governance institutions and fully participate equally in public dialogue and decision making. In her interview with Women 4 Africa she said: "Most International organizations focused on empowering and gaining the equal rights of women often neglect the voices of African women themselves".

== Recognition and awards ==
Rainatou was awarded 'Inspirational Women of the Year' in 2012 by Women for Africa, in recognition of her work promoting the African Women's Decade, and was featured in the '20 Youngest Power Women in Africa' by Forbes Magazine. She was recognized in 2013 by THE BUZZ in the Equality for all among the 'Eight Foreign Women's Equality Activists To Know' In 2013 and in 2014, she was recognized as one of the BBC's 100 women.

== Media appearances ==
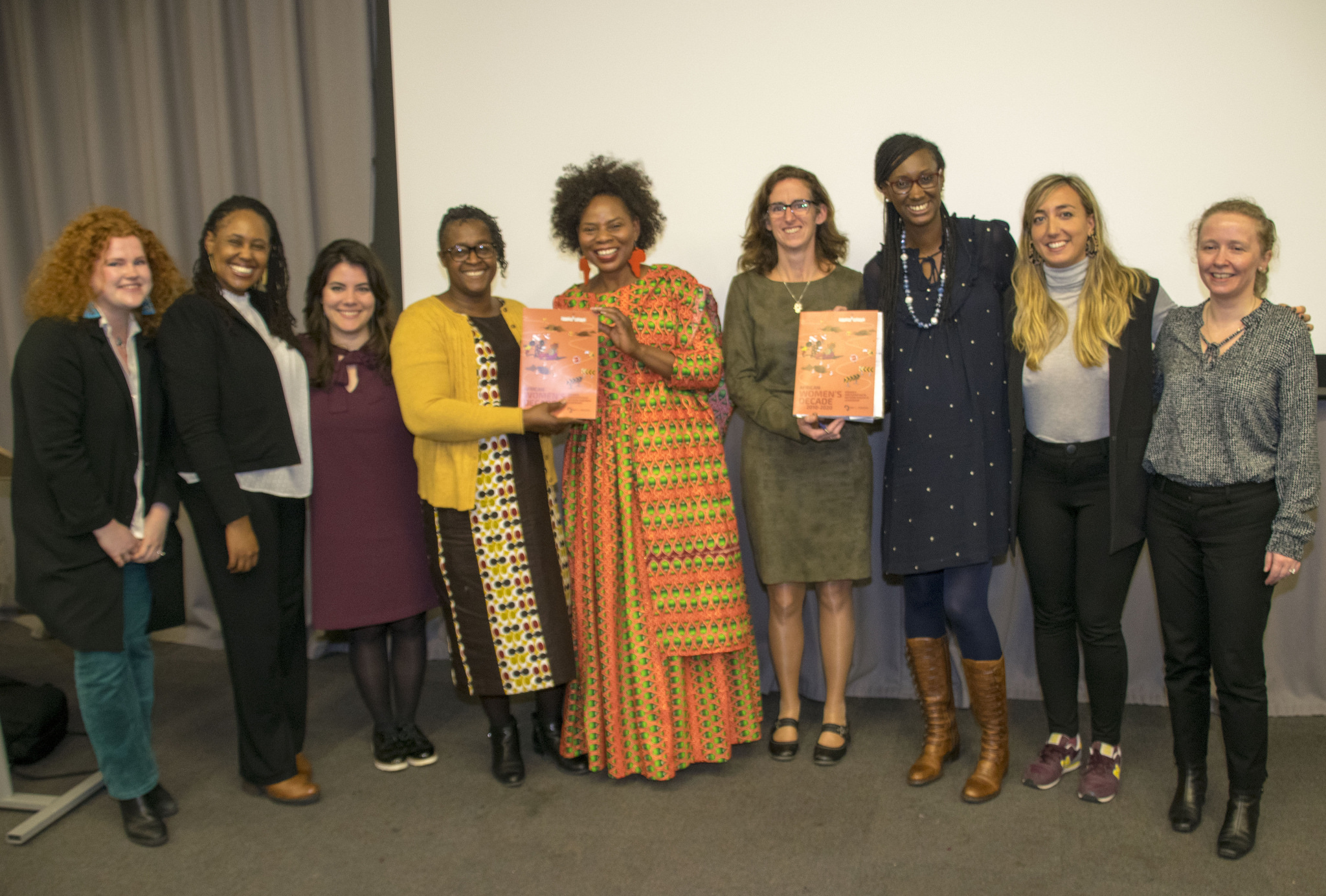
UK Launch of the 2018 report of Women's Participation in Decision-Making & Leadership decade. With Justina Mutale, Rainatou Sow, Naana Otoo-Oyortey and Dr Anouka van Eerdewijk

Rainatou has appeared on CNN's African Voices show, being interviewed at the publication event for the organisation's annual report. She was one of the participants in 100 Women (BBC) on 25 October 2013, a day of discussion including 100 women from around the world, and again on 26 October 2014.
