= Mutuals' Deferred Shares Act 2015 =

Act of the Parliament of the United Kingdom

Mutuals' Deferred Shares Act 2015 (Note: Section 4(1).)
- Act of Parliament
- Parliament of the United Kingdom
- Long title: An Act to enable the law relating to societies registered and incorporated under the Friendly Societies Act 1992 and certain mutual insurers to be amended to permit or facilitate the issue of deferred shares; and to restrict the voting rights of members who hold such shares.
- Citation: 2015 c. 13
- Territorial extent: United Kingdom (Note: Section 4(3).)

Dates
- Royal assent: 26 March 2015
- Commencement: Not yet in force (Note: Section 4(2).)
Other legislation
Amended by	Corporate Insolvency and Governance Act 2020
Relates to	Friendly Societies Act 1992

Status: Amended

History of passage through Parliament

Text of statute as originally enacted

Revised text of statute as amended

The Mutuals' Deferred Shares Act 2015 (c. 13) is an act of the Parliament of the United Kingdom.

== Legislative passage ==
The legislation was passed as a private member's bill.

== Provisions ==
The act allows financial services mutuals to issue deferred shares.

The act ensures that:

- these shares are permanent
- there shares confer membership on holders
- institutional investors are enabled to become members of these firms
- a member cannot have more than one vote as a result of holding the shares
- investing members that did not trade with the business are excluded from any membership votes related to mergers or dissolution

== Implementation ==
The act remains unusable, because it was not commenced, because of concerns raised by HM Revenue and Customs.

== See also ==
- Co-operatives and Community Benefit Societies Act 2003
