= Specialist Printing Equipment and Materials (Offences) Act 2015 =

- Act of Parliament
- Parliament of the United Kingdom
- Long title: Make provision for an offence in respect of supplies of specialist printing equipment and related materials; and for connected purposes.
- Citation: 2015 c. 16
- Introduced by: David Amess MP (Commons); Baroness Berridge (Lords)
- Territorial extent: England and Wales

Dates
- Royal assent: 26 March 2015
- Commencement: 26 May 2015

Status: Current legislation

Text of statute as originally enacted

Revised text of statute as amended

The Specialist Printing Equipment and Materials (Offences) Act 2015 (c. 16) is an act of the Parliament of the United Kingdom with the goal of curbing forgery and fraud.

== Legislative passage ==
It was introduced as a private member's bill by David Amess and Baroness Berridge.

== Provisions ==
The act makes a specific offence of knowingly supplying printing equipment for the production of fake or fraudulent identity documents.

The provisions of the act include:

- Making it an offence to supply specialist printing equipment in the knowledge that it is to be used for fraudulent or criminal purposes.

- A person found guilty of this is liable of a prison term of up to 10 years, a fine or both.

- Defining 'specialist printing equipment' as any equipment which is designed, adapted for or otherwise capable of being used for the making of relevant documents or any material or article that is used in the making of such documents).
- Defining 'relevant documents' as anything that is or purports to be:

(a) an identity document (defined as any document that gives a person the right to reside or remain within the UK, a registration card [as defined in the Immigration Act 1971], a United Kingdom passport [as defined in the Immigration Act 1971], a passport from another country or issued by another international entity or a document that can be used instead of a passport)

(b) a travel document (defined as a licence to drive a motor vehicle granted under the Road Traffic Act 1988 or the Road Traffic (Northern Ireland) Order 1981, a driving licence from another country or issued by another international entity, a ticket or document authorising travel on public passenger transport services, a permit authorising a concession when travelling on public transport, a badge of a form prescribed under the Chronically Sick and Disabled Persons Act 1970)

(c) an entry document (defined as a security pass or other document used as such or a ticket, or other document used in that capacity, to an event)

(d) a document used for verifying the holder's age or national insurance number

(e) a currency note or protected coin, as defined in the Forgery and Counterfeiting Act 1981

(f) a debit or credit card

(g) any other instrument to which Section 5 of the Forgery and Counterfeiting Act 1981 applies

- Ensuring the act applies to those in the employ or public service of the Crown as it does to other individuals.

== Reception ==
The legislation was supported by the government and the opposition.
