= Social Action, Responsibility and Heroism Act 2015 =

Act of the Parliament of the United Kingdom

Social Action, Responsibility and Heroism Act 2015 (Note: Section 5(5).)
- Act of Parliament
- Parliament of the United Kingdom
- Long title: An Act to make provision as to matters to which a court must have regard in determining a claim in negligence or breach of statutory duty.
- Citation: 2015 c. 3
- Introduced by: Chris Grayling (Commons); Lord Faulks (Lords)
- Territorial extent: England and Wales (Note: Section 5(1).)

Dates
- Royal assent: 12 February 2015
- Commencement: 12 February 2015 (section 5); 13 April 2015; (Note: Section 5(2)–(4). The Social Action, Responsibility and Heroism Act 2015 (Commencement and Transitional Provision) Regulations 2015 (SI 2015/808).)

Status: Current legislation

History of passage through Parliament

Text of statute as originally enacted

Revised text of statute as amended

The Social Action, Responsibility and Heroism Act 2015 (Note: Sometimes abbreviated as SARAH or Sarah. Not to be confused with Sarah's Law.) (c. 3) is an act of the Parliament of the United Kingdom.

The Social Action, Responsibility and Heroism Bill was introduced to the House of Commons as a government bill by the Secretary of State for Justice, Chris Grayling on 12 June 2014, and given royal assent on 12 February 2015, coming into force as the Social Action, Responsibility and Heroism Act 2015 on 13 April 2015.

== Background ==
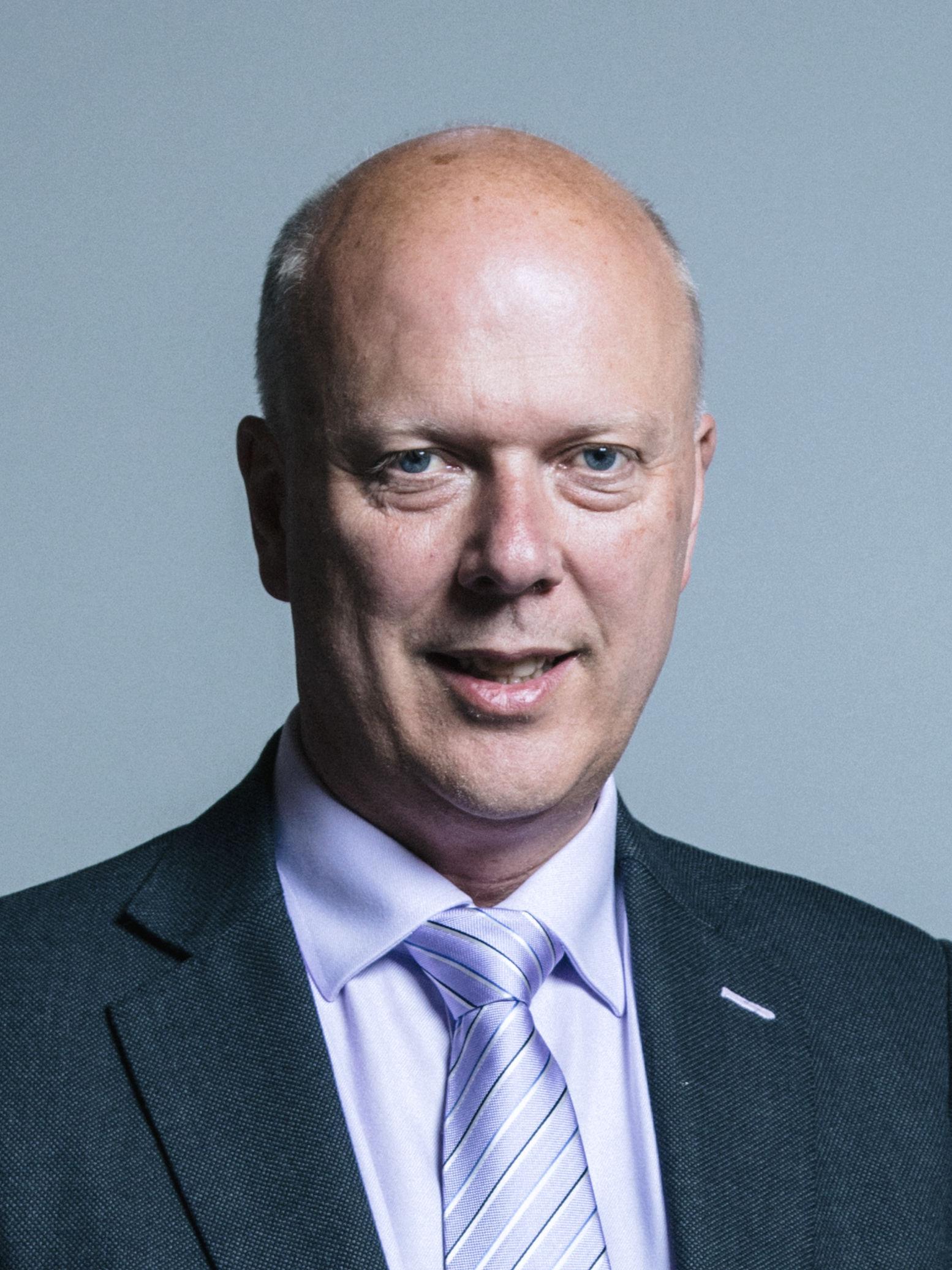
Chris Grayling in June 2017

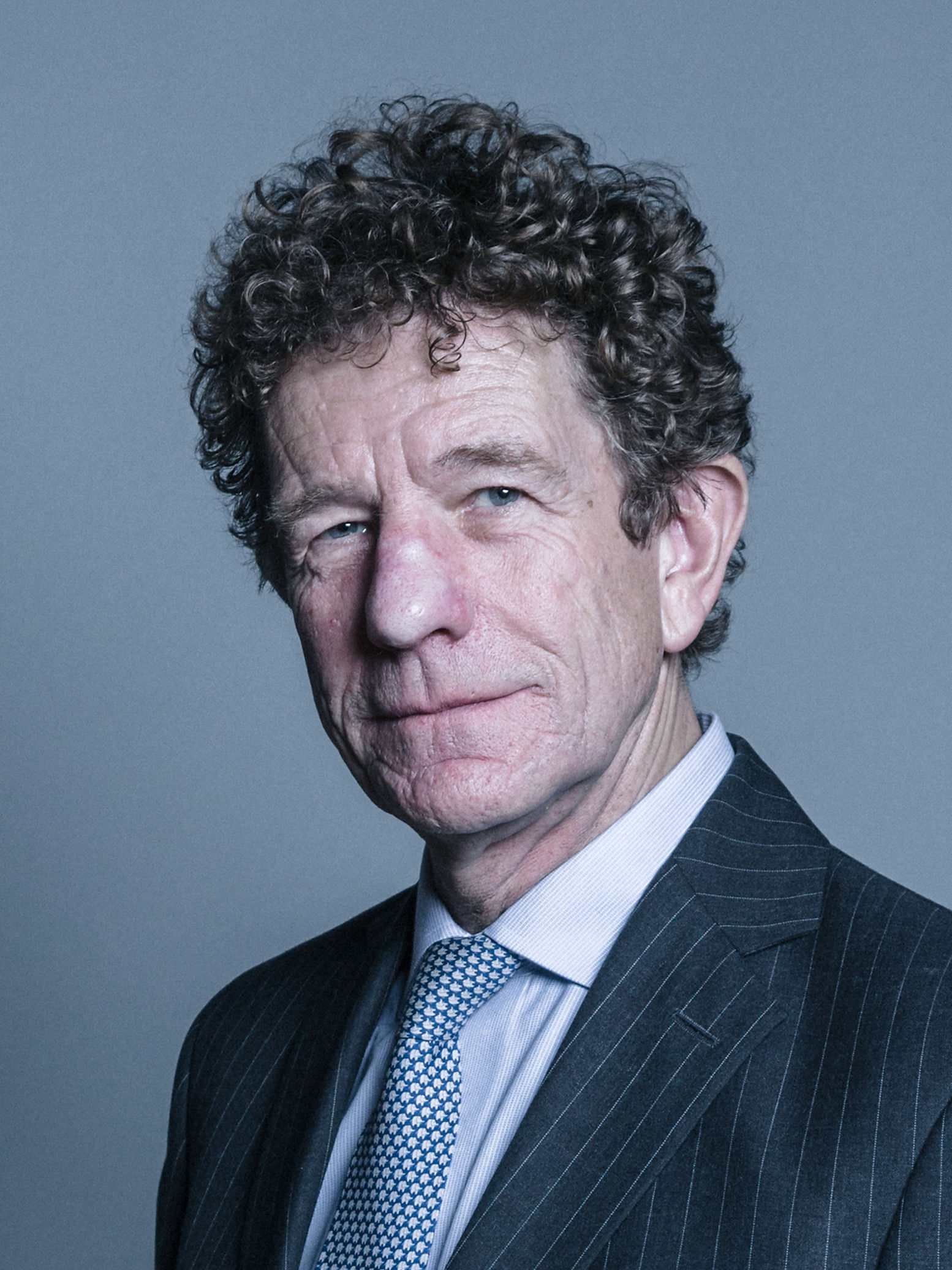
Lord Faulks in March 2018

The 2010 Conservative–Liberal Democrat coalition agreement contained a commitment to "take a range of measures to encourage volunteering and involvement in social action".

The Social Action, Responsibility and Heroism Bill was introduced to the House of Commons as a Government bill by the Secretary of State for Justice, Chris Grayling on 12 June 2014. The Bill was noted for its brevity, at just over 300 words. The Bill was introduced to the House of Lords by the Minister of State for Justice, Lord Faulks, on 21 October 2014, where the criticism of Lord Pannick was noted for its intensity. The act was given royal assent on 12 February 2015, and came into force on 13 April 2015.

== Provisions ==
The act extends only to England and Wales.

== Commentary ==
=== Necessity ===
The opposition Labour Party described the bill as a "vacuous waste of time". Lord Pannick called it "the most ridiculous piece of legislation approved by Parliament in a very long time".

As of May 2020, there were no reported cases of the provisions within the Act having been applied.

In 2025, the act was referenced in a Hetherington v Fell & Anor [2025] EWHC 1487 (KB) (16 June 2025) around the liability for a collision between a car and a bicycle during a cycling event.

The court held that the cycling club organising the event was "acting for the benefit of members of society" and therefore "the standard of care to be applied when exercising the duty of care during the risk assessments [by the club] was that of a reasonably competent and reasonably informed volunteer".

== Bibliography ==
- Goudkamp, James (2 January 2018). "Restating the common law? The Social Action, Responsibility and Heroism Act 2015". Legal Studies. 37 (4). Cambridge University Press for The Society of Legal Scholars: 577–598. doi:10.1111/lest.12158. S2CID 152231144.
- Mulheron, Rachel (5 January 2017). "Legislating Dangerously: Bad Samaritans, Good Society, and the Heroism Act 2015". The Modern Law Review. 80 (1): 88–109. doi:10.1111/1468-2230.12243. eISSN 1468-2230. ISSN 0026-7961. S2CID 151833432.
