= Prohibition of Female Circumcision Act 1985 =

Act of the Parliament of the United Kingdom criminalising female genital mutilation

Prohibition of Female Circumcision Act 1985 (Note: Section 4(1).)
- Act of Parliament
- Parliament of the United Kingdom
- Long title: An Act to prohibit female circumcision.
- Citation: 1985 c. 38
- Introduced by: Lord Kennet, Dame Marion Roe.
- Territorial extent: England and Wales; Scotland; Northern Ireland; (Note: Section 4(3).)

Dates
- Royal assent: 16 July 1985
- Commencement: 16 September 1985 (Note: Section 4(2).)
- Repealed: England and Wales and Northern Ireland: 3 March 2004 (Note: The Female Genital Mutilation Act 2003 (Commencement) Order 2004 (SI 2004/286).); Scotland: 1 September 2005
Other legislation
Amended by	Extradition Act 1989; Statute Law (Repeals) Act 1993
Repealed by	England and Wales and Northern Ireland: Female Genital Mutilation Act 2003; Scotland:Prohibition of Female Genital Mutilation (Scotland) Act 2005

Status: Repealed

Text of statute as originally enacted

Revised text of statute as amended

The Prohibition of Female Circumcision Act 1985 (c. 38) was an act of the Parliament of the United Kingdom. It made female genital mutilation a crime throughout the UK, allowing for sentences of up to five years' imprisonment. It was first introduced to the House of Lords by Wayland Young, 2nd Baron Kennet in 1983, but the Bill did not progress to the House of Commmons.

Two years later, Dame Marion Roe MP introduced a private member's bill to prohibit female genital mutilation. With cross-party support, Roe's Bill gained royal assent on 16 July 1985.

No one was ever successfully prosecuted under the act, but a medical practitioner was stricken from the Medical Register in 1993 for having performed the procedure. The act was replaced by the Female Genital Mutilation Act 2003 in England, Wales and Northern Ireland, and the Prohibition of Female Genital Mutilation (Scotland) Act 2005 in Scotland, both of which extend the legislation to cover acts committed by UK nationals outside of the UK's borders, so that it became a crime to take a girl abroad to undergo FGM.

== See also ==
- Female genital mutilation in the United Kingdom
