= Jake Berry =

British politician (born 1978)

The Right Honourable Sir Jake Berry
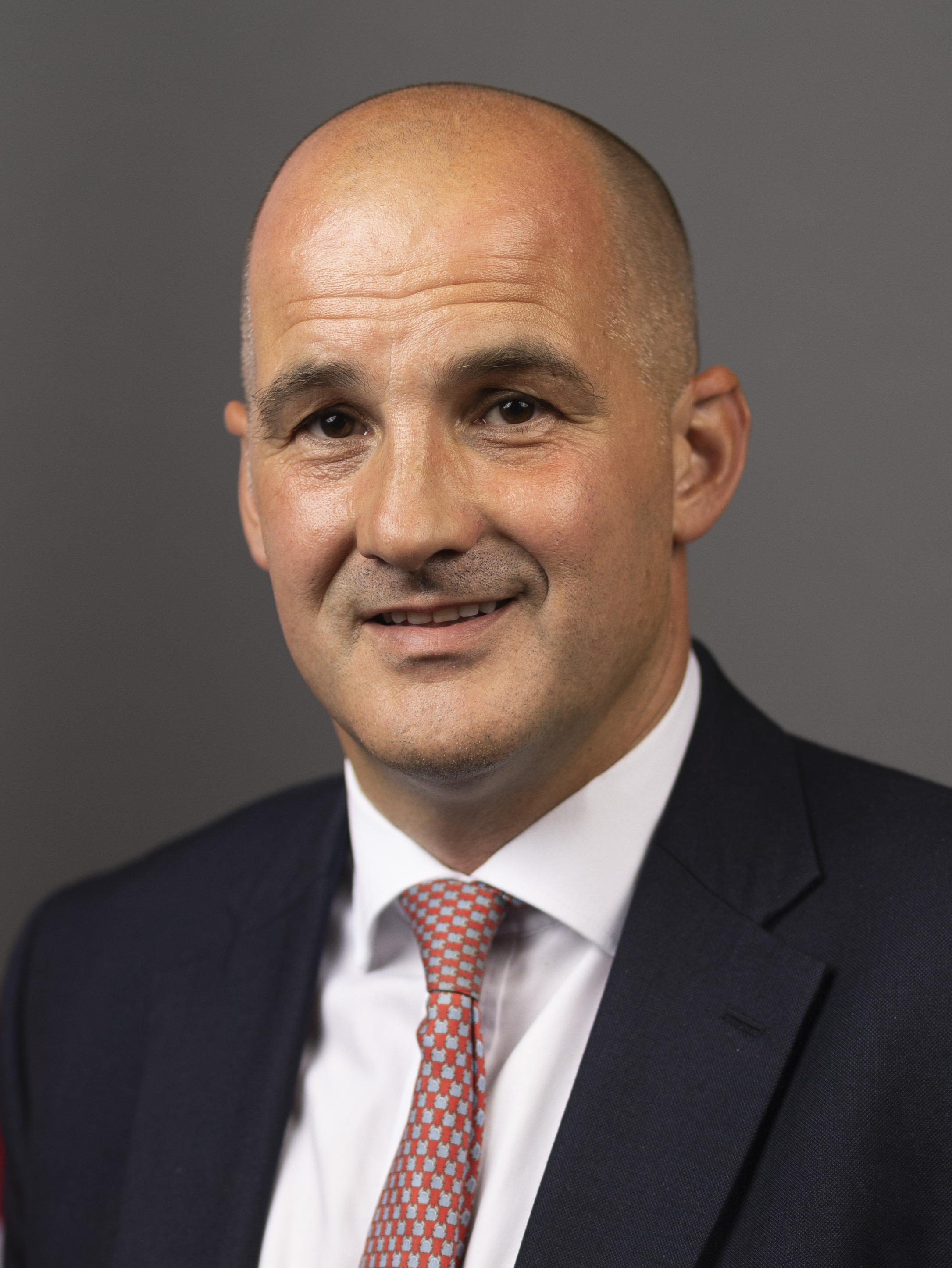
- Official portrait, 2022

Chairman of the Conservative Party
- In office 6 September 2022 – 25 October 2022
- Leader: Liz Truss
- Preceded by: Andrew Stephenson and Ben Elliot
- Succeeded by: Nadhim Zahawi

Minister without Portfolio
- In office 6 September 2022 – 25 October 2022
- Prime Minister: Liz Truss
- Preceded by: Andrew Stephenson
- Succeeded by: Nadhim Zahawi

Minister of State for the Northern Powerhouse and Local Growth (Note: As Parliamentary Under-Secretary of State from 2017 to July 2019.)
- In office 14 June 2017 – 13 February 2020
- Prime Minister: Theresa May; Boris Johnson
- Preceded by: Andrew Percy
- Succeeded by: Simon Clarke

Member of Parliament for Rossendale and Darwen
- In office 6 May 2010 – 30 May 2024
- Preceded by: Janet Anderson
- Succeeded by: Andy MacNae

Personal details
- Born: James Jacob Gilchrist Berry; 29 December 1978 (age 47) Liverpool, Merseyside, England
- Party: Reform UK (since 2025)
- Other political affiliations: Conservative Party (until 2025)
- Spouses: Charlotte Alexa (m. 2009; div. 2016) Alice Robinson (m. 2018)
- Children: 3
- Education: University of Sheffield; College of Law
- Profession: Politician; solicitor
- Website: Official website

Sir James Jacob Gilchrist Berry (born 29 December 1978) is a British politician and solicitor who served as Member of Parliament (MP) for Rossendale and Darwen from 2010 to 2024. He was Chairman of the Conservative Party and Minister without Portfolio from 6 September to 25 October 2022. Before this, he served as Minister of State for the Northern Powerhouse and Local Growth from 2017 to 2020 in the governments of Theresa May and Boris Johnson.

He was a member of the Conservative Party until he defected to Reform UK in July 2025.

== Early life and education ==
James Berry was born on 29 December 1978 in Liverpool and privately educated at Liverpool College, before studying for a law degree at Sheffield University. He trained to be a solicitor in Chester and in the City of London, qualifying as a solicitor in 2003. He worked for a number of legal practices, specialising in planning law.

== Parliamentary career ==
Berry was first elected as MP for Rossendale and Darwen at the 2010 general election, winning with 41.8% of the vote and a majority of 4,493.

In 2010, he was appointed Parliamentary private secretary (PPS) to Grant Shapps, the Minister for Housing and Local Government at the Department of Communities and Local Government, following Shapps to the Cabinet Office in 2012.

In April 2013, the prime minister, David Cameron, asked Berry to join the Number 10 Policy Unit, headed by Jo Johnson. His roles in this position included advising the Prime Minister on housing, regional growth and local government.

Berry sponsored the Local Government (Religious etc. Observances) Act 2015, which gave councils the right to hold religious prayers at the start of meetings.

At the 2015 general election, Berry was re-elected as MP for Rossendale and Darwen with an increased vote share of 46.6% and an increased majority of 5,654.

From July 2015 until January 2017, Berry served on the Parliamentary Finance Committee.

In May 2016, it emerged that Berry was one of a number of Conservative MPs being investigated by police in the 2015 general election party spending investigation, for allegedly spending more than the legal limit on constituency election campaign expenses. However, in April 2017, Lancashire Police confirmed that no further action would be taken.

Berry was opposed to Brexit prior to the 2016 referendum.

At the snap 2017 general election Berry was again re-elected, with an increased vote share of 50.8% and a decreased majority of 3,216.

=== Junior Minister ===
Following the 2017 election, Prime Minister Theresa May appointed Berry as Parliamentary Under-Secretary of State for the Northern Powerhouse and Local Growth, making him the third Northern Powerhouse minister in the space of two years. In March 2018, he described campaigners who forced the aerospace firm BAE Systems to withdraw as a sponsor of a flagship arts festival in North East England as "subsidy addicted artists" and "snowflakes".

After Boris Johnson became prime minister, Berry was promoted to Minister of State, with attendance at cabinet meetings. He was appointed to the Privy Council the next day.

At the 2019 general election Berry was again re-elected, with an increased vote share of 56.5% and an increased majority of 9,522.

He resigned from government in February 2020 after refusing a move to a ministerial office at the Foreign and Commonwealth Office in a cabinet reshuffle.

=== Chairman of the Conservative Party ===
On 6 September 2022, following the Conservative Party leadership election, the new prime minister Liz Truss appointed Berry to her government. He joined the Cabinet as Minister without Portfolio, and he was also appointed to the party role of Chairman of the Conservative Party.

Speaking on Sky News on 2 October 2022 about the approach the Liz Truss government was taking to enable households to afford their utility bills, Berry said that people could either cut their consumption or get a higher-paid job. He later apologised, describing his remarks as "clumsy".

=== Return to the backbenches ===
On 25 October 2022, Berry stood down as Chairman of the Conservative Party upon the ascension of Rishi Sunak to the premiership. Berry returned to the backbenches. In the 2024 general election, Berry lost his seat to Labour's Andy MacNae.

== Post-parliamentary career ==
Following his defeat at the 2024 general election, Berry undertook employment as Chief Operating Officer for the public affairs consultancy Fullbrook Strategies.

In July 2025, Berry defected to Reform UK, stating that the party was "challenging the old order" of British politics.

== Personal life ==
Berry lives in Rossendale and London. He married Charlotte Alexa in 2009. They divorced in September 2016. He has been married to Alice Robinson since May 2018. She was previously Boris Johnson's parliamentary office manager. The couple have three children. On 14 October 2022 it was announced that Berry had been knighted.

== Notes ==
Parliament of the United Kingdom
Preceded by Janet Anderson	Member of Parliament for Rossendale and Darwen; 2010–2024	Succeeded by Andy MacNae
Political offices
Preceded by Andrew Percy	Parliamentary Under-Secretary of State for the Northern Powerhouse and Local Growth; 2017–2019	Succeeded by Himself as Minister of State
Preceded by Himself as Parliamentary Under-Secretary of State	Minister of State for the Northern Powerhouse and Local Growth; 2019–2020	Succeeded by Simon Clarke
Preceded by Andrew Stephenson	Minister without Portfolio; 2022	Succeeded by Nadhim Zahawi
Party political offices
Preceded by Andrew Stephenson	Chairman of the Conservative Party; 2022	Succeeded by Nadhim Zahawi
