= My Body My Rules =

- Directed by: Daniel Greaves, Ruth Beni
- Written by: Ruth Beni
- Produced by: FORWARD and Ruth Beni
- Cinematography: Daniel Greaves
- Release date: 2015
- Running time: 3 minutes
- Country: United Kingdom

My Body My Rules is a 2015 three-minute animated film aimed at raising awareness of female genital mutilation (FGM) amongst primary school aged children in the UK. The film was developed as a visual aid to help facilitate sessions on FGM in primary schools in the UK and for use by professionals and non-governmental organizations working with younger children at risk of FGM. It was developed by Foundation for Women's Health, Research and Development (FORWARD) and Animage Films, and animated by Daniel Greaves, an Academy Award winning animator.

My Body My Rules was adapted from a previous animated short by FORWARD and Animage on the subject of FGM in the UK, entitled Needlecraft. Funded by Comic Relief and the Sigrid Rausing Trust, and intended for the general public and professional audience, Needlecraft was launched on the web in June 2015. It won a gold world medal at the New York Festivals in 2016. A third short film, The True Story of Ghati and Rhobi, was made for Africa.
