= Prohibition of Female Genital Mutilation (Scotland) Act 2005 =

Act of the Scottish Parliament

Female Genital Mutilation (Scotland) Act 2005 (Note: Section 8(1).)
- Act of the Scottish Parliament
- Scottish Parliament
- Long title: An Act of the Scottish Parliament to restate and amend the law relating to female genital mutilation and to provide for extra-territorial effect; and for connected purposes.
- Citation: 2005 asp 8
- Territorial extent: Scotland

Dates
- Royal assent: 1 July 2005
- Commencement: 1 September 2005 (Note: Section 8(2).)

Other legislation
- Amends: Criminal Procedure (Scotland) Act 1995
- Repeals/revokes: Prohibition of Female Circumcision Act 1985
- Amended by: Serious Crime Act 2015; Female Genital Mutilation (Protection and Guidance) (Scotland) Act 2020
- Relates to: Female Genital Mutilation Act 2003

Status: Amended

Text of statute as originally enacted

Revised text of statute as amended

Text of the Prohibition of Female Genital Mutilation (Scotland) Act 2005 as in force today (including any amendments) within the United Kingdom, from legislation.gov.uk.

The Prohibition of Female Genital Mutilation (Scotland) Act 2005 (asp 8) is an act of the Scottish Parliament. It extended previous legislation by also making it illegal for UK nationals to perform female genital mutilation outside the borders of the UK. There have been no known cases of girls from Scotland being sent abroad for the procedure. The Act also increased the maximum penalty from five to 14 years.

It replaced the Prohibition of Female Circumcision Act 1985. The corresponding legislation for the rest of the United Kingdom is the Female Genital Mutilation Act 2003.

== Background ==
Female Genital Mutilation (FGM) has been illegal in the United Kingdom since 1985 when the Prohibition of Female Circumcision Act 1985 was passed. Over the decades that this law was in place, no conviction could be mounted as the law itself was too vague to be enforced properly. In order to protect the women of the United Kingdom the Prohibition of Female Circumcision Act 1985 was repealed and replaced in 2003 when the Parliament of the United Kingdom passed the stricter Female Genital Mutilation Act 2003 and the Scottish Parliament passed the corresponding Prohibition of Female Genital Mutilation (Scotland) Act 2005.

The Scottish Prohibition of Female Genital Mutilation (Scotland) Act 2005 strengthens the original Prohibition of Female Circumcision Act 1985 by defining Female genital mutilation in multiple forms. Female genital mutilation (FGM) is defined in section 1 of the act is "to excise, infibulate or otherwise mutilate the whole or any part of the labia majora, labia minora, prepuce of the clitoris, clitoris or vagina of another person". While this was useful to draw convictions originally, the wording inadvertently also prohibited doctors and other people in the medical professions from giving several types of operations that may be necessary during and after child birth. The law was soon revised to say that no crime may be committed by an approved individual if the operation or procedure on another person is necessary for their physical or mental health; or if the surgical operation in question takes place during any stage of labour, or child birth, or if the operation takes place immediately after child birth for a purpose connected with said child birth or labour.

== Provisions ==
The act included an exemption for medically necessary procedures.

The act extended the coverage of the 2003 act to cover the children of asylum seekers and other non-UK citizens in Scotland.

== Later efforts ==
The Scottish Prohibition of Female Genital Mutilation (Scotland) Act 2005 continues to surpass the original Prohibition of Female Circumcision Act 1985 in preventing mutilation on a further level by adding the "Aiding and abetting female genital mutilation" clause to the act. The aiding and abetting clause as well as related article define aiding and abetting as "To plan, help, assist, brainwash, intimidate, persuade, encourage or to be involved in any way in circumcising any girl or woman. This includes fathers and grandfathers who demand that their daughter or granddaughter is circumcised, even if they do not arrange the ritual to be involved in any way in getting any woman or girl to circumcise herself." The clause was crucial in the process of mounting convictions for female genital mutilation as the original Prohibition of Female Circumcision Act 1985 only prohibited the actual act of the mutilation by whoever commits the procedure, but not the people who would arrange the procedure or those who convinced the woman in question to have her genitals mutilated.

The Scottish Prohibition of Female Genital Mutilation (Scotland) Act was further strengthened the Prohibition of Female Circumcision Act 1985, by outlining the punishments for committing Female genital mutilation of aiding and abetting female genital mutilation. Anyone convicted of Female genital mutilation or related offenses will be jailed for up to 14 years as well as a non-disclosed fine, and have their children sent to live with relatives. If the convicted does not have a visa or necessary documentation to remain in Britain, the convict in question as well as their immediate family will be deported to their country of origin and punished to the full extent of the law, as well as the possibility of being banned from working with children or returning to Britain. If the woman who has been mutilated is under the age of 17, she may be removed from the custody of her parents and be given medical treatment, while her parents or Care takers will be given strict conditions that they must comply with for the girl in question's health and protection. Furthermore any United Kingdom national or United Kingdom resident found attempting to leave the United Kingdom for the purpose of female genital mutilation will be treated as thought the offence was committed in Scotland, regardless of the actual location or destination.

There was controversy over the Prohibition of Female Genital Mutilation Act (Scotland) 2005, as some claim the law discriminated against African immigrants; to which the Scottish government responded "This new law applies to everyone in Scotland, no matter where they are from. Many communities which circumcise girls are African, but female circumcision also happens in other countries, including in some parts of the Middle East, India, Sri Lanka and Australia."
