= Serious Crime Act 2015 =

Act of the Parliament of the United Kingdom

Serious Crime Act 2015 (Note: Section 89.)
- Act of Parliament
- Parliament of the United Kingdom
- Long title: An Act to amend the Proceeds of Crime Act 2002, the Computer Misuse Act 1990, Part 4 of the Policing and Crime Act 2009, section 1 of the Children and Young Persons Act 1933, the Sexual Offences Act 2003, the Street Offences Act 1959, the Female Genital Mutilation Act 2003, the Prohibition of Female Genital Mutilation (Scotland) Act 2005, the Prison Act 1952 and the Terrorism Act 2006; to make provision about involvement in organised crime groups and about serious crime prevention orders; to make provision for the seizure and forfeiture of drug-cutting agents; to make it an offence to possess an item that contains advice or guidance about committing sexual offences against children; to create an offence in relation to controlling or coercive behaviour in intimate or family relationships; to make provision for the prevention or restriction of the use of communication devices by persons detained in custodial institutions; to make provision approving for the purposes of section 8 of the European Union Act 2011 certain draft decisions under Article 352 of the Treaty on the Functioning of the European Union relating to serious crime; to make provision about codes of practice that relate to the exercise and performance, in connection with the prevention or detection of serious crime, of powers and duties in relation to communications; and for connected purposes.
- Citation: 2015 c. 9
- Introduced by: Theresa May MP, Home Secretary (Commons); Lord Taylor of Holbeach (Lords)
- Territorial extent: United Kingdom (Note: Section 87.)

Dates
- Royal assent: 3 March 2015
- Commencement: Various (Note: Section 88.)
Other legislation
Amends	Criminal Appeal (Northern Ireland) Act 1980; Senior Courts Act 1981; Civil Jurisdiction and Judgments Act 1982; Courts and Legal Services Act 1990; Criminal Procedure (Scotland) Act 1995; Proceeds of Crime Act 2002; Serious Organised Crime and Police Act 2005; Computer Misuse Act 1990; Serious Crime Act 2007; Serious Organised Crime and Police Act 2005; Policing and Crime Act 2009; Children and Young Persons Act 1933; Sexual Offences Act 2003; Street Offences Act 1959; Female Genital Mutilation Act 2003; Prohibition of Female Genital Mutilation (Scotland) Act 2005; Prison Act 1952; Terrorism Act 2006; Legal Aid, Sentencing and Punishment of Offenders Act 2012
Amended by	Investigatory Powers Act 2016; Digital Economy Act 2017; Criminal Finances Act 2017; European Union (Withdrawal) Act 2018; Sentencing Act 2020; Domestic Abuse Act 2021

Status: Amended

History of passage through Parliament

Text of statute as originally enacted

Revised text of statute as amended

The Serious Crime Act 2015 (c. 9) is an act of the Parliament of the United Kingdom. Introduced in June 2014 as part of the Queen's Speech opening the 2014-15 session of Parliament, the bill was sponsored by the Home Office. It was passed by Parliament on 2 March 2015, and received royal assent on 3 March 2015.

A bill proceeding the act, that was proposed by Mark Williams, to strengthen child protection laws helped to raise awareness of the shortfalls in existing legislation, which led to a consultation that contributed to Part 5 of the Serious Crime Act 2015.

Other aspects the legislation dealt with included criminalising professionals and businesses that participate in organised crime, and ensuring there is effective legislation to deal with chemicals that are used as 'drug cutting agents'.

The Serious Crime Act 2015 consists of six parts:

- Proceeds of crime
- Computer misuse
- Organized, serious and gang-related crime
- Seizure and forfeiture of drug-cutting agents
- Protection of children and others
- Miscellaneous and general.

== Part 1: Proceeds of crime ==
This part amended the Proceeds of Crime Act 2002 in determining the extent of a defendant's interest in confiscated property, and amended the procedures surrounding costs and court sentencing. This included amending, defining, or creating regulations on the extent of a defendant's interest in proceeds of crime, the provision of information by third parties, the time-frame and manner of payment, absconding defendants, and connected purposes.

== Part 2: Computer misuse ==
This part amended the Computer Misuse Act 1990 in relation to hacking, creating viruses or Trojan Horses, the deliberate act of creating serious risks to computers or computer systems and amended the territorial extent of computer crimes. This included a new offence of impairing a computer to cause damage, with a 14 years' prison sentence for damage to the economy or environment, in addition to the United Kingdom adopting the EU Directive 2013/40/EU on attacks against information systems.

== Part 3: Organised, serious and gang-related crime ==
This part adopted the ratified UN Convention against Transnational Organised Crime. The new 'participation offence' encompassed not just those who carry out an act of serious crime, but those who provide materials, services or related infrastructure. The legislation extended elements of the Serious Crime Act 2007 to Scotland, and extended the making of a Serious Crime Prevention Order to include firearms offences and the cultivation of cannabis plants.

== Part 4: Seizure and forfeiture of drug-cutting agents ==
This part created and extended the power of search and seizure warrants relevant to investigations into the creation or ownership of substances used to cut drugs.

== Part 5: Protection of children, etc. ==
This part extended the definition of child cruelty to incorporate abuse, neglect or psychological damage, and amended existing legislation relating to paedophile material to include publications that advise on how to commit or facilitate sexual offences against children. It also prohibited intentional communication of a sexual nature with a minor (including encouraging the minor to communicate anything of a sexual nature) for the purpose of obtaining sexual gratification. Existing legislation on female genital mutilation was also amended by this part. This Part amended the Children and Young Persons Act 1933, making it explicit that the suffering of a child can be physical or psychological, and amended the offence of suffocating a child under the age of three. Finally, this part created the offence of "controlling or coercive behavior in an intimate or family relationship".

== Part 6: Miscellaneous and general ==
This part dealt with the preparation or training abroad for terrorist related activities, amendments related to the Treaty on the Functioning of the European Union in relation to serious crime, and consequential amendments. The unauthorised possession of a bladed instrument within a prison is made an explicit offence, amending the Prison Act 1952 (15 & 16 Geo. 6 & 1 Eliz. 2. c. 52) to include prisons, secure training centres and young offender institutions.
