= Efua Dorkenoo =

Ghanaian-British activist (1949–2014)

Efua Dorkenoo OBE
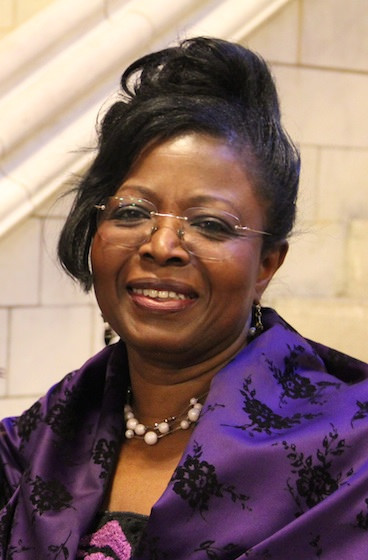
- Efua Dorkenoo, January 2014
- Born: 6 September 1949; Cape Coast, Gold Coast (now Ghana)
- Died: 18 October 2014 (aged 65); London, England
- Other name: Stella Efua Graham
- Education: London School of Hygiene & Tropical Medicine; City University London
- Occupations: Activist, campaigner against female genital mutilation
- Known for: Foundation for Women's Health, Research and Development (FORWARD)
- Spouses: Freddie Green; Bernard Dotse Dorkenoo
- Children: 2 sons

Efua Dorkenoo, OBE (6 September 1949 – 18 October 2014), affectionately known as "Mama Efua", was a Ghanaian-British campaigner against female genital mutilation (FGM) who pioneered the global movement to end the practice and worked internationally for more than 30 years to see the campaign "move from a problem lacking in recognition to a key issue for governments around the world."

== Early years ==
She was born on 6 September 1949 in Cape Coast, Gold Coast (now Ghana), where she attended Wesley Girls' High School. She moved to London at the age of 19 to study nursing, and eventually earned a master's degree at the London School of Hygiene & Tropical Medicine and a research fellowship at City University London. She was a staff nurse at various hospitals, including the Royal Free, and it was while training as a midwife that she became aware of the impact of FGM on women's lives.

== Campaigning work ==
She joined the Minority Rights Group and travelled to various parts of Africa to gather information for what was one of the earliest reports published on FGM in 1980. In 1983 she founded the Foundation for Women's Health, Research and Development (FORWARD), a British NGO that supports women who have experienced FGM and tries to eliminate the practice. She began working with the World Health Organization (WHO) in 1995 and was the acting director for women’s health there until 2001. She was Advocacy Director and, subsequently, Senior FGM Advisor for Equality Now (an international human rights organization). She was close friends with Alice Walker, advising on and featured in the documentary film Warrior Marks (1993) made by Walker and Pratibha Parmar and with Gloria Steinem, who wrote an introduction to Dorkenoo's 1994 book Cutting the Rose: Female Genital Mutilation.

== Honours and recognition ==
In 1994, Dorkenoo was appointed an Officer of the Order of the British Empire. In 2000, she and Gloria Steinem received Equality Now's international human rights award. In 2012, she was made honorary senior research fellow in the School of Health Sciences at City University London, and in 2013 she was named one of the BBC's 100 Women.

Dorkenoo's Cutting the Rose: Female Genital Mutilation (1994) was selected by an international jury in 2002 as one of "Africa's 100 Best Books of the 20th Century".

Dorkenoo died of cancer in London at the age of 65 on 18 October 2014.

== Selected publications ==
- Cutting The Rose: Female Genital Mutilation the Practice and its Prevention (Minority Rights Group, 1994).
- Report of the First Study Conference of Genital Mutilation of Girls in Europe/ Western World (1993)
- Child Protection and Female Genital Mutilation: Advice for Health, Education, and Social Work Profession (1992)
- Female Genital Mutilation: Proposals for Change (with Scilla Elworthy) (1992)
- Tradition! Tradition: A symbolic story on female genital mutilation (1992)
- As Stella Efua Graham with Scilla McLean (eds), Female Circumcision, Excision, and Infibulation (Minority Rights Group Report 47, 1980)
