= Female Genital Mutilation Act 2003 =

UK law criminalises female genital mutilation

Female Genital Mutilation Act 2003 (Note: Section 8(1).)
- Act of Parliament
- Parliament of the United Kingdom
- Long title: An Act to restate and amend the law relating to female genital mutilation; and for connected purposes.
- Citation: 2003 c. 31
- Introduced by: Baroness Rendell of Babergh (Lords)
- Territorial extent: England and Wales; Northern Ireland; (Note: Section 8(4).)

Dates
- Royal assent: 30 October 2003
- Commencement: 3 March 2004 (Note: Section 8(2)–(3). The Female Genital Mutilation Act 2003 (Commencement) Order 2004 (SI 2004/286).)
Other legislation
Amends	Schedule to the Visiting Forces Act 1952
Repeals/revokes	Prohibition of Female Circumcision Act 1985
Amended by	Serious Crime Act 2015; Wales Act 2017; Criminal Justice (Electronic Commerce) (Amendment) (EU Exit) Regulations 2021; Judicial Review and Courts Act 2022 (Magistrates’ Court Sentencing Powers) Regulations 2023
Relates to	Prohibition of Female Genital Mutilation (Scotland) Act 2005

Status: Amended

Text of statute as originally enacted

Revised text of statute as amended

The Female Genital Mutilation Act 2003 (c. 31) is an act of the Parliament of the United Kingdom applying to England, Wales and Northern Ireland. It replaced the Prohibition of Female Circumcision Act 1985, extending the ban on female genital mutilation to address the practice of taking girls abroad to undergo FGM procedures, and increased the maximum penalty from 5 to 14 years' imprisonment. The Act does not extend to Scotland: the corresponding legislation there is the Prohibition of Female Genital Mutilation (Scotland) Act 2005.

Experts said in 2003 that about 74,000 women in the UK had been subjected to the procedure, and that up to 7,000 girls would be at risk of being subjected to it abroad, and on 14 July of that year the proposed new law was introduced by the Labour peer Ruth Rendell as House of Lords Bill 98.

== Provisions ==
Section 1 of the act restates the prohibition in similar language to the 1985 act, and provides exemptions for medically necessary procedures. Sections 2–4 define related offences, making it illegal to assist someone to perform FGM on themselves, or to cause FGM abroad (a form of extraterritorial jurisdiction).

Further provisions were added to the act by the Serious Crime Act 2015, which:

- added the offence of failing to protect a child in one's care from FGM, with a maximum prison sentence of seven years
- introduced anonymity for victims of FGM, similar to that provided for victims of sexual offences
- imposed mandatory reporting duties on professionals coming into contact with children at risk from FGM
- introduced FGM prevention orders, to allow courts to impose particular requirements in relation to individual children identified as at risk

== Prosecutions ==
It was noted for many years that no one had been successfully prosecuted under either the 1985 or 2003 acts, and in December 2013 it was reported that Minister of State for the Home Office Norman Baker had encouraged the Director of Public Prosecutions to reopen or reconsider six cases involving female genital mutilation. In February 2014 it was announced that the first prosecution was scheduled soon thereafter. It was estimated that 170,000 women had been subject to FGM up till then.

In March 2014, a doctor from the Whittington Hospital near Highgate London was the first person charged with an offence contrary to the Female Genital Mutilation Act 2003, he was cleared in February 2015.

The first FGM prevention orders were obtained in July 2015 in Bedfordshire. In January 2019 a Ugandan woman from London was convicted of mutilating her three-year-old daughter: the first successful prosecution for an offence under the act.

== See also ==
- Female genital mutilation in the United Kingdom
