= Comfort Momoh =

British midwife who specializes in the study of female genital mutilation

Comfort Momoh MBE
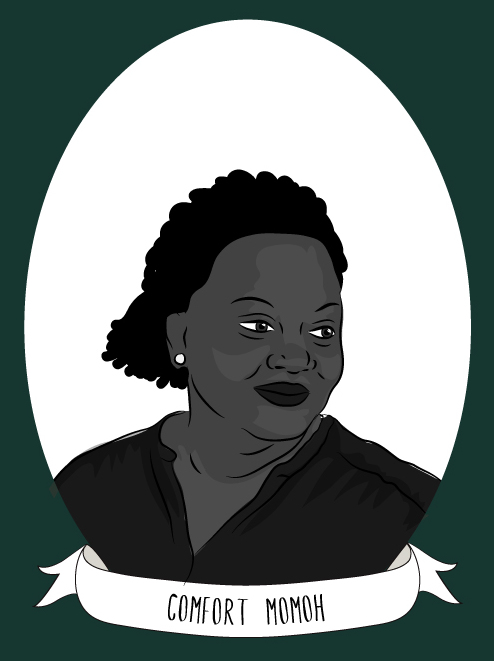
- by Julie Gough
- Born: c. 1962; Lagos, Nigeria
- Education: BSc (2002), women's healthcare, Florence Nightingale School of Nursing and Midwifery, King's College London.
- Occupation: Midwife
- Known for: Working with FGM survivors
- Spouse: Robert Momoh
- Children: Two
- Awards: MBE (2008); Honorary doctorate, Middlesex University (2008); Fellowship, Royal College of Midwives (2016)

Comfort Iyabo Amah Momoh, MBE (born c. 1962) is a British midwife who specializes in the treatment of female genital mutilation (FGM). Born in Nigeria, Momoh is a member of the British FGM national clinical group, established in 2007 to train health professionals in how to deal with the practice. Until 2017 she served as a public-health specialist at Guy's and St Thomas' NHS Foundation Trust in London. She is the editor of Female Genital Mutilation (2005).

== Early life and education ==
Momoh was born in Lagos, Nigeria, to a Nigerian-Ghanaian family. Her maternal grandmother died days before Momoh's birth, and she was mostly raised by her paternal grandmother.

In 1981 she moved to the UK to train as a nurse at North Middlesex Hospital. It was at Middlesex that she first studied FGM, which is not practised by her tribe in Nigeria. In 2002 she obtained a BSc in women's healthcare from the Florence Nightingale School of Nursing and Midwifery, King's College London. She received a Florence Nightingale Foundation scholarship in 2007 to conduct research into FGM in Africa, and in 2015 the foundation awarded her a travel scholarship to visit the United States to study their approach to FGM.

== Career ==
In 1997, Momoh set up the African Well Women's Clinic at St Thomas's Hospital, dedicated to caring for women affected by FGM. As of 2013, the clinic was seeing around 300 women a year and performing two defibulation operations a week, which involves opening a vagina sewn shut as a result of FGM Type III.

Momoh worked as a temporary adviser to the World Health Organization in 1999 and represented the UK at the United Nations Commission on the Status of Women in 2001. From around 2007, she worked as a public-health specialist at Guy's and St Thomas' NHS Foundation Trust, before retiring in 2017. Momoh also runs Global Comfort Ltd., a private consultancy. She was included in 2014 in the London Evening Standard's list of 1000 most influential people in London.

== Awards ==
In the 2008 New Year Honours, Momoh was appointed a Member of the Order of the British Empire (MBE) for services to women's healthcare. She was awarded an honorary doctorate from Middlesex University in 2008. In 2011, she won a Gathering of Africa's Best (GAB) award. She was chosen as 2015 Alumna of the Year by King's College London, and in 2016, she was awarded a fellowship by the Royal College of Midwives.

== 2017 complaint ==
In September 2017, BBC Newsnight raised questions about the examination of at least five children by Momoh. The programme explored the weight given by British authorities to the physical examination of girls for FGM and an allegation that the examinations caused trauma to children who had not in fact experienced FGM. Families were reportedly fearful of being accused and split up. Since 2012, the Royal College of Paediatrics and Child Health has required that child-abuse victims be examined by specialist doctors. Newsnight reported that Momoh had referred to herself as "Dr", although her doctorate is an honorary one, and that during a 2014 court case, the judge, James Munby, had criticized her evidence as unreliable. Momoh responded that she had done nothing wrong and had nothing to hide. Nimco Ali, an anti-FGM activist, told The Times: "Comfort has led work to end FGM for over 30 years and has enriched the lives of countless women and girls. Attempts at character assassination of such a great woman [are] shameful."

== Selected works ==
- Momoh, C (2004). "Female genital mutilation". Curr Opin Obstet Gynecol. 16 (6): 477–80. doi:10.1097/00001703-200412000-00007. PMID 15534443.
- (2005). Comfort Momoh (ed.) Female Genital Mutilation, Oxford: Radcliffe Publishing, 2005.
- Momoh, C (2010). "Female genital mutilation: a global and local concern". Pract Midwife. 13 (4): 12–4. PMID 20476610.
- Momoh, C (2010). "A day in the life of ... a female genital mutilation/public health specialist". Midwives: 50. PMID 24888058.
- Bewley, S; Creighton, S; Momoh, C (2010). "Female genital mutilation". BMJ. 340 c2728. doi:10.1136/bmj.c2728. PMID 20519272.
- (2014). Katherine A. Zakhour and Comfort Momoh. "Female genital mutilation", in Maureen Dalton (ed.). Forensic Gynaecology. Cambridge University Press, 142–147.
- Amasanti, ML; Imcha, M; Momoh, C (2016). "Compassionate and Proactive Interventions by Health Workers in the United Kingdom: A Better Approach to Prevent and Respond to Female Genital Mutilation?". PLOS Med. 13 (3) e1001982. doi:10.1371/journal.pmed.1001982. PMC 4803291. PMID 27002322.
- Momoh, C; Olufade, O; Redman-Pinard, P (2016). "What nurses need to know about female genital mutilation". Br J Nurs. 25 (9): S30-4. doi:10.12968/bjon.2016.25.9.S30. PMID 27172505.
