= Justina Mutale =

Zambian author, humanitarian and philanthropist

Her Execellency, Dr. Justina Mutale
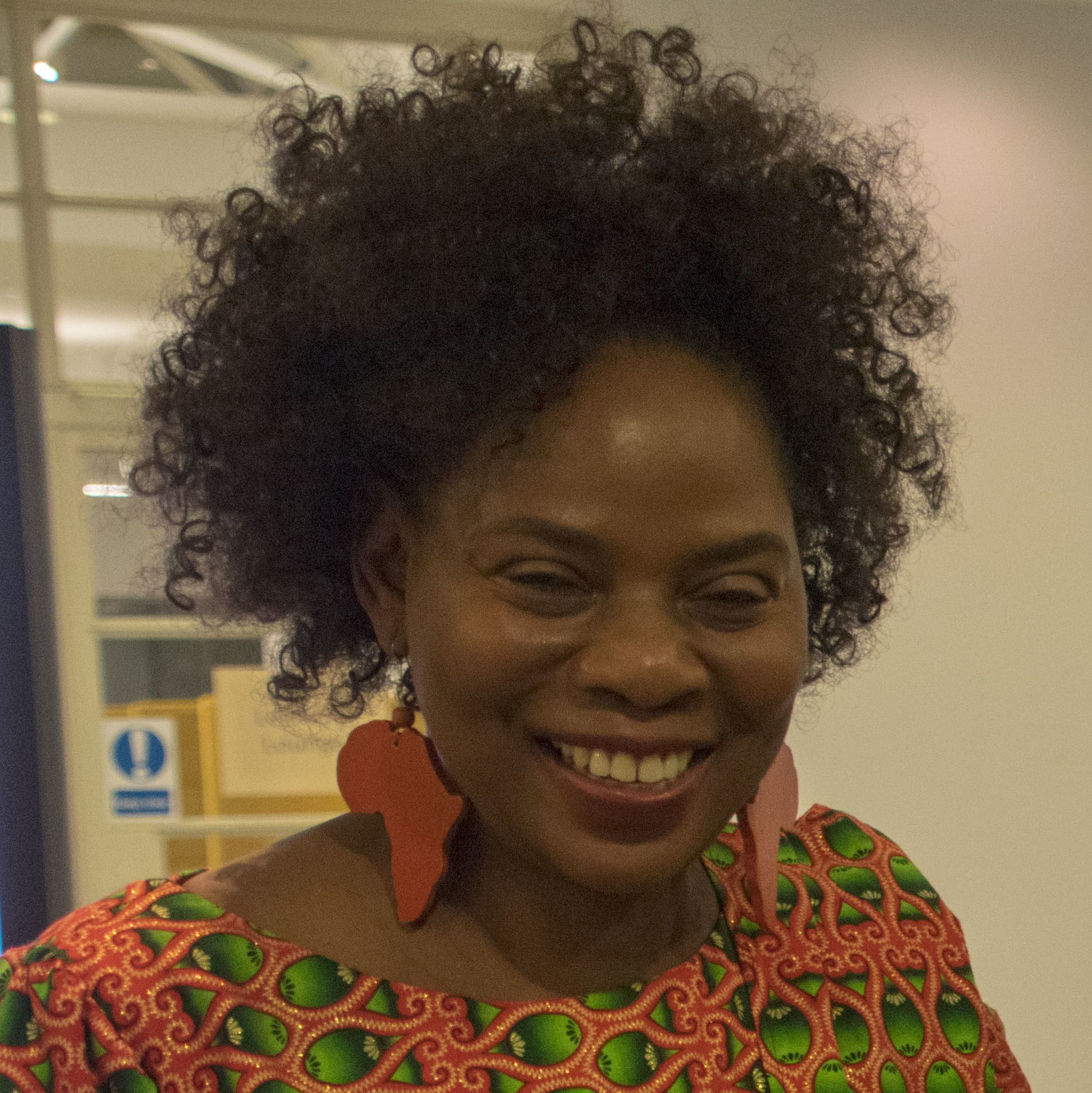
- Occupations: Philanthropist, author
- Years active: 2003–present
- Organization: Justina Mutale Foundation
- Known for: Gender equality
- Board member of: Women's Economic Forum
- Website: https://justinemutale.com

Justina Mutale is a Zambian born author, philanthropist and advocate for gender equality and quality education. She is best known for her work in advancing gender equality, especially in areas of women's political participation and the economic empowerment of women and girls by providing leadership and entrepreneurship training and mentorship. In 2012, she was named as African Woman of the Year by the African Achievers Awards and Africa's Best Female Philanthropist by Tropics Magazine in 2018. Avance Media named Mutale as one of the 100 Most Influential African Women in 2019. Reputation Poll also named her in the list of the 100 Most Reputable Africans in 2018 and 2025.

== Early life and education ==
Justina Mutale was born in Zambia to Bemba and Namwanga in 1961. She attended Mwashi Primary School in Kabwe, Zambia and went on to Mkushi Boarding Secondary School and Kabwe Secondary School. She studied political science; International Relations and Public & Cultural Diplomacy at degree level, and Public Administration at Masters level. She is also a recipient of more than six Honorary Doctorate degrees, including a Doctor of Humane Letters from the International University of Higher Martial Arts Education in 2016.

== Career ==
Prior to founding her own organization, Mutale worked in the Commonwealth Secretariat headquarters in London, where she spent 10 years in the Gender Section of the Social Transformation Programs Division, to address issues of gender equality and gender mainstreaming in Commonwealth member states. After leaving the Commonwealth Secretariat, she founded the Justina Mutale Foundation to advocate for gender equality and the provision of quality education. Her Foundation provides scholarships for girls from rural and disadvantaged communities in Africa to access tertiary education in various parts of the world.

She also founded Positive Runway, a worldwide response campaign to fight the spread of HIV/AIDS.

In 2013 Mutale was appointed the Global Envoy for Gender Equality at the International Women's Think Tank and also served as the Diaspora Ambassador and Spokesperson for the Enough Food For Everyone IF campaign, which is a coalition of more than 100 development organizations working to end world hunger by lobbying the G8 to revise policies that accelerate world hunger.

In 2015 she was appointed to the Distinguished Membership of the Royal Biographical Institute and joined the African Union Diaspora Forum (AU-DAF) to support gender initiatives during the 2016 AU Summit. She was appointed as an International Ambassador for the Global Officials of Dignity.

In 2016 her foundation awarded scholarships to 25 Zambian girls, including boxing champion Catherine Phiri to pursue higher learning in educational institutions globally.

Justina sits on the board of the Women's Economic Forum and is the founder and convener of the World Summit on Women and Girls.

The Justina Mutale Foundation launched a $10m Presidential STEM Fellows Program to help unemployed and underemployed first degree holders from Zambia and other African countries to pursue master's degrees in various STEM based subjects.

Mutale has served as the President of the National Alliance of Women's Organizations in the United Kingdom since 2024.

== Publications ==
She co-authored "Women on Corporate Boards: An International Perspective” and in 2021, published her first book, "The Art of Iconic Leadership: Power Secrets of Female World Leaders".

== Awards and recognition ==
In 2012 Mutale was named the African Woman of the Year. She also won the Lifetime Achievement Award at the African Achievers Awards and was inducted to the African Leaders Hall of Fame by the New African Magazine. She was named in the top 10 African and Caribbean Women in the United Kingdom by AfroNews. She also received the Women Advancement Forum, SDG Award for the role of her activism in achieving the United nations Sustainable Development Goal 5. In 2017, she was named in Powerlist of the 100 Most Influential Black People in the United Kingdom and inducted into the World Book of Greatness in 2020.
