= Offside (association football) =

Law in association football

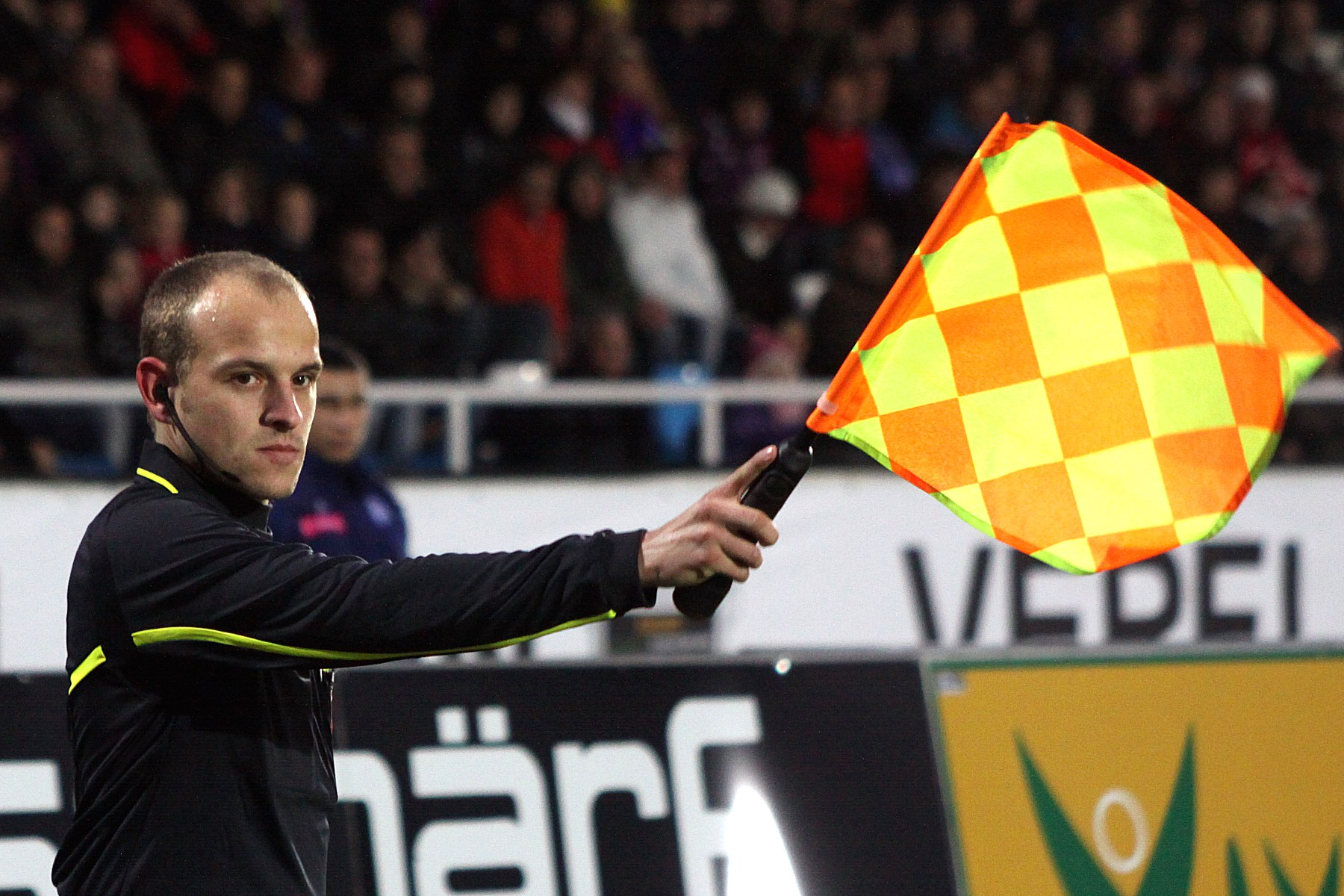
An assistant referee signals for offside by raising his flag.

Offside is one of the laws in association football, codified in Law 11 of the Laws of the Game. The law states that a player is in an offside position if they are in the opponents' half of the pitch and closer to the opponents' goal line than both the ball and the second-last opponent (the last opponent is usually, but not necessarily, the goalkeeper).

Being in an offside position is not an offence in itself, but a player so positioned when the ball is played by a teammate can be judged guilty of an offside offence if they receive the ball or will otherwise become "involved in active play", will "interfere with an opponent", or will "gain an advantage" by being in that position. Offside is often considered one of the most difficult-to-understand aspects of the sport.

== Significance ==
Offside is judged at the moment the ball is last touched by the most recent teammate to touch the ball. Being in an offside position is not an offence in itself. A player who was in an offside position at the moment the ball was last touched or played by a teammate must then become involved in active play, in the opinion of the referee, in order for an offence to occur. When the offside offence occurs, the referee stops play, and awards an indirect free kick to the defending team from the place where the offending player became involved in active play.

The offside offence is neither a foul nor misconduct as it does not belong to Law 12. Like fouls, however, any play (such as the scoring of a goal) that occurs after an offence has taken place, but before the referee is able to stop the play, is nullified. The only time an offence related to offside is cautionable is if a defender deliberately leaves the field in order to deceive their opponents regarding a player's offside position, or if a forward, having left the field, returns and gains an advantage. In neither of these cases is the player penalised for being offside; instead they are cautioned for acts of unsporting behaviour.

An attacker who is able to receive the ball behind the opposition defenders is often in a good position to score. The offside rule limits attackers' ability to do this, requiring that they be onside when the ball is played forward. Though restricted, well-timed passes and fast running allow an attacker to move into such a situation after the ball is kicked forward without committing the offence. Officiating decisions regarding offside, which can often be a matter of only centimetres or inches, can be critical in games, as they may determine whether a promising attack can continue, or even if a goal is allowed to stand.

One of the main duties of the assistant referees is to assist the referee in adjudicating offside—their position on the sidelines giving a more useful view sideways across the pitch. Assistant referees communicate that an offside offence has occurred by raising a signal flag. However, as with all officiating decisions in the game, adjudicating offside is ultimately up to the referee, who can overrule the advice of their assistants if they see fit.

== Application ==
The application of the offside rule may be considered in three steps: offside position, offside offence, and offside sanction.

=== Offside position ===
The blue forward on the left of the diagram is in an offside position as they are ahead of both the ball and the second-last opponent (marked by the dotted line) in the opponents' half of the pitch. This does not necessarily mean they are committing an offside offence. It becomes an offence only if the ball is played or touched by a teammate while the player is in an offside position and subsequently becomes involved in active play according to the definitions given in the Laws of the Game no matter if any of these events occur after they move to an onside position.

The blue forward in the penalty area of the diagram is not in an offside position, as they are behind the ball, despite the fact that they are closer to the opponents' goal line than the second-last opponent.

A player is in an "offside position" if they are in the opposing team's half of the field and also "nearer to the opponents' goal line than both the ball and the second-last opponent." The 2005 edition of the Laws of the Game included a new IFAB decision that stated, "In the definition of offside position, 'nearer to his opponents' goal line' means that any part of their head, body or feet is nearer to their opponents' goal line than both the ball and the second last opponent. The arms are not included in this definition". By 2017, the wording had changed to say that, in judging offside position, "The hands and arms of all players, including the goalkeepers, are not considered." In other words, a player is in an offside position if two conditions are met:

- Any part of the player's head, body or feet is in the opponents' half of the field (excluding the half-way line).
- Any part of the player's head, body or feet is closer to the opponents' goal line than both the ball and the second-last opponent.

The goalkeeper counts as an opponent in the second condition, but it is not necessary that the last opponent be the goalkeeper.

=== Offside offence ===
A player in an offside position at the moment the ball is touched or played by a teammate is only penalised for committing an offside offence if, in the opinion of the referee, they become involved in active play by:

Interfering with play
"playing or touching the ball passed or touched by a team-mate"
Interfering with an opponent
"preventing an opponent from playing or being able to play the ball by clearly obstructing the opponent's line of vision or
challenging an opponent for the ball or
clearly attempting to play a ball which is close to them when this action impacts on an opponent or
making an obvious action which clearly impacts on the ability of an opponent to play the ball"
Gaining an advantage by playing the ball or interfering with an opponent when it has
"- rebounded or been deflected off the goalpost, crossbar, match official or an opponent
– been deliberately saved by any opponent"

In addition to the above criteria, in the 2017–18 edition of the Laws of the Game, the IFAB made a further clarification that, "In situations where a player moving from, or standing in, an offside position is in the way of an opponent and interferes with the movement of the opponent towards the ball this is an offside offence if it impacts on the ability of the opponent to play or challenge for the ball."

There is no offside offence if a player receives the ball directly from a goal kick, a corner kick, or a throw-in. It is also not an offence if the ball was last deliberately played by an opponent (except for a deliberate save). In this context, according to the IFAB, "A 'save' is when a player stops, or attempts to stop, a ball which is going into or very close to the goal with any part of the body except the hands/arms (unless the goalkeeper within the penalty area)."

An offside offence may occur if a player receives the ball directly from either a direct free kick, indirect free kick or dropped-ball.

Since offside is judged at the time the ball is touched or played by a teammate, not when the player receives the ball, it is possible for a player to receive the ball significantly past the second-to-last opponent, or even the last opponent, without committing an offence, since an onside player is free to run to any position after the ball is played.

A player who was offside when their teammate played the ball (and therefore liable for an offside offence should they interfere with play) but becomes onside when the ball is played by another player then ceases to be liable for an offside offence. That is, the determination of offside is reset each time the ball is played by a different onside player.

Determining whether a player is "involved in active play" can be complex. The quote, "If he's not interfering with play, what's he doing on the pitch?" has been attributed to Bill Nicholson and Danny Blanchflower. In an effort to avoid such criticisms, which were based on the fact that phrases such as "interfering with play", "interfering with an opponent", and "gaining an advantage" were not clearly defined, FIFA issued new guidelines for interpreting the offside law in 2003, and these were incorporated into Law 11 in July 2005. The new wording sought to define the three cases more precisely, but a number of football associations and confederations continued to request more information about what movements a player in an offside position could make without interfering with an opponent. In response to these requests, IFAB circular 3 was issued in 2015 to provide additional guidance on the criteria for interfering with an opponent. This additional guidance is now included in the main body of the law, and forms the last three conditions under the heading "Interfering with an opponent" as shown above. The circular also contained additional guidance on the meaning of a save, in the context of a ball that has "been deliberately saved by any opponent."

=== Offside sanction ===
The sanction for an offside offence is an indirect free kick for the opponent at the place where the offence occurred, even if it is in the player's own half of the field of play.

=== Officiating ===
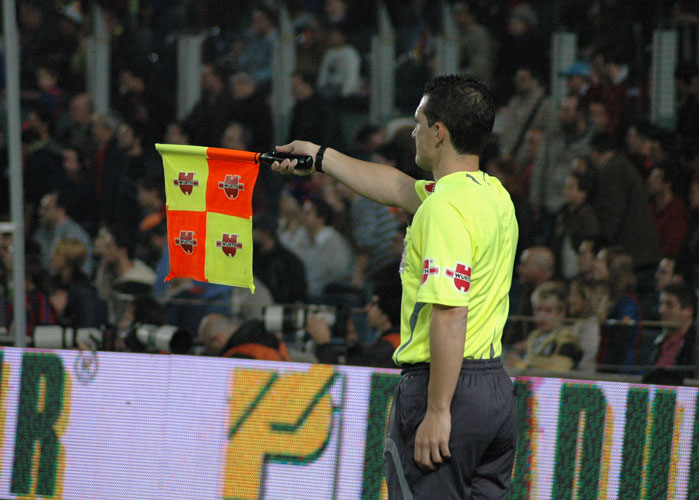
An assistant referee signals that the offside offence was in the middle of the pitch; on the far side the flag would be pointed up at 45 degrees and near the assistant referee it would be pointed down at 45 degrees.

In enforcing this rule, the referee depends greatly on an assistant referee, who generally keeps in line with the second-to-last opponent, the ball, or the halfway line, whichever is closer to the goal line of their relevant end. An assistant referee signals for an offside offence by first raising their flag to a vertical position and then, if the referee stops play, by partly lowering their flag to an angle that signifies the location of the offence:

- Flag pointed at a 45-degree angle downwards: offence has occurred in the third of the pitch nearest to the assistant referee;
- Flag parallel to the ground: offence has occurred in the middle third of the pitch;
- Flag pointed at a 45-degree angle upwards: offence has occurred in the third of the pitch furthest from the assistant referee.

The assistant referees' task with regard to offside can be difficult, as they need to keep up with attacks and counter-attacks, consider which players are in an offside position when the ball is played, and then determine whether and when the offside-positioned players become involved in active play. The risk of false judgement is further increased by the foreshortening effect, which occurs when the distance between the attacking player and the assistant referee is significantly different from the distance to the defending player, and the assistant referee is not directly in line with the defender. The difficulty of offside officiating is often underestimated by spectators. Trying to judge if a player is level with an opponent at the moment the ball is kicked is not easy: if an attacker and a defender are running in opposite directions, they can be two metres (six feet) apart in less than a second.

Some researchers believe that offside officiating errors are "optically inevitable". It has been argued that human beings and technological media are incapable of accurately detecting an offside position quickly enough to make a timely decision. Sometimes it simply is not possible to keep all the relevant players in the visual field at once. There have been some proposals for automated enforcement of the offside rule.

==== VAR and semi-automation ====
In matches using video assistant referees (VAR), assistant referees who decide on offsides are required to avoid raising the flag for an offside decision until the play proceeds to a natural conclusion, unless the offside is obvious. This allows a team that might have been called for an offside offence to instead continue and any subsequent goal to be checked by VAR.

Beginning in the mid-2020s, semi-automated offside technology (SAOT) began to be used at high-level games. SAOT systems use multiple high-speed cameras to determine the positions of players at the moment the ball is kicked, assisting the VAR in making speedy offside decisions. SAOT produces 3D virtual replays of the situation which are displayed on both stadium and broadcast screens.

== Motivation ==
The motivations for offside rules varied at different times, and were not always clearly stated when the rules were changed.

According to the anonymous author of a November 1863 newspaper article in the Sporting Gazette, "For a player to place himself nearer his opponent's goal than the ball, and to wait for it to be kicked to him, is not anywhere recognised but as being decidedly unfair". Curry and Dunning suggest that offside play was considered "highly ungentlemanly" at some schools; this attitude may have been reflected in the use of terminology such as "sneaking" at Eton and "loiter[ing]" at Cambridge.

In general, offside rules intend to prevent players from "goal-hanging"–staying near the opponent's goal and waiting for the ball to be passed to them directly. This was considered to be unsportsmanlike and made the game boring. In contrast, the offside rules force players not to get ahead of the ball, and thus favour dribbling the ball and short passes over few long passes.

== History ==
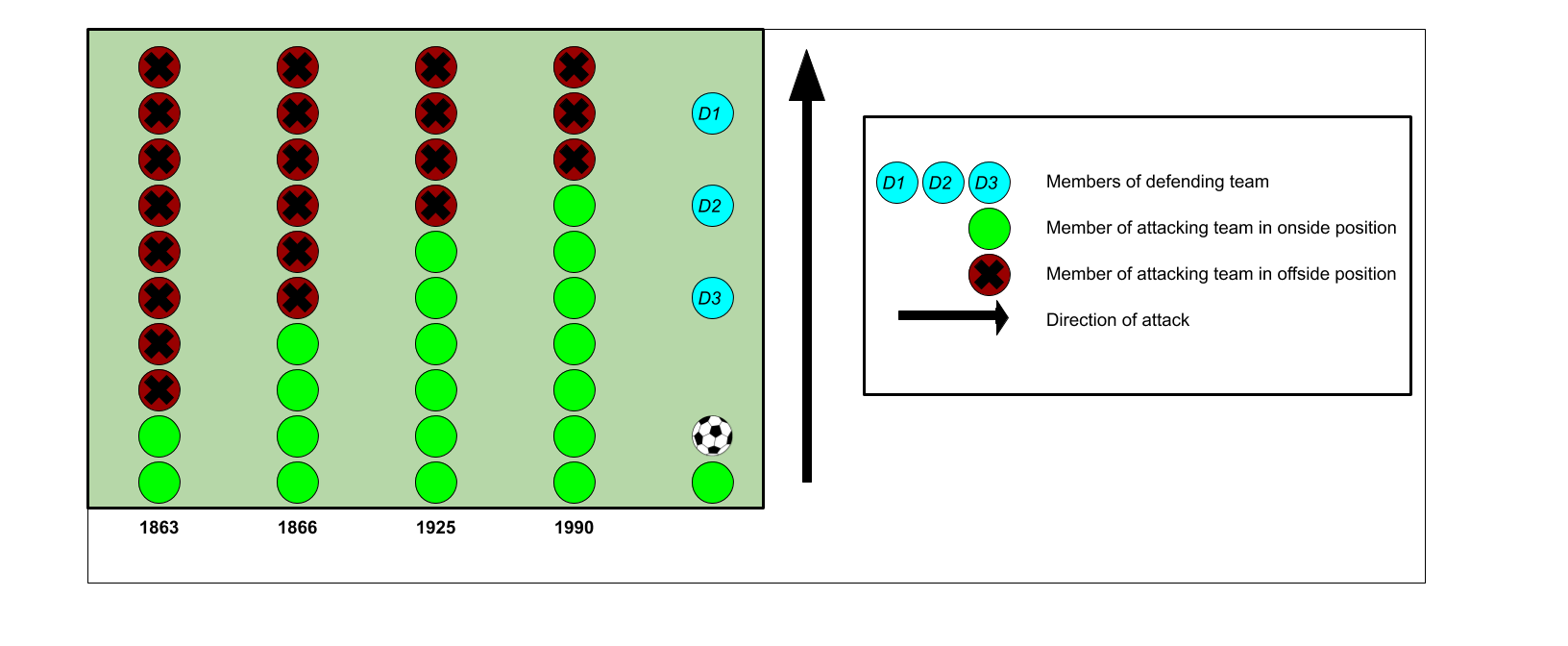
Historical development of the laws relating to offside position

=== Before 1863 ===
==== Traditional games ====
A law similar to offside was used in the game of hurling to goals played in Cornwall in the early 17th century:

[H]ee who hath the ball [...] must deale no Fore-ball, viz. he may not throw it to any of his mates, standing neerer the goale, then himselfe.

==== School and university football ====
Offside laws are found in the largely uncodified and informal football games played at English public schools in the early 19th century. An 1832 article discussing the Eton wall game complained of "[t]he interminable multiplicity of rules about sneaking, picking up, throwing, rolling, in straight, with a vast number more", using the term "sneaking" to refer to Eton's offside law. The novel Tom Brown's School Days, published in 1857 but based on the author's experiences at Rugby School from 1834 to 1842, discussed that school's offside law:

My sons! [...] you have gone past the ball, and must struggle now right through the scrummage, and get round and back again to your own side, before you can be of any further use

The first published set of laws of any code of football (Rugby School, 1845), stated that "[a] player is off his side if the ball has touched one of his own side behind him, until the other side touch it." Such a player was prevented from kicking the ball, touching the ball down, or interfering with an opponent.

Many other school and university laws from this period were similar to Rugby School's in that they were "strict"—i.e. any player ahead of the ball was in an off-side position. (This is similar to the current offside law in rugby, under which any player between the ball and the opponent's goal who takes part in play, is liable to be penalised.) Such laws included Shrewsbury School (1855), Uppingham School (1857), Trinity College, Hartford (1858), Winchester College (1863), and the Cambridge Rules of 1863.

Some school and university rules provided an exception to this general pattern. In the 1847 laws of the Eton Field Game, a player could not be considered "sneaking" if there were four or more opponents between him and the opponents' goal line. A similar "rule of four" was found in the 1856 Cambridge Rules and the rules of Charterhouse School (1863).

==== Club football ====
Most surviving rules of independent football clubs from before 1860 lack any offside law. This is true of the brief handwritten set of laws for the Foot-Ball Club of Edinburgh (1833), the published laws of Surrey Football Club (1849), the first set of laws of Sheffield Football Club (1858) and those of Melbourne Football Club (1859). In the Sheffield game, players known as "kick-throughs" were positioned permanently near the opponents' goal.

In the early 1860s, this began to change. In 1861, Forest FC adopted a set of laws based on the 1856 Cambridge Rules, with its "rule of four". The 1862 laws of Barnes FC featured a strict offside law. Sheffield FC adopted a weak offside law at the beginning of the 1863–64 season.

==== J. C. Thring ====
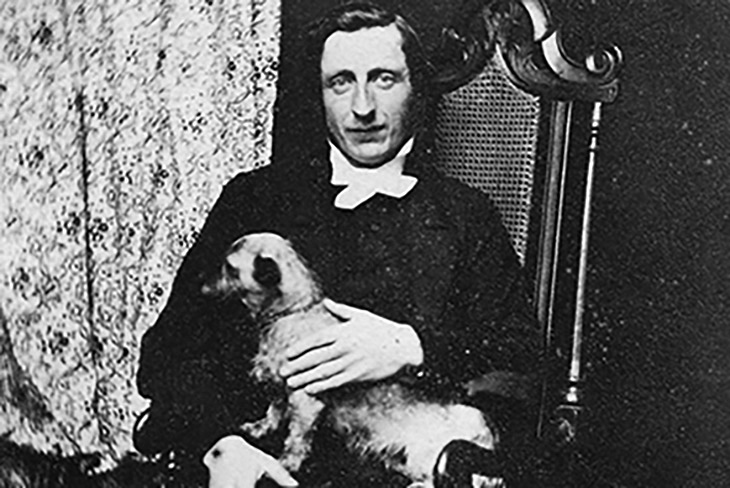
J. C. Thring

J. C. Thring was an advocate for the strictest possible offside law. A resident master at Uppingham School from 1859 to 1864, Thring criticised most existing offside laws for being too lax. The Rugby laws, for example, were at fault because they permitted an offside player to rejoin play immediately after an opponent touched the ball, while Eton's rule of four allowed "an immense amount of sneaking" when the number of players was unlimited.

Thring expressed his views through correspondence in the sporting newspapers such as The Field, and through the publication in 1862 of The Simplest Game, a proposed set of laws of football. In The Simplest Game, Thring included a strict offside law which required a player in an offside position ("out of play", in Thring's terminology) to "return behind the ball as soon as possible".

The influence of Thring's views is evidenced by the adoption of his proposed offside law from The Simplest Game in the first draft of the FA laws (see below).

=== The FA laws of 1863 ===
On 17 November 1863, the newly formed Football Association adopted a resolution mirroring Thring's law from the Simplest Game:

A player is "out of play" immediately he is in front of the ball and must return behind the ball as soon as possible. If the ball is kicked by his own side past a player he may not touch or kick it, or advance until one of the other side has first kicked it or one of his own side on a level with or in front of him has been able to kick it.

This text was reflected in the first draft of laws drawn up by FA secretary Ebenezer Morley.

On 24 November, Morley presented his draft laws to the FA for final approval. That meeting was, however, disrupted by a dispute over the subject of "hacking" (allowing players to carry the ball, provided they could be kicked in the shins by opponents when doing so, in the manner of Rugby School). The opponents of hacking brought the delegates' attention to the Cambridge Rules of 1863 (which banned carrying and hacking): Discussion of the Cambridge rules, and suggestions for possible communication with Cambridge on the subject, served to delay the final "settlement" of the laws to a further meeting, on 1 December. A number of representatives who supported rugby-style football did not attend this additional meeting, resulting in hacking and carrying being banned.

Although the offside law was not itself a significant issue in the dispute between the pro- and anti-hacking clubs, it was completely rewritten. The original law, taken from Thring's Simplest Game, was replaced by a modified version of the equivalent law from the Cambridge Rules:

When a player has kicked the ball any one of the same side who is nearer to the opponent's goal line is out of play and may not touch the ball himself nor in any way whatever prevent any other player from doing so until the ball has been played; but no player is out of play when the ball is kicked from behind the goal line.

The law adopted by the FA was "strict"—i.e., it penalised any player in front of the ball. There was one exception for the "kick from behind the goal line" (the 1863 laws' equivalent of a goal kick). This exception was necessary because every player on the attacking side would have otherwise been "out of play" from such a kick.

=== Subsequent developments: offside position ===
==== Three-player rule (1866) ====
At the first revision of the FA laws, in February 1866, an important qualifier was added to soften the "strict" offside law:

When a player has kicked the ball, any one of the same side who is nearer to the opponents' goal line is out of play, and may not touch the ball himself, nor in any way whatever prevent any other player from doing so, until the ball has been played, unless there are at least three of his opponents between him and their own goal; but no player is out of play when the ball is kicked from behind the goal line.

At the FA's meeting, the alteration "gave rise to a lengthy discussion, many thinking with Mr Morley that it would be better to do away with the off side [law] altogether, especially as the Sheffield clubs had none. It being found, however, that the rule could not be expunged without notice, the alteration was passed."

Contemporaneous reports do not indicate the reason for the change. Charles Alcock, writing in 1890, suggested that it was made in order to induce two public schools, Westminster and Charterhouse, to join the association. Those two schools did indeed become members of the FA after the next annual FA meeting (February 1867), in response to a letter-writing campaign by newly installed FA secretary Robert Graham.

==== Early proposals for change (1867–1874) ====
Over the next seven years, there were several attempts to change the three-player rule, but none was successful:

- In 1867, Barnes FC proposed that the offside rule should be removed altogether, arguing that "a player did not stop to count whether there were three of his opponents between him and their own goal".
- It was also proposed that the FA should revert to its original "strict" offside rule. This change was introduced in 1868 (Branham College), 1871 ("The Oxford Association") and 1872 (Notts County).
- There were attempts to introduce the one-player rule of the Sheffield Football Association in 1867 (Sheffield FC), 1872 (Sheffield Football Association), 1873 (Nottingham Forest), and 1874 (Sheffield Association).

Offside was the subject of the biggest dispute between the Sheffield Football Association (which produced its own "Sheffield Rules") and the Football Association. However, the two codes were eventually unified without any change in this area; the Sheffield Clubs accepted the FA's three-player offside rule in 1877, after the FA compromised by allowing the throw-in to be taken in any direction.

==== Offside in own half (1907) ====
The original laws allowed players to be in an offside position even when in their own half. This happened rarely, but was possible when one team pressed high up the field, for example in a Sunderland v Wolverhampton Wanderers match in December 1901. When an attacking team adopted the so-called "one back" game, in which only the goalkeeper and one outfield player remained in defensive positions, it was even possible for players to be caught offside in their own penalty area.

In May 1905, Clyde FC suggested that players should not be offside in their own half, but this suggestion was rejected by the Scottish Football Association. It was objected that the change would lead to "forwards hanging about close to the half-way line, as opportunists". After the Scotland v England international of April 1906 ended with the Scottish wingers being repeatedly caught offside by England's use of a "one back" game, Clyde again proposed the same rule-change to the Scottish FA meeting: this time it was accepted.

The Scottish proposal gained support in England. At the 1906 meeting of the International Football Association Board, the Scottish FA announced that it would introduce the proposed change at the next annual meeting, in 1907. In March 1907, the council of the [English] Football Association approved this change, and it was passed by IFAB in June 1907.

==== Two-player rule (1925) ====
The Scottish FA urged the change from a three-player to a two-player offside rule as early as 1893. Such a change was first proposed at a meeting of IFAB in 1894, where it was rejected. It was proposed again by the SFA in 1902, upon the urging of Celtic FC, and again rejected. A further proposal from the SFA also failed in 1913, after the Football Association objected. The SFA advanced the same proposal in 1914, when it was again rejected after opposition from both the Football Association and the Football Association of Wales.

Meetings of the International Board were suspended after 1914 because of the First World War. After they resumed in 1920, the SFA once again proposed the two-player rule in 1922, 1923, and 1924. In 1922 and 1923, the Scottish Association withdrew its proposal after English FA opposed it. In 1924, the Scottish proposal was once again opposed by the English FA, and defeated; it was, however, indicated that a version of the proposal would be adopted the next year.

On 30 March 1925, the FA arranged a trial match at Highbury where two proposed changes to the offside rules were tested. During the first half, a player could not be offside unless within forty yards of the opponents' goal-line. In the second half, the two-player rule was used.

The two-player proposal was considered by the FA at its annual meeting on 8 June. Proponents cited the new rule's potential to reduce stoppages, avoid refereeing errors, and improve the spectacle, while opponents complained that it would give "undue advantage to attackers"; referees were overwhelmingly opposed to the change. The two-player rule was nevertheless approved by the FA by a large majority. At IFAB's meeting later that month, the two-player rule finally became part of the Laws of the Game.

The two-player rule was one of the more significant rule changes in the history of the game during the 20th century. It led to an immediate change in the style of play, with the game becoming more stretched, "short passing giv[ing] way to longer balls", and the development of the W-M formation. It also led to an increase in goalscoring: 4,700 goals were scored in 1,848 Football League games in 1924–25. This number rose to 6,373 goals (from the same number of games) in 1925–26.

==== Attacker level with second-last defender (1990) ====
In 1990, IFAB declared that an attacker level with the second-last defender is onside, whereas previously such a player had been considered offside. This change, proposed by the Scottish FA, was made in order to "encourage the attacking team" by "giving the attacking player an advantage over the defender".

==== Parts of body (2005) ====
In 2005, IFAB clarified that, when evaluating an attacking player's position for the purposes of the offside law, the part of the player's head, body or feet closest to the defending team's goal-line should be considered, with the hands and arms being excluded because "there is no advantage to be gained if only the arms are in advance of the opponent". In 2016, it was further clarified that this principle should apply to all players, both attackers and defenders, including the goalkeeper.

==== Defender outside the field of play (2009) ====
In 2009, it was stated that a defender who leaves the field of play without the referee's permission must be considered to be on the nearest boundary line for the purposes of deciding whether an attacker is in an offside position.

==== Halfway line (2016) ====
In 2016, it was clarified that a player on the halfway line itself cannot be in an offside position: part of the player's head, body or feet must be within the opponent's half of the field of play in order to be considered offside.

==== Unadopted experiments ====
During the 1973–74 and 1974–75 seasons, an experimental version of the offside rule was operated in the Scottish League Cup and Drybrough Cup competitions. The concept was that offside should only apply in the last 18 yards (16 m) of play (inside or beside the penalty area). To signify this, the horizontal line of the penalty area was extended to the touchlines. FIFA President Sir Stanley Rous attended the 1973 Scottish League Cup Final, which was played using these rules. The manager of one of the teams involved, Celtic manager Jock Stein, complained that it was unfair to expect teams to play under one set of rules in one game and then a different set a few days before or later. The experiment was quietly dropped after the 1974–75 season, as no proposal for a further experiment or rule change was submitted for the Scottish Football Association board to consider. It was briefly experimented again in the 1991 FIFA U-17 World Championship, in Italy.

In 1972, the North American Soccer League adopted a variation of the offside rule in which it added a line on the field 35 yards from each goal line; a player could only be offside within that area of the opponent's half. The rule was dropped in 1982 at the insistence of FIFA which threatened to withdraw recognition of the league if it did not apply all of the official rules of football.

=== Subsequent developments: exceptions at the restart of play ===
==== Goal kick ====
Since the first FA laws of 1863, a player has not been penalised for being in an offside position at the moment a teammate takes a goal kick. (According to the "strict" offside law used in 1863, every player on the attacking side would automatically have been in an offside position from such a goalkick, since it had to be taken from the goal line and a player could be in an offside position even when in their own half.)

==== Throw-in ====
Under the original laws of 1863, it was not possible to be offside from a throw-in; however, since the ball was required to be thrown in at right-angles to the touch-line, it would have been unusual for a player to gain significant advantage from being ahead of the ball.

In 1877, the throw-in law was changed to allow the ball to be thrown in any direction. The next year (1878) a new law was introduced to allow a player to be offside from a throw-in.

This situation lasted until 1920, when the law was altered to prevent a player being offside from a throw-in. This rule-change was praised on the grounds that it would deter teams from "seeking safety or wasting time by sending [the ball] into touch", and thus reduce stoppages.

==== Corner kick ====
When first introduced in 1872, the corner kick was required to be taken from the corner-flag itself, which made it impossible for an attacking player to be in an offside position relative to the ball. In 1874, the corner-kick was allowed to be taken up to one yard from the corner-flag, thus opening up the possibility of a player being in an offside position. At the International Football Conference of December 1882, it was agreed that a player should not be offside from a corner-kick; this change was incorporated into the Laws of the Game in 1883.

==== Free kick ====
The laws of football have always permitted an offside offence to be committed from a free kick. The free kick contrasts, in this respect, with other restarts of play such as the goal kick, corner kick, and throw-in.

A 1920 proposal by the FA to exempt the free-kick from the offside rule was unexpectedly rejected by IFAB. A further unsuccessful proposal to remove the possibility of being offside from a direct free-kick was rejected in 1929. Similar proposals to prevent offside offences from any free-kick were advanced in 1974 and 1986, each time without success. In 1987, the Football Association (FA) obtained the permission of IFAB to test such a rule in the 1987–88 GM Vauxhall Conference. At the next annual meeting, the FA reported to IFAB that the experiment had, as predicted, "assisted further the non-offending team and also generated more action near goal, resulting in greater excitement for players and spectators"; it nevertheless withdrew the proposal.

== Offside trap ==
The offside trap is a defensive tactic designed to force the attacking team into an offside position. Just before an attacking player is played a through ball, the last defender or defenders move upfield, isolating the attacker into an offside position. The execution requires careful timing by the defence and is considered a risk, since running upfield against the direction of attack may leave the goal exposed. Now that changes to the interpretations of "interfering with play, interfering with an opponent and gaining an advantage" mean a player is not guilty of an offside offence unless they become directly and clearly involved in active play, players not involved in active play cannot be "caught offside", making the tactic riskier. An attacker, upon realising they are in an offside position, may simply choose to avoid interfering with play until the ball is played by someone else.

It was pioneered in the early 20th century by Notts County and later adopted in the 1960s by influential Argentine coach Osvaldo Zubeldía. In the 1980s, Italian manager Arrigo Sacchi was known for using a high defensive line, with distance between the defence and midfield lines never greater than 25 to 30 metres (yards), and the offside trap with his teams. He introduced a more attacking–minded tactical philosophy with A.C. Milan, which was highly successful, namely an aggressive high-pressing system, which used a 4–4–2 formation, an attractive, fast, attacking, and possession-based playing style, and which also used innovative elements such as zonal marking and a high back–line line playing the offside trap, which largely deviated from previous systems in Italian football, despite still maintaining defensive solidity.

Liverpool F.C. under Jürgen Klopp, a noted follower of Sacchi, were known for their highly effective offside trap. It involved playing a high defensive line with quick centre-backs like Virgil van Dijk and Ibrahima Konaté who could move forward quickly to catch opponents offside. In the 2021–22 Premier League season, they caught 53% more opponents offside than the next best team (144 times compared to Manchester City's 94).

Not all offside traps need to have a high line; it can be executed from anywhere on the pitch. Manuel Pellegrini often used the offside trap with the defenders sitting at the edge of their own box. The positioning of the defensive line dictates the available space that the opponents can run into. By adopting a high line, the opposition sometimes may be crammed into their own half, while a lower defensive line gives less space to run in behind.

== General and cited references ==
- Wilson, Jonathan (2013) [2009]. Inverting the Pyramid. New York: Nation Books. ISBN 978-1-56858-963-3.
