= Charles Thring =

English cricketer

Personal information
- Full name: Charles Henry Meredith Thring
- Born: 21 October 1861; Uppingham, Rutland, England
- Died: 11 April 1939 (aged 77); Chilcompton, Somerset, England
- Batting: Unknown
- Bowling: Right-arm fast
- Relatives: Theodore Thring (uncle)

Domestic team information
- Years: Team
- 1889: Marylebone Cricket Club

Career statistics
| Competition | First-class |
|---|---|
| Matches | 1 |
| Runs scored | 12 |
| Batting average | 12.00 |
| 100s/50s | –/– |
| Top score | 12 |
| Catches/stumpings | –/– |
- Source: Cricinfo, 7 September 2021

Charles Henry Meredith Thring (21 January 1861 — 11 April 1939) was an English first-class cricketer and scholastic agent.

The son of John Charles Thring, a schoolmaster at Uppingham School, he was born at Uppingham in January 1861. He was educated at Marlborough College. Thring played first-class cricket for the Marylebone Cricket Club (MCC) against Oxford University at Oxford in 1889. Batting once in the match, he was dismissed in for 12 runs by Reginald Moss in the MCC first innings. Thring was a partner in the scholastic agency Askin, Gabbitas and Thring, which recruited schoolmasters to English public schools; the company still operates as of 2026. Thring died in April 1939 at Chilcompton, Somerset. His uncle, Theodore Thring, also played first-class cricket.
