= Theodore Thring =

English cricketer and barrister

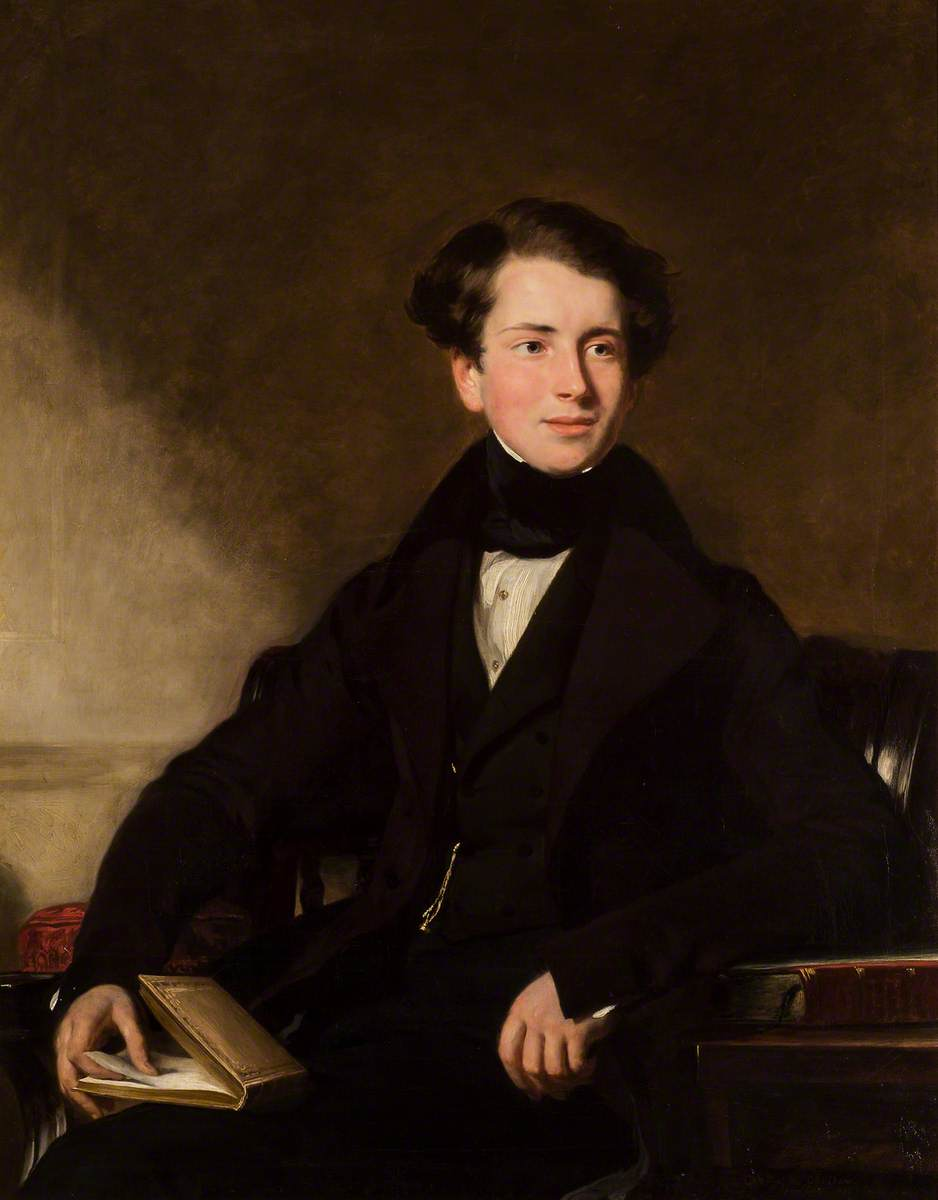

Personal information
- Full name: Theodore Thring
- Born: 4 August 1816; Castle Cary, Somerset, England
- Died: 28 September 1891 (aged 75); Castle Cary, Somerset, England
- Batting: Unknown
- Relatives: Charles Thring (nephew)

Domestic team information
- Years: Team
- 1840: Marylebone Cricket Club

Career statistics
Competition	First-class
Matches	1
Runs scored	7
Batting average	7.00
100s/50s	–/–
Top score	7
Catches/stumpings	1/–
- Source: Cricinfo, 6 September 2021

Theodore Thring JP DL (4 August 1816 — 28 September 1891) was an English first-class cricketer and barrister.

The son of The Reverend John Gale Dalton Thring and Sarah née Jenkyn, he was born in Somerset at Castle Cary in August 1816. He was educated at Eton College, before going up to Trinity College, Cambridge.

Thring did not play first-class cricket for Cambridge University Cricket Club while studying at Trinity, but he did appear for the Marylebone Cricket Club (MCC) against Oxford University at Oxford in 1840. Batting once in the match, he was dismissed for 7 runs in the MCC first innings by Nicholas Darnell.

A student of the Inner Temple, he was called to the bar to practice as a barrister in January 1843. He was appointed the commissioner of bankruptcy for Liverpool in 1869, having been the joint-registrar since 1862. He was later deputy chairman of the quarter sessions for Somerset. He was appointed a deputy lieutenant for Somerset in May 1875, in addition to serving as a justice of the peace for the county. He was the author of treatise on The Criminal Law of the Navy and the Land Drainage Act. Thring died at Castle Cary on 28 September 1891, two days after the death of his centenarian mother. His brothers were the lawyer and civil servant Henry Thring, 1st Baron Thring, the clergyman and hymn writer Godfrey Thring and the clergyman and teacher John Charles Thring. His nephew, Charles Thring, also played first-class cricket.
