= Henry de Winton =

British cleric (1823–1895)

Henry de Winton (7 November 1823 – 7 April 1895) was Archdeacon of Brecon from 1875 until 1895.

De Winton was born Henry Wilkins in Hay-on-Wye, the fourth son of the Rev. Walter Wilkins, clerk, of Hay Castle. The family later adopted its ancestral surname "de Winton". Henry was educated at Shrewsbury School and Trinity College, Cambridge.

According to N. L. Jackson, while de Winton was studying at Cambridge in 1846, "two old Shrewsbury boys, Messrs. H. de Winton and J. C. Thring, persuaded some Old Etonians to join them and formed a [football] club. Matches were few and far between, but some were played on Parker's Piece. Unfortunately, the game was not popular at the 'Varsity then, and the club did not last long". On the basis of this passage, de Winton has been credited with playing a part in the development of one of the earliest sets of "Cambridge rules", which were significant in the history of football.

De Winton died on 7 April 1895 in Tenby after suffering an attack of influenza.
