= John Charles Thring =

British sportsman

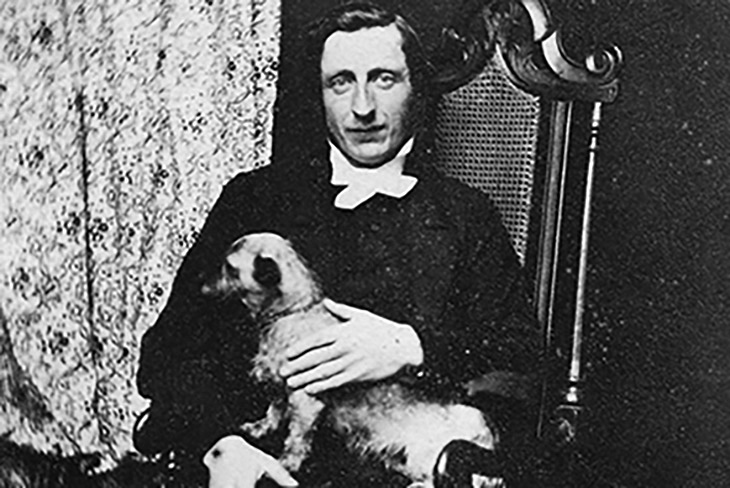
- Born: 11 June 1824; Alford, Somerset
- Died: 3 October 1909 (aged 85); Dunmow, Essex
- Other names: J. C. Thring, Charles Thring
- Occupations: Clergyman, teacher
- Known for: Contribution to history of association football
- Notable work: The Simplest Game
- Parents: Rev. John Gale Dalton Thring (father); Sarah Thring (née Jenkyns) (mother)
- Family: Theodore Thring (brother); Henry Thring (brother); Godfrey Thring (brother); Edward Thring (brother)

John Charles Thring (11 June 1824 – 3 October 1909), known during his life as Charles Thring or J. C. Thring, was an English clergyman and teacher, notable for his contributions to the early history of association football.

== Early life ==
Thring was born 11 June 1824 in Alford, Somerset, the fifth son of the rector, Rev. John Gale Dalton Thring and Sarah née Jenkyns.

He studied at Winchester College, Shrewsbury School and St John's College, Cambridge, graduating as a Bachelor of Arts in 1847. The next year, he was appointed as an assistant curate to his brother Godfrey Thring at Alford-with-Hornblotton, Somerset. He was ordained deacon in December 1849. From 1855 to 1857, he served as curate in Cirencester, then from 1857 to 1859 at Overton and Fyfield, Wiltshire.

He married Lydia Meredith in May 1858.

In 1859, Thring was appointed assistant master of Uppingham School, joining his brother Edward who was headmaster there.

== Sportsman ==
=== Shrewsbury ===
At the time Thring attended (1836–1843), Shrewsbury School played its own distinctive code of football, of which Thring later provided one detail: "the goals at one end of the field were marked on a wall". According to a description of the game dating from 1863, it disallowed all handling of the ball except for catching, and used an exceptionally wide goal of 40 feet, with a goal allowed to be scored at any height.

No record exists of football matches from Thring's time at Shrewsbury, but he is known to have played on the school cricket team in 1842 and 1843.

=== Cambridge ===
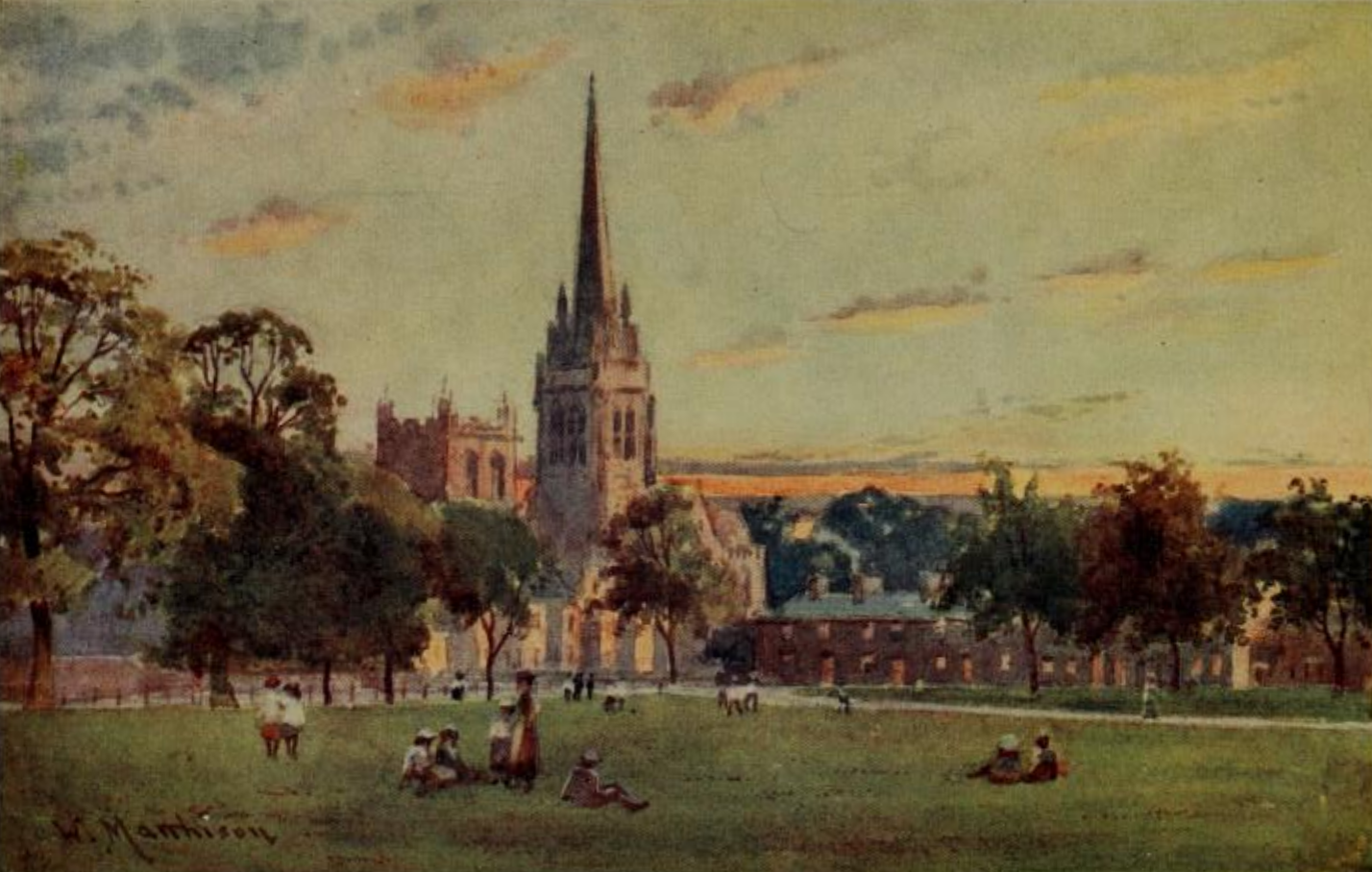
Illustration of Parker's Piece, (1907)

While at Cambridge, Thring's involvement in football continued. According to N. L. Jackson, in 1846 "two old Shrewsbury boys, Messrs H. de Winton and J. C. Thring, persuaded some Old Etonians to join them and formed a club. Matches were few and far between, but some were played on Parker's Piece. Unfortunately, the game was not popular at the 'Varsity then, and the club did not last long". According to Thring's own account, written in 1861:

[I]n 1846, when an attempt was made to introduce a common game, and form a really respectable club, at Cambridge, the Rugby game was found to be the great obstacle to the combination of Eton, Winchester, and Shrewsbury men in forming a football club.

This was among the first of several known attempts to formulate a set of "compromise" rules of football at Cambridge between alumni of different schools. In his History of the Football Association, Geoffrey Green describes it as "the first positive step to create an identity of views and a common code of laws [of football] acceptable to as many as possible", and laments the absence of a plaque "to commemorate this historic moment".

=== Uppingham ===
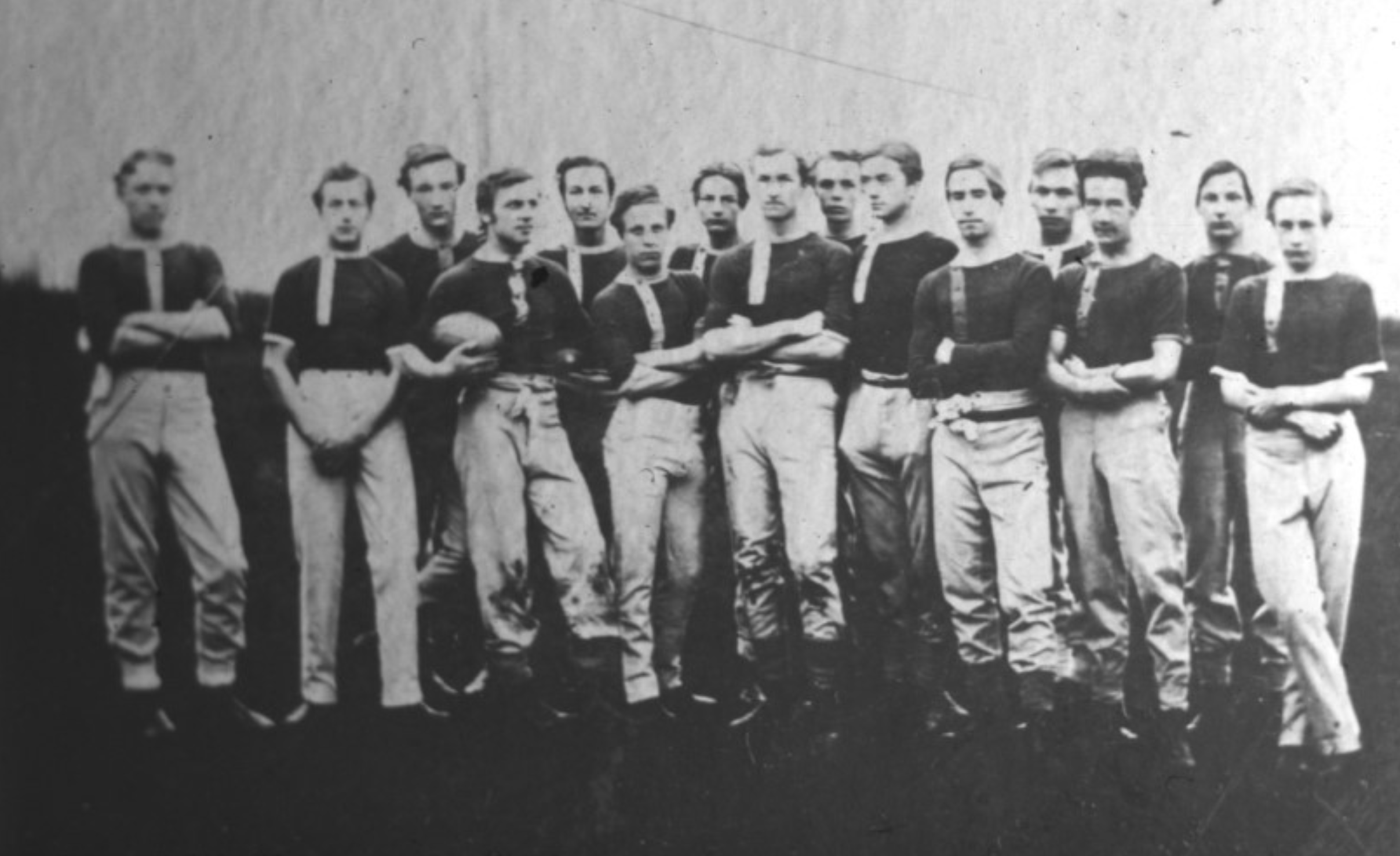
Uppingham School football team, 1862

Rules of football for Uppingham School had been created under the supervision of Charles Thring's brother Edward in 1857. They allowed the ball to be carried in a similar fashion to the Rugby rules.

==== "The Simplest Game" ====
During his time as a resident master at Uppingham (1859–1864), Charles Thring became intensely involved in efforts to create a common code of football. His interest seems to have been stimulated by the publication in the 14 December 1861 issue of The Field of an article calling for such a common code. Thring immediately responded with a letter criticising the Rugby code in strong terms, referring to its allowance of "hacking" (kicking opponents' shins) as "a blot", "thoroughly un-English", and "barbarous". In its place, Thring urged the following as the "very first principles of football":

- the ball should be kept on the ground as much as possible
- players should be "always behind the ball" (Thring objected to the Rugby offside law as being too lax, since it allowed an offside player to rejoin play after an opponent touched the ball)

Thring went on to describe in some detail the features of his proposed game, which featured a round ball, a "barrel-shaped" playing area, a goal scored by kicking the ball under rather than over the bar, and an extremely strict offside law.

During the first half of 1862, Thring continued to engage in discussion of the merits of different rules of football via correspondence published in The Field. This culminated in his publication, later in 1862, of a pamphlet entitled The Rules of Foot-ball: The Winter Game. Revised for the use of schools. The pamphlet proposed a set of laws for what Thring called "The Simplest Game":

1. A goal is scored whenever the ball is forced through the goal and under the bar, except it be thrown by hand.
2. Hands may be used only to stop a ball and place it on the ground before the feet.
3. Kicks must be aimed only at the ball.
4. A player may not kick the ball whilst in the air.
5. No tripping up or heel kicking allowed.
6. Whenever a ball is kicked beyond the side flags, it must be returned by the player who kicked it, from the spot it passed the flag line in a straight line towards the middle of the ground.
7. When a ball is kicked behind the line of goal, it shall be kicked off from that line by one of the side whose goal it is.
8. No player may stand within six paces of the kicker when he is kicking off.
9. A player is 'out of play' immediately he is in front of the ball, and must return behind the ball as soon as possible. If the ball is kicked by his own side past a player, he may not touch or kick it, or advance, until one of the other side has first kicked it, or one of his own side, having followed it up, has been able, when in front of him, to kick it.
10. No charging allowed when a player is out of play; that is, immediately the ball is behind him.

==== Football Association ====
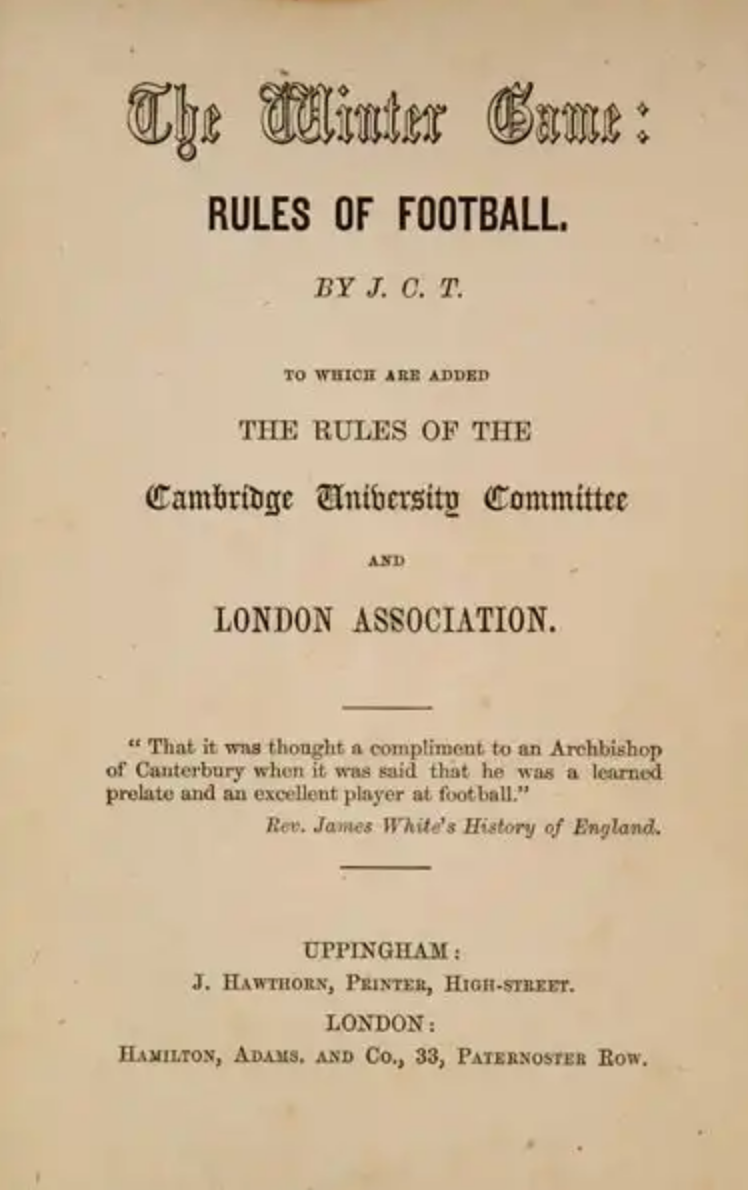
The second edition of Thring's The Winter Game included the FA ("London Association") and Cambridge rules, in addition to Thring's own "Simplest Game"

In a letter to the Daily Telegraph of 24 September 1863, Thring urged the formation of a "parliament [that] could sit with sufficient authority to issue a new code of laws" for football.

When the formation of the Football Association was announced shortly afterwards, Thring responded enthusiastically, sending voluminous correspondence to the Association's secretary Ebenezer Morley. In a letter dated 13 November, Thring wrote that Uppingham School was "extremely desirous of joining" the association. In another communication dated the following day, he promised to send the necessary subscription. These letters made a notable contrast with the generally negative attitude of other public schools (Charterhouse and Harrow had both refused to participate, Shrewsbury would subsequently do so, and Rugby, Eton and Winchester failed to reply at all).

Thring offered several suggestions as to the rules the FA ought to adopt. He advocated for the use of a crossbar, and objected to the draft rules' allowance of hacking and carrying the ball. The FA would go on to remove hacking and carrying from its draft rules, under the influence of the Cambridge Rules of 1863. Thring's suggested crossbar was not, however, included in the FA's 1863 laws, which allowed a goal to be scored at any height; a tape (corresponding to the crossbar) would not be introduced until the second edition of the FA's laws, in 1866. Thring's objection to the use of the term "touch" (for the area that was out of play on either side of the ground) was also ignored.

The offside rule from The Simplest Game was unanimously adopted by the FA at its meeting of 17 November 1863, and appeared in the first draft of the rules created by Morley, but it was replaced in later drafts with a modified version of the equivalent law from the Cambridge rules.

Thring requested permission to include the FA's rules (along with the Cambridge rules of October 1863), in an expanded reissue of The Winter Game. He would go on to bring out this second edition of his work in December 1863.

In 1867, Thring sent another letter to the FA's general meeting. He repeated his objection to the use of the term "touch", and also expressed disapproval of the FA offside law, which had been relaxed the previous year. These objections were once again ignored. Thring also objected to the "touch down" tie-breaker which had been introduced by the FA in 1866; this was removed from the laws as the result of a proposal by Wanderers FC.

=== Legacy ===
Despite his enthusiasm, Thring was ultimately unsuccessful in persuading Uppingham School to participate in the Football Association. He wrote on 20 November 1863: "I am sorry to hear that Uppingham was not represented on Tuesday. They say the time is very inconvenient, but the fact is they do not like to do so, as all the other schools have refused, and there is talk of a school congress, which they hope to attend". In a list of FA members from January 1864, the name of Uppingham School is crossed out, along with a note: "withdrawn by desire of their captain".

The extent to which Thring's principles were actually put into practice at Uppingham is not clear. Contemporary descriptions of Uppingham football from 1863 and 1864 indicate that the ball was oval rather than round, a "bully" was a method of scoring, awarded when the ball was touched down behind the goal-line, and the ball could be "caught" and "carried". The 1871 edition of Uppingham's rules was broadly similar to the 1857 version, and continued to permit Rugby-style running with the ball. Uppingham would eventually abandon its own code of football for rugby in 1889.

Writing in 1899, N. L. Jackson drew attention to the manner in which Thring's "Simplest Game" anticipated many later developments in the FA's code, even going so far as to credit it with being "the groundwork on which the [Football] Association code was built". Thring's set of laws is also acknowledged as the inspiration behind the title of Paul Gardner's 1976 book The Simplest Game.

== Later career and death ==
Thring continued to serve as master at Uppingham until 1868 or 1869, but in 1864, following a dispute with his brother Edward, he and his wife ceased to live at the school, instead residing at the Chantry House at Bradford-on-Avon. In January 1866, Thring captained Bradford Football Club in a match against local rivals Trowbridge.

From 1870 to 1874, Thring again served as curate at Alford. From 1875 to 1891, he served as chaplain to the Bradford Union (a workhouse for the poor in Bradford-on Avon). He subsequently moved to Hemel Hempstead, and then to Dunmow, Essex for the last decade of his life. He died there in 1909. He was survived by his widow Lydia, five sons, and three daughters. One of his sons was the cricketer Charles Thring.

== Works ==
- J. C. T. (1862). The Rules of Foot-ball: The Winter Game. Revised for the Use of Schools. Uppingham: Hawthorn.
- J. C. T. (1863). The Winter Game, or Rules of Football, to which are added the Rules of the Cambridge University Committee and the London Association. Uppingham: Hawthorn.
