= Cambridge rules =

Early codifications of rules of football

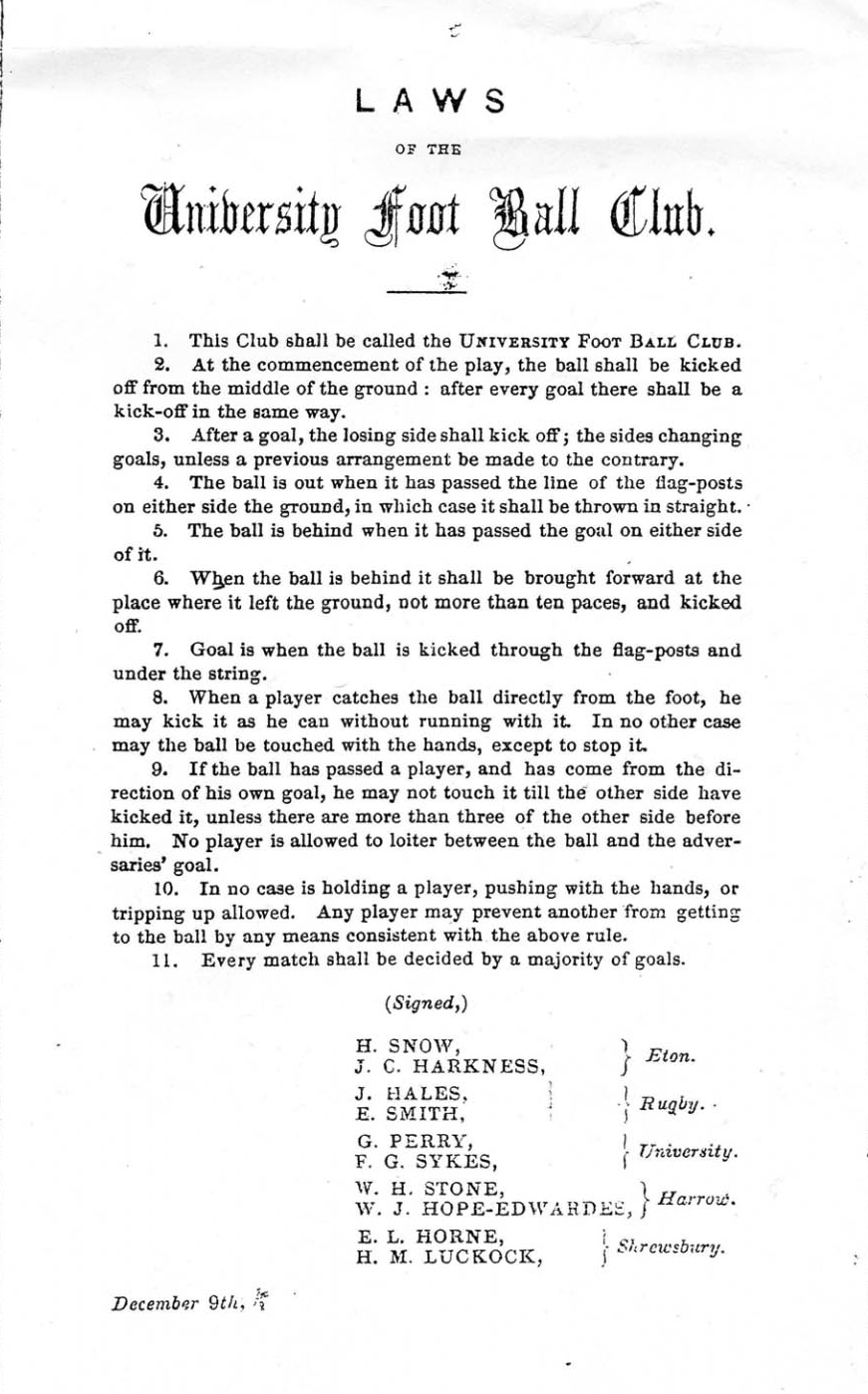
The "Laws of the University Foot Ball Club" (1856)

The Cambridge Rules were several formulations of the rules of football made at the University of Cambridge during the nineteenth century.

Cambridge Rules are believed to have had a significant influence on the modern football codes. The 1863 Cambridge Rules is said to have had a significant influence on the creation of the original Laws of the Game of the Football Association. The earlier 1856 Cambridge Rules are claimed by some to have had an influence in the origins of Australian rules football.

== Context ==
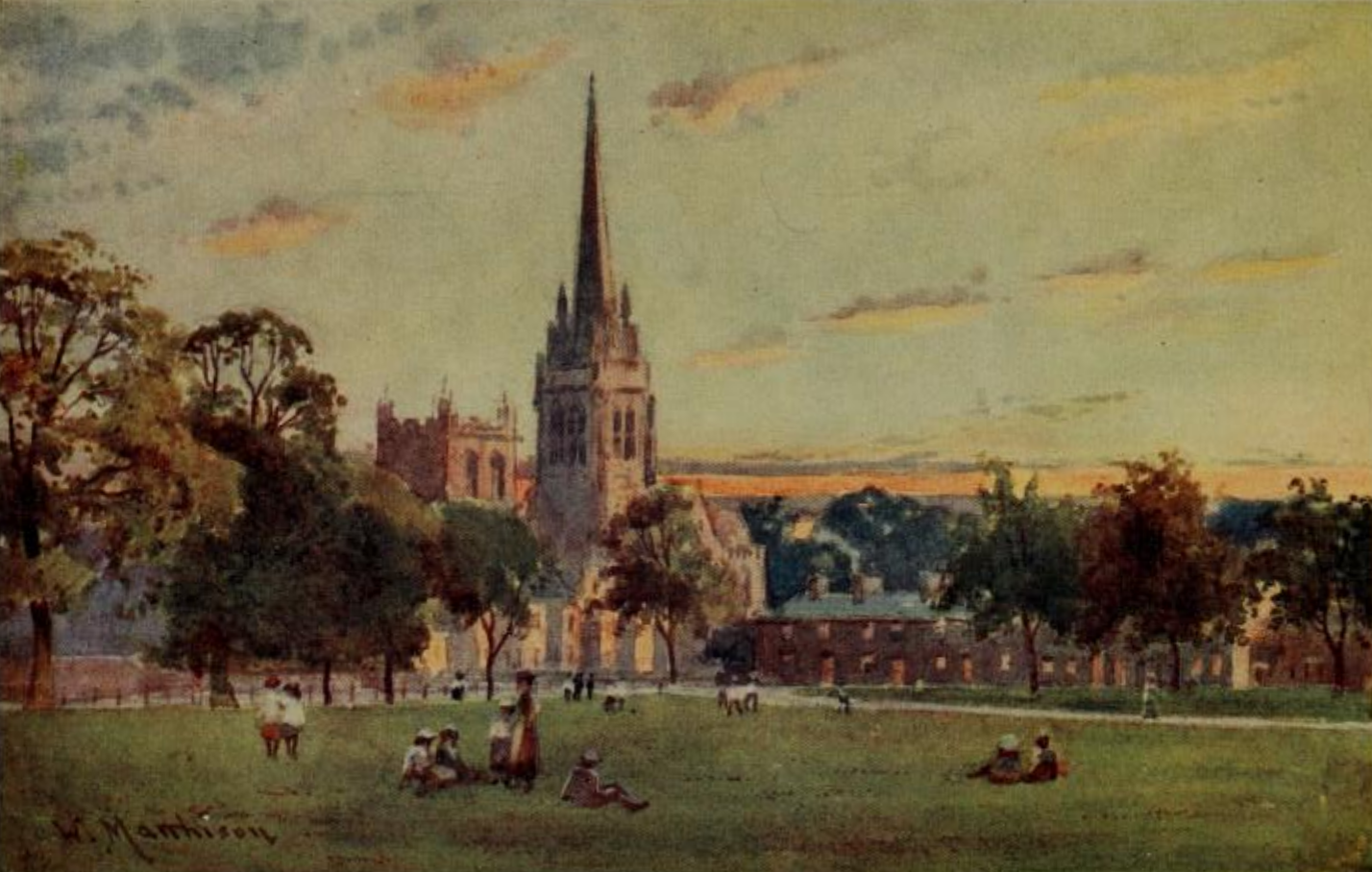
Parker's Piece (1907)

The playing of football has a long history at Cambridge. In 1579, one match played at Chesterton between townspeople and University students ended in a violent brawl that led the Vice-Chancellor to issue a decree forbidding them to play "footeball" outside of college grounds. In 1631 John Barwick, a student at St John's College, broke the collar-bone of a fellow-student while "playing at Football". According to historian Christopher Wordsworth, football "was not, I think, played much in the [eighteenth] century" at the university. There is more evidence of the game in the early part of the nineteenth century. George Elwes Corrie, Master of Jesus College, observed in 1838, "In walking with Willis we passed by Parker's Piece and there saw some forty Gownsmen playing at football. The novelty and liveliness of the scene were amusing!" On the other hand, a former Rugby School pupil, Albert Pell, who attended Trinity College from 1839 to 1841, claimed that "football was unknown" when he arrived at Cambridge, but that he and his companions "established football at Cambridge", using the Rugby rules.

During the early nineteenth century, each school tended to use its own rules of football. These school codes began to be written down in the 1840s, beginning with Rugby School in 1845. When Cambridge students who had attended different schools wished to play each other at football, it was necessary to draw up a compromise set of rules drawing features from the various codes.

== 1838–1842 ==
Edgar Montagu, an old-boy of Shrewsbury School who attended Cambridge from 1838 to 1842, recalled in an 1897 letter: "I and six other representatives of the School made a Club, and drew up rules that should equalise the different game. [...] It was then we had two matches on Parker’s Piece". In a later letter dating from 1899, he wrote: "I was one of seven who drew up the rules for football, when we made the first football club, to be fair to all the schools." The rules have not survived. On the basis of these letters, Curry and Dunning suggest that "the first Cambridge University Football Rules should, at present, be dated tentatively as having been constructed in 1838".

== 1846 ==
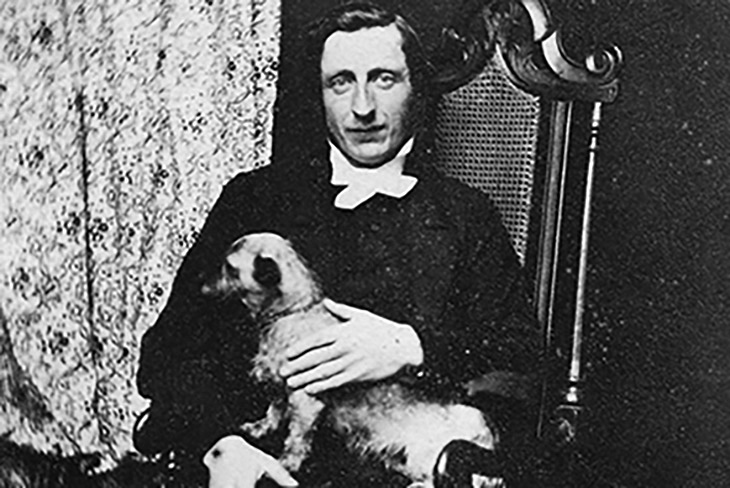
J. C. Thring

According to N. L. Jackson, in 1846 "two old Shrewsbury boys, Messrs. H. de Winton and J. C. Thring, persuaded some Old Etonians to join them and formed a club. Matches were few and far between, but some were played on Parker's Piece. Unfortunately, the game was not popular at the 'Varsity then, and the club did not last long".

Thring himself wrote in 1861: "in 1846, when an attempt was made to introduce a common game, and form a really respectable club, at Cambridge, the Rugby game was found to be the great obstacle to the combination of Eton, Winchester, and Shrewsbury men in forming a football club". No rules from this attempt at codification have survived.

Green describes this development as "the first positive step to create an identity of views and a common code of laws [of football] acceptable to as many as possible", and laments the absence of a plaque "to commemorate this historic moment".

== 1848 ==
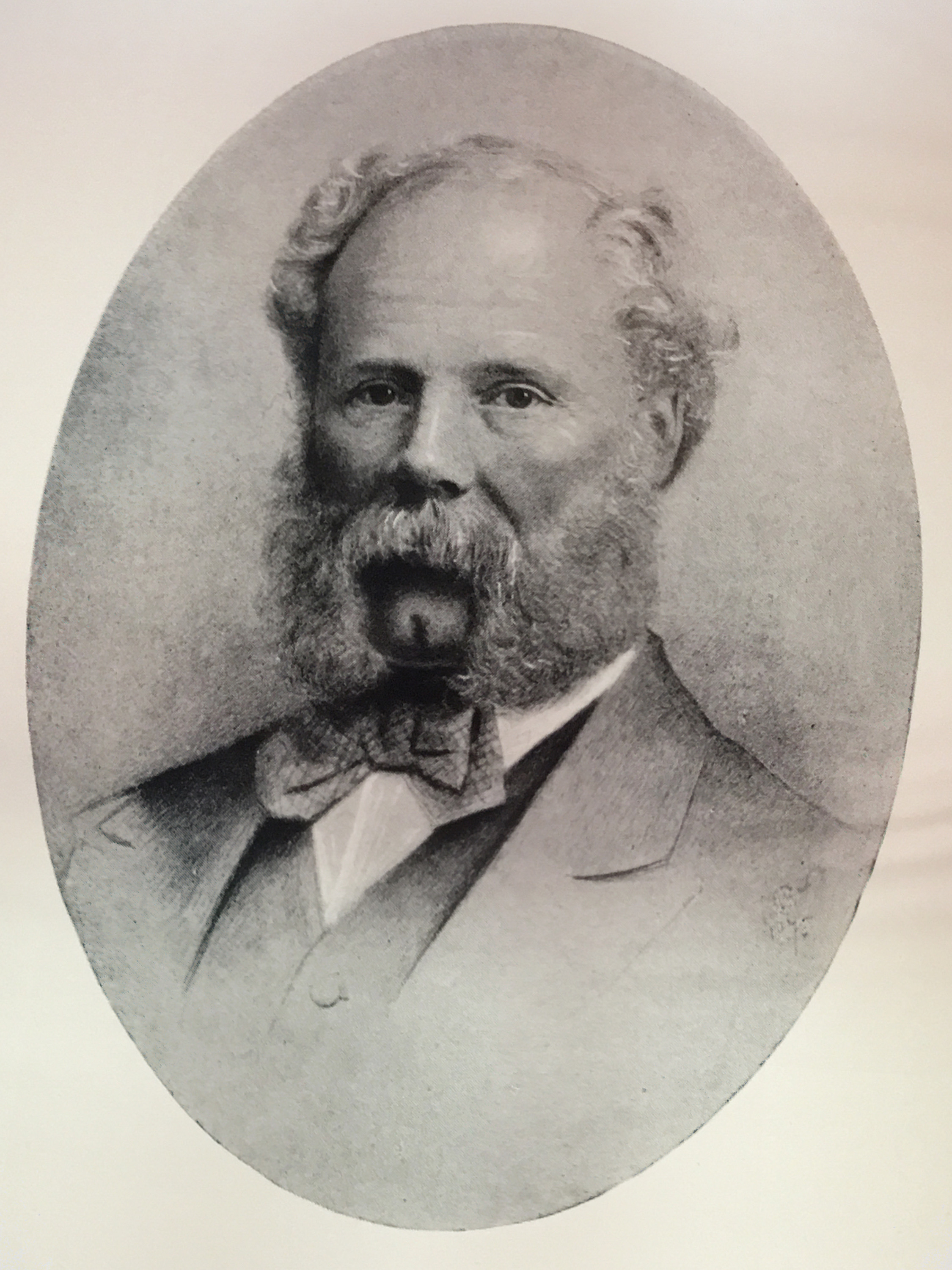
Henry Charles Malden

Henry Charles Malden attended Trinity College between 1847 and 1851. In 1897, he wrote a letter in which he described his memories of creating a set of football rules at Cambridge in 1848. The letter was subsequently published by C. W. Alcock in an 1898 newspaper article:

Before me, as I write, is a letter from Mr Henry C. Malden, of Copse Edge, Godalming, which gives an interesting account of the early efforts to acclimatise football at one of the universities. "Fifty years ago to-day," writes Mr Malden, under date of October 8, 1897, "I went up to Trinity College, Cambridge. In the following year an attempt was made to get up some football, in preference to the hockey then in vogue. But the result was dire confusion, as every man played the rules he had been accustomed to at his public school. I remember how the Eton men howled at the Rugby for handling the ball. So it was agreed that two men should be chosen to represent each of the public schools, and two, who were not public school men, for the 'Varsity. G. Salt and myself were chosen for the 'Varsity. I wish I could remember the others. Burn, of Rugby, was one; Whymper, of Eton, I think, also. We were fourteen in all, I believe. Harrow, Eton, Rugby, Winchester, and Shrewsbury were represented. We met in my rooms after Hall, which in those days was at 4 p.m.; anticipating a long meeting I cleared the tables and provided pens, ink, and paper. Several asked me on coming in whether an exam. was on! Every man brought a copy of his school rules, or knew them by heart, and our progress in framing new rules was slow. On several occasions Salt and I, being unprejudiced, carried or struck out a rule when the voting was equal. We broke up five minutes before midnight. The new rules were printed as the 'Cambridge Rules,' copies were distributed and pasted up on Parker's Piece, and very satisfactorily they worked, for it is right to add that they were loyally kept, and I never heard of any public school man who gave up playing from not liking the rules. Well, sir, years afterwards some one took those rules, still in force at Cambridge, and with very few alterations they became the Association Rules. A fair catch, free kick (as still played at Harrow) was struck out. The off-side rule was made less stringent. 'Hands' was made more so; this has just been wisely altered."

Though the 1848 rules described in Malden's letter have not survived, they have attracted significant interest from historians of the game. Alcock commented that "Mr. Malden's account of the original movement in favour of a uniform code of football is of the greatest interest, from the fact that none has previously seen the light. [...] In any case, it certainly establishes the existence of a unified code fifty years ago". N. L. Jackson, writing in 1899, stated the rules described in Malden's letter "establish[ed] that the Association Game owes its origin to Cambridge University". It has even been suggested that the meeting that produced the 1848 rules "deserves to be remembered as much as [the revolutionary events of the same year in] Frankfurt, Paris, and Kennington Common".

Malden's claim that the 1848 rules worked "very satisfactorily" is doubted by Dunning and Sheard, on the grounds that a new set of rules had to be created in 1856 (see below). Peter Searby also suggests that while "[p]erhaps these [1848] rules were adopted for some games ... the variety of practice that Malden described in fact continued for some time". Searby cites the recollections of T. G. Bonney, who attended St. John's College from 1852 to 1856, that he "often ... played football on Parker's Piece, without uniform or regular organization".

== 1851–54 ==
Another reference to compromise rules appears in the published memoirs of W. C. Green, who attended King's College Cambridge between 1851 and 1854:

There was a Football Club, whose games were played on the Piece, according to rules more like the Eton Field rules than any other. But Rugby and Harrow players would sometimes begin running with the ball in hand or claiming free kicks, which led to some protest and confusion. A Trinity man, Beamont (a Fellow of his College soon after), was a regular attendant, and the rules were revised by him and one or two others, with some concessions to non-Etonians. Few from King's College ever played at this University game: about the end of my time there began to be other special Rugby games on another ground.

== 1856 ==
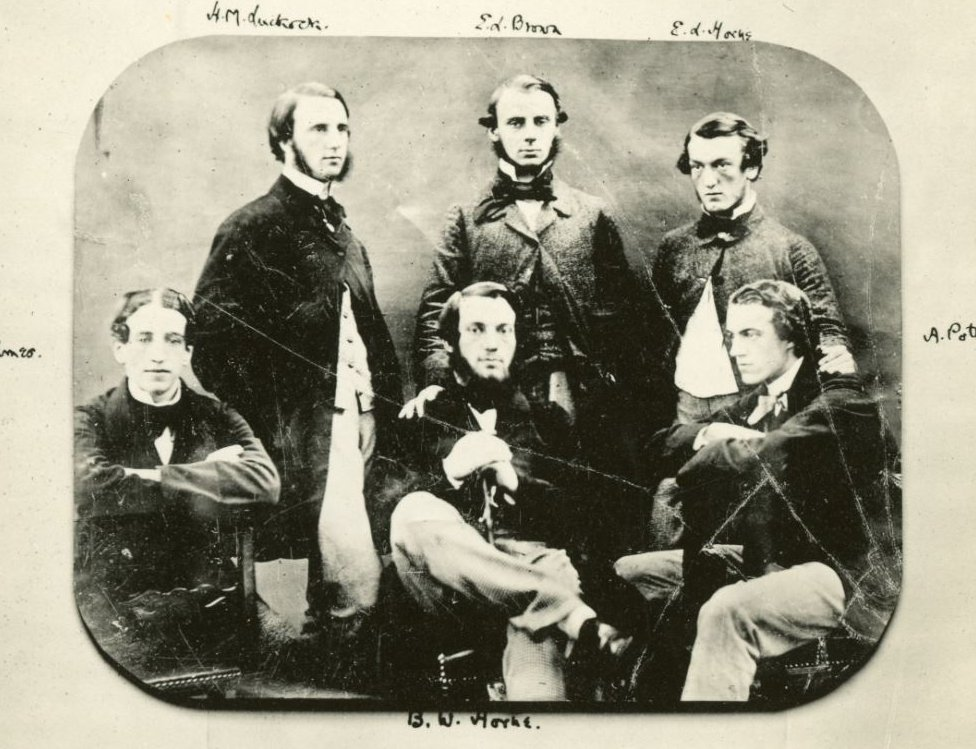
This 1854 portrait includes H. M. Luckock (top left) and E. L. Horne (top right), two of the creators of the 1856 Cambridge Rules

In 1856, there was another attempt to draw up common rules. Frederic G. Sykes, who attended St John's College between 1853 and 1857, described their creation in an 1897 letter published in a magazine for St John's College alumni:

The Laws were drawn up in the Michaelmas Term of 1856, I believe. The meeting took place in W. H. Stone's rooms in Trinity College. Up to that time University Football consisted in a sort of general melée on Parker's Piece, from 1.30 to 3.30 p.m. [...] There were no rules. [...] When we met in sufficient numbers we chose two sides, and stragglers adopted the weaker side, or did as requested. The hand was freely used, everyone adopting his own view, until a crisis was reached in 1856, resulting in the drawing up of these rules. I never heard of an accident, and though the game was played vigorously, there was no violence, the ball being the objective, not the persons of the players. [...] Do you think, (as I do) that the enclosed Laws may be regarded as the nucleus of the Association game? At that time football was played only in Schools and at the Universities, so that it did not then generally exist. There were no laws at Cambridge, whatever Oxford had. Different schools had their own rules, which had never been subjected to amalgamation. Each had its own. The enclosed rules seem to be the first attempt at combination, and from this point of view perhaps they led up to the Association rules.

Sykes was unaware of any compromise rules earlier than his own 1856 code (which he suggests might be "the first attempt at combination") and stated that before their enactment "University Football" had "no rules". Curry and Dunning suggest that "[t]he regularity with which new rules were issued at [Cambridge] indicates a probable lack of effectiveness in the 'laws'".

A copy of the 1856 Cambridge Rules survives at Shrewsbury School: another copy, dated from 1857, was included by Sykes with his letter. The rules bear the signatures of ten footballers: two each from Eton, Rugby, Harrow, Shrewsbury, and the University of Cambridge. The rules allow a free kick from a fair catch; otherwise the ball may be handled only to stop it. Holding, pushing, and tripping are all forbidden. The offside rule requires four opponents to be between a player and the opponents' goal. A goal is scored by kicking the ball "through the flag posts and under the string".

=== Use outside Cambridge ===
In 1861, Forest Football Club (which would later become Wanderers F.C.), issued a set of printed laws based on the Cambridge rules of 1856 with a small number of additions. A notice, issued by the same club in September 1862, sought opponents for the upcoming season who would play "on the rules of the University of Cambridge".

== 1862 ==
In November 1862, a football match took place at Cambridge between a team of Old Etonians and a team of Old Harrovians. A set of rules, drawn up specifically for this match by a committee, mixed features of the Eton and Harrow rules, while being shorter and simpler than either:

- all handling (other than "stopping" the ball) was forbidden, as in the Eton Field Game
- the dimensions of the ground, the width of the goals, and the terminology "bases" for goals, followed Harrow rules
- a player was offside unless four opponents were between him and the opponents' goal, as at Eton
- when the ball went out of play, the game was restarted with a kick-in, as at Harrow

The complexities of Eton's "rouge" tie-breaker and Harrow's free-kick for a fair catch were both excluded from the rules for this game, which ended in a draw.

== 1863 ==
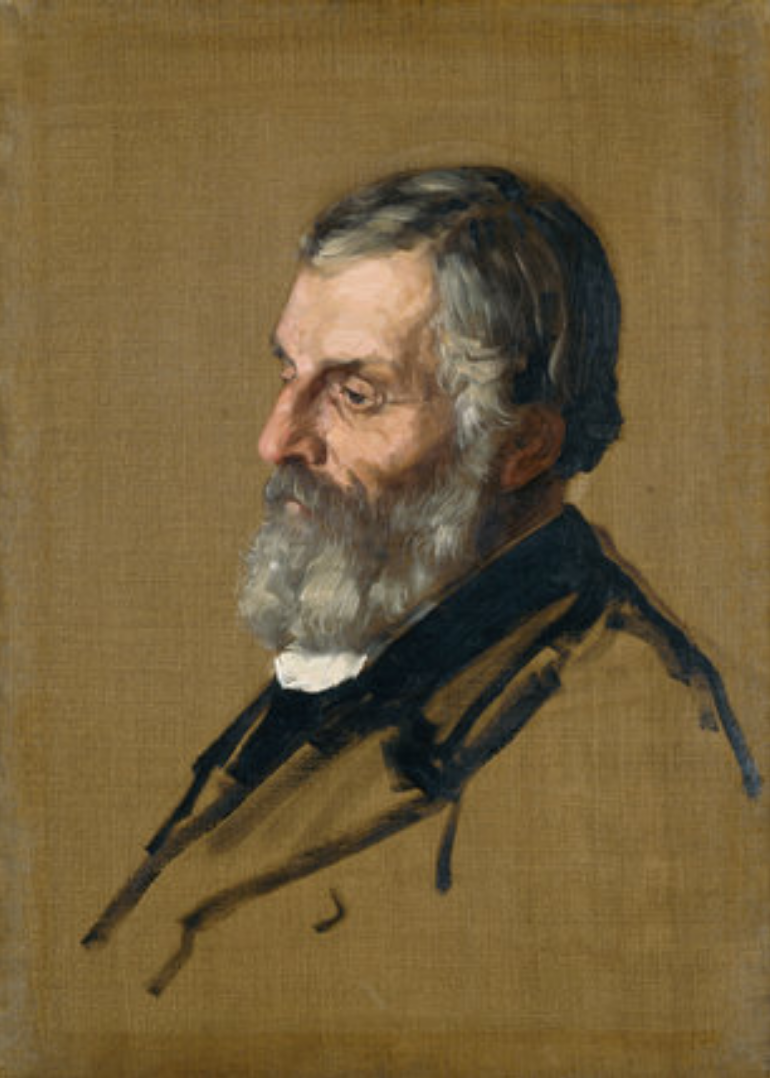
Robert Burn, chair of the committee that wrote the 1863 rules

In October 1863, a new set of rules was drawn up by a committee of nine players representing Shrewsbury, Eton, Rugby, Marlborough, Harrow, and Westminster schools. The following month, it was published in the newspapers, with an introduction stating:

It having been thought desirable to establish a general game for the University of Cambridge, the accompanying rules have been drawn up for that purpose. The first game will be played on Friday, 20 Nov, at 2:15 p.m. on Parker's Piece. All members of the University who take an interest in the game, and are desirous of attending, can do so on payment of a subscription of one shilling per term.

Like the earlier 1856 laws, the 1863 rules disallowed rugby-style running with the ball and hacking. Nevertheless, there were several differences between the two codes:

- The 1856 laws had a "string" below which the ball had to go to score a goal, while the 1863 laws permitted a goal to be scored at any height.
- The 1856 laws permitted players to catch the ball, with a free kick awarded for a fair catch, while the 1863 laws forbade this (both codes allowed the ball to be handled to "stop" it).
- The 1856 laws permitted a player to be onside when there were four opponents between him and the opponents' goal-line, while the 1863 laws had a strict offside law whereby any player ahead of the ball was out of play.
- The 1856 laws awarded a throw-in when the ball went out of play over the side lines, while the 1863 laws used a kick-in.
- The 1863 laws awarded a free kick from 25 yards after a touch-down behind the opponent's' goal-line (somewhat similar to a conversion in present-day rugby), while the 1856 laws did not.

There is little textual similarity between the two sets of laws: in general the 1863 laws are longer and more detailed, but the 1856 rule that "[e]very match shall be decided by a majority of goals" has no equivalent in the later code.

The Field published a detailed report of a game played under these rules on Tuesday 1 December 1863. The author concluded that while "[w]e do not consider [the Cambridge rules] the best game that might be had, [...] it is a good one", and suggested that it could be adopted by some of the schools.

=== Influence on the Football Association laws ===
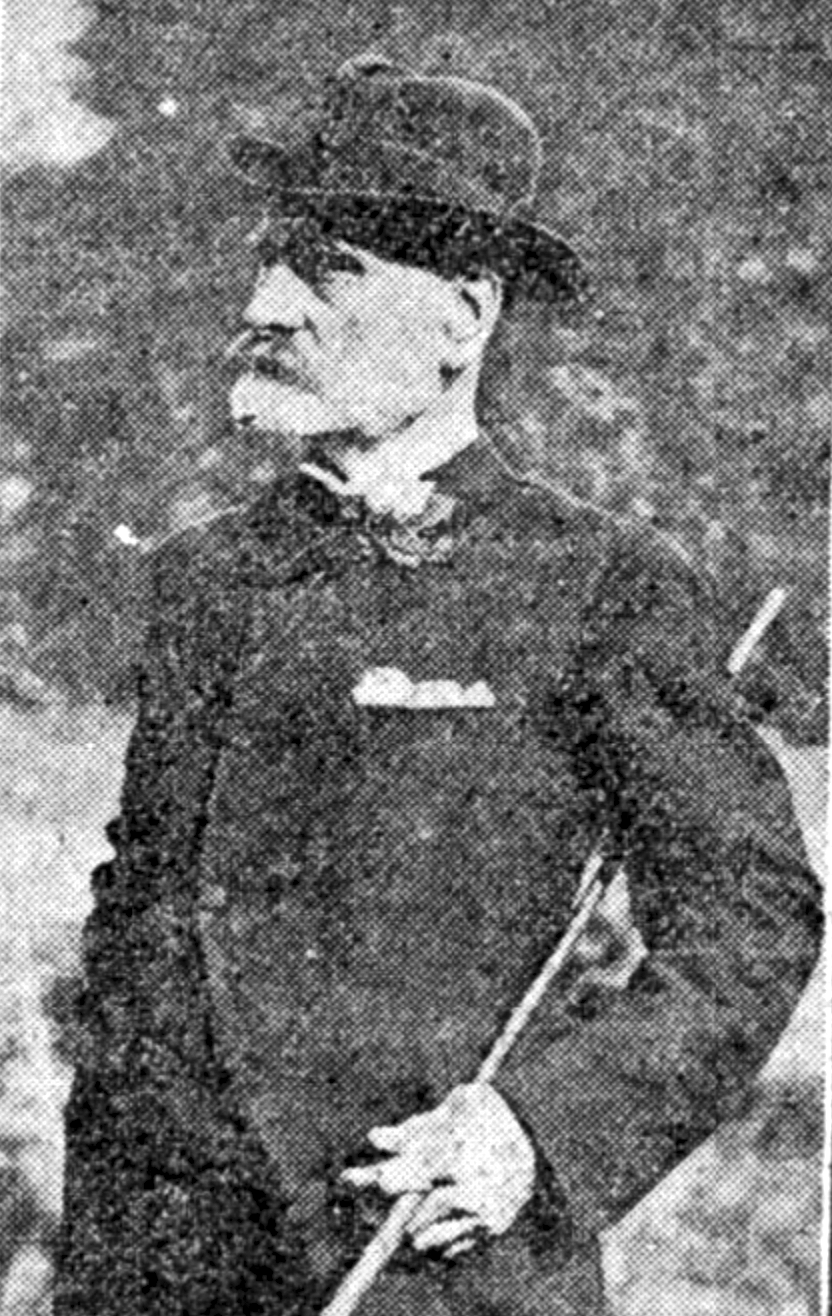
Ebenezer Morley brought the 1863 Cambridge rules to the attention of the Football Association

The publication of the 1863 Cambridge rules happened to coincide with the debates within the newly formed Football Association (FA) over its own first set of laws. At this time, some football clubs followed the example of Rugby School by allowing the ball to be carried in the hands, with players allowed to "hack" (kick in the shins) opponents who were carrying the ball. Other clubs forbade both practices. During the meetings to draw up the FA laws, there was an acrimonious division between the "hacking" and "non-hacking" clubs.

An FA meeting of 17 November 1863 discussed this question, with the "hacking" clubs predominating. A further meeting was scheduled one week later in order to finalize ("settle") the laws. The Cambridge Rules appeared in the sporting newspapers on 21 November, three days before the FA meeting.

At this crucial 24 November meeting, the "hackers" were again in a narrow majority. During the meeting, however, FA secretary Ebenezer Morley brought the delegates' attention to the Cambridge Rules (which banned carrying and hacking):

Mr Morley, hon. secretary, said that he had endeavoured as faithfully as he could to draw up the laws according to the suggestions made, but he wished to call the attention of the meeting to other matters that had taken place. The Cambridge University Football Club, probably stimulated by the Football Association, had formed some laws in which gentlemen of note from six of the public schools had taken part. Those rules, so approved, were entitled to the greatest consideration and respect at the hands of the association, and they ought not to pass them over without giving them all the weight that the feeling of six of the public schools entitled them to.

Discussion of the Cambridge rules, and suggestions for possible communication with Cambridge on the subject, served to delay the final "settlement" of the laws to a further meeting, on 1 December. A number of representatives who supported rugby-style football did not attend this additional meeting, resulting in hacking and carrying being banned. As the newspaper report of a later meeting put it, 'the appearance of some rules recently adopted at Cambridge seemed to give tacit support to the advocates of "non-hacking".'

The FA adopted the Cambridge offside law almost verbatim, replacing the quite different wording in the earlier draft. Morley even proposed making the FA's laws "nearly identical with the Cambridge rules", but this suggestion was rebuffed by FA president Arthur Pember. As a result, the FA's final published laws of 1863 retained many of the differences from the Cambridge rules that had been present in the earlier draft, including the following:

- The FA laws allowed the ball to be caught, and awarded a free-kick for a fair catch; the Cambridge rules banned all handling except to stop the ball.
- The FA laws awarded a throw-in when the ball went into touch, while the Cambridge rules awarded a kick-in.
- The FA laws provided for a change of ends every time a goal was scored, while the Cambridge rules stipulated that ends should only be changed at half-time.

The historical significance of these distinctions was, however, minor in comparison to the decision to reject hacking and carrying the ball. Jonathan Wilson has summarized it thus:

[C]arrying the ball was outlawed, and [association] football and rugby went their separate ways.

== 1867 ==
Cambridge University Football Club continued to play according to its own rules. In March 1867, it summoned a meeting of "representatives of public schools and college football clubs" at which it was hoped that "Oxford would agree with Cambridge in adopting a common set of rules", with the intention that these rules "would in time become widely adopted throughout the country". Curry and Dunning suggest that Cambridge's decision to revise its own set of rules, rather than using those of the FA, reflects "the relative weakness of the FA at that time". The resulting set of rules, explicitly presented as a revision of the 1863 rules, included a "touch down", somewhat similar to today's "try" in rugby: a team who touched the ball down behind the opponent's goal-line were entitled to take a free kick at goal, with the number of unconverted "touches down" being used as a tie-breaker if both teams scored the same number of goals.

== Subsequent developments ==
In 1869, the Cambridge club wrote to the FA to propose a match between the two bodies. It insisted on playing its own rules, a condition to which the FA would not agree.

In 1871, the break between the two main codes of football was crystallized with the formation of the Rugby Football Union (RFU). This was followed in 1872 by the founding of the Cambridge Rugby Union Club, following RFU rules. Shorn of adherents of the "carrying game", the Cambridge University Football Club joined the FA in 1873. It played under FA rules when it took part in the third edition of the FA Cup, in the 1873-4 season.

== Recognition ==
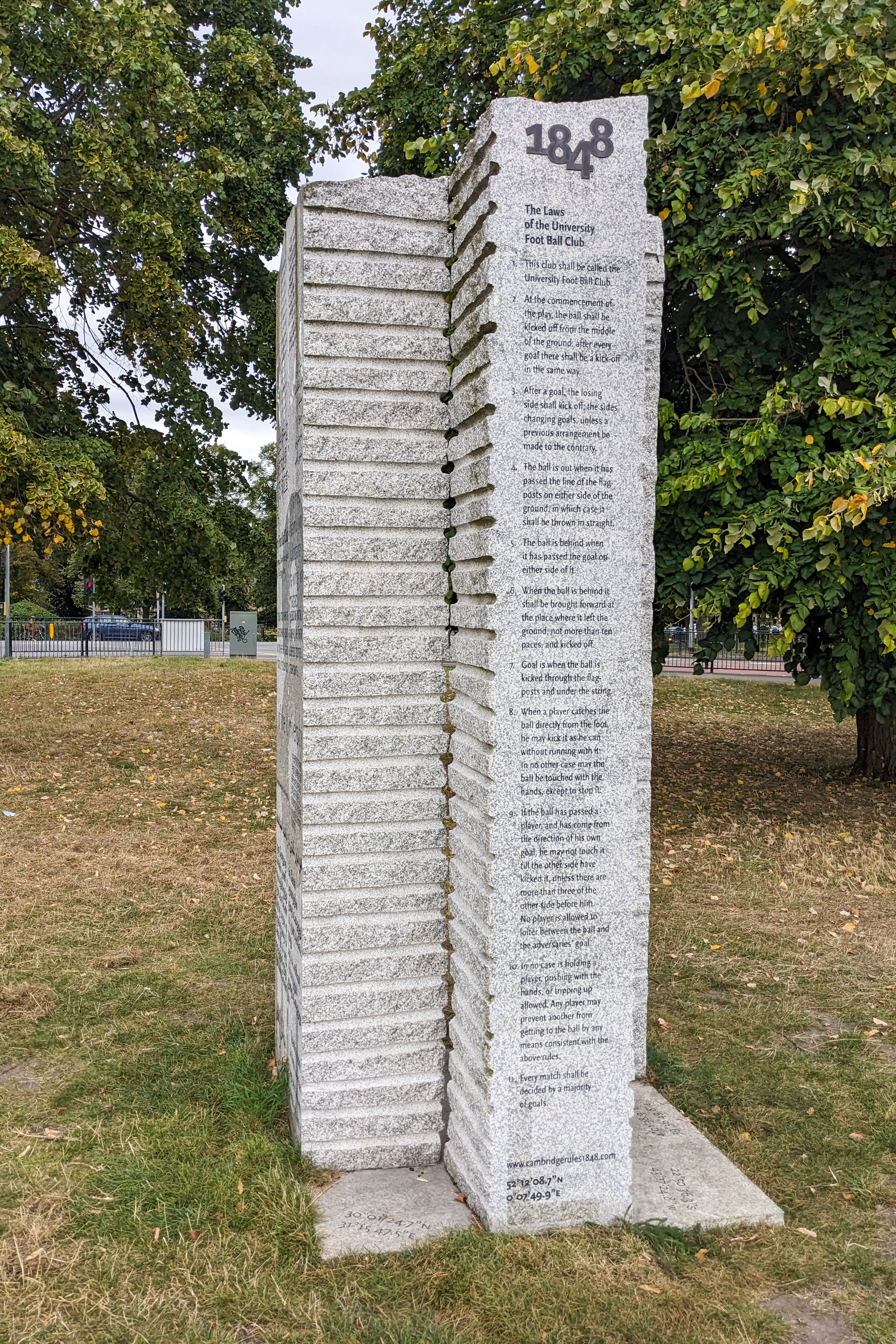
The "Cambridge Rules 1848" monument on Parker's Piece

In 2000, a plaque was erected in Parker's Piece by a football team consisting of homeless people. It bears the following inscription:

Here on Parker's Piece, in the 1800s, students established a common set of simple football rules emphasising skill above force, which forbade catching the ball and 'hacking'. These 'Cambridge Rules' became the defining influence on the 1863 Football Association rules.

In May 2018, a monument titled "Cambridge Rules 1848" was installed on Parker's Piece. The monument consists of four stone pillars, engraved with the 1856 Cambridge Rules translated into several languages.

== Summary ==
Laws of football reportedly created at Cambridge up to 1867
Date	Survives today?	Public school(s) involved	Cambridge college(s) involved	Source(s)	Notes
c. 1838–1842	No	Shrewsbury	Gonville and Caius	Edgar Montagu (letters of 1897 and 1899)	Although drawn up solely by Shrewsbury alumni, the rules were intended to be "fair to all the schools".
1846	No	Eton; Shrewsbury; Rugby; Winchester	St John's; Trinity	J. C. Thring (article of 1861); N. L. Jackson (1899)	The sources do not make it clear whether this attempt to create a code of rules was successful: "the Rugby game was found to be the great obstacle to the combination of Eton, Winchester, and Shrewsbury men in forming a football club".
1848	No	Eton; Harrow; Rugby; Shrewsbury; Winchester	Trinity [others unknown]	H. C. Malden (letter of 1897)	Malden claims that these rules were "still in force at Cambridge" when the FA's rules were created in 1863.
c. 1851–1854	No	Eton "Non-Etonians"	Trinity [others unknown]	W. C. Green (published memoir of 1905)	Rules were "more like the Eton Field rules than any other"
1856	Yes	Eton; Harrow; Rugby; Shrewsbury	Clare; Jesus; Peterhouse; St John's; Trinity	Copy preserved in Shrewsbury library (c. 1856); F. G. Sykes (published letter of 1897)	Sykes states that before this code was created, university football was a "general melée" with "no rules". He suggests that these rules might be "the first attempt at combination".
1862	Yes	Eton; Harrow	Trinity [others unknown]	Letter of J. A. Cruikshank to the Old Harrovian magazine The Tyro (October 1863)	Rules were specially created for a match between old Etonians and old Harrovians at Cambridge in November 1862
1863	Yes	Eton; Harrow; Marlborough; Rugby; Shrewsbury; Westminster	Gonville and Caius; Trinity	Published contemporaneously in newspapers (1863)	Influenced the first FA rules
1867	Yes	Charterhouse; Cheltenham; Eton; Harrow; Marlborough; Rugby; Shrewsbury; Uppingham; Westminster; Winchester	Christ's; Emmanuel; Gonville and Caius; Jesus; St. John's; Trinity	Published contemporaneously in newspapers (1867)	Explicitly presented as a revision of the 1863 laws

== See also ==
- English public school football games
- Laws of the Game (association football)
- Sheffield Rules
- University and college sport
