= Legal Adviser to the Home Office =

Senior government lawyer and the chief legal adviser to the U.K. Home Office

The Legal Adviser to the Home Office is a senior government lawyer and the chief legal adviser to the Home Office. The office was formally established in 1933, but older offices with similar functions date back to the early nineteenth century.

== History ==
After 1824, the Home Office employed parliamentary draftsmen, but not in a formal position, to prepare and improve criminal law. William Gregson was employed continuously between 1826 and 1833 in this capacity and received annual payments. His employment ended in 1833 and two years later the Treasury agreed to find funds for a permanent Parliamentary Counsel, whose office had a salary fixed at £1,200; this was incorporated into the Home Office in 1837. However the office was abolished in 1869 and its incumbent, Henry Thring, was appointed First Parliamentary Counsel to the Treasury.

The Home Secretary, Gathorne Gathorne-Hardy, felt that the office needed its own permanent legal adviser and Godfrey Lushington was appointed Counsel to the Home Office. In 1876, he was promoted to Legal Assistant Under-Secretary. In that office, he was succeeded by Sir Edward Leigh-Pemberton, who retired in 1894, who was in turn succeeded by Sir Henry Cunynghame. In 1913, Ernley Blackwell was appointed as Cunynghame's replacement, and served until 1933. When Blackwell retired, the Home Office's senior civil servants took the opportunity to reorganise the department, and replaced his office with that of the Legal Adviser (with the rank of Under-Secretary), the first of whom was Sir Oscar Dowson. This has been considered the foundation of the current office.

== Office-holders ==
Legal advisers have included:

- 1869–1876: Godfrey Lushington (as Counsel).
- 1876–1885: Godfrey Lushington (as Legal Assistant Under-Secretary).
- 1885–1894: Edward Leigh Pemberton (as Legal Assistant Under-Secretary; later KCB)
- 1894–1913: Sir Henry Hardinge Samuel Cunynghame (as Legal Assistant Under-Secretary)
- 1913–1933: Sir Ernley Blackwell (as Legal Assistant Under-Secretary)
- 1933–1946: Sir Oscar Follett Dowson
- 1947–1956: Sir Leslie Brass
- 1956–1977: Sir John Kenneth Trevor Jones
- 1977–1983: John Douglas Semken
- 1983–1988: James Nursaw
- 1988–1992: Anthony Hilgrove Hammond
- 1992–1995: Michael Lawrence Saunders
- 1995–1997: David Edgar Joseph Nissen
- 1997–2000: Juliet Wheldon
- 2000–2012: David Seymour
- 2012–2014: Jonathan Jones (also Director General, Legal).
- 2014–present: Peter James Reginald Fish (also Director General, Legal).
