= Harrow High School =

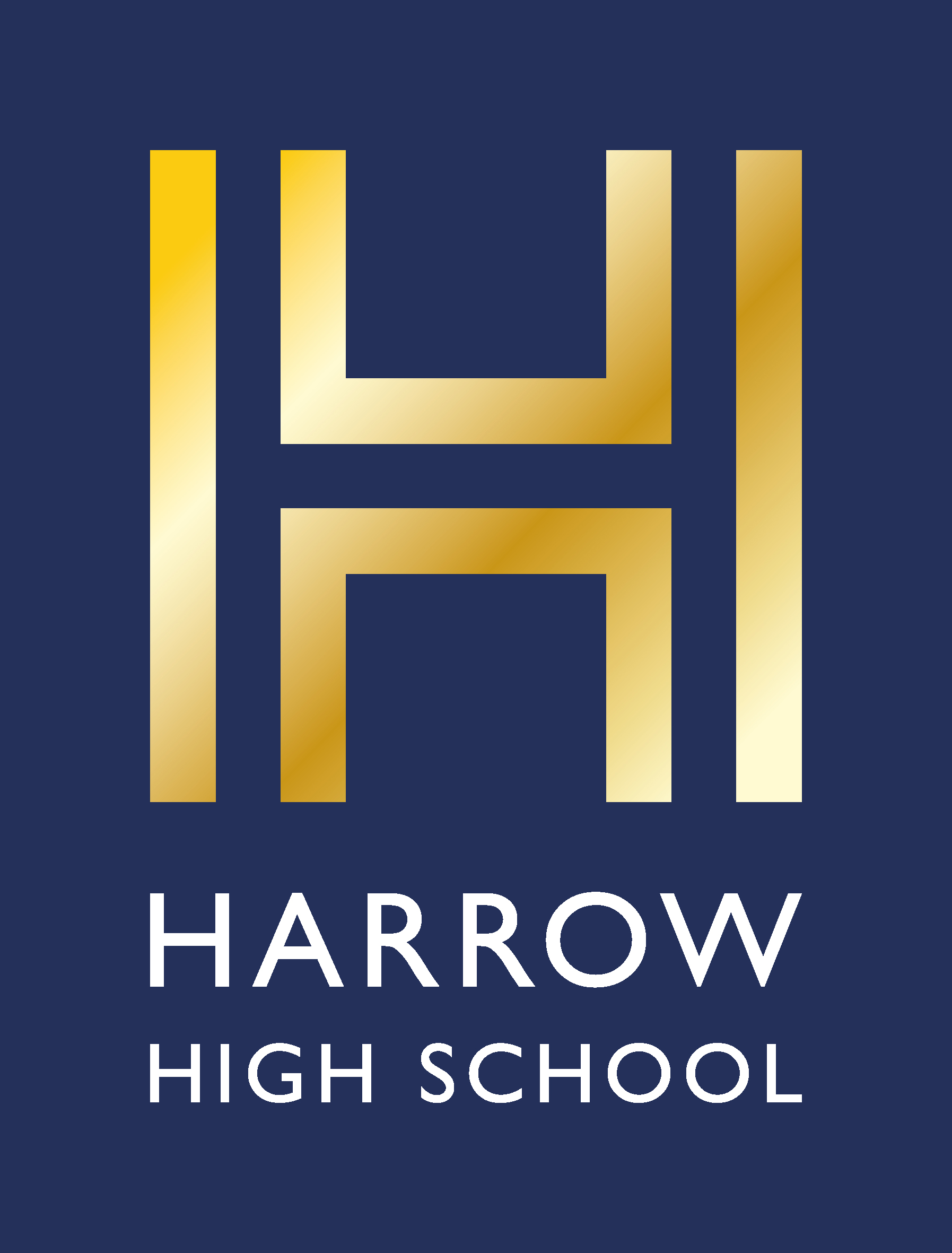
- Harrow High School badge

Location
- Gayton Road; Harrow, Greater London, HA1 2JG; England; 51°34′50″N 0°19′39″W

Information
- Type: Academy
- Established: October 1911; 114 years ago
- Department for Education URN: 137177 Tables
- Ofsted: Reports
- Headmaster: Paul Gamble
- Gender: Co-educational
- Age: 11 to 18
- Enrolment: 824
- Former pupils: Old Gaytonians
- Website: www.harrowhigh.com

Harrow High School is a co-educational academy in the London Borough of Harrow and a specialist Sports College. It was previously called Gayton High School and Harrow County School for Boys. The school has a sixth form for post-16 studies part of the Harrow Sixth Form Collegiate. There was an independent school with the same name on a nearby site until the late 1980s.

== History ==
Harrow County School for Boys crest.

The school was formerly Harrow County School for Boys, a grammar school. In 1975, when the London Borough of Harrow adopted the comprehensive system of education, it was renamed Gayton High School (after its address on Gayton Road); it remained an all-boys school.

In 1998, the school became coeducational and changed its name to Harrow High School.

=== Academy ===
On 1 August 2011, Harrow High School officially gained academy status.

=== Independent school ===
The name "Harrow High School" had formerly belonged to an independent school which, until its closure in the late 1980s, occupied a site across the road from the current school.

== Old Gaytonians Association (OGA) ==
The Old Gaytonians Association gained its first two members in October 1911 but the association was officially established on 27 September 1912. It was closed on 30 September 2016.

It was named after the school publication of the same name, this name was chosen because the school site was on 'Gayton Road'.

== Notable Old Gaytonians ==
=== Harrow County School for Boys ===
The following were educated at the then Harrow County School for Boys:

- Peter Ackroyd, Biblical scholar
- Clive Anderson, comedy writer and broadcaster
- Kenneth Bagshawe, emeritus professor of medical oncology, Charing Cross Hospital
- John Boothman, air officer commanding-in-chief RAF Coastal Command 1953–1956, and outright winner of the Schneider Trophy in the Supermarine S6B, 1931
- Donald Box, Conservative MP for Cardiff North 1959–66
- Sydney Caine, director, London School of Economics 1957–1967
- Horace Cutler, leader Greater London Council 1977–1981
- Nicholas de Lange, professor of Hebrew and Jewish studies, University of Cambridge
- Robert Dell, Archdeacon of Derby 1973-1992
- Geoff Egan, archaeologist and small finds expert
- Kel Fidler, vice-chancellor of University of Northumbria 2001–2008, and chairman of the Engineering Council 2005–2011
- Andrew Findon, flautist
- C. Robin Ganellin, emeritus professor of medicinal chemistry, University College London
- Roger Glover, musician
- Carl Jackson, director of music at the Chapel Royal, Hampton Court 1996-2025
- Paul Jenkins, formerly HM Procurator General, Treasury Solicitor and head of the Government Legal Service
- Robin Leach, actor & broadcaster
- Leigh Lewis, former permanent secretary, Department for Work and Pensions
- Donald McMorran, architect
- Roger Mercer, archaeologist, and president, Society of Antiquaries of Scotland 2005–2008
- Beric Morley, former teacher at the school
- Derek Morris, former chairman of the Competition Commission; provost, Oriel College, Oxford
- Simon Napier-Bell, music manager and record producer
- Stephen Norrington, film director, Blade and The League of Extraordinary Gentlemen
- Paul Nurse, 2001 Nobel Prize in Physiology or Medicine; president, Royal Society 2010–2015, 2025-
- Paul Oliver, architectural historian and writer on the blues and other forms of African-American music.
- Geoffrey Perkins, writer, and former head of comedy, BBC Television
- Geoffrey Pinnington, editor of The People 1972–82
- Michael Portillo, journalist and broadcaster, former Conservative politician and Cabinet Minister
- Alan Reece owner director, Pearson Engineering Ltd
- Andrew Ritchie, commandant, Royal Military Academy Sandhurst 2003–2006
- Cardew Robinson, comic
- Philip Sallon (b. 1951), club promoter, event organiser, socialite, style innovator, impresario, and clothing designer. He was born in London, England. He is particularly known for being a prominent member of the Punk sub-cultural and New Romantic pop cultural movements during the 1970s and 1980s.
- Nigel Sheinwald, British ambassador to the United States 2007–2012
- Anthony Smith, director, British Film Institute 1979–1988; president, Magdalen College, Oxford 1988–2005.
- Stephen South, Formula Three driver
- Jamie Stewart, musician, The Cult
- Martin Walker, editor-in-chief emeritus, UPI
- Martin Townsend, journalist and former editor of the Sunday Express
- Anthony Young, Baron Young of Norwood Green, former deputy general secretary, Communication Workers Union; former governor, BBC; formerly Parliamentary Under Secretary of State for Postal Affairs and Employment Relations, Department for Business, Innovation and Skills

=== Gayton High School ===
- Angus Fraser, cricketer
- Mark Ramprakash, cricketer
- Jitesh Gadhia, investment banker
- Rishi Rich, International Music producer
- Nick Webster, soccer coach, writer, TV personality

=== Harrow High School ===
- Marvin Sordell, former footballer who played for Watford, Burton Albion and England Under-21s
- Ben Davis, footballer for Fulham F.C. and Thailand under-23s

== Bibliography ==
- May, Trevor. "The History of the Harrow County School for Boys". Harrow: Harrow County School for Boys, 1975 ISBN 0-9504535-0-1, 199p.
- "Golden Jubilee Book, 1911–1961". Farnham Common: R. G. Baker & Co., 1961, 124p.
- "The Gaytonian: The magazine of the County School, Harrow". 1911–1975.
