= Geoff Egan =

British archaeologist

Geoff Egan FSA
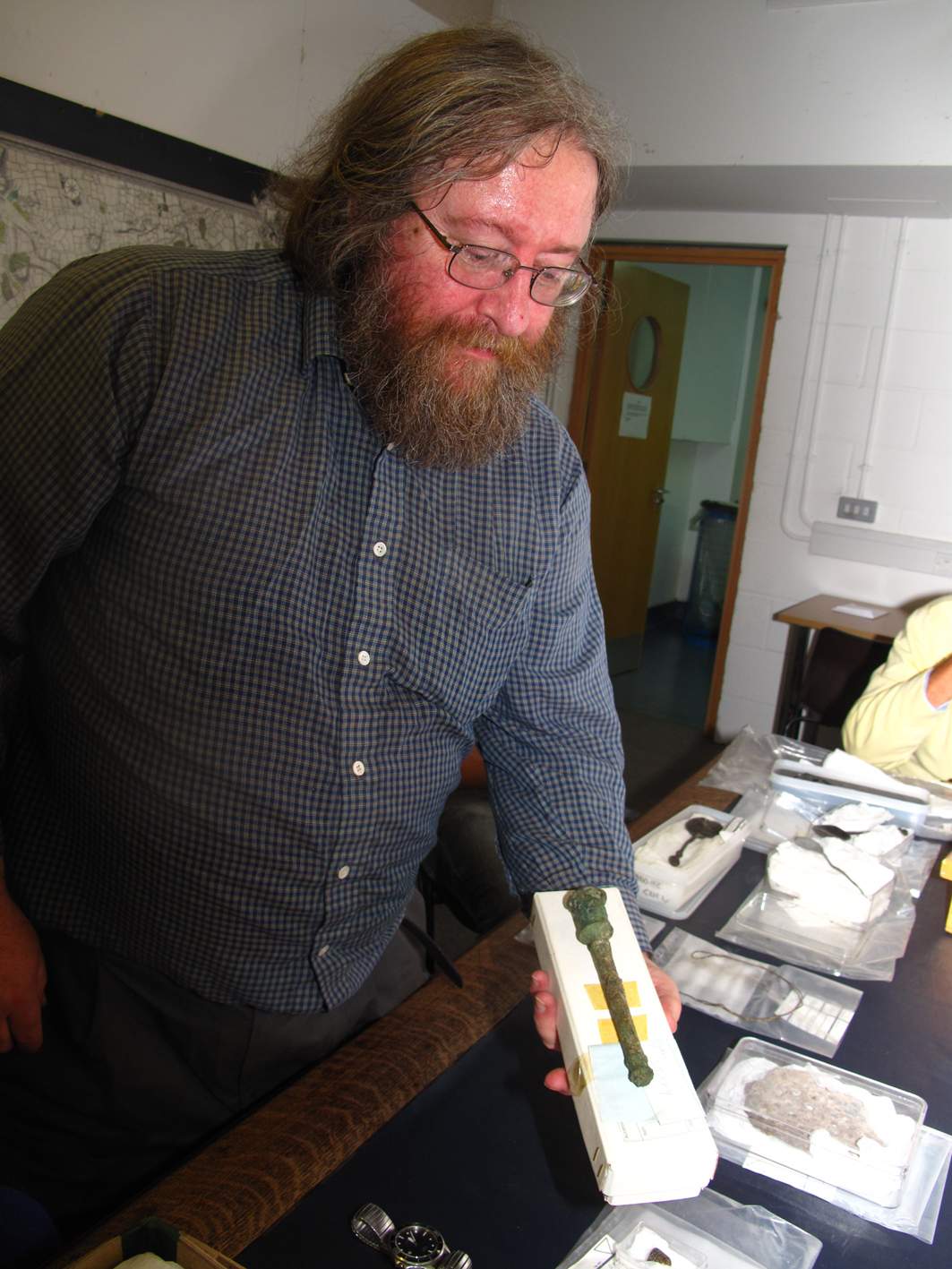
- Egan with a table of archaeological finds in 2009
- Born: 19 October 1951
- Died: 24 December 2010 (aged 59)

Academic background
- Education: Harrow County School for Boys
- Alma mater: Peterhouse, Cambridge; University of London

Academic work
- Discipline: Archaeologist
- Sub-discipline: Archaeological artifacts; small finds; archaeology of London; medieval archaeology; post-medieval archaeology
- Institutions: Museum of London; Museum of London Archaeology; British Museum; Portable Antiquities Scheme

Geoffrey Egan, FSA (19 October 1951 – 24 December 2010) was a British archaeologist, medievalist and small finds expert. He spent the majority of his career as an archaeologist with the Museum of London's Department of Urban Archaeology (later Museum of London Archaeology), rising from a field archaeologist to a fieldwork director and then a finds specialist. From 2004 to his death, on secondment to the British Museum, he was the national finds adviser on early medieval to post-medieval finds for the Portable Antiquities Scheme.

== Early life and education ==
Egan was born on 19 October 1951 in Wembley or Harrow, London, England. He was educated at Harrow County School for Boys, an all-boys grammar school in Harrow. He then matriculated into Peterhouse, Cambridge, first studying classics before switching to the joint archaeology and anthropology degree. He graduated from the University of Cambridge with a Bachelor of Arts (BA) degree in 1976.

In 1988, he was awarded a Doctor of Philosophy (PhD) degree by the University of London for a doctoral thesis titled "Provenanced leaden cloth seals".

== Career ==
Egan spent some time following graduation working at Kew Gardens, but, after travelling to Norway, he joined the archaeological excavation in Trondheim and decided to make archaeology his career. In 1976, he joined the Museum of London, and worked for its archaeology service as a specialist in medieval and later non-ceramic finds. He dedicated his research to the archaeology of medieval and post-medieval periods, which in the 1970s were considered the realm of historians. He also pioneered the liaising of the Museum with the mudlarks, people who scavenge for archaeological finds on the Thames foreshore, from the 1970s onwards. This would lead to the book Toys, trifles & trinkets based on a collection donated to the museum by mudlark Tony Pilson. In 2004, he was also on part time secondment to the British Museum, to be the national finds adviser on early medieval to post-medieval finds for its Portable Antiquities Scheme. In July 2010, the appointment became a permanent full-time position.

In 1982, he joined the council of the Society of Post-Medieval Archaeology (SPMA). In 2005, he was elected president of the SPMA, serving a three year term until 2008. In May 2009, he was elected master of the Worshipful Company of Arts Scholars.

== Personal life ==
Having suffered a coronary thrombosis, Egan died on 24 December 2010, aged 59. His funeral was held on 14 January and a memorial service was also held for him at the British Museum on 24 March 2011.

== Selected works ==
- Egan, Geoff (1996). Playthings From the Past: Lead Alloy Miniature Artefacts c. 1300-1800. Jonathan Horne Publications.
- Egan, Geoff (1995). Lead cloth seals and related items in the British Museum. London: Department of Medieval and Later Antiquities, British Museum. ISBN 978-0861590933.
- Egan, Geoff (1998). The medieval household: daily living c. 1150 - c. 1450. Medieval Finds From Excavations in London. Vol. 6. London: Stationery Office. ISBN 9780112904908.
- Egan, Geoff; Pritchard, Frances (2004). Dress accessories: c. 1150 - c. 1450. London: Boydell Press. ISBN 978-0851158396.
- Forsyth, Hazel; Egan, Geoff (2005). Toys, trifles & trinkets: base-metal miniatures from London 1200 to 1800. London: Unicorn Press. ISBN 0906290740.
- Egan, Geoff (2005). Material culture in London in an age of transition: Tudor and Stuart period finds c. 1450- c. 1700 from excavations at riverside sites in Southwark. London: Museum of London archaeology service. ISBN 190199239X.
- Griffiths, David; Philpott, Robert A.; Egan, Geoff (2007). Meols: the archaeology of the North Wirral coast discoveries and observations in the 19th and 20th centuries, with a catalogue of collections (PDF). Oxford University School of Archaeology Monograph Series. Vol. 68. Oxford. ISBN 978-1905905034.
