= Peter Fish =

Peter Fish may refer to:

- Tilapia, also known as St Peter's fish
- Peter Fish (lawyer)
- Peter Fish (composer)
