= John Greenwood (lawyer) =

English lawyer and cricketer

John Greenwood, QC (24 July 1800 – 12 February 1871) was an English lawyer and sportsman; he was Treasury Solicitor from 1866 to his death in 1871, and had played for Cambridge University in 1820–21.

== Biography ==
John Greenwood was born in Tunbridge Wells and was the third son of William Greenwood (died 1844) of Brookwood Park in Hampshire; his elder brother was George Greenwood (1799–1875), a cornet and regarded by Frederic Boase as the "best breaker in of horses of his day" whose 1839 book Hints on Horsemanship was regarded by the same as "the best book on the subject ever done".

After Eton School, John Greenwood went up to Jesus College, Cambridge, graduating in 1822. He made two appearances for the university cricket team between 1820 and 1821, scoring just two runs in three innings, including two ducks. Gaining a BA as 13th Wrangler in 1822, he became a Fellow of Jesus and was called to the Bar from Lincoln's Inn in 1828.

In 1847, he became Recorder of Portsmouth, and in 1848 became a QC and the Recorder of Devonport. He left that office in 1851 to become Assistant Solicitor to the Treasury, serving until promotion in 1866 to be Solicitor to the Treasury. He remained in that office until his death on 12 February 1871 at 53 Chester Square, London; the press reported that he had been suffering from an "affection of the throat" and an operation on his larynx to relieve it "drove the inflammation to the brain". He had married in 1835 to Fanny, daughter of William Collyns of Kenton, and had at least two sons. The Manchester Guardian's correspondent called him an "able and efficient solicitor ... [who] discharged his duties with signal ability".

Greenwood's sons included Granville George (1850–1928), an Shakespeare scholar, barrister, animal welfare reformer and politician who was knighted in 1916, and Charles William (1847–1907), a draughtsman and conveyancer; both played.

== Publications ==
- The Law Journal, a Digest of Cases in the Law Journal and Reports (1823).
- The law of loan societies, established under the statute 3 & 4 Vict. c. 110, 1846

Legal offices
Preceded by Henry Revell Reynolds	Treasury Solicitor; 1866–1871	Succeeded by John Gray
