= Michael Kerry =

English lawyer and civil servant

Sir Michael Kerry KCB QC

HM Procurator General and Treasury Solicitor
- In office 1980–1984
- Preceded by: Sir Basil Hall
- Succeeded by: Sir John Bailey

Legal Advisor to GCHQ
- In office 1984–1990

Personal details
- Born: 8 May 1923 Hampstead, London, England
- Died: 11 May 2012 (aged 89) Lindfield, West Sussex, England
- Spouse: Sidney (m. 1951; died 2003)
- Education: St John's College, Oxford (MA)

Sir Michael James Kerry KCB QC MA (5 August 1923 – 11 May 2012) was a British lawyer and civil servant who held the official titles of Her Majesty's Procurator General and Treasury Solicitor from 1980 to 1984.

Michael James Kerry was educated at Rugby School and St John's College, Oxford. During the Second World War, he served as an RAF pilot-officer and was trained in Japanese and codebreaking at the School of Oriental and African Studies and Bletchley Park. In June 1944 he went to the Wireless Experimental Centre in Delhi, India. He was called to the Bar by Lincoln's Inn in 1949 and joined the Solicitor's Department of the then Board of Trade in 1951. Following involvement with the case of the wreck of the Torrey Canyon in 1967, he was the UK representative to the Inter-Governmental Maritime Consultative Organization and was a founder member of its Legal Committee.

Michael Kerry was made a Companion of the Order of the Bath in 1976 and a Knight Commander of the Order of the Bath in the New Year Honours of 1983. He was appointed Queen's Counsel in 1984. After retiring from the Government Legal Service in 1984, Sir Michael became the first dedicated legal adviser to GCHQ 1984–1990.

Sir Michael was an Honorary Fellow of St John's College, Oxford.

Legal offices
| Preceded by Sir Basil Hall | HM Procurator General and Treasury Solicitor; 1980–1984 | Succeeded by Sir John Bailey |
