= Paul Jenkins (barrister) =

British barrister and civil servant (1954–2018)

Sir Paul Jenkins KCB QC (Hon)
- Born: September 22, 1954
- Died: February 26, 2018 (aged 63)
- Education: University of Manchester
- Occupations: Barrister, civil servant
- Office: Treasury Solicitor
- Predecessor: Juliet Wheldon
- Successor: Jonathan Guy Jones
- Spouse: René Hansen
- Awards: Knight Commander of the Order of the Bath

Sir Paul Christopher Jenkins, KCB, QC (Hon) (22 September 1954 – 26 February 2018), was a British barrister.

Jenkins was educated at Harrow County School for Boys and Manchester University.

From 2006 until February 2014, he was the Treasury Solicitor, the United Kingdom Government's principal legal official, in which role he served as the Attorney General's Permanent Secretary and Chief Executive of the Treasury Solicitor's Department (TSol). He was also Her Majesty's Procurator General and, as Head of the Government Legal Service, head of profession for the 2,000 lawyers advising government. He took office as Treasury Solicitor in August 2006. He was appointed Queen's Counsel (honoris causa) on 30 March 2009.

He was in a civil partnership with René Hansen from 2009.

Jenkins was called to the Bar of England and Wales in July 1977 and joined the Government Legal Service in 1979. His Government career started in TSol, but he then moved to the Monopolies and Mergers Commission, before moving back to TSol as the Legal Adviser to the Department for Digital, Culture, Media and Sport (DCMS). From 1998, he was the Legal Adviser to the Lord Chancellor's Department, which then became the Department of Constitutional Affairs where he was Director General of the Legal and International Groups. From 2004 until he was appointed Treasury Solicitor in 2006, he was the Legal Adviser to the Department for Work and Pensions and the Department of Health.

He also held the role of Civil Service Diversity Champion. He served on the board of the Europäische Rechtsakademie from 2002 to 2014 and was a trustee of the British Institute of International and Comparative Law and the Bingham Centre for the Rule of Law. He was appointed Knight Commander of the Order of the Bath (KCB) in the 2012 Birthday Honours. He was a bencher of Middle Temple, a non-executive member of the executive committee from 2007, and Treasurer from 1 January 2018 until his death on 26 February 2018, aged 63. He was also an independent member of the Ethics Committee at Tate.

In December 2014, he was asked by the Department for Culture, Media and Sport to undertake an independent review of the United Kingdom's Spoliation Advisory Panel, and reported in March 2015 making 29 substantive recommendations concerning the composition and working of the panel. The Government response accepted the Jenkins Review, which is considered a model of its kind for efficiency, speed, breadth and depth.

== Arms ==
Coat of arms of Paul Jenkins
Notes Designed by Patric Dickinson, Clarenceux King of Arms. The sinister half of the shield, with a blue lion on a yellow background, alludes to René Hansen's Danish origin. Motto Speak Truth To Power Orders Order of the Bath

Legal offices
Preceded by Dame Juliet Wheldon	HM Procurator General and Treasury Solicitor; 2006–2014	Succeeded by Jonathan Jones
