= Harold Kent =

British lawyer

Sir Harold Simcox Kent GCB QC (11 November 1903 – 4 December 1998) was a British lawyer.

== Early life ==
Kent was born on 11 November 1903 in Tianjin, China, where his father, Percy Horace Braund Kent, OBE, MC, was a barrister in the consular court specialising in Anglo-Chinese commerce; his mother, Anna Mary née Simcox, was the daughter of an English clergyman. He was educated in England: at a preparatory school in Malvern and then Rugby School, before going up to Merton College, Oxford in 1922.

== Career ==
After graduation in 1926, Kent joined the practice of Sir Donald Somervell as a pupil, and two years later he was called to the bar. At the same time, the market downturn after the Wall Street crash led him to pursue, briefly, a literary career. He was published in Punch and authored The Tenant of Smuggler's Rock (1930) and The Black Castle (1931). But literary pursuits did not satisfy him and the need for a regular source of income brought on by the birth of his first child encouraged him to fully return to the legal profession. He joined the office of the Second Parliamentary Counsel at the beginning of 1933 and was responsible for helping to draft legislation. In 1940 he was appointed a Parliamentary Counsel to the Treasury, where he was responsible firstly for drafting emergency wartime legislation, and then in peacetime for drafting many of the historic (and complex) acts implemented by the Attlee government, such as those concerning universal healthcare and the nationalisation of major industries. In 1953, he was appointed HM Procurator General and Treasury Solicitor, most notably serving as solicitor to the Vassall Tribunal. He retired from Government service in 1963, but remained active in law: he was Standing Counsel to the General Synod of the Church of England from 1964 to 1972 and Vicar-General of the Province of Canterbury from 1971 to 1976; he was, finally, Dean of the Arches from 1972 to 1976.

Kent was appointed to every grade of the Order of the Bath: Companion in the 1946 New Year Honours, Knight Commander in the 1954 New Year Honours and, the highest, Knight Grand Cross in the 1963 Birthday Honours. He was made a Queen's Counsel in 1973, and was awarded a Lambeth degree, Doctor of Civil Law, in 1977. In retirement, he lived in Gloucestershire. He died on 4 December 1998. He published an autobiography called In on the Act (Macmillan, 1979).

== Family ==
Kent was survived by his son James Micheal Kent; his wife, Zillah née Lloyd, whom he had married in 1930, died in 1987, and their daughter Margaret had died in 1963.

Legal offices
Preceded by Sir Thomas Barnes	HM Procurator General and Treasury Solicitor; 1953–1963	Succeeded by Sir Harvey Druitt
