= William Gregson (barrister) =

British barrister (1790–1863)

William Gregson (1790 – 16 February 1863) was a British barrister and parliamentary draftsman. He assisted in drafting a variety of laws in the 1820s and 1830s, including the Reform Act 1832, and was private secretary to Robert Peel. He served as under-secretary of state for the Home Department for three months in 1835.

== Life ==
Born in Liverpool in 1790, Gregson studied classics at Brasenose College, Oxford, graduating with a first-class degree in 1810. His examiners on that occasion called his work the best they had ever seen. He was called to the bar at Lincoln's Inn in 1815. From early in his career he acted as private secretary to the Tory, later Conservative, politician Robert Peel.

He was employed as counsel by successive home secretaries from 1826 to 1833, including under Whig governments, and assisted in the drafting of Peel's law reforms and the 1832 Great Reform Act. He served as under-secretary of state for the Home Department from 3 January to 18 April 1835 during the first Peel ministry; along with Denis Le Marchant in 1847–48, he is one of only two non-parliamentarians to have occupied that position since 1801.

Gregson was an advocate of prison reform, often visiting prisons in person, and an early promoter of the ragged schools. He co-founded Marlborough College and was a supporter of the Liverpool Collegiate Institution. Over the course of his career he gathered a collection of autographs of official figures, which was curated by his sister and included one document that he particularly prized, issued by the Supreme Council of Bengal and bearing the signatures of Governor Warren Hastings and Philip Francis. After retiring in around 1853, he returned to Liverpool, although he died in Clifton, Bristol, on 16 February 1863.

Political offices
Preceded by Edward Stanley	Under-Secretary of State for the Home Department; 1835	Succeeded by Fox Maule
