= Henry Ware (lawyer) =

British lawyer and government official

Sir Henry Gabriel Ware, KCB (23 July 1912 – 12 October 1989) was a British lawyer and government official.

== Career ==
Born on 23 July 1912, Ware was educated at Marlborough College and St John's College, Oxford; he was admitted a solicitor in 1938, and joined the Treasury Solicitor's Department in February 1939 as a Junior Legal Assistant. After the Second World War broke out, he joined the Royal Artillery and became a lance corporal; he was commissioned a second lieutenant in December 1939, and was later promoted to captain. For the decade after the war, he served as a legal adviser to the Ministry of Transport and was briefly involved in the establishment of the Independent Television Authority, before moving in 1955 to the Admiralty and the Air Ministry, where he was concerned with such issues as the status of the Sovereign Bases in Cyprus and the future of the naval dockyards in Malta. In the mid-1960s he was Principal Legal Adviser to the Department of Economic Affairs, and worked to draft parts of the July Measures (1966) to stave off a devaluation of the Pound (this failed to prevent to the 1967 Sterling crisis). In 1969, he became Deputy Treasury Solicitor, and in 1971 secured promotion to be HM Procurator General and Treasury Solicitor, serving until 1975.

Having been appointed a Companion of the Order of the Bath in 1971, Ware was promoted to Knight Commander the following year. In retirement, he lived in Surrey. He died on 12 October 1989, three years after his wife Gloria, née Platt, had died. Three of their four children were alive at the time of his death.

Legal offices
Preceded by Sir Harvey Druitt	HM Procurator General and Treasury Solicitor; 1971–1975	Succeeded by Sir Basil Hall
