= Basil Hall (civil servant) =

British civil servant

Sir Basil Hall KCB MC

HM Procurator General and Treasury Solicitor
- In office 1975–1980

Personal details
- Born: 2 January 1918; Finsbury Park, London, England
- Died: 2 May 2011 (aged 93)
- Military career
- Service / branch: 27th Lancers
- Battles / wars: World War II
- Awards: Military Cross

Sir Basil Brodribb Hall, KCB, MC (2 January 1918, Finsbury Park – 2 May 2011) was a British civil servant.

Hall was educated at Merchant Taylors' School, Northwood. He became an articled clerk with Gibson & Weldon in 1935; and was admitted solicitor in 1942. During World War II he served with the 27th Lancers. When peace returned he joined the Civil Service's Treasury Solicitor’s Department; and rose to become Treasury Solicitor from 1975 until 1980. He was Chairman of the Civil Service Appeal Board from 1981 to 1984; and the UK Member of the European Commission of Human Rights from 1985 to 1993.

== Notes ==
Legal offices
Preceded by Sir Henry Ware	HM Procurator General and Treasury Solicitor; 1975–1980	Succeeded by Sir Michael Kerry
