= Susanna McGibbon =

Senior British civil servant

Dame Susanna McGibbon DCB
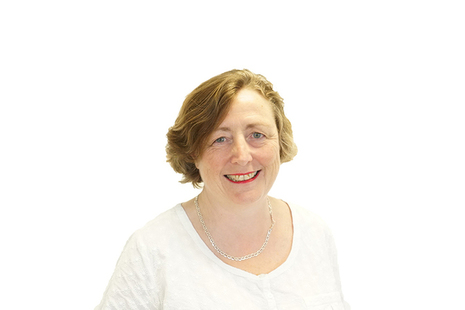

HM Procurator General, Treasury Solicitor and Head of the Government Legal Service
- In office 8 March 2021 – March 2026
- Attorney General: Suella Braverman (On Leave: 2 March 2021 – 10 September 2021); Michael Ellis (Acting: 2 March 2021 – 10 September 2021); Michael Ellis; Victoria Prentis; The Lord Hermer
- Preceded by: Sir Jonathan Jones
- Succeeded by: Douglas Wilson

Personal details
- Born: 11 November 1967 (age 58)
- Spouse: Patrick Spencer (m. 2004)
- Education: University of Sheffield; Inns of Court School of Law

Dame Susanna Justine McGibbon DCB (born 11 November 1967) is a barrister and former senior British civil servant who served as HM Procurator General, Treasury Solicitor and Head of the Government Legal Service, and so Permanent Secretary of the Government Legal Department from March 2021 until March 2026. She previously served as Director General of the Government Legal Department and Director General of the Department for Work and Pensions' Legal Group.

== Early life and education ==
McGibbon was born on 11 November 1967 in London and adopted by Ian McGibbon and Gwen McGibbon in early 1968. She was educated at Bolton County Grammar School (now St Catherine’s Academy) and then later at Canon Slade School, both in Bolton. She studied law at the University of Sheffield, graduating with a Bachelor of Laws (LLB) in 1989. After university, she completed the Bar Vocational Course (BVC) at the Inns of Court School of Law.

== Career ==
McGibbon worked as a private practice barrister after being called to the bar at Lincoln's Inn in 1990. Following a brief spell in private practice, McGibbon joined the Government Legal Profession first at the Foreign and Commonwealth Office before moving to the Treasury Solicitor's Department (GLD) in 1998 (where she also worked in the Ministry of Defence for two years). This was followed by employment in the Department for Education and Skills in 2000 and the Cabinet Office in 2002.

McGibbon then served as Legal Director for the Department for Trade and Industry (later Business, Enterprise and Regulatory Reform (2007) and Business, Innovation and Skills (2009)) from 2006 to 2009. Afterwards, she served as Legal Director for the Department for Communities and Local Government from 2009 to 2012.

In 2012, McGibbon became Director of Litigation in the GLD, tasked with conducting domestic litigation on behalf of most UK government departments. In 2018, McGibbon was appointed as Director General (Directorate B).

On 18 February 2021, it was announced that the Cabinet Secretary had, with the approval of the Prime Minister, appointed McGibbon to be the new Treasury Solicitor following the resignation of Sir Jonathan Jones. She took up the appointment on 8 March 2021, serving for five years until March 2026.

McGibbon was appointed a Dame Commander of the Order of the Bath (DCB) in the 2026 Birthday Honours for public service.

== Family and personal life ==
McGibbon married Patrick Spencer in 2004. She lists her recreations as travel (particularly Europe and Asia), music and "generally enjoying London life".
