= Iltid Nicholl =

Welsh lawyer

Iltid Nicholl (c. 1776 or 1777 – 8 November 1844), also spelt Iltyd Nicholl, was a Welsh lawyer. The son of Iltid Nicholl (died 1786) of Llanmaes (near Llantwit Major in Wales) and Jane, daughter of Henry Morgan, of Bristol, Nicholl was the nephew of the judge and member of Parliament Sir John Nicholl. In 1815, the younger Iltid Nicholl was appointed HM Procurator General (also called the King's Proctor) and served in that post until his death, which took place on 8 November 1844 at 9 Portland Place, London; he was then aged 67. He had several children; his eldest son, Henry Iltid Nicholl, was educated at St John's College, Oxford, became a barrister and was awarded the degree Doctor of Civil Law in 1841, but died in November 1845.
