= John Bailey (solicitor) =

British solicitor (1928–2021)

Sir John Bailey KCB

HM Procurator General and Treasury Solicitor
- In office 1984–1988
- Preceded by: Sir Michael Kerry
- Succeeded by: Sir James Nursaw

Personal details
- Born: 5 November 1928 Eltham, London, England
- Died: 22 February 2021 (aged 92) London, England
- Education: University College London

Sir John Bilsland Bailey KCB (5 November 1928 – 22 February 2021) was a British solicitor and public servant.

Bailey was born in Eltham, London to Walter Bailey, who ran the Lord Derby pub opposite Woolwich Arsenal, and composer Ethel Edith Bilsland, who married secondly Sir Thomas George Spencer, a telecommunications executive. His first cousin was actor John Bailey.

Bailey attended Eltham College and graduated from University College London with a law degree, and was later admitted as a solicitor in 1954. He was appointed an Under-Secretary in the Treasury Solicitor's Department in 1973, later serving as Legal Director of the Office of Fair Trading between 1977 and 1979, when he became Deputy Treasury Solicitor. He was promoted in 1984 to HM Procurator General and Treasury Solicitor, serving until 1988.

Bailey was appointed a Companion of the Order of the Bath in the 1982 New Year Honours, and he was promoted to Knight Commander in the 1987 Birthday Honours. He died in London from pneumonia on 22 February 2021, at the age of 92.

Legal offices
Preceded by Sir Michael Kerry	HM Procurator General and Treasury Solicitor; 1984–1988	Succeeded by Sir James Nursaw
