= Thomas Barnes (solicitor) =

English lawyer and public official

Barnes in 1953.

Sir Thomas James Barnes GCB CBE (21 March 1888 – 4 February 1964) was an English lawyer, who served as HM Procurator General and Treasury Solicitor between 1934 and 1953.

== Career ==
Thomas James Barnes was born on 21 March 1888 in Cheshire to Thomas Barnes, a clerk in the High Court of Justice, and Esther Mary, née Pither. After leaving the Mercers' School, in 1906 he was articled to R. J. Ball of H. C. Coote and Ball, and was admitted a solicitor in 1911.

He joined the Lord Chancellor's Department and became Principal Clerk, but his career there was interrupted by war service in the Royal Naval Volunteer Reserve during the First World War. After being discharged in 1917, he joined the Ministry of Shipping's legal department and became the Legal Adviser in 1919, the same year that he was appointed an Assistant Solicitor to the Board of Inland Revenue. The following year, he was appointed Solicitor to the Board of Trade.

After more than 13 years in this office, he was appointed HM Procurator General and Treasury Solicitor in 1934, the head of the government's legal department. He remained in the office until retiring in 1953. He was appointed a Commander of the Order of the British Empire in 1920, and was then knighted three times, firstly as a Knight Bachelor in 1927, then as a Knight Commander of the Order of the Bath in 1938, in which order he was promoted in 1948 to Knight Grand Cross.

In an entry in the Oxford Dictionary of National Biography, Robert Speed says that Barnes "was the first solicitor ever to be appointed to these offices [HM Procurator General and Treasury Solicitor] and he proved to be the outstanding government lawyer of his generation." His period in office witnessed substantial growth in the size of his Department's staff, while the responsibilities added to the role during the Second World War were considerable. He was also responsible for the Tribunals of Inquiry following the Budget Leak in 1936 and the Lynskey Tribunal of 1948.

In retirement, Barnes was a member of the Monopolies and Restrictive Practices Commission, helped to revise the Church of England's Canon Law, and played golf, his favourite sport. He died in London on 4 February 1964, leaving a widow, Elisie Margaret (formerly Clover; née Alexander), whom he had married nearly forty years earlier.

== Likenesses ==
- Two photographic portraits made in 1953 by Navana Vandyk in the National Portrait Gallery, London (references NPG x130326, NPG x130327).

== Archives ==
- Personal file in The National Archives, Kew (reference TS 60/119).

Legal offices
Preceded by Sir Maurice Gwyer	HM Procurator General and Treasury Solicitor; 1934–1953	Succeeded by Sir Harold Kent
