= Paul Viney =

British auctioneer and valuer (born 1949)

Paul Viney ASFAV
- Born: Paul Spencer Laurence Viney; 4 September 1949 (age 76)
- Education: Rugby School
- Occupations: Auctioneer; valuer; antique expert; auction house chairman
- Years active: 1971–2021
- Spouse: Sarah Tyrrell (m. 1977)

Paul Spencer Laurence Viney (born 4 September 1949) is a British auctioneer and valuer of fine art and antiques.

== Career ==
Viney attended Rugby School from 1963 to 1968.

Viney began his career at Oxford's Ashmolean Museum, before working for the National Trust at Waddesdon Manor, the former Rothschild home near Aylesbury.

He moved to Phillips, a British auction house, in 1971. He began as a porter, then became a general valuer, then vice-president in New York, then director in Oxford, main board director in London from 1978 to 1990, and European director from 1986 to 1992.

From 1984 to 2010, Viney conducted the Children in Need auctions with Sir Terry Wogan live on BBC Radio 2, every November, raising over £8 million for the charity.

He appeared as a specialist on Antiques Roadshow from 1993 to 2013.

=== Woolley & Wallis ===
For 20 years, Viney was chairman of Woolley & Wallis, a British auction house founded in 1884. While there, he oversaw the company's expansion, as well as auctioning ten lots of Asian art for more than £1 million, and a pair of diamond and pearl earrings for £1.4 million.

Viney retired in 2021.

=== Memberships ===
From 2009 to 2013, Viney was Chairman of the Society of Fine Art Auctioneers.

He is a member of the Court of the Worshipful Company of Arts Scholars and thus a Freeman of the City of London. From 2018 to 2019, he was Master of the company.

== Personal life ==
In 1977, the engagement was announced of Viney to Sarah Tyrrell, daughter of Mr C. W. Tyrrell of Briars Cross, Limpsfield Chart. They were married later that year. They have two children. Oscar (b.1982) and Sarah (b.1985).
