= Worshipful Company of Arts Scholars =

Livery company of the City of London

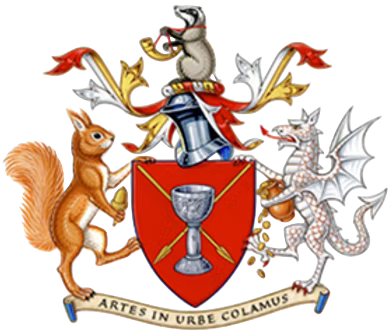
- Coat of Arms of the Worshipful Company of Arts Scholars
- Motto: Artes in urbe colamus
- Location: Furniture Makers' Hall, 12 Austin Friars, London EC2
- Date of formation: 2010 (Company without Livery); 11 February 2014 (Livery Company)
- Company association: Decorative and applied arts
- Order of precedence: 110th
- Master of company: Graham Barker DL FSA
- Website: artsscholars.org

The Worshipful Company of Arts Scholars ranks 110th in precedence of the City livery companies. Recognised as a Company without Livery in 2010, it was constituted a Livery Company on 11 February 2014 by the Court of Aldermen of the City of London. It represents "those involved in the study, curation, collection and trade in antiques, antiquities and objects of decorative and applied art."

== Masters Arts Scholar ==
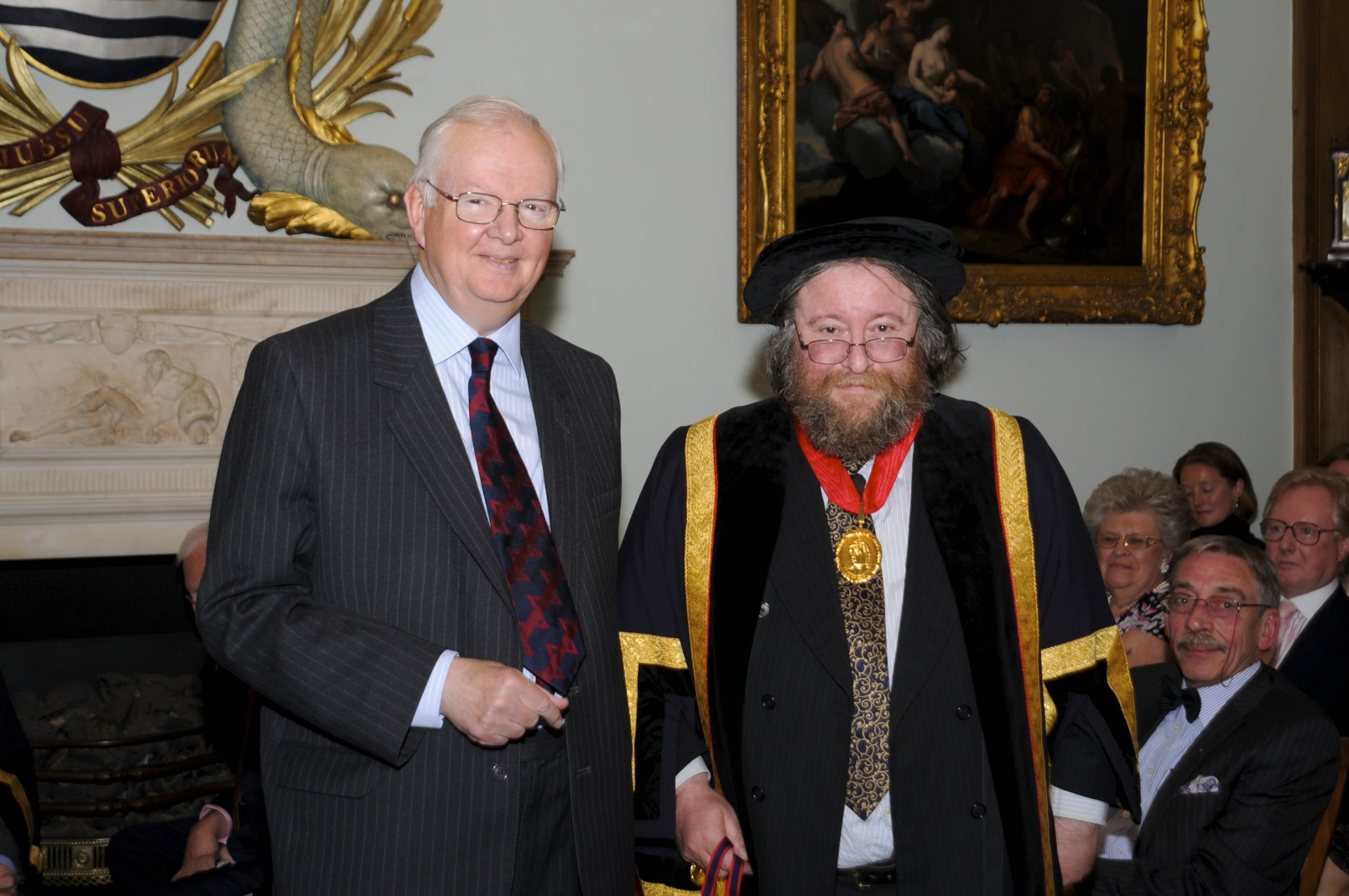
Dr Geoff Egan, Master Arts Scholar, with the Clerk to the company (left)

- 2006–07: Lord Brooke of Sutton Mandeville CH
- 2007–08: Geoffrey Bond OBE FSA
- 2008–09: Jonathan Horne MBE FSA
- 2009–10: Dr Geoff Egan FSA
- 2010–11: Mark Bridge
- 2011–12: Philippa Glanville OBE FSA
- 2012–13: Christopher Claxton Stevens
- 2013–14: Nicholas Somers FRICS
- 2014–15: Alderman Ian Luder CBE JP
- 2015–16: Alastair Leslie TD DL
- 2016–17: Tom Christopherson
- 2017–18: Dr Loyd Grossman CBE FRHistS
- 2018–19: Paul Viney
- 2019–20: Dr Georgina Gough FRGS
- 2020–22: John Spanner TD JP
- 2022–23: Alan S. Cook
- 2023–24: Graham Barker DL FSA

== Company Chaplain and Guild Church ==
- Revd Canon Roger Hall MBE
- Chapel Royal of St Peter-ad-Vincula

=== Clerk ===
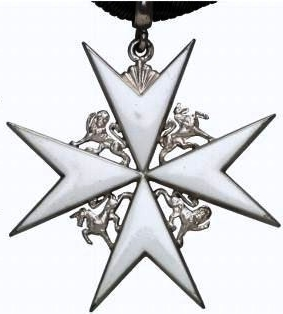

Ch Isp (retd) Alan Cook JP, Director of Ceremonies of the Order of St John, serves since 2021 as Clerk to the Arts Scholars' Company.

== See also ==
- Art
- History of Art
