= Loyd Grossman =

American-British journalist, broadcaster and entrepreneur (born 1950)

Sir Loyd Grossman CBE, FSA, FRSA, FSAS, FRHistS, FRSM
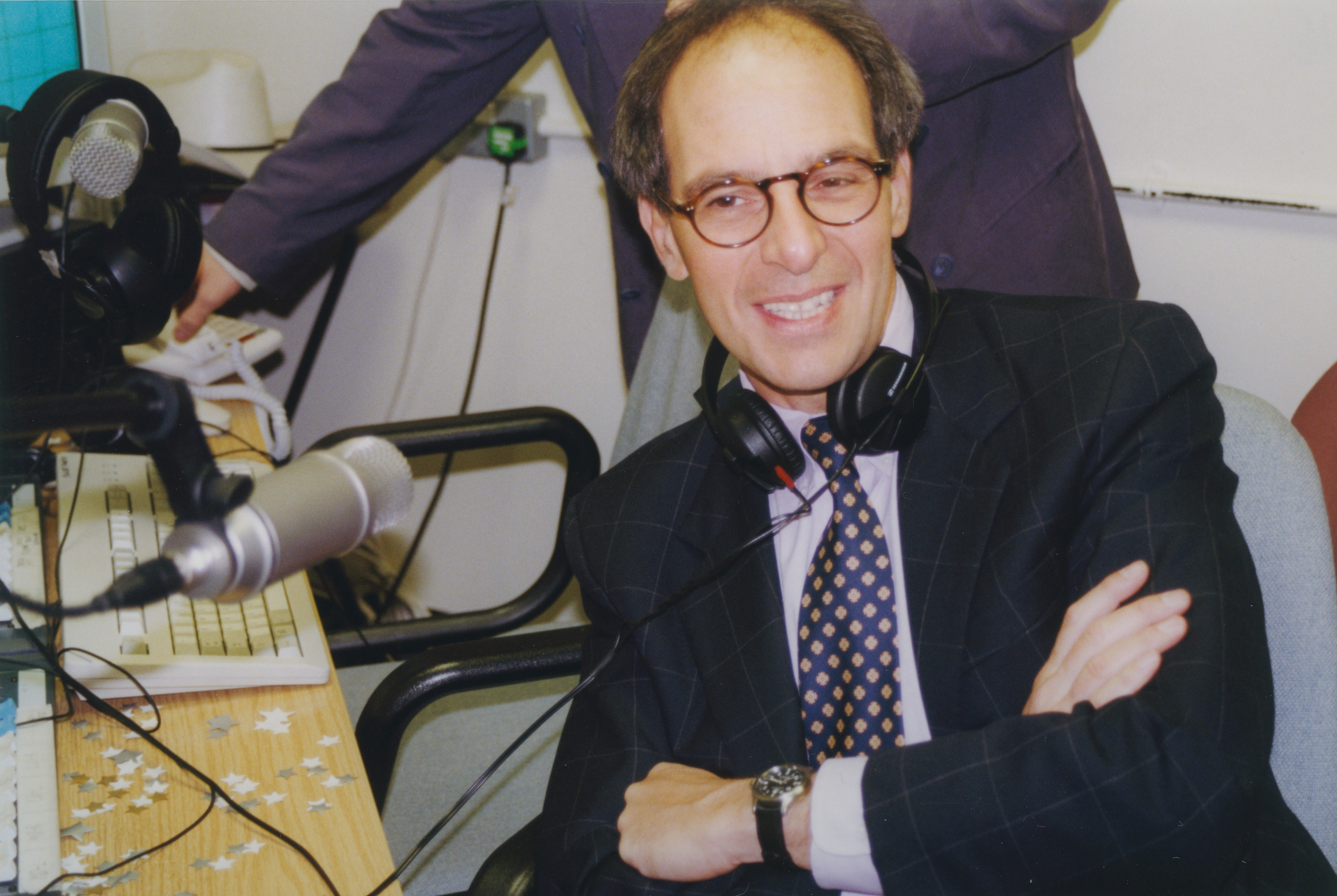
- Grossman in 1999
- Born: Loyd Daniel Gilman Grossman; 16 September 1950 (age 76); Boston, Massachusetts, U.S.
- Citizenship: United States; United Kingdom
- Education: Boston University (BA); LSE (MSc); University of Cambridge (MPhil, PhD)
- Occupations: Author; broadcaster; arts and heritage campaigner
- Spouse(s): Deborah Puttnam (m. 1985; div. 2004) Melissa Knatchbull (m. 2024)
- Children: 2
- Loyd Grossman's voice recorded 2012, as part of an audio description of the Royal Artillery Memorial for VocalEyes

Sir Loyd Daniel Gilman Grossman (born 16 September 1950) is an American-British author, broadcaster, musician, businessman and cultural campaigner who has mainly worked in the United Kingdom. He presented the BBC programme MasterChef from 1990 to 2000 and was a co-presenter, with David Frost, of the BBC and ITV panel show Through the Keyhole from 1987 until 2003.

== Early life and education ==
Grossman was born in Boston, Massachusetts, on 16 September 1950 and raised in Marblehead, Massachusetts, the son of David K. Grossman, a Jewish antique dealer and Helen Katherine (née Gilman). Many members of his father's family were art and antiques dealers in and around Boston. His cousin was Ram Dass, the spiritual teacher and author. His initial education was at the General John Glover School in Marblehead, and then at Marblehead High School. He graduated from Boston University with a BA degree cum laude in history in 1972. In 1975, he travelled to the United Kingdom to study at the London School of Economics, where he earned an MSc degree in economic history in 1977. Grossman later returned to university at Magdalene College, Cambridge, where he studied history of art, receiving in this subject an MPhil degree in 2009 and a PhD in 2014.

== Career ==
=== Journalism ===
Grossman became involved with journalism as an undergraduate in Boston writing for a number of 'underground' and music publications including Boston After Dark, Fusion, Vibrations, the New York Review of Rock and Rolling Stone. After graduation from the LSE he joined the staff of Harpers & Queen as design editor and subsequently went to work for The Sunday Times as contributing editor. He has written for many British newspapers and is a regular contributor to Country Life. While at Harpers & Queen he was also the magazine's restaurant critic, a pursuit which he continued for thirteen years also writing about restaurants for GQ and The Sunday Times.

=== Television ===
Grossman's television career began in 1983 as one of the regular faces on TV-am presenting among other things a short segment, Through the Keyhole, which he devised along with Kevin Sim and David Frost. Through the Keyhole transferred to primetime on ITV in 1987 and Grossman continued on the show until 2003. He presented Masterchef from 1990 to 2000 and Junior Masterchef as well as a great number of other programmes including Loyd on Location, The History of British Sculpture, and Behind the Headlines. He also presented the BBC Radio 3 series Composers at Home.

=== Music ===
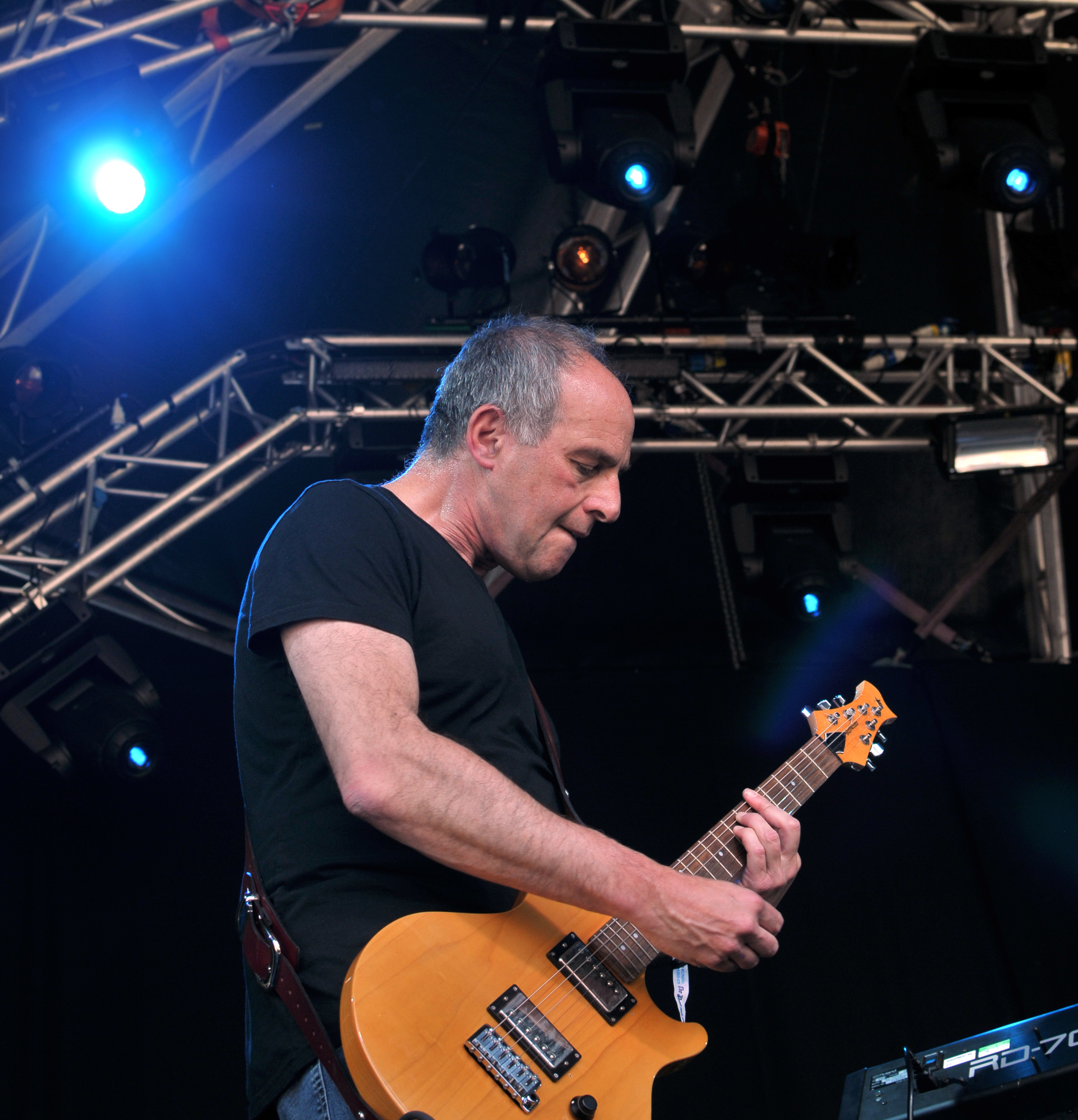
Grossman playing guitar on stage in 2009

Grossman has a continuing career as a guitarist initially with punk band Jet Bronx And The Forbidden, who reached number 47 in the UK singles chart in December 1977 with "Ain't Doin' Nothing". He returned to playing music in 2008 at the Vienna Rebellion Punk Festival. He subsequently formed a new band, The New Forbidden, with Valentine Guinness. The New Forbidden have appeared at Glastonbury eight times. Grossman also appears as a guest artist with Ian Anderson and Jethro Tull when they play their annual concerts in aid of English cathedrals.

=== Food ===
In 1995, Grossman introduced his own brand of cooking sauces, which a 2003 survey found to be the most successful UK celebrity brand. The sauces are produced by arrangement with Premier Foods.

In 2000, he was asked to head a project to improve the quality of food served in British NHS hospitals. Although some newspapers reported that the project had a £40 million budget, Grossman pointed out in a Nursing Times interview that almost all of that money was earmarked for the ward housekeeping programme. He was disappointed that there seemed to be little real money or political will to change hospital catering.

=== Heritage and the arts ===
Grossman's lifelong interest in history, the arts and heritage has involved him in a number of organisations. He is a former commissioner of the Museums and Galleries Commission, a former commissioner of English Heritage (where he was chairman of the Museums Advisory Committee and the Blue Plaques Panel), and of the Royal Commission on the Historical Monuments of England. He was a founding member of the Museums, Libraries and Archives Council, past chairman of the National Museums Liverpool, deputy chairman of Liverpool European Capital of Culture, chairman of Culture Northwest and of the Public Monuments and Sculpture Association. He founded the 24 Hour Museum (now Culture24).

He was chairman of the University for the Creative Arts from 2008 to 2012 and a member of the Court of Governors of the LSE from 1996 to 2009 and is now an emeritus governor. He was deputy chair of the Royal Drawing School, a member of the Council of the British School at Rome, a member of the board of the Association of Leading Visitor Attractions and a governor of the Building Crafts College. Grossman was chairman of the Churches Conservation Trust from 2007 to 2016 and in 2009 became chairman of the Heritage Alliance – the UK organisation that represents more than 100 leading non-governmental organisations across the heritage sector. In 2015, he was elected for an unprecedented third term as chairman. In 2016, he was appointed chairman of The Royal Parks. His term was extended on three occasions, to 4 July 2024 then 31 May 2025 before stepping down on 28 February 2026.

=== Current appointments ===
He was chairman of Gresham College, a governor of the British Institute at Florence, a governor of the Compton Verney House Trust and a trustee of the Warburg Charitable Trust. He is president of the Arts Society (formerly NADFAS) and patron of the Association for Heritage Interpretation.

=== Other activities ===
Grossman is Master of the Worshipful Company of Carpenters, an Honorary Liveryman of the Worshipful Company of Glaziers and Past Master of the Worshipful Company of Arts Scholars. He is a fellow of a number of learned societies: the Society of Antiquaries, the Royal Historical Society, the Society of Antiquaries of Scotland and the Royal Society of Medicine.

== Personal life ==
Grossman was married to Deborah Puttnam, the daughter of the film producer David Puttnam, from 1985 to 2004 and they have two daughters. In 2024, he married secondly the actress Melissa (Clare) Knatchbull (née Owen), daughter of High Court judge Sir John Owen and former wife of Michael Knatchbull, son of the Academy Award-nominated television and film producer John Knatchbull, 7th Baron Brabourne.

He is a keen scuba diver and a lifelong fan of the Boston Red Sox. His Anglo-American accent reflects his Boston origins and has frequently been the subject of parody including in adverts for his own sauces.

== Honours and awards ==
Grossman was appointed an Officer of the Order of the British Empire (OBE) in the 2003 Birthday Honours for services to patient care and promoted to Commander of the same Order (CBE) in the 2015 Birthday Honours for services to heritage. Grossman was knighted in the 2025 New Year Honours for services to Heritage.

He was awarded an honorary DLitt degree from the University of Chester in 2007, an honorary DArts degree from the University of Lincoln in 2010, and an honorary DUniv degree from the University of Essex in 2014, all in recognition of his work for heritage and tourism.

Grossman is a Fellow of the Society of Antiquaries of London (FSA) since 2010, a Fellow of the Royal Society of Arts (FRSA), a Fellow of the Society of Antiquaries of Scotland (FSAScot), a Fellow of the Royal Historical Society (FRHistS), and a Fellow of the Royal Society of Medicine (FRSM).

== Publications ==
- The Social History of Rock Music (1975)
- Harpers and Queen Guide to London's 100 Best Restaurants (1987)
- The Dog's Tale (1993)
- Loyd Grossman's Italian Journey (1994)
- Courvoisier's Book of the Best (1994–96) – as editor
- The World on a Plate (1997)
- The 125 Best Recipes Ever (1998)
- Foodstuff (2002)
- Benjamin West and the Struggle to be Modern (2013)
- An Elephant in Rome (2020)
