= Harvey Druitt =

British lawyer

Sir William Arthur Harvey Druitt, KCB (19 April 1910 – 6 February 1973), commonly known as Sir Harvey Druitt, was a British lawyer.

== Career ==
Born on 19 April 1910 to Arthur Druitt of Gullane, Harvey Druitt was educated at the Edinburgh Academy and Oriel College, Oxford. He was admitted a solicitor in 1935, joining the Treasury Solicitor's department two years later. In 1956, he was appointed Deputy Treasury Solicitor, and then in 1964 became HM Procurator General and Treasury Solicitor. He was the first Treasury Solicitor to be promoted from inside the office. Druitt retired in 1971; he had been appointed a Companion of the Order of the Bath in the 1951 Birthday Honours, and promoted to Knight Commander in the 1965 New Year Honours.

Outside of his legal work, Druitt played rugby for Oxford against Cambridge in 1929, 1930 and 1931, with one obituarist describing him as a "rawboned Scottish forward, good with his feet before forwards forgot how to dribble, and no mean kicker". He played three times for Scotland in 1936 before captaining London Scottish F.C. in 1937. In later life, he chaired the Civil Service Sports Council (1965–68) and was President of the Civil Service Rugby Club, which beat each of the armed forces' teams in one season for the first time under his presidency.

Druitt died on 6 February 1973, leaving a widow (Joan Holdsworth, née Swift) and one son (a daughter had predeceased him).

== Likenesses ==
- Portrait by Walter Bird (black and white, bromide print, 1965) in the National Portrait Gallery, London (reference no. NPG x167263).

Legal offices
Preceded by Sir Harold Kent	HM Procurator General and Treasury Solicitor; 1964–1971	Succeeded by Sir Henry Ware
Preceded by Sir Francis Enever	Deputy Treasury Solicitor; 1956–1963	Succeeded by Richard Alers-Hankey
