= Leslie Brass =

British lawyer and civil servant

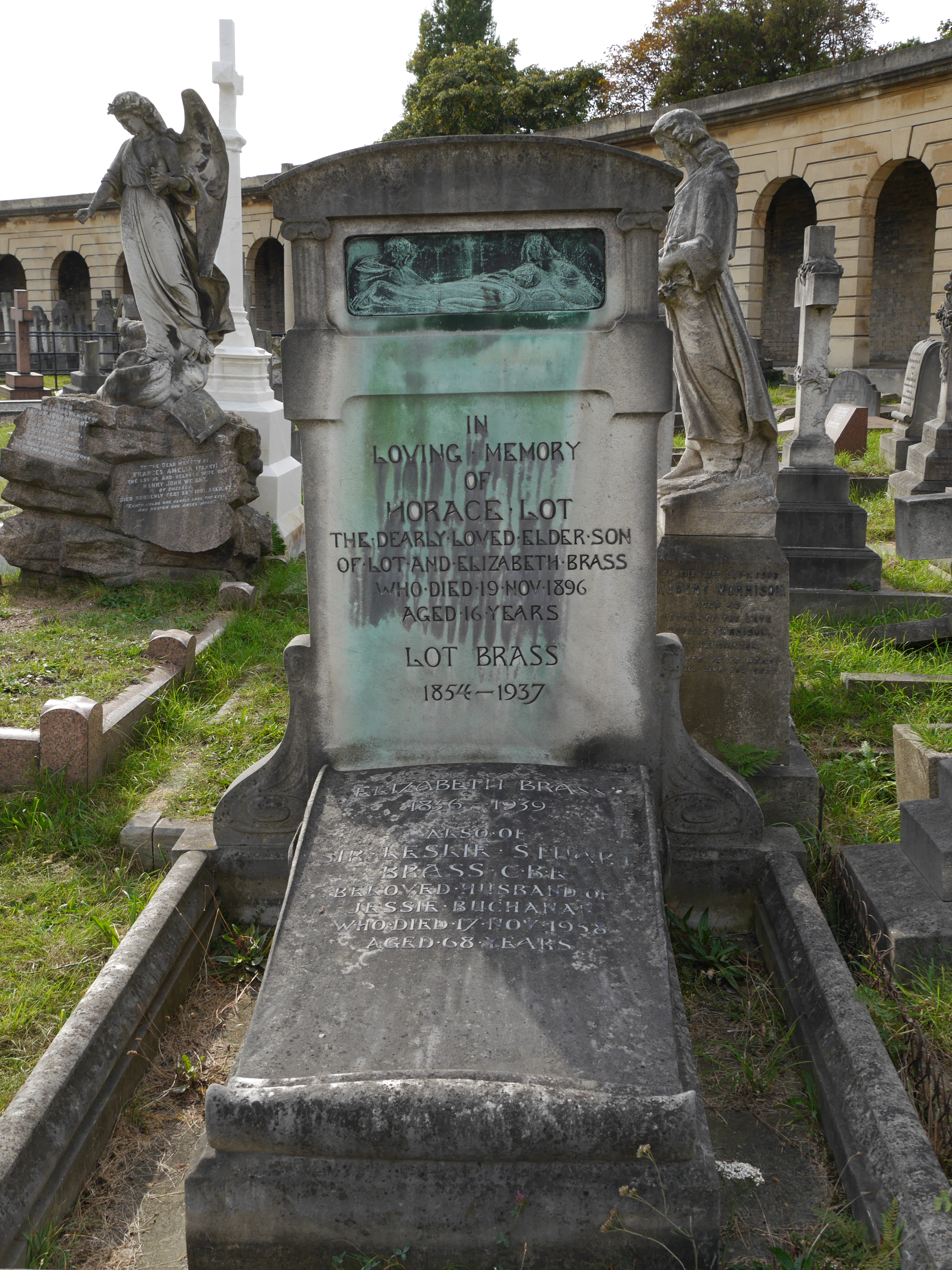
Brass family monument, Brompton Cemetery

Sir Leslie Stuart Brass CBE (12 November 1891 – 17 November 1958), was a British lawyer and civil servant, who was Legal Adviser to the Home Office from 1947 to 1956.

He was born on 12 November 1891 at 29 Trafalgar Square, Chelsea, London (now known as Chelsea Square), the son of Lot Brass (1854-1937), mechanical engineer, and his wife, Elizabeth Harnor. He was educated at St Paul's School, and from 1910 to 1914 at Christ Church, Oxford.

Brass served as a delegate on behalf of the United Kingdom to the Ad Hoc Committee on Statelessness and Related Problems at Lake Success, New York, which produced the 1951 Refugee Convention.

Brass died suddenly of a heart attack in Western Road, Hove, Sussex, on 17 November 1958, and is buried in Brompton Cemetery.

The 1899 Brass family tomb, "a large and prominent memorial in an unusual Art Nouveau-influenced style" with sculpture by A. Stanley Young, is a Grade II listed funerary monument.

== Family ==
He was married to Jessie Buchanan.
