= Ethel Edith Bilsland =

English composer, soprano, and pianist (1892–1982)

Ethel Edith Bilsland (20 January 1892 – 2 November 1982) was an English composer, soprano and pianist.

Born in Plumstead, Kent, she was the younger daughter of James Bilsland and Mary Ann Moore. It was a musical family. Bilsland studied at the Royal Academy of Music with Alexander Mackenzie and (for singing) Agnes Larkcom. She was already performing and composing by 1911. Mackenzie conducted a performance of her Adagio and Scherzo for piano and orchestra at the Queen's Hall in June 1912. In 1912 she won the Charles Lucas Medal, awarded for the finale of her Symphony. Three years later a Serenade for string quartet and piano was reviewed in The Music Student. And in 1915 her music was included in a Society of Women Composers concert of chamber music, alongside music by Katherine Eggar, Liza Lehmann and Marion Scott.

In 1920 she married Walter Baley, proprietor of the Lord Derby public house opposite Woolwich Arsenal in Plumstead. They had two children, Margaret (1926 – 2006) and John (1928 – 2021). She continued to develop her own career after her marriage: for instance, she performed as a singer in the 1923 Proms season, and for the 1925/6 season was signed by agents Ibbs and Tillett. However, in 1932 her husband died and she had to support the upbringing of her children alone, leaving little time for composition. She turned instead to the more lucrative activities of vocal instruction, examining and adjudicating, becoming a professor of voice at the Royal Academy of Music.

Bilsland composed vocal, piano, chamber music (including several string quartets and a piano quartet) and orchestral music (including a symphony and a piano concerto), though most of it remained unpublished. Her short piano suite of miniatures The Birthday Party was written in 1918 for her young nephews. It was revived by pianist Samantha Ege in 2018 and has been published by Faber Music.

Living in Plumstead and Eltham, South London for most of her adult life, she supported local music making there, organising and accompanying. Her daughter Margaret became a pianist. Her son was the prominent solicitor and public servant Sir John Bailey. In 1953 she married Sir Thomas Spencer, managing director of Standard Telephones and Cables, becoming Lady Spencer and moving to Tudor House, Petts Wood in Kent. He died in 1976. Ethel Bilsland died at the age of 90 in Petts Wood.
