= Gerald Hosker =

British lawyer and public servant (1933–2024)

Sir Gerald Albery Hosker, KCB, KC (Hon) (28 July 1933 – 30 November 2024) was a British lawyer and public servant.

== Early life and education ==
Born in 1933, Sir Gerald was the son of Leslie Reece Hosker and Constance Alice, née Hubbard. He was educated at Berkhamsted School. He also attended the Law Society's College of Law, London.

== Career ==
=== Legal career ===
Hosker became an articled clerk at Derrick Bridges & Co. in 1951, but after being admitted a solicitor in 1956 he worked for Clifford Turner & Co., before joining the Treasury Solicitor's Department in 1960. After several promotions, he was appointed an under-secretary in the Department in 1982, before serving as Deputy Treasury Solicitor between 1984 and 1987. He was then Legal Adviser to the Department of Trade and Industry until his appointment in 1992 as HM Procurator General Treasury Solicitor and the Queen's Proctor, in which offices he served until retiring in 1995.

=== Post-retirement ===
In 1998 the Secretary of State for Defence appointed him as a trustee of the Royal Air force Museum; he retired in 2009. In February 1999, Hosker was appointed by the Paymaster General to conduct an Inquiry into the Customs and Excise aspects of the Simon de Danser drugs case and in 2001 he conducted an inquiry on behalf of the Secretary of State for Work and Pensions into the handling of the C W Cheney & Sons Pension Fund by the Occupational Pensions Regulatory Authority. Sir Gerald was appointed Public Inquiry commissioner in the Falkland Islands 1999-2000.

Hosker died from renal failure and heart complications on 30 November 2024, at the age of 91.

Legal offices
Preceded by Sir James Nursaw	HM Procurator General and Treasury Solicitor; 1992–1995	Succeeded by Michael Saunders
