= Jonathan Jones (civil servant) =

British lawyer (born 1962)

Sir Jonathan Jones KCB KC
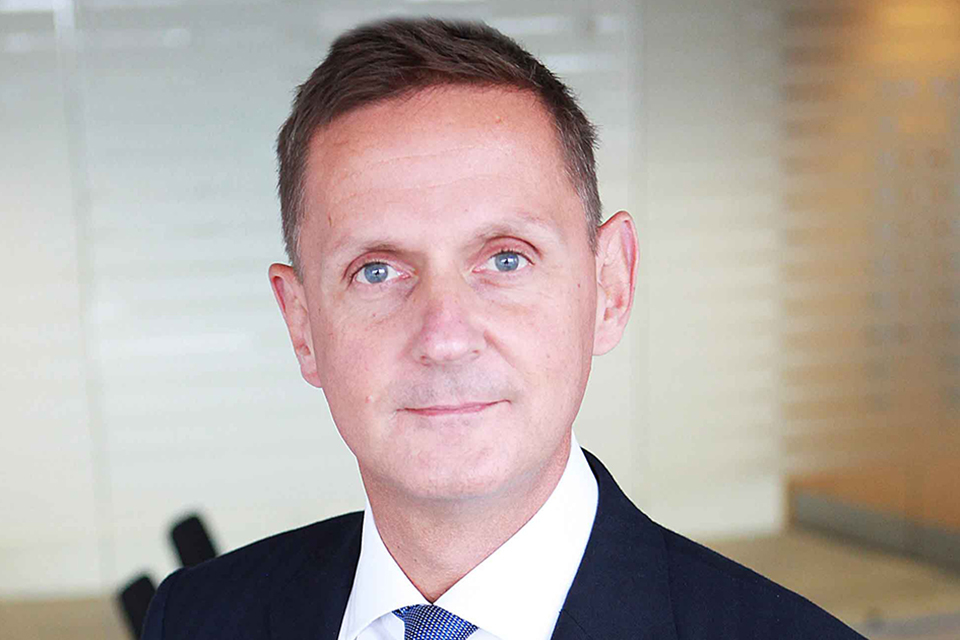

HM Procurator General, Treasury Solicitor and Head of the Government Legal Service
- In office 1 March 2014 – 9 November 2020
- Attorney General: Dominic Grieve (2014); Jeremy Wright (2014-18); Geoffrey Cox (2018-20); Suella Braverman (2020)
- Preceded by: Sir Paul Jenkins
- Succeeded by: Susanna McGibbon

Personal details
- Born: 21 May 1962 (age 64)
- Education: Durham University

Sir Jonathan Guy Jones KCB KC (born 21 May 1962) is a British lawyer, appointed in March 2014 and serving until his resignation on 8 September 2020 as HM Procurator General, Treasury Solicitor and Head of the Government Legal Service, and so the Permanent Secretary of the Government Legal Department (until April 2015, named the Treasury Solicitor's Department).

== Early life and education ==
Jones attended Llandovery College in Carmarthenshire before attending St Chad's College at Durham University where he read a BA in law, graduating in 1984 with a 2:2.

== Career ==
He then was called to the Bar in 1985 and served as a legal advisor to the Motor Agents Association for three years before joining the government in the Office of Fair Trading in 1989. In 1993 Jones transferred to the Treasury Solicitor's Department, briefly into the division working with the Department for Transport, then as Legal Secretariat to the Law Officers from 1994 until 1998. In 1998 Jones became deputy legal advisor to HM Treasury.

In 2002, Jones was promoted to be a director, initially serving as the Legal Director of the Department for Education and Skills, and two years later promoted again to be the Director-General of the Attorney General's Office. In 2009 Jones became the Deputy Treasury Solicitor, and after three years moved to the Home Office as their Director-General for Legal Affairs from 2012 until 2014.

On 1 March 2014, Jones was appointed the Treasury Solicitor, replacing Sir Paul Jenkins on his retirement. In April 2015, the Treasury Solicitor's Department was renamed to be the Government Legal Department, and with it, parts of Jones's job title. As of 2015, Jones was paid a salary of between £160,000 and £164,999, making him one of the 328 most highly paid people in the British public sector at that time.

In January 2019, Queen Elizabeth II approved Jones's appointment as one of six new Honorary Queen's Counsel.

Jones was appointed Knight Commander of the Order of the Bath (KCB) in the 2020 New Year Honours for public service.

Shortly before 8 September 2020 Jones resigned in protest against the government's plans to breach the special Brexit arrangements for Northern Ireland, through the UK Internal Market Bill, in contravention of international law. A spokesman for the Attorney General's Office confirmed the resignation but refused to comment.

After observing a 3-month pause in accordance with advice from the Advisory Committee on Business Appointments, Jones took up a position as a senior consultant with the international law firm Linklaters from 15 March 2021.

Jones is also an Honorary Professor at Durham Law School, a Senior Fellow of the Institute for Government, an Honorary Senior Fellow of the Bingham Centre for the Rule of Law, a Master of the Bench of Middle Temple, and a lay canon and member of the Chapter of Ely Cathedral.

Jones was a member of the UK Governance Project, chaired by Dominic Grieve, whose report in February 2024 recommended improvements in standards in public life and governance in the UK.

In January 2025 Durham University awarded Jones an honorary Doctorate of Civil Law.

In February 2025 the Home Secretary, Yvette Cooper, appointed Jones to undertake an independent review of a case in which MI5 had provided incorrect evidence to the High Court and the Investigatory Powers Tribunal.

Political offices
Preceded by ???	Legal Director, Department for Education and Skills; 2002–2004	Succeeded by ???
Preceded by ???	Director-General; Attorney General's Office; 2004–2009	Succeeded by Peter Fish
Preceded by David Pearson	Deputy Treasury Solicitor; Treasury Solicitor's Department; 2009–2012	Succeeded by Peter Fish
Preceded by David Seymour	Director General, Legal; Home Office; 2012–2014	Succeeded by Peter Fish
Preceded by Sir Paul Jenkins	HM Procurator General, Treasury Solicitor and Head of the Government Legal Service; 2014–2020	Incumbent
Preceded by Sir Paul Jenkins	Permanent Secretary, Treasury Solicitor's Department; 2014–2015	Succeeded by himself
Preceded by himself	Chief Executive, Government Legal Department; 2015–2020	Incumbent
