= Peter Fish (lawyer) =

Director-General, Legal, Home Office
- Incumbent
- Assumed office 2014-03-01
- Home Secretary: Theresa May
- Preceded by: Jonathan Jones

Peter James Reginald Fish CB is a former senior British government lawyer, who served from April 2014 to 2021 as the Director-General for Legal affairs at the Home Office. In each of his most recent three postings since 2009 he has immediately followed Jonathan Guy Jones, who now serves as HM Procurator General and Treasury Solicitor; first as the Director-General of the Attorney General's Office, then as Deputy Treasury Solicitor, and now at the Home Office.

Fish was appointed Companion of the Order of the Bath (CB) in the 2017 New Year Honours.

Political offices
Preceded by ???	Legal Director, Cabinet Office; 2005-2009	Succeeded by Iain Macleod
Preceded by Jonathan Jones	Director-General; Attorney General’s Office; 2009-2012	Succeeded by Rowena Collins-Rice
Preceded by Jonathan Jones	Deputy Treasury Solicitor; Treasury Solicitor’s Department; 2012-2014	Succeeded by ???
Preceded by Jonathan Jones	Director General, Legal; Home Office; 2014-2021	Succeeded by ???
