= Foreshore of the River Thames =

Foreshore of the River Thames in London, England

Coordinates: 51.509°N 0.102°W

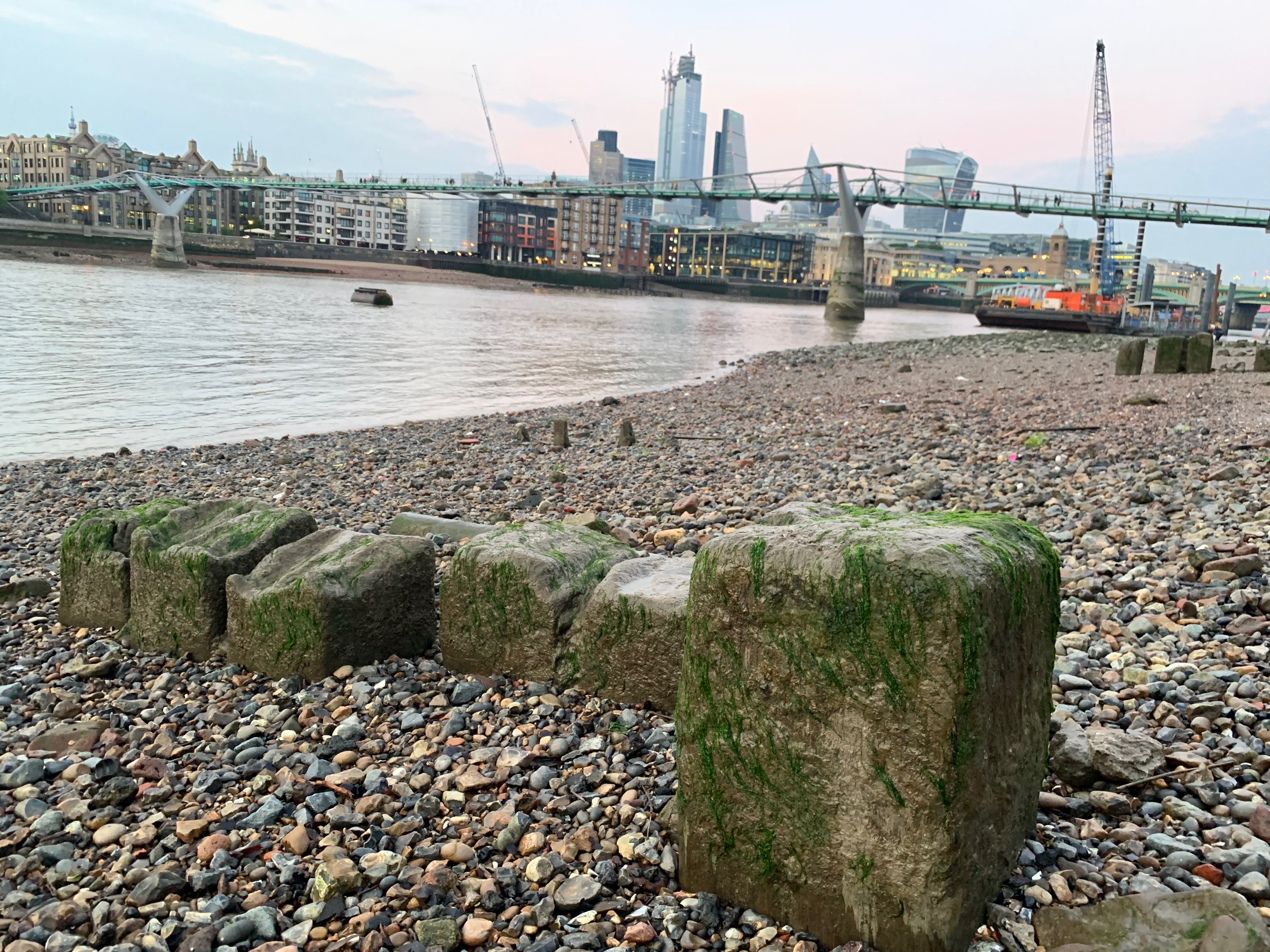
The foreshore at Millennium Bridge

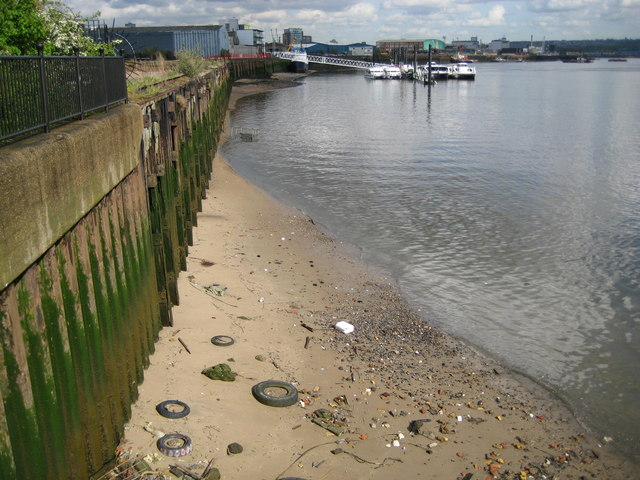
Sand at Blackwall

The foreshore of the River Thames in London, England, is the area of the riverbed revealed at low tide, and includes sections known as Tower Beach, Bermondsey Beach, and Folly House Beach, in Canary Wharf. These are tidal beaches that are covered by the water of the river at high tide.

Many of these tidal beaches are potentially dangerous, as the rising tide can rapidly cut off visitors to the area, and the River Thames is an inhospitable environment for swimmers. Mudlarking - scavenging items of value from the revealed riverbed - is an activity associated with these areas, for which the Port of London Authority requires a Thames foreshore permit. The foreshore also has other dangers including the presence of sewage and other hazardous waste and risks from Weil's disease.
