= Michael Saunders (lawyer) =

British lawyer and public servant (1944 to 1996)

Michael Lawrence Saunders, CB, QC (13 April 1944 – 17 December 1996) was a British lawyer and public servant.

== Education and early career ==
Saunders attended Clifton College, before completing an undergraduate law degree at the University of Birmingham and then the postgraduate Bachelor of Laws degree at the University of Cambridge. He was third secretary (1966–68) and then second secretary (1968–72) to the Hague Conference on Private International Law. Called to the bar in 1971, he joined the Department of Trade and Industry the following year as a senior legal assistant.

== Career ==
The experience at the Hague Conference gave Saunders a detailed working knowledge of European Union law, which was valued by the ministers he advised. He spent periods in the Treasury Solicitor's Department and the Law Officers' Department, before he was appointed an Assistant Treasury Solicitor in 1979. He returned to the Law Officers' Department four years later and served as its Legal Adviser between 1986 and 1989, when he became Solicitor to HM Revenue and Customs. In 1992, he became Legal Adviser to the Home Office, his final appointment before promotion to HM Procurator General and Treasury Solicitor in 1995; he was the first appointed to the latter office following open competition.

The Times remarked that "The mid-1990s at the Home Office were a less happy time ... it is open to conjecture that [Saunders] did not, after, 1993 find the present Home Secretary [Michael Howard] the most congenial of ministers to advise on law. The entanglement of [Howard] with the judiciary – especially over the legislation on compensation for victims of crimes of violence – was the product of a minister (himself a QC) not listening to his legal adviser".

Saunders died on 17 December 1996, after a heart attack, the year after his promotion to Treasury Solicitor; his obituary in The Times recorded an "outstanding career" as a legal adviser to ministers. He had been appointed a Companion of the Order of the Bath in 1990, and had taken silk in 1995.

Legal offices
Preceded by Sir Gerald Hosker	HM Procurator General and Treasury Solicitor; 1995–1996	Succeeded by Sir Anthony Hammond
