= James Nursaw =

British lawyer and public servant (1932–2025)

Sir James Nursaw, KCB, KC (18 October 1932 – 21 October 2025) was a British lawyer and public servant.

== Life and career ==
Born on 18 October 1932, Nursaw attended Christ's College, Cambridge, graduating with a Bachelor of Arts degree in 1953 and a Bachelor of Laws degree in 1954. He was called to the bar in 1955, and after a year as a senior research officer at Cambridge's Department of Criminal Science, he joined the Legal Advisory at the Home Office in 1959. After serving as Legal Adviser to the Law Officers' Department (1980–83) and then the Home Office and Northern Ireland Office (1983–88), he was appointed HM Procurator General and Treasury Solicitor, serving between 1988 and retirement in 1992.

Nursaw was appointed a Companion of the Order of the Bath in 1983, and he was promoted to Knight Commander in 1992. He took silk in 1988.

Nursaw died from a chest infection on 21 October 2025, at the age of 93.

Legal offices
Preceded by Sir John Bailey	HM Procurator General and Treasury Solicitor; 1988–1992	Succeeded by Sir Gerald Hosker
