= Juliet Wheldon =

Dame Juliet Louise Wheldon DCB, QC (26 March 1950 – 2 September 2013) was a British civil servant, latterly (as of 2009) the legal adviser to Mervyn King, the Governor of the Bank of England. From July 2000 until 2006 she was the first British woman to serve as Treasury Solicitor and Head of the Government Legal Service. In 2008 she was named as one of The Times Law 100.

== Education ==
Wheldon attended Sherborne School For Girls and Lady Margaret Hall, Oxford, where she read history, before being called to the Bar by Gray's Inn in 1975.

== Career ==
- Department of the Treasury Solicitor (1976–83), Advisory Division
- Law Officers' Department (1983–84)
- Department of the Treasury Solicitor (1984–86), Assistant Legal Secretary
- Law Officers' Department (1986–87)
- Department of the Treasury Solicitor (1987–89), Legal Adviser
- Law Officers' Department (1989–97), Legal Secretary
- Home Office (1997–2000), Legal Adviser
- HM Procurator General Office, Treasury Solicitor/Head of the Government Legal Service (2000–06)

== Affiliations ==
- Patron, Human Rights Lawyers' Association

== Honours ==
- Commander of the Order of the Bath (2004)
- Queen's Counsel (Hon.) (1997)
- Dame Commander of the Order of the Bath (2004)

== Personal life ==
Dame Juliet Wheldon was unmarried and had no children. She died of cancer on 2 September 2013.

Legal offices
Preceded by Sir Anthony Hammond	HM Procurator General and Treasury Solicitor; 2000–2006	Succeeded by Sir Paul Jenkins
