= Anthony Hammond (solicitor) =

British lawyer (1940–2020)

Sir Anthony Hilgrove Hammond, KCB (27 July 1940 – 24 June 2020) was a British lawyer and public servant.

== Early life and education ==
Hammond was born in India, the son of Col. Charles William Hilgrove Hammond and Jessie Eugenia Francis. He was educated at Malvern College and Emmanuel College, Cambridge, graduating with a Bachelor of Arts degree in 1962 and a Bachelor of Laws degree the following year.

== Career ==
Hammond was articled to London County Council in 1962 and worked as a solicitor with Greater London Council on admission in 1965. He joined the Home Office as a legal assistant in 1968 and, after several promotions, served as its Legal Adviser between 1988 and 1992. He then worked in the Department of Trade and Industry, eventually as Director-General of Legal Services, before he was appointed HM Procurator General and Treasury Solicitor in 1997. He left the office in 2000, and then worked as a legal counsel to Hakluyt & Company until 2005. He was also Standing Counsel to the General Synod of the Church of England between 2000 and 2013.

In January 2001, Hammond was appointed by the Prime Minister, Tony Blair, to lead an inquiry into the Hinduja passport scandal. It had emerged that two Indian brothers, denied UK passports in 1990, had their reapplication for UK passports approved in 1998 and 1999; this followed their commitment to donate to the Millennium Dome which the cabinet minister Peter Mandelson was responsible for; the scandal revolved around Mandelson's involvement in their application process. Mandelson consistently denied wrong-doing. Hammond's appointment was criticised by Kevin Maguire in The Guardian; he reported that Hammond was "an old Home Office hand" who had previously issued public interest immunity certificates to "suppress evidence of government collusion in the sale of weapons-making machinery to Baghdad in breach of a UN embargo" (the arms-to-Iraq scandal). Hammond had justified the certificates by saying that "the very nature of the work of the security and intelligence services of the crown requires secrecy if it is to be effective". Hammond's report into the Hinduja scandal cleared all parties of wrong-doing, although Mandelson had already resigned from the cabinet.

He died on 24 June 2020 at the age of 79.

== Honours and awards ==
Hammond was made a Freeman of the City of London in 1991, an honorary Queen's Counsel in 1997 and Master of the Worshipful Company of Glass Sellers for the year 2007. Appointed a Companion of the Order of the Bath in 1991, he was promoted to Knight Commander in 2000.

Legal offices
Preceded by Michael Saunders	HM Procurator General and Treasury Solicitor; 1997–2000	Succeeded by Dame Juliet Wheldon
