= John Gray (barrister) =

British lawyer and legal writer

John Gray, QC (1807 – 22 January 1875) was a British lawyer and legal writer. The younger son of George Gray, he was born in Aberdeen where he was educated at Gordon's Hospital, before joining a firm of solicitors, Messrs White and Whitmore. He was called to the bar in 1838, four years after being admitted to the Middle Temple. He took silk in 1863 and was appointed Solicitor to the Treasury in 1871, serving until he died in 1875. He conducted the prosecution of the claimant in the infamous Tichborne case.

== Publications ==
- The Country Attorney's Practice (1836); 6th ed. (1845).
- The Country Solicitor's Practice (1837); 4th ed. (1845).
- Law of Costs (1853).
