= Small finds =

Archaeological term

Small finds is an archaeological term for artifacts discovered on excavations that are considered distinct from the common finds for that type site or type phase on multi phasic sites. The special nature of the find is dictated by research agendas and the information the artifact can provide.

As the name implies, small finds tend to be small artifacts, and generally appear infrequently on sites. Some examples of artifacts classified as small finds include items of personal adornment, clothing, health, or hygiene, hand tools or items used for food preparation, recreation, or crafts like needlework; and personal items like smoking pipes, children's toys, or coins. In particular, coins can be much more specific when it comes to dating evidence.

Small finds are usually treated differently in the recording system; often they are recorded on plan rather than being attributed to a single context like other generic finds.

== Gallery ==
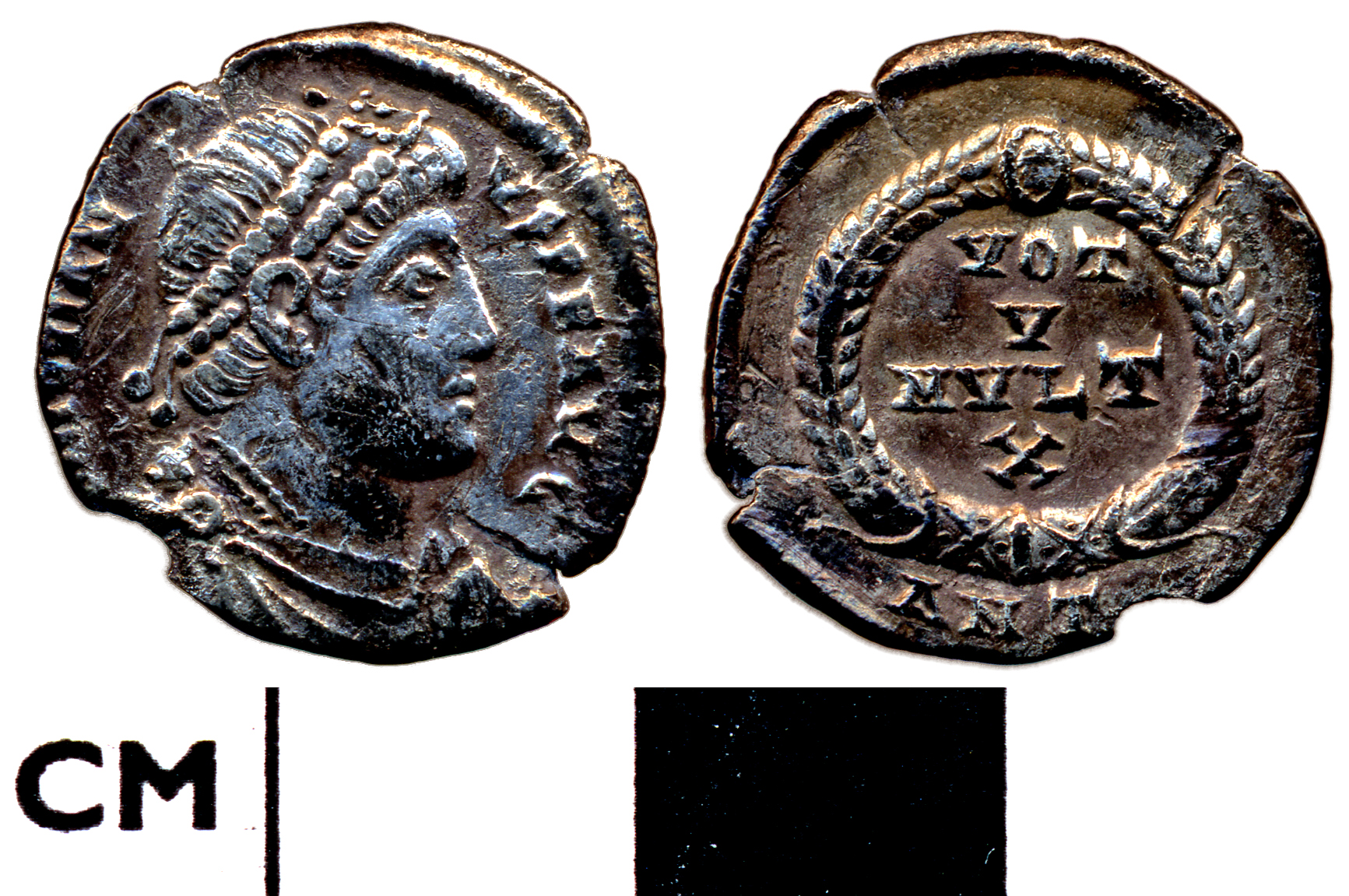
Roman coin

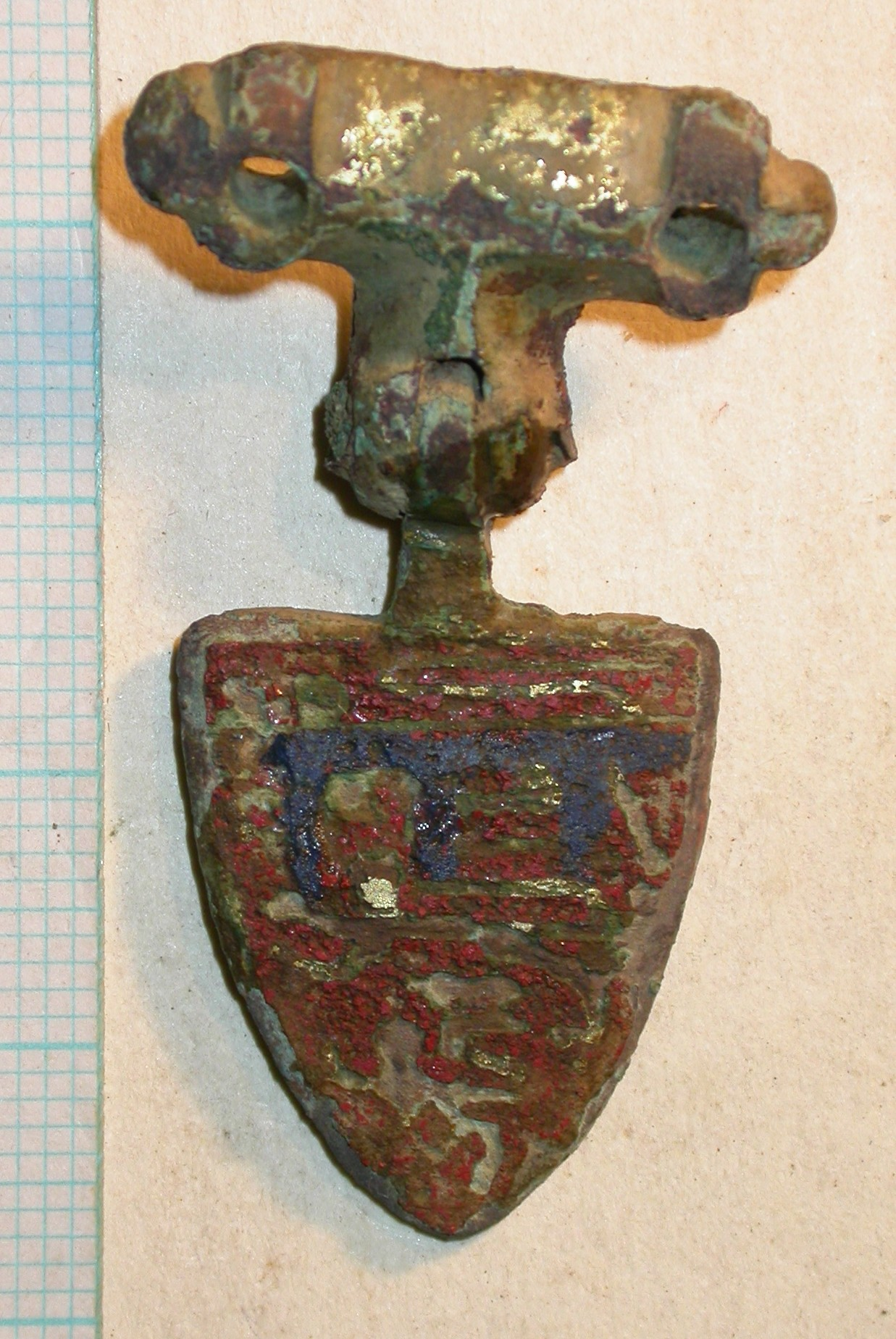
Enamelled medieval harness pendant

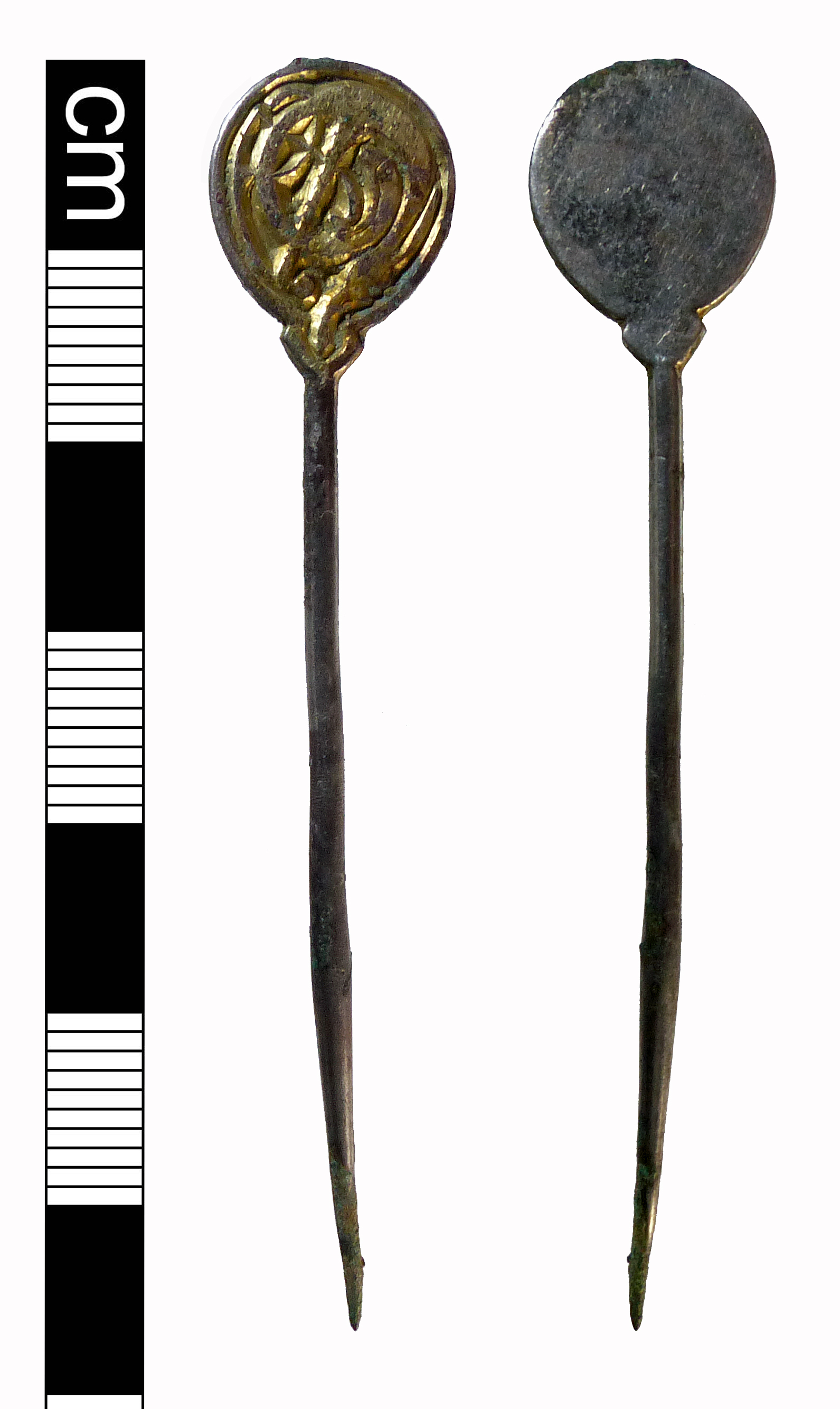
Silver gilt pin

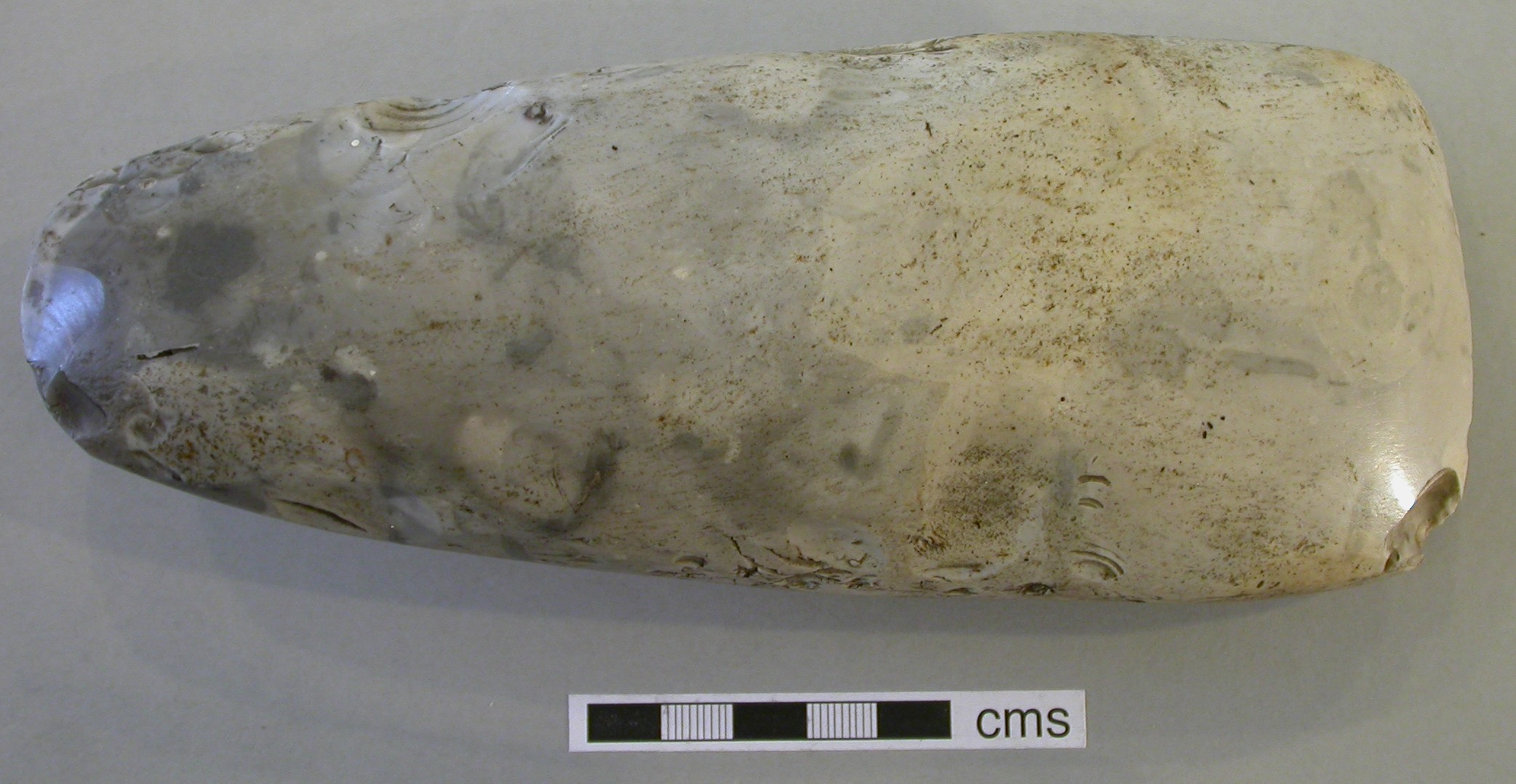
Neolithic flint axe

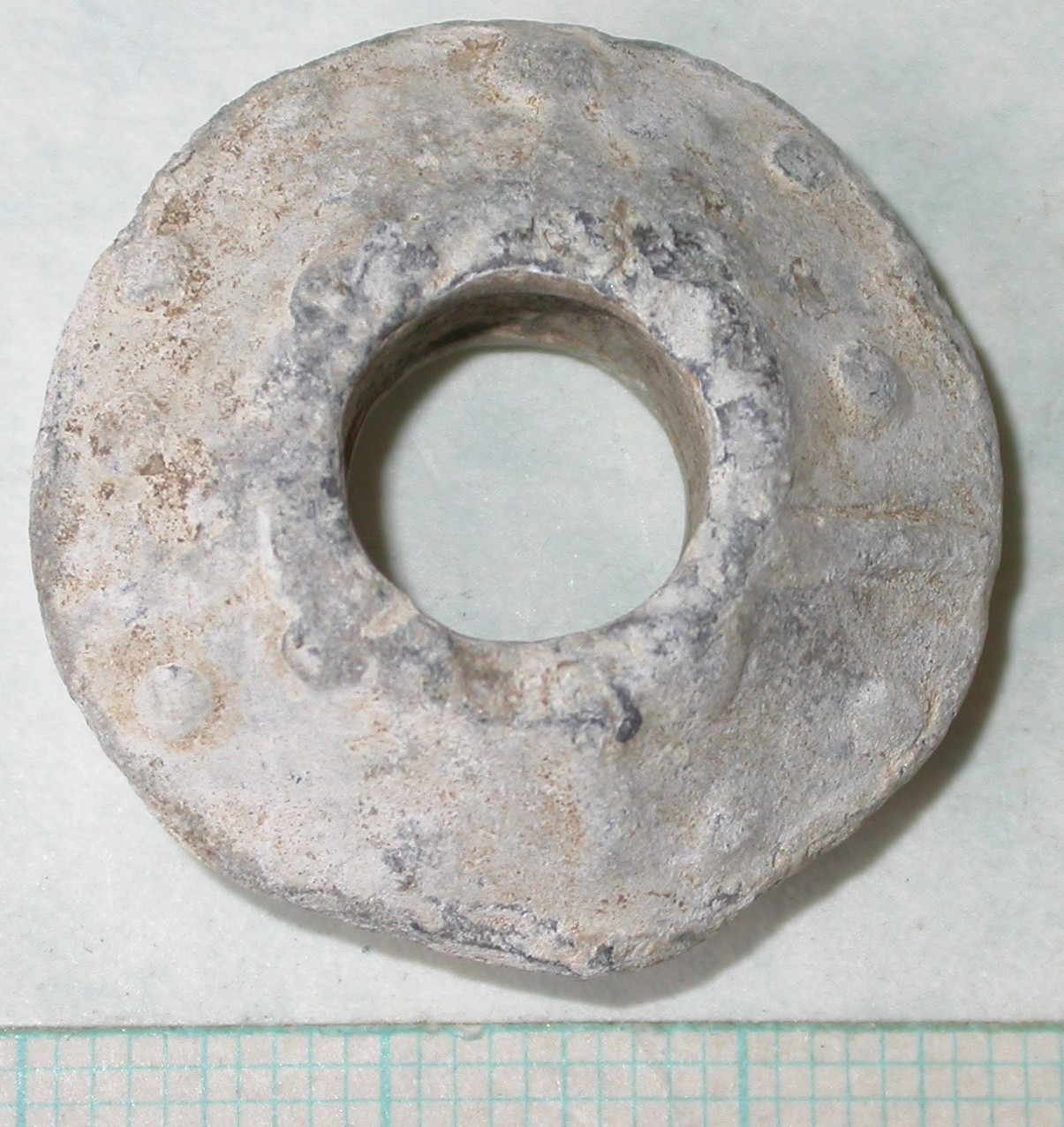
Lead spindle whorl

== See also ==
- Archaeological field survey
- Artifact (archaeology)
- Assemblage (archaeology)
- Dating methodology (archaeology)
- Excavation
- Post excavation
