= Government Legal Department =

British government organisation

Government Legal Department Welsh: Adran Gyfreithiwr y Trysorlys

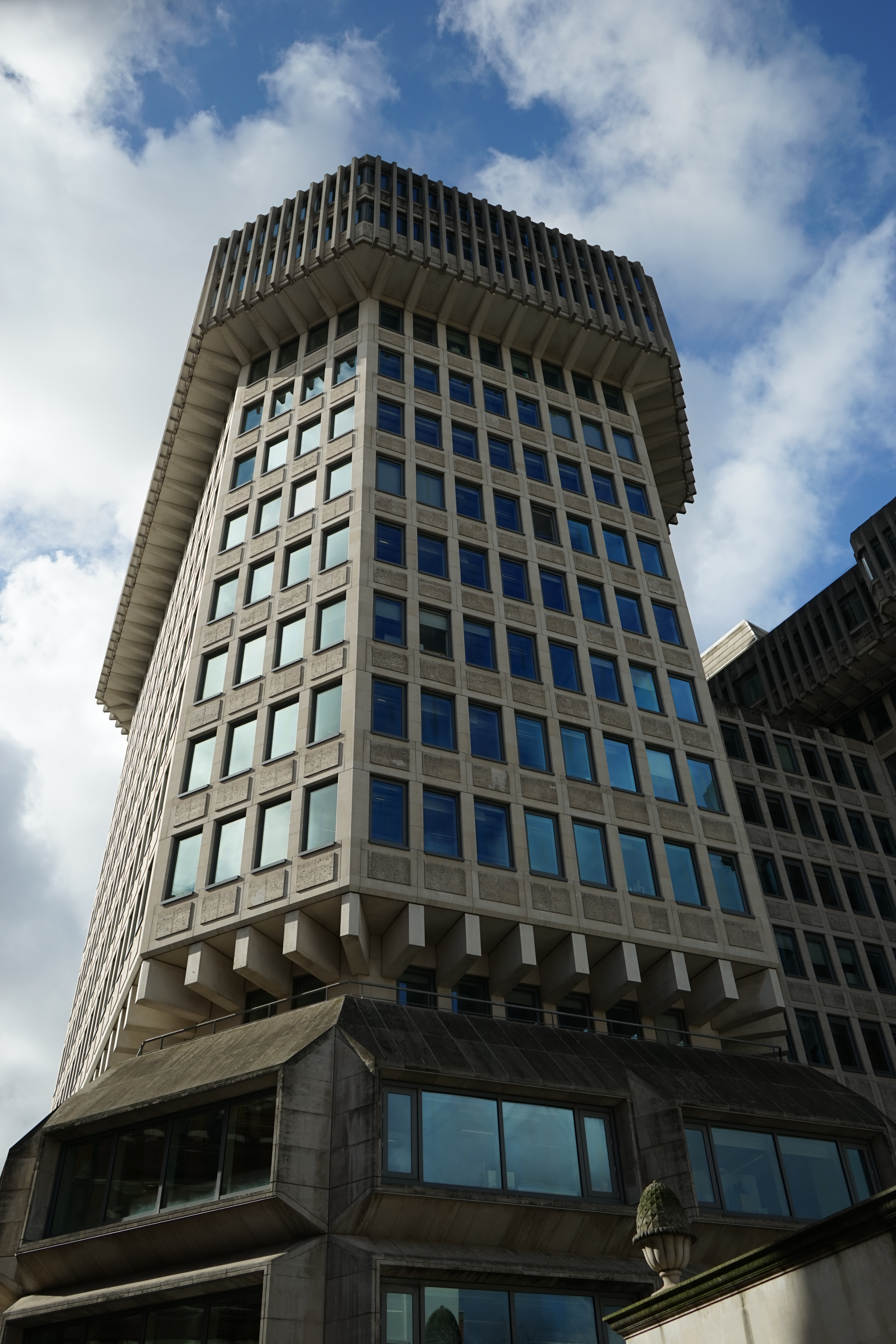

Non-ministerial government department overview
- Formed: 1876
- Jurisdiction: United Kingdom
- Headquarters: 102 Petty France, London, SW1H 9GL
- Employees: 3,400 (2023/24)
- Annual budget: £114.7 million (2009-2010)
- Ministers responsible: Ellie Reeves, Attorney General; Andy Slaughter, Solicitor General
- Non-ministerial government department executive: Douglas Wilson, HM Procurator General, Treasury Solicitor and Chief Executive
- Website: gov.uk/gld

Treasury Solicitor Act 1876 (Note: Section 10.)
- Act of Parliament
- Parliament of the United Kingdom
- Long title: An Act to incorporate the Solicitor for the affairs of Her Majesty's Treasury, and make further provision respecting the grant of administration of the Estates of deceased persons for the use of Her Majesty.
- Citation: 39 & 40 Vict. c. 18
- Territorial extent: United Kingdom

Dates
- Royal assent: 27 June 1876
- Commencement: 27 June 1876 (Note: The Acts of Parliament (Commencement) Act 1793.)
Other legislation
Repeals/revokes	Estates of Intestates, etc. Act 1852
Amended by	Statute Law Revision Act 1883; Statute Law Revision Act 1894; Duchy of Lancaster Act 1920; Statute Law Revision Act 1963; Administration of Estates Act 1971; Statute Law (Repeals) Act 1981; Statute Law (Repeals) Act 1986

Status: Amended

Text of statute as originally enacted

Revised text of statute as amended

Text of the Treasury Solicitor Act 1876 as in force today (including any amendments) within the United Kingdom, from legislation.gov.uk.

The Government Legal Department (previously called the Treasury Solicitor's Department) is the largest in-house legal organisation in the United Kingdom's Government Legal Profession.

The department is headed by the Treasury Solicitor (formally "The Solicitor for the affairs of His Majesty's Treasury"). This office goes back several centuries. The office was enshrined in law by the Treasury Solicitor Act 1876 (39 & 40 Vict. c. 18), which established the Treasury Solicitor as a corporation sole (an office with perpetual succession). Employees of the department exercise legal powers which are vested in the corporation sole.

The department is a non-ministerial government department and executive agency. The Treasury Solicitor reports to the Attorney General for England and Wales. The department employs more than 1,900 solicitors and barristers to provide advice and legal representation on a huge range of issues to many government departments.

== History ==
The department was historically known as the Treasury Solicitor's Department, but changed name to the Government Legal Department on 1 April 2015. The new name reflects a "significant period of change", during which the department doubled in size to 2,000 staff.

The head of the department combines the ancient office of King's Proctor with that of Treasury Solicitor. She has the formal title of His Majesty's Procurator General and Treasury Solicitor. The office is currently held by Dame Susanna McGibbon who succeeded Sir Jonathan Jones after his resignation on 8 September 2020. She is also the Chief Executive of the department as an executive agency.

== Functions ==
Government Legal Department lawyers work in both advisory and litigation roles. In litigation, lawyers bring and defend legal proceedings involving central government and related bodies. In advisory teams, lawyers provide advice to ministers and civil servants on both the current law and on proposed Government policies and future legislation.

The department is the authorised address for service of proceedings on most government departments, by virtue of the list published under the Crown Proceedings Act 1947.

In England (with the exception of Lancashire, Manchester and Cornwall, where the function is delegated to Farrer & Co), the Treasury Solicitor is the Crown's nominee for the collection and disposition of ownerless property (bona vacantia). This typically comprises the assets of dissolved companies and the estates of persons who die intestate and with no known kin.

== List of HM Procurators General and Treasury Solicitors ==
=== King's Proctor/Procurators General ===
The office of King's (or Queen's) Proctor is ancient; it also came to be known as HM Procurator General. The following were King's or Queen's Proctor after 1660:

- 1660–1669: Alexander Cheeke
- 1669–1700: Samuel Franklyn
- 1700–1710: Thomas Smith
- 1710–1714: George Smith
- 1714–1727: Henry Farrant
- 1727–1750: Edward Greenly
- 1750–1766: Thomas Tindal
- 1766–1783: Philip Champion de Crespigny
- 1783–1804: James Heseltine
- 1804–1815: Charles Bishop
- 1815–1844: Iltid Nicholl
- 1845–1876: Francis Hart Dyk

=== Treasury Solicitor ===
Historically, there were two solicitors in the Treasury. The first (The Solicitor for Negotiating and Looking after the Affairs of the Treasury), which existed alone until 1696, had become a sinecure by 1744, and perhaps as early as 1716; from the late 18th century the office included a salary of £200 a year. It was abolished in 1800. A second Treasury Solicitor, the precursor of the modern office, was established in 1696 and was assigned all the legal business undertaken in Westminster Hall; as the first Solicitor became a sinecure, the second Solicitor became the only one responsible for legal business. By 1786, its office-holder was carrying out legal work for other secretaries of state and the Attorney-General, and in the early nineteenth century was employed by other government departments as well. From 1794, the Solicitor was also barred from running their own private practice. The salary began at £500, increased to £1,000 in 1755 and then to £2,000 in 1794; until the 1830s, the Solicitor also charged fees for work done in departments outside the Treasury, but these were then abolished and he received an allowance of £850 in addition to his salary. The whole salary was fixed at £2,000 in 1851, and then increased to £2,500 in 1872. The following were Treasury Solicitors after 1660.

==== Treasury Solicitor (I; a sinecure by 1744 and abolished in 1800) ====
- By 1661: John Rushworth
- By 1673: Sir William Turner
- 1676–1679: John Ramsey
- 1679–1685: Thomas Lloyd
- 1685–1689: Philip Burton
- 1689–1696: Aaron Smith
- 1696–1716: Henry Baker
- 1716–1728: Philip Horneck
- 1728–1729: Edward Roome
- 1729–1737: Charles Valence Jones
- 1737–1744: Charlton Hayward
- 1744–1800: Hugh Valence Jones

==== Treasury Solicitor (II; from 1696) ====
- 1696–1700: Nicholas Baker
- 1700–1715: William Borrett
- 1715–1730: Anthony Cracherode
- 1730–1742: Nicholas Paxton
- 1742–1756: John Sharpe
- 1756–1765: Philip Carteret Webb
- 1765–1775: Thomas Nuthall
- 1775–1794: William Chamberlayne
- 1794–1806: Joseph White
- 1806–1818: Henry Charles Litchfield
- 1818–1851: George Maule
- 1851–1866: Henry Revell Reynolds
- 1866–1871: John Greenwood
- 1871–1875: John Gray
- 1875–1894: Augustus Keppel Stephenson

=== Procurators General and Treasury Solicitor ===
In 1876, Augustus Keppel Stephenson, the Treasury Solicitor, was appointed Queen's Proctor and Procurator General; since then, the offices of Procurator General and Treasury Solicitor have been held together. By 1971, the office came with a salary of £14,000 a year. The following have been jointly HM Procurator General and Treasury Solicitor:

- 1876–1894: Sir Augustus Keppel Stephenson, KCB
- 1894–1909: Hamilton Cuffe, 5th Earl of Desart
- 1909–1923: Sir John Mellor, 1st Baronet
- 1923–1926: Hon. Alfred Clive Lawrence
- 1926–1933: Sir Maurice Gwyer
- 1934–1953: Sir Thomas James Barnes
- 1953–1964: Sir Harold Simcox Kent
- 1964–1971: Sir William Arthur Harvey Druitt
- 1971–1975: Sir Henry Gabriel Ware
- 1975–1980: Sir Basil Brodribb Hall
- 1980–1984: Sir Michael James Kerry
- 1984–1988: Sir John Bilsland Bailey
- 1988–1992: Sir James Nursaw
- 1992–1995: Sir Gerald Albery Hosker
- 1995–1996: Michael Lawrence Saunders
- 1997–2000: Sir Anthony Hilgrove Hammond
- 2000–2006: Dame Juliet Wheldon
- 2006–2014: Sir Paul Christopher Jenkins
- 2014–2020: Sir Jonathan Guy Jones
- 2021–2026: Dame Susanna McGibbon
- 2026-present: Douglas Wilson

== See also ==
- Departments of the United Kingdom Government
- Treasury Devil
