= Government Legal Profession =

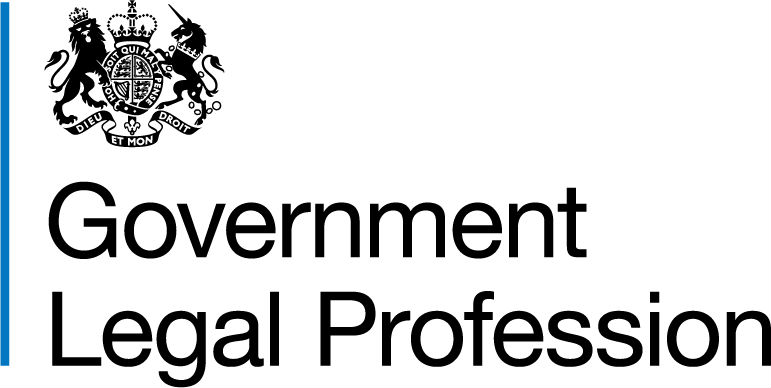

Agency overview
- Website: https://www.gov.uk/government/organisations/civil-service-government-legal-profession

The Government Legal Profession (GLP), formerly the Government Legal Service, is an umbrella group comprising around two thousand qualified lawyers working as civil servants in around thirty UK Government departments.

The Treasury Solicitor (currently Susanna McGibbon) is also the Head of the Government Legal Profession. GLP lawyers are mostly employed by the Government Legal Department, although based in other government departments, with some being directly employed by the department in which they work. The GLP brand is used primarily for recruitment purposes and offers training and support to GLP lawyers. The GLP Secretariat supports the work of lawyers across the GLP by providing central library services and for an intranet system, Legal Information Online Network, or LION, which can be accessed by all government lawyers, and gives access to commercial legal databases and information and articles relevant to government legal work.

Lawyers in the Government Legal Profession:

- instruct Parliamentary Counsel to draft almost all United Kingdom primary legislation;
- draft the vast majority of statutory instruments and secondary legislation in the UK;
- advise departments of the United Kingdom Government on the formulation and implementation of policy;
- provide litigation services to departments of the United Kingdom Government and the wider public sector;
- prior to Brexit, ensured European Union law was correctly implemented into UK law.

There are separate but similar structures in the devolved administrations, the Government Legal Service for Scotland and the Government Legal Service for Northern Ireland.
