= Stainton (surname) =

Stainton is a surname, and may refer to:

- Anthony Stainton (1913–1988), British lawyer and parliamentary draftsman
- Bob Stainton (1910–2000), English Royal Air Force officer, headmaster and cricketer
- Bryan Stainton (born 1942), English footballer
- Chris Stainton (born 1944), English musician
- David Stainton, American film and television executive
- Henry Tibbats Stainton (1822–1892), English zoologist
- Jim Stainton (1931–2009), English footballer
- John Stainton (born 1953), Australian film and television producer and director
- John Stainton (barrister) (1888–1957), British lawyer and parliamentary draftsman
- Keith Stainton (1921–2001), British politician
- Lisbee Stainton (born 1988), English singer-songwriter
- Philip Stainton (1908–1961), English actor
- Robert Stainton (born 1964), Canadian philosopher and linguist
- Ron Stainton (1909–1966), English footballer
- Sir Ross Stainton (1914–2011), chief executive of BOAC and British Airways
