= Church of All Saints, Alford =

Church in South Somerset, UK

Church of All Saints
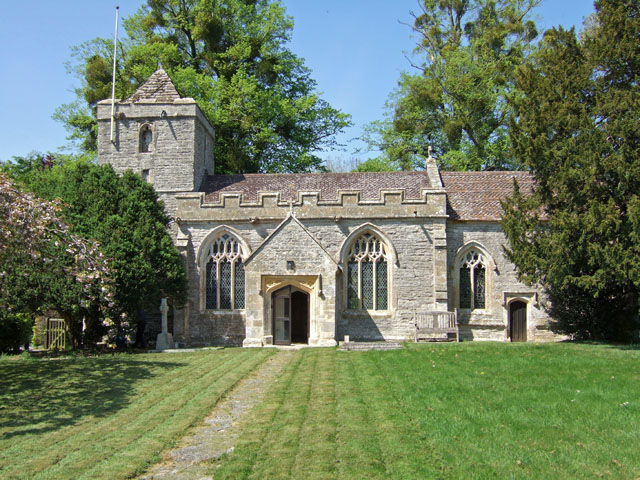

- Location within Somerset
- 51°05′29″N 2°33′58″W
- Location: Alford, Somerset, England

History
- Built: 15th century

Listed Building – Grade I
- Official name: Church of All Saints
- Designated: 24 March 1961
- Reference no.: 1056264

The Church of All Saints which is next to the River Brue in Alford, Somerset, England, dates from the 15th century, with minor 19th-century restoration. It has been designated as a Grade I listed building.

The church has a 2-bay chancel and 3-bay nave and a south porch. The 2-stage tower, which is at the west end of the church contains a bell dating from 1753 and made by Thomas Bilbie of the Bilbie family.

The fittings include a Jacobean pulpit, dated 1625, and 16th-century bench ends. The north windows have medieval stained glass including a large figure of Mary Magdalene.

The parish is part of the Six Pilgrims Benefice, which also includes Babcary, Hornblotton, Lovington, North Barrow and South Barrow and is part of Wells Archdeanery.

== See also ==
- Grade I listed buildings in South Somerset
- List of Somerset towers
- List of ecclesiastical parishes in the Diocese of Bath and Wells
