= Arthur Thring =

English lawyer, parliamentary draftsman and parliamentary clerk

Sir Arthur Theodore Thring, KCB, DL (7 February 1860 – 17 April 1932) was an English lawyer, parliamentary draftsman and parliamentary clerk.

== Career ==
Born on 7 February 1860, Arthur Theodore Thring was the third son of Theodore Thring, a "country gentleman", the deputy chairman of the Somerset Quarter Sessions and a Commissioner of Bankruptcy, and his wife Julia Jane, née Mills. His uncles included the First Parliamentary Counsel Lord Thring, the schoolmaster Rev. Edward Thring and the hymn-writer Rev. Godfrey Thring. Arthur attended Winchester College from 1872 and bowled for the school cricket team when it beat Eton College in 1878. The following year, he matriculated at New College, Oxford, as a scholar. He secured a second-class degree in classics in 1883.

Thring was called to the bar in 1887 and practised at parliamentary committees and government inquiries. He was appointed Second Parliamentary Counsel in 1902 and the following year became First Parliamentary Counsel, in which office he was responsible for drafting legislation relating to the People's Budget (1909), the National Insurance Act 1911, the Parliament Act 1911, the Representation of the People Act 1918 and many wartime bills. According to Sir Harold Kent, Lord Simon said of Thring: "Such a capable fellow, very hard-working, full of common sense ... The only trouble was, he couldn't draft!" The Times was more sympathetic, recalling that "If as a draftsman Thring will not be placed in the same rank as his famous uncle, Lord Thring, Ilbert, or Chalmers, his reputation, in times more difficult than theirs, stood the test of legal interpretation". In 1917, he became Clerk of the Parliaments, serving until retirement in 1930.

He was appointed Companion of the Order of the Bath in the November 1902 Birthday Honours list, and promoted to Knight Commander (KCB) six years later.

A Deputy Lieutenant of Somerset, Thring was also Deputy Chairman of the county's Quarter Sessions. He enjoyed shooting and spent parliamentary vacations at Charlton Mackrell. He died on 17 April 1932, leaving a widow (Georgina, née Bovill) and a son, Rear Admiral George Arthur Thring, DSO (1903–2001).

Legal offices
Preceded by Sir Mackenzie Dalzell Chalmers	Second Parliamentary Counsel; 1902–1903	Succeeded by Sir Frederick Francis Liddell
Preceded by Sir Mackenzie Dalzell Chalmers	First Parliamentary Counsel; 1903–1917	Succeeded by Sir Frederick Francis Liddell
Preceded by Sir Henry Graham	Clerk of the Parliaments; 1917–1930	Succeeded by Sir Edward Alderson
