= John Fiennes (lawyer) =

British lawyer and parliamentary draftsman

Sir John Saye Wingfield Twisleton-Wykeham-Fiennes, KCB, QC (14 April 1911 – 21 April 1996) was a British lawyer and parliamentary draftsman.

== Early life ==
Fiennes was born on 14 April 1911, the son of Gerald Yorke Twisleton-Wykeham-Fiennes and his wife Gwendolen, née Gisborne; part of the Twisleton-Wykeham-Fiennes family, on his father's side he was the great-grandson of Frederick Fiennes, 16th Baron Saye and Sele. Educated as "Founders' kin" at Winchester College (he was descended from William of Wykeham), Fiennes went up to Balliol College, Oxford, where he read classics; graduating in 1934 with a first-class degree, he won several named scholarships and the Gaisford Prize.

== Career ==
Called to the bar in 1936, Fiennes carried out pupillages under F. E. Farrer and J. Neville Gray, and then practised privately before joining the Office of the Parliamentary Counsel in 1939. His work there was considered essential to the war effort, sparing him from military service during the Second World War. From 1952 to 1958 and again from 1962 to 1966 he was responsible for drafting Finance Bills. He was appointed Second Parliamentary Counsel in 1956 and promoted to First Parliamentary Counsel in 1968, serving until retirement in 1972. Appointed a Companion of the Order of the Bath in 1953, Fiennes was promoted to Knight Commander in 1970; he was a Bencher of the Middle Temple and took silk in 1972.

Fiennes's work involved drafting several important acts, including the Companies Act 1947, the Representation of the People Act 1948, the Occupiers' Liability Act 1957, the Charities Act 1960, the Leasehold Reform Act 1967, the Theft Act 1968, the Immigration Act 1971 and the European Communities Act 1972. He spent a year away from the OPC from 1962 to 1963 to help draft Malaya's constitution and its Vagrants Act 1965. The Times called Fiennes "unquestionably the ablest draftsman of this century ... his amazing memory was stored with an encyclopaedic knowledge of the law and its history ... he was in the same class as his great Victorian predecessor Lord Thring". His ability to craft succinct legislation in plain language – like the 1957 and 1972 acts – was his strong point, although in some cases his subtle language also proved difficult to amend.

Fiennes lived in Suffolk in retirement. He died on 21 April 1996; his wife Sylvia, née McDowall, had died in 1979, but he was survived by their three children.

== Photograph ==
A black and white photographic portrait was reproduced in his obituary in The Times.

Legal offices
Preceded by Sir Noël Hutton	First Parliamentary Counsel; 1968–1972	Succeeded by Sir Anthony Stainton
Preceded by Sir Noël Hutton	Second Parliamentary Counsel; 1956–1968	Succeeded by Harold Chorley
