= Edward Thring =

British educator

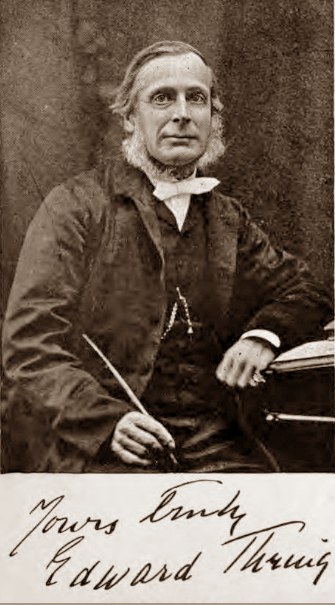
- Born: 29 November 1821; Alford, Somerset, England
- Died: 22 October 1887 (aged 65); Uppingham, Rutland, England
- Education: Eton College
- Alma mater: King's College, Cambridge
- Occupation: Educator
- Years active: 1853—1887
- Known for: Headmastership of Uppingham School; Founder of the Headmasters' Conference
- Spouse: Caroline Marie Louise Koch (m. 1853)
- Parents: Rev. John Gale Dalton Thring (father); Sarah Thring (née Jenkyns) (mother)
- Family: Theodore Thring (brother); Henry Thring (brother); Godfrey Thring (brother); John Charles Thring (brother)

Edward Thring (29 November 1821 – 22 October 1887) was a British educator. He was headmaster of Uppingham School (1853–1887) and founded the Headmasters' Conference in 1869.

== Life ==
Thring was born at Alford, Somerset, the son of the rector, the Rev John Gale Dalton Thring and Sarah née Jenkyns. He was brother of Theodore Thring (1816-1891), Henry, Lord Thring, a noted jurist and Parliamentary Counsel to the Treasury, hymn writer Godfrey Thring, and John Charles Thring, a master at Uppingham School and deviser of the Simplest Game rules for football; he also had two sisters. The family is commemorated in the Church of All Saints, Alford by carved choir seats in the chancel and two memorial windows.

Thring was educated at Eton and King's College, Cambridge, where he obtained a Fellowship in 1844. He was ordained in the Church of England in 1846 and served in various curacies until in 1853 he began his true life work by an appointment to the headmastership of Uppingham School.

Thring is Uppingham's best-known headmaster, remaining in the post until 1887. He raised the school to a high state of efficiency, and stamped it with the qualities of his own strong personality, as did Thomas Arnold at Rugby. He made many innovative changes to the school's curriculum which were later adopted in other English schools. During his headship the school was forced to move temporarily to Borth in Wales after an outbreak of typhoid ravaged the student body.

In 1869, Edward Thring formed the Headmasters' Conference after inviting thirty-seven of his fellow headmasters to meet at his house to consider establishing such an annual meeting.

He was an original thinker and writer on education and various educational works.

== Thring's methods ==
Thring was the headmaster of Uppingham between 1853 and 1887; here he turned a poor provincial grammar school of 25 boys into a top public school within ten years. Thring insisted on confining the school to around 300 boys to maintain a small, "tight-knit" Christian community. Thring believed that every boy was good for something. His early experience teaching Gloucester National elementary schools had convinced him that "to teach the slow and ignorant with success is the only test of proficiency and intellectual power." In addition to being a believer in teaching the classics, Thring broadened the overall curriculum at Uppingham by ensuring that the moral, aesthetic, and physical aspects meet the needs of the students. Although Uppingham was a huge achievement in itself, Thring's achievements extended beyond Uppingham as he was co-founder of the Headmasters' Conference (HMC) and he produced his Theory and Practice of Teaching.

== Education for the lower classes ==
Thring had a negative attitude to the education for those unable to pay fees:

You cannot break the laws of nature which have made the work and powers of men vary in value. This is what I mean when I ask why should I maintain my neighbour's illegitimate child ? I mean by illegitimate, every child brought into the world who demands more than his parents can give him, or to whom the Government makes a present of money. The School Boards are promising to be an excellent example of public robbery.

== Bibliography ==
- Skrine, John Huntley (1890). A Memory of Edward Thring. London and New York: Macmillan & Co.
- Parkin, George R. (1898). Edward Thring: Headmaster of Uppingham school. London: Macmillan.
- Rawnsley, Willingham Franklin (1904). Early days at Uppingham under Edward Thring. London: Macmillan and Co., Limited.
- Hoyland, Geoffrey (1945). The Man Who Made a School (Thring of Uppingham). SCM Press.
- Tozer, Malcolm David (1976). Physical education at Thring's Uppingham. Uppingham School.
- Tozer, Malcolm (1978). Manliness: the Evolution of a Victorian Ideal. le.ac.uk (PhD thesis). University of Leicester. hdl:2381/10370. EThOS uk.bl.ethos.475463. Archived from the original on 1 December 2017.
- Skrine, John Huntley Edward Thring: Maker of Uppingham School, Headmaster 1853-1887, London: Routledge, 2007. (ISBN 978-0415073103).
- Richardson, Nigel Typhoid in Uppingham: Analysis of a Victorian Town and School in Crisis, 1875-77, London: Pickering and Chatto, 2009. (ISBN 978-1-85196-991-3).
- Richardson, Nigel Thring of Uppingham: Victorian Educator, Buckingham: The University of Buckingham Press, 2014. (ISBN 978-1-908684-0-59).
- Tozer, Malcolm The Ideal of Manliness: The Legacy of Thring's Uppingham, Truro: Sunnyrest Books, 2015. (ISBN 978-1-326-41574-7, hardback; ISBN 978-1-329-54273-0, paperback).
- Flower, Peter, The Life and Times of a Victorian Country Doctor, a portrait of Reginald Grove Volume 2 Life at Boarding School, Brown Dog Books 2021 (ISBN 978-1-839-52206-2).

== Bibliography ==
- Chisholm, Hugh, ed. (1911). "Thring, Edward" . Encyclopædia Britannica. Vol. 26 (11th ed.). Cambridge University Press.
- "Thring, Edward" . Dictionary of National Biography. London: Smith, Elder & Co. 1885–1900.
- Leinster-Mackay, Donald P. "Thring, Edward (1821–1887)". Oxford Dictionary of National Biography (online ed.). Oxford University Press. doi:10.1093/ref:odnb/27389. (Subscription, Wikipedia Library access or UK public library membership required.)
- Edward Thring, The Theory and Practice of Teaching, 1883.
