= Frederick Francis Liddell =

British lawyer

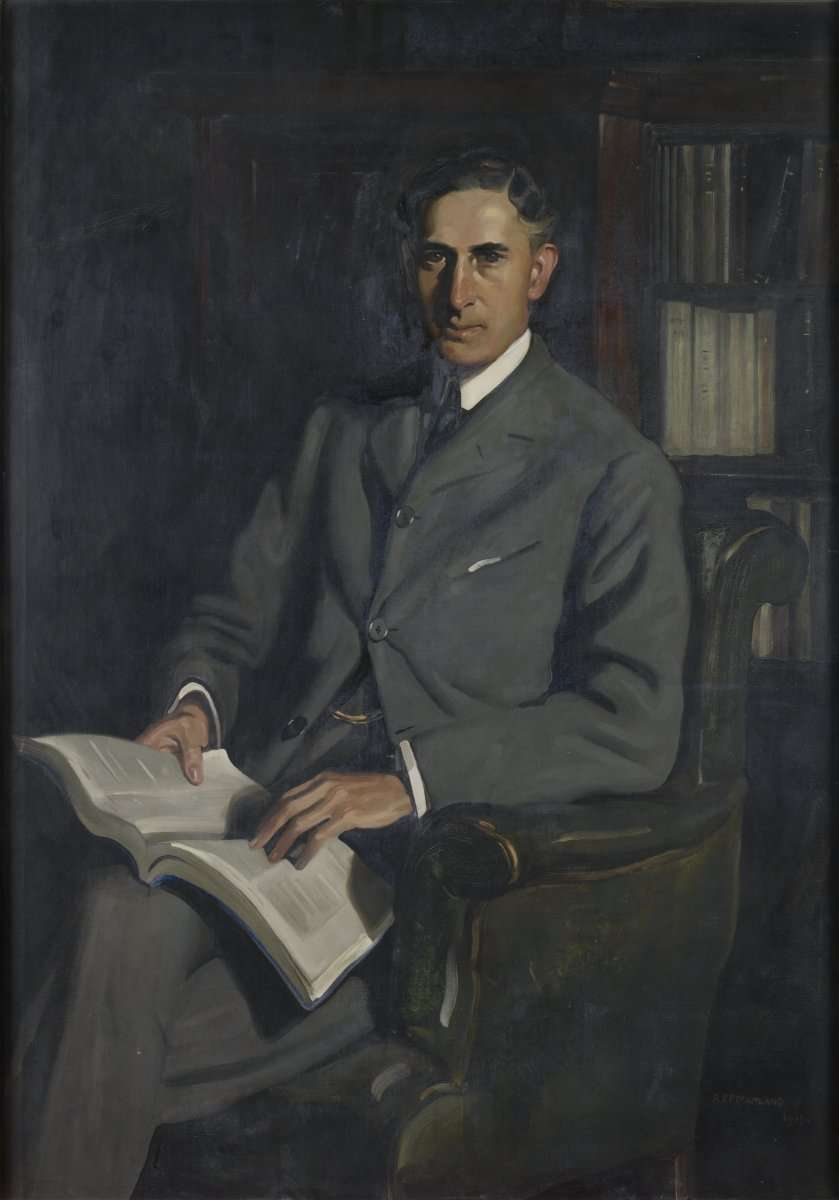

Sir Frederick Francis Liddell KCB KC (7 June 1865 – 19 March 1950) was a British lawyer and civil servant. He is noted for being First Parliamentary Counsel.

== Early life ==
He was born in 1865, the son of Henry Liddell, the Dean of Christ Church, Oxford; his older sister, Alice, would become famous as the inspiration for the 1865 novel Alice's Adventures in Wonderland. He was educated at Eton and Christ Church, Oxford, where he graduated in 1888 with first-class honours in Literae humaniores. On leaving Oxford, he was appointed the private secretary to Sir Arthur Gordon, the Governor of Ceylon; after two years, when Gordon's tenure as governor expired, he returned home. In 1891 he became a Fellow of All Souls College, Oxford, a position he would hold until 1906. He won the Eldon Scholarship in 1892 and was called to the Bar in 1894.

== Career ==
Liddell entered Charles Sargant's chambers at Lincoln's Inn, and a year later, on Sargant's advice, joined the Parliamentary Counsel's Office, then led by Henry Jenkyns and Courtenay Ilbert. In 1902, he was appointed Second Parliamentary Counsel, and after the 1906 general election played a major part in helping prepare the large amount of new legislation the Liberal government aimed to pass. In 1917 he was appointed First Parliamentary Counsel. Among his major work was assisting the drafting of plans to reform the Territorial Force and create the Royal Air Force, as well as the reorganisation of substantial parts of the criminal law and the law of property, and an attempt to reform income tax. Following Irish independence, he created the legislative framework to rework the statute law affecting Ireland and limit it to the six counties of Northern Ireland. Among his other legal work, he edited the Manual of Military Law.

In 1928, he was appointed Counsel to the Speaker, and made a KC the following year. He had intended to retire in 1939, but was asked to stay on with the outbreak of the Second World War; he eventually retired in 1943, but even then remained active, assisting with the overhaul of the Standing Orders relating to Private Members' Business. He became an Ecclesiastical Commissioner in 1944, finally retiring from public life in 1948.

He married Mabel Magniac in 1901; the couple had three sons and one daughter. One of his sons, an officer in the Royal Navy, died at sea shortly after the end of the Second World War. His youngest son, Maurice, married Alix Kerr.

== Notes ==
Legal offices
Preceded by Sir Arthur Thring	Second Parliamentary Counsel; 1903–1917	Succeeded by Sir William Graham-Harrison
Preceded by Sir Arthur Thring	First Parliamentary Counsel; 1917–1928	Succeeded by Sir William Graham-Harrison
