= Edward Hall Alderson =

Edward Hall Alderson may refer to:

- Sir Edward Alderson (judge) (1787–1857), Baron of the Exchequer
- Sir Edward Alderson (parliamentary clerk) (1864–1951), Clerk of the Parliaments and grandson of the above
