= Alan Ellis =

Alan Ellis may refer to:

- Alan Ellis (lawyer) (1890–1960), British lawyer and parliamentary draftsman
- Alan Ellis (Home and Away)
