= John Rowlatt =

British lawyer

Sir John Rowlatt, KCB, KCIE, MC, QC (19 November 1898 – 4 July 1956) was a British lawyer who served as First Parliamentary Counsel.

== Biography ==
John Rowlatt was the third son of Sidney Rowlatt, a High Court judge who presided over the a committee regarding British India. John was educated at Eton College from 1911, as a King's Scholar. He earned a number of medals and was School Captain, Newcastle Medallist and Alfred Lyttelton Scholar in 1917, his final year before going up to Christ Church, Oxford. He served in the Coldstream Guards in the First World War between 1917 and 1918, lost a leg, and was awarded the Military Cross.

After the war, he returned to Christ Church, graduating with a BA in classics in 1921. He then qualified as a lawyer, being called to the bar in 1922. He went into practice in the commercial and common law courts, until joining the Office of the Parliamentary Counsel in 1929. He became a Parliamentary Counsel in 1937, and was promoted to Second Parliamentary Counsel ten years later, and then appointed First Parliamentary Counsel in 1953, serving until his death.

He devilled (trained under) Sir Maurice Gwyer while he was drafting the Government of India Act 1935, and then travelled to India two years later to help with the establishment of the federation under the Act. On his return, he drafted (as a Parliamentary Counsel he could now draft alone) acts concerning British India from then on. After succeeding John Stainton as Second Parliamentary Counsel (which coincided with India's independence from the British Empire), Rowlatt took over responsibility for the Finance Bills, and also drafted the Transport Act 1947. As head of the OPC, he drafted the Income Tax Act 1952.

Rowlatt was appointed a Knight Commander of the Order of the Indian Empire in 1947, and of the Order of the Bath in 1954. He was appointed a Queen's Counsel in 1954. He died after collapsing at Westminster underground station on 4 July 1956. The Lord Chancellor, Lord Kilmuir, wrote a letter to The Times paying tribute to Rowlatt: "the form and lucidity of his drafting was as remarkable as the speed with which he drew his Bills ... [But] his exceptional gifts made it inevitable that his counsel should be sought on many matters of the highest importance and confidence, not necessarily connected with legislative projects".

Legal offices
Preceded by Sir Alan Ellis	First Parliamentary Counsel; 1953–1956	Succeeded by Sir Noël Hutton
Preceded by Sir John Stainton	Second Parliamentary Counsel; 1947–1953	Succeeded by Sir Noël Hutton
