= Lovington =

Lovington may refer to:

- Lovington, Illinois, United States
- Lovington, New Mexico, United States
- Lovington, Somerset, England
