= Stanley Krusin =

British lawyer and parliamentary draftsman

Sir Stanley Marks Krusin, CB (8 June 1908 – 28 April 1998) was a British lawyer and parliamentary draftsman.

== Early life and education ==
He was born in 1908, the son of Henry Krusin, a West Hampstead agent. He attended St Paul's School and then read classics at Balliol College, Oxford, where he was awarded the Ireland and Craven Scholarship in 1927.

== Career and later life ==
Called to the bar in 1932, Krusin completed pupillages in the chambers of Arthur Cole and J. H. Stamp, and then in 1933 joined the chambers of Hubert Rose, a key influence on him. In 1940, he was commissioned as a Pilot Officer in the Administrative and Special Duties Branch of the Royal Air Force Reserve. His war service involved interpreting radar sightings of enemy aircraft and predicting their movements; his commanders had decided to recruit lawyers and stockbrokers for this work, believing that they were well-trained in quick analysis. After a year, he moved to the Air Staff and eventually rose to the rank of Wing Commander.

In 1945, with the war over, he joined the British Tabulating Machine Company as its deputy secretary, but found the work less interesting than he had hoped. He contacted Noel Hutton (who had also been in Stamp's chambers) at the Office of the Parliamentary Counsel, to enquire about work, and it happened that the OPC was recruiting. He was appointed an assistant there in 1947, and promoted to senior assistant in 1949. Four years later, he was made a Parliamentary Counsel, and then in 1970 he was promoted to Second Parliamentary Counsel, serving until retirement in 1973.

While at the OPC, Krusin drafted the Town and County Planning Act 1954, the Copyright Act 1956, the Opencast Coal Act 1958, and the Industrial Relations Act 1971. He also drafted Acts of Parliament relating to the independence of a number of British colonies. Krusin was appointed a Companion of the Order of the Bath in 1963, and a Knight Bachelor on retirement.

He died on 28 April 1998, and was survived by his two children; his first wife, Frances, had died in 1972, and his second wife, Sybil, in 1988.

Legal offices
Preceded by Harold Chorley	Second Parliamentary Counsel; 1970–1973	Succeeded by Sir Henry Rowe and Terence Skemp (Jointly)
