= Henry Rowe (lawyer) =

Austrian-born British lawyer and parliamentary draftsman (1916 to 1992)

Sir Henry Peter Rowe, KCB, QC (18 August 1916 – 13 February 1992), born Heinz Peter Röhr, was an Austrian-born British lawyer and parliamentary draftsman.

== Career ==
Rowe was born Heinz Peter Röhr in Ischl, Austria, on 18 August 1916; his father, Richard, was Czech and his mother, Olga, an Austrian. In 1935, he enrolled at the University of Vienna, but he arrived at England in 1938 to read law at Gonville and Caius College, Cambridge. As an Austrian, he was interned during the Second World War, but showed signs of academic excellence in the year he had already spent at Cambridge, enough that the university awarded him a first-class degree in absentia. In 1941, he was allowed to join the Royal Pioneer Corps in a non-combatant role, and was later transferred to the 7th Armoured Division where he served as a dispatch rider and was promoted to the rank of Warrant Officer.

On demobilisation, Rowe (as he was now called) returned to the United Kingdom and recommenced his interest in law. He was called to the bar in 1947 and joined the Office of the Parliamentary Counsel soon afterwards. He spent the rest of his career in the office, and was responsible for drafting the Licensing Act 1961, the Rent Act 1965, the Scotland Act 1978, the Wales Act 1978 and the Housing Act 1980; he drafted the Finance Bill every year from 1971 to 1976. Rowe was promoted to Second Parliamentary Counsel in 1973, and First Parliamentary Counsel four years later. He retired in 1981, having been appointed a Knight Commander of the Order of the Bath in 1978, the same year he was made a Queen's Counsel.

Rowe died on 13 February 1992, leaving a widow and three children.

Legal offices
Preceded by Sir Anthony Stainton	First Parliamentary Counsel; 1977–1981	Succeeded by Sir George Engle
Preceded by Sir Stanley Krusin	Second Parliamentary Counsel; 1973–1976; With: Terence Skemp	Succeeded by Terence Skemp
