= William Graham-Harrison =

British barrister and civil servant (1871–1949)

Sir William Montagu Graham-Harrison KCB KC (born William Montagu Harrison; 4 February 1871 – 29 October 1949) was a British barrister and civil servant.

== Early life and education ==
He was born William Montagu Harrison, the son of Captain Thomas Arthur John Harrison of the Royal Artillery and his wife Mary Elizabeth (née Thompson). He was educated at Wellington College and Magdalen College, Oxford. He became a fellow of All Souls College, Oxford, in 1895.

== Career ==
Harrison was called to the bar in 1897. In 1913, he was appointed solicitor to HM Customs and Excise, Second Parliamentary Counsel in 1917, and First Parliamentary Counsel in 1928, holding the post until his retirement in 1933. He took silk in 1930 and was appointed Chancellor of the Diocese of Durham in 1934, the Diocese of Truro in 1935, the Diocese of Gloucester in 1937, and the Diocese of Portsmouth in 1938. He retired from all except Gloucester in 1940; he remained at Gloucester until his death.

Graham-Harrison was appointed Companion of the Order of the Bath (CB) in the 1920 New Year Honours and Knight Commander of the Order of the Bath (KCB) in the 1926 Birthday Honours.

== Family ==
In 1900, Harrison married Violet Evelyn Cecilia Graham, elder daughter of Sir Cyril Clerke Graham, 5th Baronet. He changed his surname to Graham-Harrison. They had two sons and one daughter.

== Footnotes ==
Legal offices
| Preceded by Sir Frederick Francis Liddell | Second Parliamentary Counsel; 1917–1928 | Succeeded by Sir Granville Ram |
| Preceded by Sir Frederick Francis Liddell | First Parliamentary Counsel; 1928–1933 | Succeeded by Sir Maurice Gwyer |
