= Church of St Thomas of Canterbury, Lovington =

Church in Somerset, England

Church of St Thomas of Canterbury
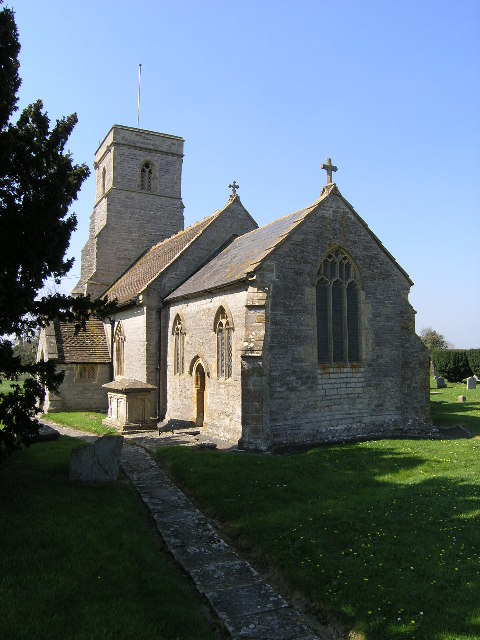

- Location within Somerset
- 51.0754°N 2.5771°W
- Location: Lovington, Somerset, England

History
- Built: 13th century

Listed Building – Grade II*
- Official name: Church of St Thomas of Canterbury
- Designated: 24 March 1961
- Reference no.: 1056528

The Church of St Thomas of Canterbury in Lovington, Somerset, England, was built in the 13th century. It is a Grade II* listed building.

== History ==
The church was built in the 13th century and underwent Victorian restoration in 1861.

The parish is part of the Six Pilgrims benefice within the Diocese of Bath and Wells.

== Architecture ==
The stone building has Doulting stone dressings and slate or clay tile roofs. It consists of a three-bay nave, two-bay chancel and north aisle. The three-stage tower is supported by corner buttresses. There are three bells in the tower dating from the 15th and 17th centuries.

The majority of fittings in the church are from the 19th century but it does have door arches, a piscina and ambry surviving from the original building.

In the churchyard is an early 17th century chest tomb to the Danyell family.

== See also ==
- List of ecclesiastical parishes in the Diocese of Bath and Wells
