= Terence Skemp =

British lawyer and parliamentary draftsman

Terence Rowland Frazer Skemp, CB, QC (14 February 1915 – 15 March 1996) was a British lawyer and parliamentary draftsman.

== Early life, education and war service ==
Born in 1915 in British India, Skemp's father, Frank Whittingham Skemp, was a judge. After attending Charterhouse School, he went up to Christ Church, Oxford, where he read law, was jointly awarded the Boulter Exhibition in Law in 1935, and then graduated with second-class honours in 1936. After being rejected for a job in the Indian Civil Service, he decided to take up a career in law. He was called to the bar at Gray's Inn in 1938, and carried out pupillages in the chambers of Sir John Foster. At the outbreak of the Second World War, he enlisted with the Royal Armoured Corps and was commissioned as an officer; he suffered a severe leg wound in 1945 which ended his war service.

== Career, later life and honours ==
The post-war Labour government's legislative programme was enabled by expanding the Office of the Parliamentary Counsel, which drafted bills. Skemp was recruited by the OPC in 1946, and promotions followed to Deputy Parliamentary Counsel in 1963, then Parliamentary Counsel the next year. In 1973, he was appointed Second Parliamentary Counsel, serving until retirement in 1980. For the first three years, he held the office jointly with Henry Rowe (later Sir Henry), who went on to be First Parliamentary Counsel (Skemp had been considered for the role, but the decision to advance Rowe was due partly to Skemp's heart condition). After leaving the OPC in 1980, he then spent five years as Counsel to the Speaker.

Skemp drafted a number of important Acts of Parliament, including the Firearms Act 1965, the Docks and Harbours Act 1966, the Criminal Justice Act 1967, the Race Relations Act 1968, the Trade Union and Labour Relations Act 1974, the Patents Act 1977, and the Companies Act 1980. He was also responsible for the Local Government Act 1972, which was the longest bill presented to Parliament up to that point.

Skemp was appointed a Companion of the Order of the Bath in the 1973 Birthday Honours, and took silk in 1984. He died on 15 March 1996, aged 85, and was survived by his three children (from his marriage to Dorothy, née Pringle) and his partner Sandra, a graduate of Somerville College, Oxford, with whom he had lived for some years after separating from his wife.

Legal offices
Preceded by Sir Stanley Krusin	Second Parliamentary Counsel; 1973–1980; With: Sir Henry Rowe (1973–1976)	Succeeded by Sir George Engle
