= Peter Graham (barrister) =

British lawyer and parliamentary draftsman (1934–2019)

Sir Peter Graham KCB QC (7 January 1934 – 20 October 2019) was a British lawyer and parliamentary draftsman.

== Early life and education ==
Graham was born in Huddersfield, Yorkshire, where his father, Alderman Douglas Graham CBE was Mayor in 1966–67. He was educated at St Bees School in Cumberland. After service in the Fleet Air Arm (1952–55), he went up to St John's College, Cambridge to read law, graduating with a BA in 1957 and a postgraduate LLB in 1958, the same year that he was called to the bar.

== Career ==
He joined the Office of the Parliamentary Counsel the following year, and was promoted to Second Parliamentary Counsel in 1987 and then First Parliamentary Counsel in 1991, serving until retirement in 1994. He was responsible for drafting over a hundred Acts of Parliament, including legislation relating to the United Kingdom's ratification of the Maastricht Treaty (1992), the privatisation of British Rail (1993), the National Lottery etc. Act 1993, and the Sunday Trading Act 1994.

Graham was appointed a Companion of the Order of the Bath in the 1982 Birthday Honours, and promoted to Knight Commander in the 1993 Birthday Honours. He took silk in 1990.

Legal offices
Preceded by Sir Henry de Waal	First Parliamentary Counsel; 1991–1994	Succeeded by Sir Christopher Jenkins
Preceded by Sir Henry de Waal	Second Parliamentary Counsel; 1987–1991	Succeeded by Sir Christopher Jenkins
