= Church of St Peter, South Barrow =

Church in Somerset, England

Church of St Peter
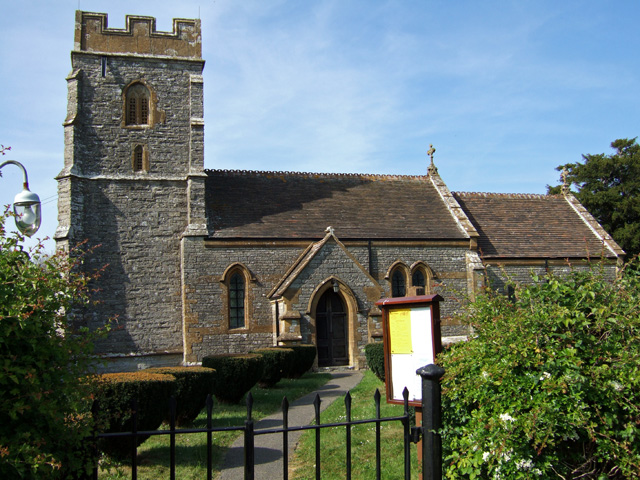

- Location within Somerset
- 51.0490°N 2.5694°W
- Location: South Barrow, Somerset, England

History
- Built: 14th century

Listed Building – Grade II*
- Official name: Church of St Peter
- Designated: 24 March 1961
- Reference no.: 1258889

The Anglican Church of St Peter in South Barrow, Somerset, England was built in the 14th century. It is a Grade II* listed building.

== History ==
The church was probably built in the 14th century or earlier. In 1850 a Victorian restoration included the addition of the chancel.

The church was not very busy but a conversion, funded by £20,000 form the Somerset Community Foundation, has made the interior more flexible so that it can be used for a variety of community purposes.

The parish is part of the Six Pilgrims benefice within the Diocese of Bath and Wells.

== Architecture ==
The stone building has clay tile roofs. It consists of a three-bay nave and two-bay chancel supported by buttresses. The two-stage tower is also buttressed.

Although there are still 13th or 14th century arches visible most of the interior is from the 19th century. The altar table, pulpit and sexton's desk are 17th century. The font has the date 1584 on it.

A brass plaque in the church commemorates the men from the village who died in World War I.

== See also ==
- List of ecclesiastical parishes in the Diocese of Bath and Wells
