= Office of the Parliamentary Counsel (United Kingdom) =

UK government body

- Crest used by the Office of the Parliamentary Counsel as of November 2023

Department overview
- Formed: 8 February 1869
- Headquarters: 1 Horse Guards Road, London
- Employees: Approximately 60
- Department executive: Jessica de Mounteney, First Parliamentary Counsel
- Parent department: Cabinet Office
- Website: Official website on gov.uk

The Office of the Parliamentary Counsel (OPC) is responsible for drafting all government bills introduced to the Parliament of the United Kingdom. Established in 1869, the OPC is part of the Cabinet Office and led by the First Parliamentary Counsel, Jessica de Mounteney. The lawyers who work in the office are referred to as Parliamentary counsel.

== History ==
Bills were originally drafted by barristers, Members of Parliament or members of the judiciary. William Pitt was the first person to appoint a dedicated parliamentary draftsman, known as the Parliamentary Counsel to the Treasury, who in 1833 described his duties as "to draw or settle all the Bills that belong to Government in the Department of the Treasury", although he also produced bills for other departments. Despite this many bills continued to be drafted by other barristers, and one of these barristers (Henry Thring) suggested that "the subjects of Acts of Parliament, as well as the provisions by which the law is enforced, would admit of being reduced to a certain degree of uniformity; that the proper mode of sifting the materials and of arranging the clauses can be explained; and that the form of expressing the enactments might also be the subject of regulation". In response to this, the Office of the Parliamentary Counsel to the Treasury was established on 8 February 1869, with Thring as Parliamentary Counsel to the Treasury, the head of the office.

In 1901 the office consisted of "the Parliamentary Counsel and the Assistant Parliamentary Counsel, with three shorthand writers, an office-keeper, and an office boy". Two more Parliamentary Counsel were appointed in 1914 and 1930 respectively, and by 1960 the office had 16 counsel, along with their support staff. In 2009 it consisted of 47 counsel, with a 13-person support team.

The OPC was initially part of HM Treasury, but when the Civil Service Department was created in 1969 the OPC became a part of it, changing its name from Office of the Parliamentary Counsel to the Treasury to simply the Office of the Parliamentary Counsel. After the Civil Service Department was dissolved in 1980, the OPC became part of the Cabinet Office.

== Duties ==
In addition to drafting government bills, the OPC also:

- prepares government amendments to bills,
- liaises with Parliamentary authorities on behalf of the Government,
- drafts or reviews some subordinate legislation, where its expertise is called for,
- produces guidance on drafting and other matters related to legislating (available on gov.uk), and
- advises the Government on legal, Parliamentary and constitutional questions falling within its expertise.

== List of First Parliamentary Counsel ==
- Henry Thring, 1st Baron Thring (1869–1886)
- Sir Henry Jenkyns (1886–1899)
- Sir Courtenay Ilbert (1899–1902)
- Sir Mackenzie Dalzell Chalmers (1902–1903)
- Sir Arthur Thring (1903–1917)
- Sir Frederick Francis Liddell (1917–1928)
- Sir William Graham-Harrison (1928–1933)
- Sir Maurice Gwyer (1933–1937)
- Sir Granville Ram (1937–1947)
- Sir Alan Ellis (1947–1953)
- Sir John Rowlatt (1953–1956)
- Sir Noël Hutton (1956–1968)
- Sir John Fiennes (1968–1972)
- Sir Anthony Stainton (1972–1977)
- Sir Henry Rowe (1977–1981)
- Sir George Engle (1981–1987)
- Sir Henry de Waal (1987–1991)
- Sir Peter Graham (1991–1994)
- Sir Christopher Jenkins (1994–1999)
- Sir Edward Caldwell (1999–2002)
- Sir Geoffrey Bowman (2002–2006)
- Sir Stephen Laws (2006–2012)
- Sir Richard Heaton (2012–2015)
- Dame Elizabeth Gardiner (2015–2024)
- Jessica de Mounteney (2024–present)

== Second Parliamentary Counsel ==
- 1869–1886: Sir Henry Jenkyns
- 1886–1899: Sir Courtenay Ilbert
- 1899–1902: Sir Mackenzie Dalzell Chalmers
- 1902–1903: Sir Arthur Thring
- 1903–1917: Sir Frederick Francis Liddell
- 1917–1928: Sir William Graham-Harrison
- 1929–1937: Sir Granville Ram
- 1937–1946: Sir John Stainton
- 1947–1953: Sir John Rowlatt
- 1953–1956: Sir Noël Hutton
- 1956–1968: Sir John Fiennes
- 1968–1969: Harold Chorley
- 1970–1973: Sir Stanley Krusin
- 1973–1980: Terence Skemp
- 1973–1976: Sir Henry Rowe (jointly)
- 1980–1981: Sir George Engle
- 1981–1986: Sir Henry De Waal
- 1987–1991: Sir Peter Graham
- 1991–1994: Sir Christopher Jenkins
- 1994–1996: David Saunders
- The title was then not in use publicly from at least 2000 to Cook's appointment in 2007 (see Civil Service Yearbook).
- 2007–2022: David Cook
- 2024–present: Andrew Scott

== See also ==
- Parliamentary Counsel
