= Geoffrey Bowman =

British lawyer (born 1946)

Sir Edwin Geoffrey Bowman, KCB, KC (Hon) (born 27 January 1946), commonly known as Sir Geoffrey Bowman, is a British lawyer and retired parliamentary draftsman.

== Early life and education ==
Born in 1946, Bowman attended Roundhay School before he went up to Trinity College, Cambridge, graduating in 1967 with a BA in law, and then completing a postgraduate LLB the following year.

== Career and honours ==
Called to the bar by Lincoln's Inn in 1968, he practised privately for three years before joining the Office of the Parliamentary Counsel in 1971. He was promoted to be a Parliamentary Counsel in 1984, and between 2002 and 2006 he served as First Parliamentary Counsel, the head of the OPC (permanent secretary grade). He had previously been seconded to the Law Commission for England and Wales and drafted the Sale of Goods Act 1979 and the Magistrates' Courts Act 1980. On retiring, it emerged that Bowman's pension was worth £2.6m, among four public-sector "pension pots" worth over £2m in 2006.

Bowman was appointed a Companion of the Order of the Bath in the New Years Honours 1991, and was promoted to Knight Commander of the Order in 2004. He was made an honorary Queen's Counsel on retirement in 2006. He became a bencher at Lincoln's Inn in 2002, and received an honorary Doctor of Laws degree from the School of Advanced Study at the University of London in 2007.

Legal offices
Preceded by Sir Edward Caldwell	First Parliamentary Counsel; 2002–2006	Succeeded by Sir Stephen Laws
