= George Engle =

Sir George Engle

First Parliamentary Counsel
- In office 1981–1987
- Preceded by: Sir Henry Rowe
- Succeeded by: Sir Henry de Waal

Personal details
- Born: George Lawrence Jose Engle; 13 September 1926 Brussels, Belgium
- Died: 14 September 2016 (aged 90)

Sir George Lawrence Jose Engle KCB QC (13 September 1926 – 14 September 2016) was a British barrister and First Parliamentary Counsel between 1981 and 1987.

Engle was a contemporary at Charterhouse (where he was in Hodgsonites) of Gerald Priestland, William Rees-Mogg and Simon Raven. He was a distinguished scholar, being Head of School and editor of The Carthusian school magazine.

Before going up to Christ Church, Oxford to read Mods and Greats, Engle completed his National Service in the Royal Artillery. He took a double-First degree. Although he considered becoming an academic philosopher, he opted for the law, being called to the Bar in 1953 from Lincoln's Inn and taking a post with the Office of the Parliamentary Counsel in 1957, drafting government bills. He was seconded to Nigeria to draft legislation in 1965 until 1967. Engle was appointed C.B. in 1976, and K.C.B. in 1983 having become First Parliamentary Counsel in 1981. Engle was also appointed Queen's Counsel in 1983, and Bencher of Lincoln's Inn in 1984. Retiring in 1986, he retained an interest in legislation as a member of the Hansard Society's commission on the legislative process. Engle was a founder of the Commonwealth Association of Legislative Counsel.

Engle was noted for a vast library, containing, alongside major works, very obscure books. He was president of the Kipling Society from 2001 to 2008. He died 14 September 2016, survived by his wife of sixty years, Irene (née Lachmann; sister of immunologist Sir Peter Lachmann), three daughters, and grandchildren. Both Engle and his wife were Jewish.

Legal offices
Preceded by Sir Henry Rowe	First Parliamentary Counsel; 1981–1987	Succeeded by Sir Henry de Waal
Preceded by Terence Skemp	Second Parliamentary Counsel; 1980–1981	Succeeded by Sir Henry de Waal
