= Stephen Laws =

British civil servant

Sir Stephen Charles Laws, KCB, KC (born 28 January 1950) is a British lawyer and civil servant who served as the First Parliamentary Counsel between 2006 and 2012.

Laws read law at Bristol University, graduating in 1972. He was the first in his family to go to university. After a year lecturing at Bristol, Laws was called to the bar at Middle Temple, and following pupillage and a brief period practising, he joined the Home Office in 1975 as a legal assistant. He transferred to the Office of the Parliamentary Counsel the next year, and excepting two secondments to the Law Commission, stayed there until his retirement, rising first to Deputy Parliamentary Counsel in 1985, and then Parliamentary Counsel in 1991. He replaced Sir Geoffrey Bowman as First Parliamentary Counsel in 2006.

As head of the Office of the Parliamentary Counsel, Laws was responsible for the drafting of all the government legislation which is laid before Parliament. Alongside the Treasury Solicitor and the Director of Public Prosecutions, Laws was one of the three most senior lawyers in the Civil Service. He undertook his LLB at Bristol University, graduating in 1972, and was thus the first non-Oxbridge graduate to hold the office.

Laws was appointed a CB in the 1996 New Year Honours. He was promoted to KCB in 2011.

On retiring as First Parliamentary Counsel in 2012, Laws was asked in an interview for Civil Service World whether he had been a victim of nominative determinism. He replied that his choice of career was more influenced by his father's interest in the law, but conceded that "hereditary nominative determinism" may have been at work.

Laws is currently a senior research fellow at Policy Exchange's Judicial Power Project.

== See also ==
- Nominative determinism

Legal offices
Preceded by Sir Geoffrey Bowman	First Parliamentary Counsel; 2006–2012	Succeeded by Sir Richard Heaton
