= Hundred of Catsash =

Historical Hundred of Somerset, England

Catsash
- Area
- 25,300 acres (10,200 ha)
- History
  - Created: unknown
- Status: Hundred
- Subdivisions
  - Type: Parishes
  - Units: Alford, Ansford, Babcary, North Barrow, South Barrow, St. David Barton, North Cadbury, South Cadbury, Castle Cary, Compton Pauncefoot, Keinton Mansfield, Kingweston, Lovington, West Lydford, Maperton, Queen Camel, Sparkford, Sutton Montis, and Weston Bampfield

The Hundred of Catsash is one of the 40 historical Hundreds in the ceremonial county of Somerset, England, dating from before the Norman conquest during the Anglo-Saxon era although exact dates are unknown. Each hundred had a 'fyrd', which acted as the local defence force and a court which was responsible for the maintenance of the frankpledge system. They also formed a unit for the collection of taxes. The role of the hundred court was described in the Dooms (laws) of King Edgar while the name of the hundred was normally that of its meeting-place.

The hundred of Blachethorna described in the Domesday Book roughly equates to the later Hundred of Catsash.

The Catsash hundred covered an area of approximately 25,300 acres (10,200 ha). It consisted of the ancient parishes of: Alford, Ansford, Babcary, North Barrow, South Barrow, St. David Barton, North Cadbury, South Cadbury, Castle Cary, Compton Pauncefoot, Keinton Mansfield, Kingweston, Lovington, West Lydford, Maperton, Queen Camel, Sparkford, Sutton Montis, and Weston Bampfield.

The importance of the hundred courts declined from the seventeenth century. By the 19th century several different single-purpose subdivisions of counties, such as poor law unions, sanitary districts, and highway districts sprang up, filling the administrative role previously played by parishes and hundreds. Although the Hundreds have never been formally abolished, their functions ended with the establishment of county courts in 1867 and the introduction of districts by the Local Government Act 1894.
