= Elizabeth Gardiner =

British Civil servant

Dame Elizabeth Gardiner DCB KC (Hon)
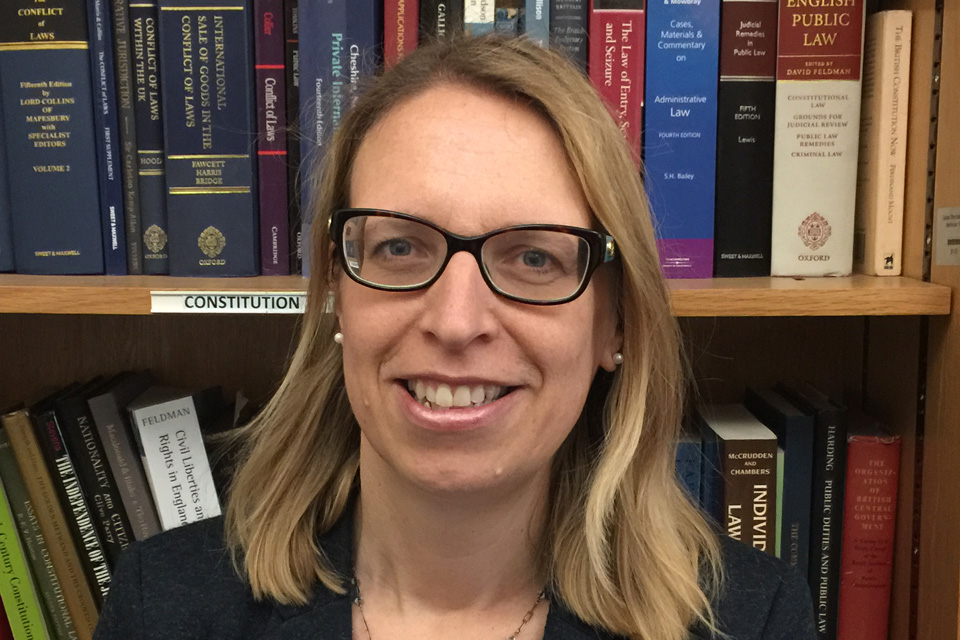

First Parliamentary Counsel
- In office 24 November 2015 – April 2024
- Prime Minister: David Cameron; Theresa May; Boris Johnson; Elizabeth Truss; Rishi Sunak
- Preceded by: Richard Heaton

Personal details
- Born: 19 March 1966 (age 60)

Dame Elizabeth Anne Finlay Gardiner DCB KC (Hon) (born 19 March 1966) is a British solicitor and senior civil servant who served as the First Parliamentary Counsel from November 2015 until 2024.

After education at the University of Edinburgh and working as a solicitor in Scotland Gardiner has worked at the Office of the Parliamentary Counsel since 1991, and as a director-general-graded Parliamentary Counsel from 2003 until her promotion in 2015, where she succeeded Richard Heaton. As of September 2015, as a Director-General Gardiner was paid a salary of between £175,000 and £179,999, making her one of the 328 most highly paid people in the British public sector at that time.

Gardiner was appointed Companion of the Order of the Bath (CB) in the 2013 Birthday Honours and Dame Commander of the Order of the Bath (DCB) in the 2021 Birthday Honours for services to government and the legislative process.

In January 2019, Gardiner became the Civil Service Champion for the Civil Service Retirement Fellowship. In 2020 she was appointed as an honorary Queen's Counsel.

Government offices
Preceded by Richard Heaton	First Parliamentary Counsel; 24 November 2015 - April 2024	Succeeded by Jessica de Mounteney
