= Henry de Waal =

Sir Constant Hendrik de Waal, KCB, QC (1 May 1931 – 1 October 2016), known as Sir Henry de Waal, was a British-Dutch-Austrian lawyer and parliamentary draftsman.

== Biography ==
=== Early life and education ===
De Waal was born in 1931 to Hendrik de Waal and Elizabeth, née von Ephrussi; his brother was Victor de Waal, dean of Canterbury, and his cousins included Hugo de Waal, bishop suffragan of Thetford and principal of Ridley Hall, Cambridge. He attended Tonbridge School between 1944 and 1948, and then Pembroke College, Cambridge, graduating with a BA in law in 1951, and then a postgraduate LLB the following year. A Dutch citizen, he was naturalised as a British subject in January 1953, and called to the bar at Lincoln's Inn later in the year; he was a Cassel Scholar at the Inn.

=== Career ===
De Waal was a fellow of Pembroke College, Cambridge, between 1958 and 1960, when he joined the Office of the Parliamentary Counsel. Aside from two years with the Law Commission (between 1969 and 1971), he remained at the OPC until 1991, serving as a parliamentary counsel from 1971, before being promoted to Second Parliamentary Counsel in 1981 and First Parliamentary Counsel in 1987. He left that office in 1991, and became counsel to the Law Commission. He retired in 1996, by which time he had been appointed a Knight Commander of the Order of the Bath and a bencher of Lincoln's Inn (both in 1989), a Queen's Counsel (in 1988), and an honorary fellow of Pembroke College, Cambridge.

=== Death ===
De Waal died on 1 October 2016, leaving behind a widow and two children.

Legal offices
Preceded by Sir George Engle	First Parliamentary Counsel; 1987–1991	Succeeded by Sir Peter Graham
Preceded by Sir George Engle	Second Parliamentary Counsel; 1981–1986	Succeeded by Sir Peter Graham
