= Edward Caldwell =

British lawyer and retired parliamentary draftsman

Sir Edward George Caldwell, KCB (born 21 August 1941) is a British lawyer and retired parliamentary draftsman.

== Early life and career ==
Born in 1941, Caldwell attended Clifton College and Worcester College, Oxford, graduating with a second-class BA in jurisprudence in 1963. He worked for the Law Commission between 1967 and 1969, before joining the Office of the Parliamentary Counsel in 1969. He was promoted to be a Parliamentary Counsel in 1981, and then First Parliamentary Counsel in 1999, serving until retirement in 2002.

Caldwell was appointed a Companion of the Order of the Bath in the 1990 New Year Honours, and promoted to Knight Commander in the 2002 New Year Honours. He was made an honorary Queen's Counsel in 2002 and an honorary bencher of the Inner Temple three years later.

Legal offices
Preceded by Sir Christopher Jenkins	First Parliamentary Counsel; 1999–2002	Succeeded by Sir Geoffrey Bowman
