= Godfrey Thring =

- Born: Godfrey Thring; 25 March 1823; Alford, Somerset, England
- Died: 13 September 1903 (aged 80); Shamley Green, Surrey, England
- Education: Shrewsbury School
- Alma mater: Balliol College, Oxford
- Occupations: Clergyman; Hymn writer
- Parents: Rev. John Gale Dalton Thring (father); Sarah Thring (née Jenkyns) (mother)
- Family: Theodore Thring (brother); Henry Thring (brother); Edward Thring (brother); John Charles Thring (brother)

Godfrey Thring (25 March 1823 – 13 September 1903), was an Anglican clergyman and hymn writer.

== Life ==
Godfrey Thring was born at Alford, Somerset, the son of the rector, Rev. John Gale Dalton Thring and Sarah née Jenkyns. He was brother of Theodore Thring (1816–91), Henry, Lord Thring (1818–1907) (a noted jurist and Parliamentary Counsel to the Treasury), Edward Thring (headmaster of Uppingham School) and John Charles Thring (a master at Uppingham School and deviser of the Uppingham Rules), and two sisters. The family is commemorated in Alford Church by carved choir seats in the chancel and two memorial windows.

He was educated at Shrewsbury School and graduated in 1845 from Balliol College, Oxford with a BA. He was ordained in the Anglican Church.

In May 1855, Godfrey Thring was part of a tour led by James Finn, the British Consul in Jerusalem going East of the River Jordan. Finn never names any of his companions. However, his name appears in unpublished letters by Reverend Henry Stobart.

In 1858 his father united the benefices of Alford and Hornblotton by an Act of Parliament styled the "Thrings Estate Bill" and Godfrey became his father's curate. He built Hornblotton Rectory for Godfrey in 1867.

Godfrey commissioned the architect Thomas Graham Jackson to build new churches at Hornblotton and Lottisham, and became, in Jackson's words, "one of my best and most valued friends". Jackson created for him a remarkable little church, rich in the Arts and Crafts style and strikingly decorated in sgraffito work.

Thring died in 1903 and was buried in Shamley Green, Surrey, England.

== Service ==
- Curate of Stratfield-Turgis 1846–50
- Curate of Strathfieldsaye 1850–53
- Unknown parishes 1853–58
- Rector of Alford with Hornblotton, Somerset 1867–76
- Prebendary of East Harptree, Wells Cathedral 1867 (Contemporaries include Ken and Edward Hayes Plumptre)

The town of Lovington, Somerset's history gives us a glimpse into the character of Thring:

But for the generosity of the Thring family a century ago the school would have gone short of books and materials for needlework and other necessities. The Rev Godfrey Thring worked constantly for the good of the children. He presented the school with a harmonium on which he could play his compositions and get the children to sing the hymns that he wrote.

== Published works ==
Thring's poetry books include Hymns Congregational and Others, 1866; Hymns and Verses, 1866; Hymns and Sacred Lyrics, 1874, A Church of England Hymn-book Adapted to the Daily Services of the Church throughout the Year, 1880; and a revised Church of England Hymn Book in 1882.

He wrote many hymns including "The radiant morn has passed away" (set to music by Herbert Hall Woodward) and "Fierce raged the tempest o'er the deep". Although Matthew Bridges (1800–94) wrote the original verses to "Crown Him with Many Crowns", Thring added more verses. It is possible they met, but there is no record of them having done so. Both men are usually listed as the writers.
