= Mackenzie Dalzell Chalmers =

British judge and civil servant

Sir Mackenzie Dalzell Edwin Stewart Chalmers KCB CSI (7 February 1847 – 22 December 1927) was a British judge and civil servant. He was Parliamentary Counsel to the Treasury, a judge of the county courts and a Law Member of the Viceroy's Council in India. Chalmers also served as Permanent Under-Secretary of State at the Home Office from 1903 to 1908.

His mother was Matilda, the daughter of Rev. William Marsh. He was educated at King's College London, and Trinity College, Oxford.

Chalmers is best remembered today as the draftsman of the Bills of Exchange Act 1882, and in 1888 of the Sale of Goods Act 1893. The original Bill was settled by Lord Herschell who introduced it into the House of Lords in 1889, with a view to obtaining criticism of its provisions. The Bill was referred to a select committee consisting of Lord Herschell, the Earl of Halsbury, Baron Bramwell and Lord Watson. The 1893 Act was repealed and re-enacted as the Sale of Goods Act 1979. Sir Mackenzie is also known for drafting the Marine Insurance Act 1906, which is still in force.

He was appointed as Chief Justice of Gibraltar in 1894.

== Works ==
- Chalmers, M. D. (1890), The Sale of Goods including the Factors Act 1889, London: Clowes and Sons

Legal offices
Preceded by Sir Courtenay Ilbert	First Parliamentary Counsel; 1902–1903	Succeeded by Sir Arthur Thring
