= Suma Chakrabarti =

British civil servant (born 1959)

Sir Suma Chakrabarti KCB
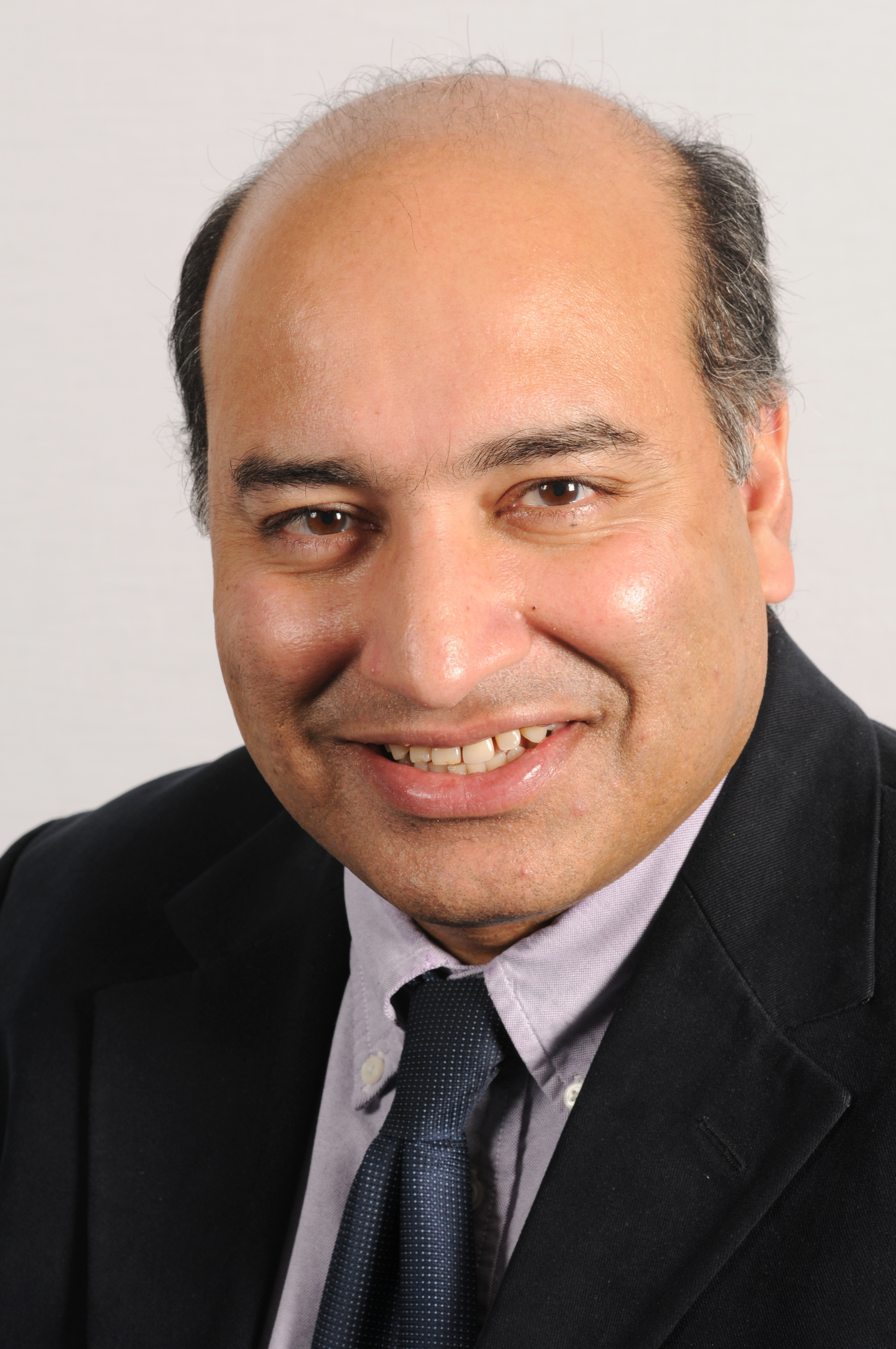

President of the European Bank for Reconstruction and Development
- In office 3 July 2012 – July 2020
- Preceded by: Thomas Mirow
- Succeeded by: Jürgen Rigterink (Acting)

Clerk of the Crown in Chancery Permanent Secretary to the Ministry of Justice
- In office December 2007 – 2012
- Prime Minister: Gordon Brown; David Cameron
- Minister: Jack Straw; Ken Clarke
- Preceded by: Alex Allan
- Succeeded by: Ursula Brennan

Personal details
- Born: 1959 (age 66–67) Jalpaiguri, West Bengal, India
- Education: University of Oxford

Sir Sumantra "Suma" Chakrabarti KCB (born 1959) is a British former civil servant who served as president of the European Bank for Reconstruction and Development (EBRD) from July 2012 to July 2020. He was previously the highest ranking Indian in Britain's civil service, serving as Permanent Secretary to the Ministry of Justice and Clerk of the Crown in Chancery from late 2007 until 2012. Since 2026, he is Richard von Weizsäcker Fellow at the Robert Bosch Academy in Berlin.

== Early life and education ==
Chakrabarti was born in 1959 in Jalpaiguri, West Bengal, India. He was educated at City of London School; New College, Oxford (BA in Philosophy, Politics, and Economics); and the University of Sussex (MA in Development Economics).

== Career in the civil service ==
Chakrabarti joined the UK's Overseas Development Administration (ODA), the predecessor to the Department for International Development, in 1984 as a senior economic assistant working on macroeconomics issues and UK aid projects. He previously worked in Botswana on an Overseas Development Institute Fellowship. He was seconded by the UK government to the International Monetary Fund and the World Bank in the 1980s. On returning to the ODA in London, he became Private Secretary to the Conservative Lynda Chalker, then Minister of State for Overseas Development based at the Foreign Office. Chakrabarti subsequently became Head of Aid Policy and Resources.

He moved to H.M. Treasury in 1996 before taking a Cabinet Office post responsible for creating the new central Performance and Innovation Unit to support the Prime Minister, Tony Blair, co-ordinating reviews of long-term issues that cross public sector institutional boundaries. Still in the Cabinet Office, he headed the Economic and Domestic Affairs Secretariat, also maintaining a foot in the then Department of Transport, Local Government and the Regions.

In 2001, returning to the Department for International Development (DfID), the successor body to the ODA, Chakrabarti became DfID Director-General for Regional Development Programmes, managing 1,200 staff in Africa, Asia, Eastern Europe, the Caribbean and Latin America. On 8 December 2009, he gave evidence to The Iraq Inquiry, discussing preparations for the 2003 invasion of Iraq.

From 2007 to 2012, he served as a Permanent Secretary (senior civil servant) to the UK's Ministry of Justice. During that period, he also held office as Clerk of the Crown in Chancery, and, as such, was responsible for the running of the Crown Office, under the directions of the Lord Chancellor. He was appointed on 15 November 2007.

== President of the EBRD ==
Chakrabarti served two full terms as president from 2012 to 2020. In his last weeks as EBRD President, Chakrabarti made a number of think tank appearances where he discussed the current state of international development and its principal actors.

== Later career ==
By the end of his term at EBRD, Chakrabarti denied any immediate plans to return to the UK civil service.

On July 2, 2020, ODI announced the appointment of Chakrabarti as its next Chair of the Board of Trustees. Also in 2020, he was appointed by the World Health Organization’s Regional Office for Europe to serve as a member of the Pan-European Commission on Health and Sustainable Development, chaired by Mario Monti.

Chakrabarti serves as deputy chairman of the Council for Reforms for the Republic of Kazakhstan.

He is also an adviser to the President of the Republic of Uzbekistan on economic development, good governance and international cooperation.

== Personal life ==
Chakrabarti is married and has one daughter.

== Offices held ==
Government offices
Preceded by John Vereker	Permanent Secretary of the Department for International Development; 2002–2008	Succeeded by Minouche Shafik
Preceded by Alex Allan; Permanent Secretary of the Department for Constitutional Affairs	Permanent Secretary of the Ministry of Justice; 2008–2012	Succeeded by Ursula Brennan
Civic offices
Preceded by Thomas Mirow	President of the European Bank for Reconstruction and Development; 2012–2020	Succeeded by Odile Renaud-Basso; President
