= Christopher Jenkins (lawyer) =

British lawyer and retired parliamentary draftsman

Sir James Christopher Jenkins, KCB, KC (Hon) (20 May 1939 – 29 December 2025) was a British lawyer and former parliamentary draftsman.

Born in 1939, Jenkins attended Lewes County Grammar School and Magdalen College, Oxford, graduating with a first-class BA in jurisprudence in 1961. He worked at Slaughter and May between 1962 and 1967, and was admitted a solicitor in February 1965. He joined the Office of the Parliamentary Counsel in 1967, and was promoted to be a Parliamentary Counsel in 1978, the Second Parliamentary Counsel in 1991 and then First Parliamentary Counsel in 1994, serving until retirement in 1999. Jenkins was appointed a Companion of the Order of the Bath in the 1987 Birthday Honours, and promoted to Knight Commander in the 1999 Birthday Honours. He was made an honorary Queen's Counsel in 1994. He died 29 December 2025.

Legal offices
Preceded by Sir Peter Graham	First Parliamentary Counsel; 1994–1999	Succeeded by Sir Edward Caldwell
Preceded by Sir Peter Graham	Second Parliamentary Counsel; 1991–1994	Succeeded by David Saunders
