= Maperton =

Village in Somerset, England

Coordinates: 51.0369°N 2.4648°W

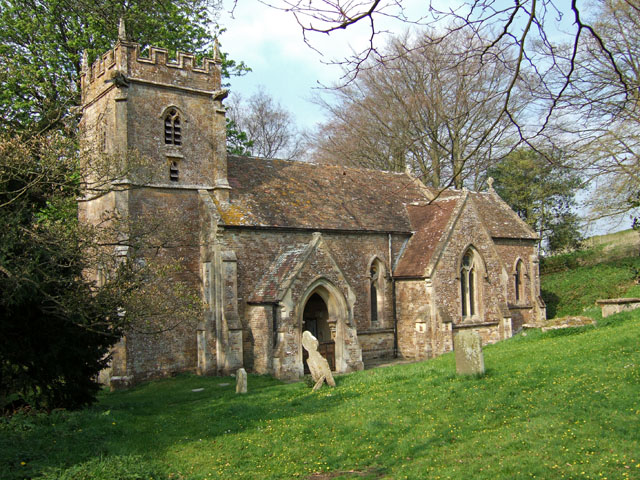
- Church of St Peter and St Paul. Maperton

- Location within Somerset
- Population: 140 (2011)
- OS grid reference: ST675265
- Unitary authority: Somerset
- Ceremonial county: Somerset
- Region: South West
- Country: England
- Sovereign state: United Kingdom
- Post town: WINCANTON
- Postcode district: BA9
- Dialling code: 01963
- Police: Avon and Somerset
- Fire: Devon and Somerset
- Ambulance: South Western
- UK Parliament: Glastonbury and Somerton

Maperton is a village and civil parish in Somerset, England, situated 3 miles (4.8 km) south west of Wincanton in the South Somerset district. The village has a population of 140. However, this small number includes Elliscombe House care home which alone has an average of 40 residents.

== History ==
The name of the village means maple settlement and is pronounced Mayperton. This pronunciation is particularly used by newer residents but many older residents use the alternative pronunciation "map-er-ton". In the Domesday Book of 1086 the manor is recorded as held by Turstin FitzRolf. The manor was held by Francis Hastings of North Cadbury around 1600.

The parish was part of the hundred of Catsash.

Earthworks show the site of a village, with a village pond, and ridge and furrow agriculture from the Middle Ages south of Wyke Champflower.

Maperton House was built in the 19th century, but incorporates some 18th-century fragments from a previous manor house which stood on the same site. (Not to be confused with Mapperton House, seat of the Earls of Sandwich, near Beaminster in Dorset.)

== Governance ==
Maperton is grouped with Holton and North Cheriton as the North Vale Group Parish. The parish council has responsibility for local issues, including setting an annual precept (local rate) to cover the council's operating costs and producing annual accounts for public scrutiny. The parish council evaluates local planning applications and works with the local police, district council officers, and neighbourhood watch groups on matters of crime, security, and traffic. The parish council's role also includes initiating projects for the maintenance and repair of parish facilities, as well as consulting with the district council on the maintenance, repair, and improvement of highways, drainage, footpaths, public transport, and street cleaning. Conservation matters (including trees and listed buildings) and environmental issues are also the responsibility of the council.

For local government purposes, since 1 April 2023, the parish comes under the unitary authority of Somerset Council. Prior to this, it was part of the non-metropolitan district of South Somerset (established under the Local Government Act 1972). It was part of Wincanton Rural District before 1974.

It is also part of the Glastonbury and Somerton county constituency represented in the House of Commons of the Parliament of the United Kingdom. It elects one Member of Parliament (MP) by the first past the post system of election.

== Religious sites ==
The Anglican parish Church of St Peter and St Paul has a tower dating from the late 15th century, with the remainder of the church being rebuilt in 1869 by Henry Hall. It has been designated as a Grade II listed building. It was a favourite venue for clandestine weddings in the early 18th century.

Due to deterioration of the red clay tile roof, the church has been placed on the Heritage at Risk Register.
