= Henry Thring, 1st Baron Thring =

British lawyer and civil servant

The Right Honourable The Lord Thring KCB
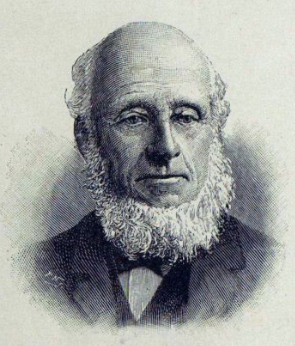
- Lord Thring, c. 1907

First Parliamentary Counsel to the Treasury
- In office 1869–1886
- Preceded by: Inaugural holder
- Succeeded by: Sir Henry Jenkyns

Parliamentary Counsel to the Home Office
- In office 1861–1869
- Preceded by: Walter Coulson
- Succeeded by: Office abolished

Personal details
- Born: Henry Thring; 3 November 1818 Alford, Somerset
- Died: 4 February 1907 (aged 88)
- Spouse: Elizabeth Cardwell (after 1856)
- Relations: Godfrey Thring (brother); Edward Thring (brother); Arthur Thring (nephew)
- Children: Katharine Annie Thring
- Parent(s): Rev. John Gale Dalton Thring; Sarah Jenkyns
- Education: Shrewsbury School
- Alma mater: Magdalene College, Cambridge

Henry Thring, 1st Baron Thring KCB (3 November 1818 – 4 February 1907), was a British lawyer and civil servant.

== Early life ==
Henry was born in Alford, Somerset on 3 November 1818. He was the second son of Sarah (née Jenkyns) Thring (1791–1891) and the Rev. John Gale Dalton Thring (1784–1874), the Rector of Alford and later rural Dean for Cary. Among his siblings were John Charles Thring, Theodore Thring, a Commissioner of Bankruptcy; the schoolmaster Rev. Edward Thring, the hymn-writer Rev. Godfrey Thring and the cricketer and barrister Theodore Thring.

His maternal grandfather was Rev. John Jenkyn of Evercreech, Somerset. His nephew Arthur also served as First Parliamentary Counsel from 1903 to 1917 and was knighted in 1908.

He was educated at Shrewsbury School and Magdalene College, Cambridge.

== Career ==
Thring was appointed First Parliamentary Counsel when that office was established in 1869, a position he held until 1886. He became known for his role as a parliamentary draftsman and as an innovator in the framing of legislation. Thring was appointed a Companion of the Order of the Bath (CB) in 1872, and promoted to Knight Commander (KCB) in 1873.

In 1886, he was raised to the peerage as Baron Thring, of Alderhurst in the County of Surrey. He was a regular contributor in the House of Lords until 1905. Apart from his career in Parliament he also served on the Council of the Royal College of Music.

== Personal life ==
In 1856, he married Elizabeth Cardwell (1822–1897), a daughter of John Cardwell, Esq. Together, they were the parents of one daughter:

- Hon. Katharine Annie Thring (1861–1947) who did not marry.

Lord Thring, who lived at 5 Queen's Gate Gardens, SW, died in February 1907, aged 88. Upon his death, the barony became extinct.

Government offices
New office	First Parliamentary Counsel to the Treasury; 1869–1886	Succeeded by Sir Henry Jenkyns
Preceded by Walter Coulson	Parliamentary Counsel to the Home Office; 1861–1869	Office abolished (Some functions vested in the Legal Adviser to the Home Office)
Peerage of the United Kingdom
New creation	Baron Thring; 1886–1907	Extinct
