= Ursula Brennan =

British civil servant

Dame Ursula Brennan DCB
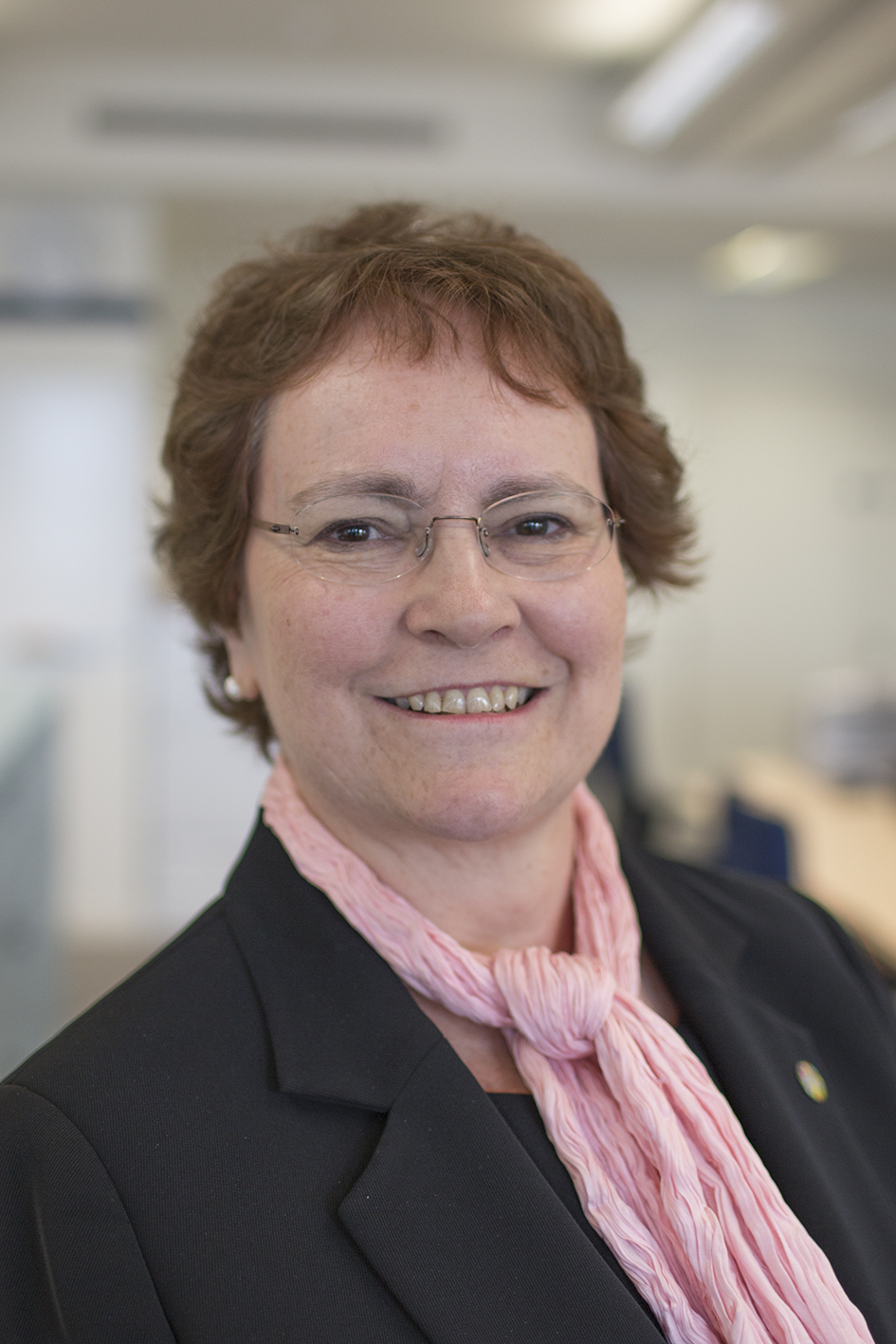

Clerk of the Crown in Chancery Permanent Secretary at the Ministry of Justice
- In office July 2012 – July 2015
- Prime Minister: David Cameron
- Preceded by: Sir Suma Chakrabarti
- Succeeded by: Richard Heaton
- Minister: Ken Clarke; Chris Grayling; Michael Gove

Permanent Secretary at the Ministry of Defence
- In office November 2010 – June 2012
- Preceded by: William Jeffrey
- Succeeded by: Jon Thompson

Personal details
- Born: 28 October 1952 (age 73) Sevenoaks, Kent
- Education: University of Kent (BA 1973)

Dame Ursula Brennan DCB (born 28 October 1952) is a retired British civil servant and a former Permanent Secretary at the United Kingdom's Ministry of Justice where she was also the Clerk of the Crown in Chancery.

Since 1975, Brennan has worked for myriad government agencies, including the Department of Health, the Department of Social Security, the Department for Work and Pensions, the Ministry of Defence, and the Department for Environment, Food and Rural Affairs.

During her career, she has been an outspoken proponent of the need for gender equality.

For her public service, Brennan was appointed Dame Commander of the Order of the Bath in 2013.

== Early life and education ==
Brennan was born in Sevenoaks, Kent, and was educated at Putney High School in London. She attended the University of Kent in Canterbury, where she earned a degree in English and American Literature.

Following university, Brennan worked at the Inner London Education Authority from 1973 to 1975.

== Civil service ==
=== Department of Health ===
In 1975, Brennan began work with the Department of Health and Social Security (which became the Department of Health in 1988). She worked several positions in the health division before joining the social security division, where she worked on disability benefits policy from 1990 to 1993. Brennan moved into operations, becoming director of the department's IT Services Agency from 1993 to 1995. From 1995 to 1997, she was disability policy director at the Department of Social Security. After that she became director of Change Management at the department's Benefits Agency, where she oversaw a staff of more than 1,000 employees. She was appointed director-general of the Department for Work and Pensions in 1999.

=== Department for Environment, Food and Rural Affairs ===
From 2004 to 2006, Brennan served as the director-general of the Living Land and Seas division at the Department for Environment, Food and Rural Affairs (Defra). Her responsibilities included leadership of the protection of wildlife and the countryside, and leadership of the division's strategy for rural disadvantage. She led the merging and creation of two new non-departmental public bodies, the restructuring delivery of grants and advice to rural business, and the implementation of a review of rural delivery.

=== Ministry of Justice ===
In 2006 and 2007, Brennan was chief executive of the Office for Criminal Justice Reform, a now defunct office that supported joint cooperation among the three criminal justice departments and criminal justice agencies.

Brennan led the review to create a new structure for the Ministry of Justice, where she worked from April to September 2008 as director-general of Corporate Performance. Her area of responsibility encompassed leadership of the corporate functions in the Ministry, including finance, IT, human resources, strategy and planning, communications, and research and analysis.

=== Ministry of Defence ===
In October 2008, Brennan joined the Ministry of Defence as Second Permanent Under-Secretary. She was appointed Permanent Secretary of the Ministry of Defence in October 2010, replacing Sir William Jeffrey.

As Permanent Secretary, Brennan's responsibilities included acting as joint chief operating officer of the department, responsible for organisation and management, along with Chief of the Defence. She was also principal accounting officer for the Department of Defence, and as such was accountable to Parliament for the efficient and effective use of department resources.

During her time at the Ministry of Defence, Brennan made headlines when she stated in 2011 that the British military needed to do more to integrate women into the higher ranks, saying, "They need to get on with it, and promote some women... (Women) are not going to hit the nuclear trigger button by mistake."

She also oversaw the 2011 investigation into the conduct of then Minister of Defence Liam Fox, who had allowed his friend Adam Werritty to join him on foreign missions, attend official diplomatic meetings and, despite having no security clearance, visit him repeatedly at the Ministry office.

=== Return to Ministry of Justice ===
On 12 June 2012, it was announced by Sir Bob Kerslake, Head of Civil Service, that Brennan would return to the Ministry of Justice as Permanent Secretary and Clerk of the Crown in Chancery. She replaced Sir Suma Chakrabarti, who left to become president of the European Bank for Reconstruction and Development.

In an interview in July 2012, Brennan spoke again about the need for gender equity in the workplace, saying, "The representation of women at the top levels of the civil service has really changed, but I've worked in departments where even when we got to several women on the board, it just takes a couple of departures and it's gone. You really need a relentless focus as you can think you have won the battle and then you find it's too easy to slip back."

Brennan retired from the civil service at the end of July 2015. She was succeeded as Permanent Secretary by Richard Heaton.

== Other positions ==
She also served on the Honours Committee, a Cabinet Office committee that nominates citizens for the monarch's Birthday and New Year's Honours.

== Honours ==
In 2011, Brennan earned an honorary Doctorate of Civil Law from her alma mater. In the 2013 New Year Honours, she was appointed Dame Commander of the Order of the Bath (DCB) "for public service."

== Offices held ==
Government offices
Preceded by Sir Ian Andrews	Second Permanent Secretary of the Ministry of Defence; 2008–2010	Succeeded by Sir Jon Day
Preceded by Sir Bill Jeffrey	Permanent Secretary of the Ministry of Defence; 2010–2012	Succeeded by Jon Thompson
Preceded by Sir Suma Chakrabarti	Clerk of the Crown in Chancery; Permanent Secretary at the Ministry of Justice; 2012–2015	Succeeded by Richard Heaton
