= Granville Ram =

Anglo-Irish lawyer (1885–1952)

Sir Lucius Abel John Granville Ram, KCB, QC, JP (24 June 1885 – 23 December 1952), commonly known as Sir Granville Ram, was an Anglo-Irish lawyer and parliamentary draftsman.

== Early life ==
Ram was born in Belgravia on 24 June 1885; his father, John Abel Ram, KC, practised at the parliamentary bar and specialised in local government matters; his mother, Mary Grace, was the daughter of the Irish peer Lucius O'Brien, 13th Baron Inchiquin. After schooling at Eton, Ram went up to Exeter College, Oxford, and graduated in 1909; he then spent a year as a pupil in H. A. McCardie's chambers before being called to the bar in 1910. He was commissioned into the Hertfordshire Yeomanry in 1910, and served in Egypt, Gallipoli and France with them during the First World War, rising to the rank of Captain.

== Career ==
With the war over, in 1919 he entered the civil service without competition and was appointed a junior solicitor to the Ministry of Labour. He succeeded Clive Lawrence as the Ministry's solicitor in 1923 and two years later joined the Office of the Parliamentary Counsel as Third Parliamentary Counsel; he was promoted to Second Parliamentary Counsel in 1929 but was overlooked when Sir Maurice Gwyer was appointed from outside the office as First Parliamentary Counsel in 1933. Ram was, however, promoted when Gwyer resigned in 1937 and served as First Parliamentary Counsel until his own retirement in 1947.

Ram's work in the OPC encompassed a range of important acts. He was responsible for drafting the Trade Disputes Act 1927; under Gwyer, he was allowed to draft a number of acts alone, including the Unemployment Act 1934 and the Public Order Act 1936; he worked with his superior on the Abdication Act 1936, which allowed Edward VIII to abdicate. As First Parliamentary Counsel, he drafted wartime legislation, most notably the Emergency Powers (Defence) Act 1940, and the landmark Education Act 1944; for the first two years of the Attlee government, Ram was responsible for overseeing its sweeping reforms turned into legislation. His 1945 memorandum on the eponymous Ram doctrine has become a famous explanation of the UK government's common law powers. He was also keen to reform and consolidate statute law and, on retirement from the OPC in 1947, he served until his death as Chairman of the Statute Law Committee and was responsible for 29 consolidation acts after the committee was given new powers to recommend minor amendments.

According to Jason Tomes writing in the Oxford Dictionary of National Biography, Ram was "perhaps less scholarly and certainly more rumbustious than the typical parliamentary counsel"; he ran the OPC like his own chambers, and was defensive of his staff to outside criticism, but could be highly critical himself, if also keen to help their careers. The "dominant figure" in the OPC for many years, he was appointed a Companion of the Order of the Bath in 1931 and promoted to Knight Commander seven years later. Outside of the OPC, Ram was a magistrate for Hertfordshire from 1923, and was Chairman of the county's Quarter Sessions from 1946 until his death. He was appointed a King's Counsel in 1943 and served as a Church Commissioner after 1948. He died on 23 December 1952, leaving a widow (Elizabeth, daughter of E. A. Mitchell-Innes, CBE) and five children.

Legal offices
Preceded by Sir William Graham-Harrison	Second Parliamentary Counsel; 1928–1937	Succeeded by Sir John Stainton
Preceded by Sir Maurice Gwyer	First Parliamentary Counsel; 1937–1947	Succeeded by Sir Alan Ellis
