= Harold Chorley =

British lawyer and parliamentary draftsman (1912 to 1990)

Charles Harold Chorley, CB (10 June 1912 – 22 December 1990) was a British lawyer and parliamentary draftsman.

Born in 1912, he was the son of Arthur R. Chorley (died 1918) of Leeds. He was educated at Trinity College, Oxford, and graduated with a BA in 1933. Called to the bar the next year, he joined the Office of the Parliamentary Counsel in 1938, and was appointed a Parliamentary Counsel in 1950. Promotion to Second Parliamentary Counsel followed in 1968, but Chorley retired the following year. He had been appointed a Companion of the Order of the Bath in 1959.

Chorley died on 22 December 1990; he was survived by his two children, but his wife had predeceased him (dying in 1980).

Legal offices
Preceded by Sir John Fiennes	Second Parliamentary Counsel; 1968–1969	Succeeded by Sir Stanley Krusin
