= Alford, Somerset =

Village in Somerset, England

Coordinates: 51.08°N 02.57°W

Alford
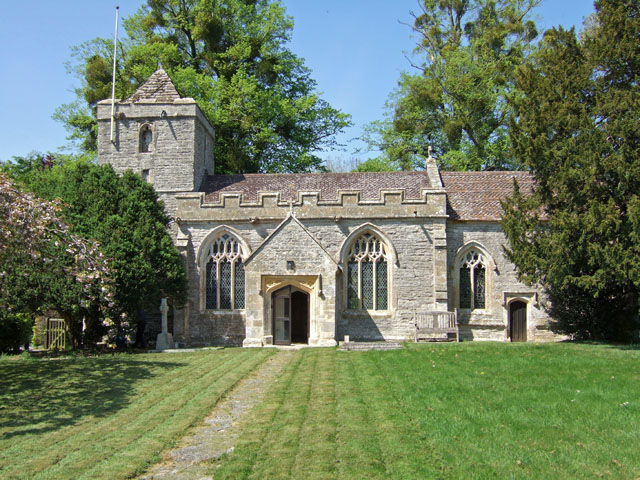
- All Saints Church, Alford

- Location within Somerset
- Population: 63 (2011)
- OS grid reference: ST6032
- Unitary authority: Somerset Council
- Ceremonial county: Somerset
- Region: South West
- Country: England
- Sovereign state: United Kingdom
- Post town: Castle Cary
- Postcode district: BA7
- Dialling code: 01963
- Police: Avon and Somerset
- Fire: Devon and Somerset
- Ambulance: South Western
- UK Parliament: Glastonbury and Somerton

Alford is a village and parish on the River Alham, in Somerset, England, situated 8 miles (12.9 km) south of Shepton Mallet and two miles west of Castle Cary. The village has a population of 63.

== History ==
The parish was part of the hundred of Catsash.

William Rosewell purchased the manor from Sir James FitzJames c. 1563 and it was inherited by subsequent generations: William Rosewell of Forde Abbey (1563–1593); and Sir Henry Rosewell (1593–1656). In 1634 Henry and his wife Mary (Drake) conveyed the manor to Simon Court, who before 1639 sold it to Sir Robert Gorges of Redlynch.

Alford House was built in the late 18th century, but remodelled by F. C. Penrose in 1877.

A chalybeate spring was at Alford Well Farm. It was visited by Celia Fiennes in 1698; she remarked that "it's a quick purger". It was reported as "disused" in 1848 and as "now neglected" in 1870.

== Governance ==
The parish council has responsibility for local issues, including setting an annual precept (local rate) to cover the council's operating costs and producing annual accounts for public scrutiny. The parish council evaluates local planning applications and works with the local police, district council officers, and neighbourhood watch groups on matters of crime, security, and traffic. The parish council's role also includes initiating projects for the maintenance and repair of parish facilities, as well as consulting with the district council on the maintenance, repair, and improvement of highways, drainage, footpaths, public transport, and street cleaning. Conservation matters (including trees and listed buildings) and environmental issues are also the responsibility of the council.

For local government purposes, since 1 April 2023, the village comes under the unitary authority of Somerset Council. Prior to this, it was part of the non-metropolitan district of South Somerset, which was formed on 1 April 1974 under the Local Government Act 1972, having previously been part of Wincanton Rural District.

It is also part of the Glastonbury and Somerton county constituency represented in the House of Commons of the Parliament of the United Kingdom. It elects one Member of Parliament (MP) by the first past the post system of election, and was part of the South West England constituency of the European Parliament prior to Britain leaving the European Union in January 2020, which elected seven MEPs using the d'Hondt method of party-list proportional representation.

== Transport ==
Alford Halt on the Great Western Railway's Langport and Castle Cary Railway was opened on 21 July 1905, three weeks after the line was opened as far as Charlton Mackrell, to serve the village of Alford. A siding was opened for military goods traffic on 15 September 1940. The halt closed on 10 September 1962.

The packhorse bridge over the River Alham, close to its junction with the River Brue, has a span of approximately 45 feet (14 m) and is medieval in origin.

== Church ==
The Church of All Saints dates from the 15th century, with minor 19th-century restoration. The tower contains a bell dating from 1753 and made by Thomas Bilbie of the Bilbie family. It has been designated by English Heritage as a Grade I listed building.

== Notable people ==
- Edward Thring, (1821–1887), educator
- Godfrey Thring (1823–1903), Anglican hymn-writer
