= John Stainton (barrister) =

Sir John Armitage Stainton, KCB, KBE, QC (29 February 1888 – 6 September 1957) was a British lawyer and parliamentary draftsman.

== Career ==
Stainton was born on 29 February 1888 to John Prout Stainton. After schooling at Winchester College, he went up to Christ Church, Oxford, to read classics. After graduating in 1911, he was called to the bar in 1913 and practised on the Western Circuit. He served in the First World War, being commissioned into the 4th Battalion of the Argyll and Sutherland Highlanders in 1915. He was wounded and ended the war as a captain. With demobilisation he returned to his legal practice, found success in the Western Circuit and represented the Great Western Railway Company. In 1929, he joined the Office of the Parliamentary Counsel and was appointed Second Parliamentary Counsel in 1937, serving until 1946 when he became Counsel to the Lord Chairman of the Committees in the House of Lords, serving until retirement in 1953. While at the OPC, he drafted the Finance Bills and became an expert in income tax law; he was also responsible for the National Insurance Act 1946, a highly complex piece of legislation the drafting of which The Times described as Stainton's "hardest job". It was partially due to this that he accepted the House of Lords position, which entailed less work, although it was in that capacity that he drafted the model Bill and standard clauses for Private Bills. Stainton was knighted twice, firstly as a Knight Commander of the Order of the British Empire in 1939 and then again on retirement in 1953 as a Knight Commander of the Order of the Bath. He took silk in 1947.

== Personal life ==
He died on 6 September 1957 and was survived by his wife, Hon. Janet Bertha, daughter of John Dewar, 1st Baron Forteviot.

Legal offices
Preceded by Sir Granville Ram	Second Parliamentary Counsel; 1937–1946	Succeeded by Sir John Rowlatt
