= South Barrow =

Village and civil parish in Somerset, England

Coordinates: 51.0454°N 2.5648°W

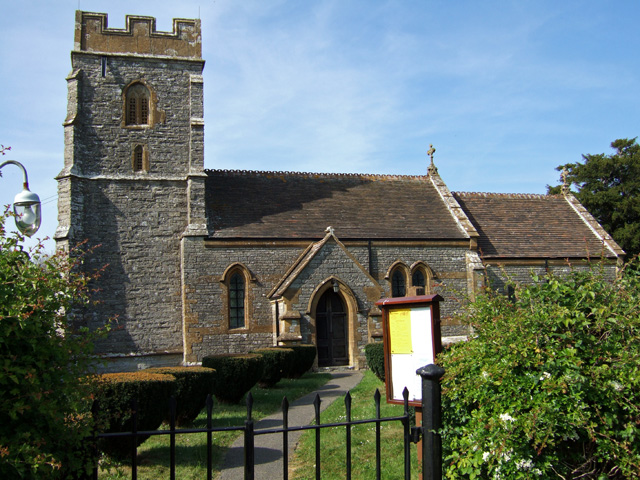
- Church of St Peter, South Barrow

- Location within Somerset
- Population: 162 (2011)
- OS grid reference: ST605275
- Unitary authority: Somerset Council
- Ceremonial county: Somerset
- Region: South West
- Country: England
- Sovereign state: United Kingdom
- Post town: Yeovil
- Postcode district: BA22
- Police: Avon and Somerset
- Fire: Devon and Somerset
- Ambulance: South Western
- UK Parliament: Glastonbury and Somerton

South Barrow is a village and civil parish approximately 2 miles (3 km) north of Sparkford and 7 miles (11 km) north-east of Ilchester in the county of Somerset, England.

== History ==
In the 12th century the manor was held by Alured de Ponsand who gave the church to Wells Cathedral who held it until the late 17th century when it was taken over by the Portmans of Orchard Portman.

The parish was part of the hundred (county subdivision) of Catsash.

== Governance ==
The parish council has responsibility for local issues, including setting an annual precept (local rate) to cover the council's operating costs.

For local government purposes, since 1 April 2023, the parish comes under the unitary authority of Somerset Council. Prior to this, it was part of the non-metropolitan district of South Somerset (established under the Local Government Act 1972). It was part of Wincanton Rural District before 1974.

It is also part of the Glastonbury and Somerton county constituency represented in the House of Commons of the Parliament of the United Kingdom. It elects one Member of Parliament (MP) by the first past the post system of election.

== Religious sites ==
The Church of St Peter dates from the 14th century and has been designated by English Heritage as a Grade II* listed building.
