= Maurice Gwyer =

British lawyer, judge and academic administrator (1878–1952)

Sir Maurice Gwyer GCIE KCB KCSI KC
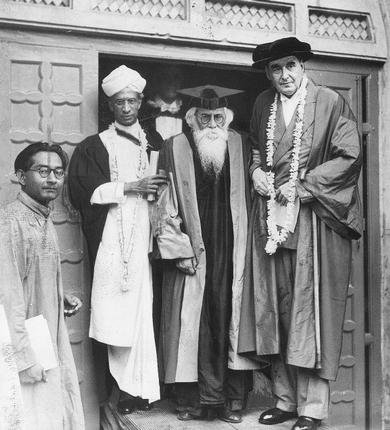
- Gwyer (extreme right) in 1940

Chief Justice of the Federal Court of India
- In office 1 October 1937 – 25 April 1943
- Monarchs: Edward VIII; George VI
- Governor-General: Victor Hope, 2nd Marquess of Linlithgow
- Succeeded by: Srinivas Varadachariar (acting)

Personal details
- Born: Maurice Linford Gwyer; 25 April 1878 London, Middlesex, England
- Died: 12 October 1952 (aged 74) Eastbourne, Sussex, England
- Education: Christ Church, Oxford (BA)

Sir Maurice Linford Gwyer, GCIE, KCB, KCSI, KC (25 April 1878 – 12 October 1952) was a British lawyer, judge, and academic administrator. He served as Vice-Chancellor of Delhi University from 1938 to 1950, and Chief Justice of India from 1937 to 1943. He is credited with having founded the college Miranda House in 1948 in Delhi, India. Gwyer Hall, the oldest men residence for the university students is named after him.

== Biography ==
Gwyer was born to John Edward Gwyer and Edith Gwyer (née Linford), and he had a sister, Barbara Gwyer. He was educated at Highgate School from 1887 to 1892, then at Westminster School, before he graduated with a BA from Christ Church, Oxford. In November 1902 he was elected a Fellow of All Souls College, Oxford. He was appointed Treasury Solicitor in 1926.

He was appointed CB (1921 New Year Honours), KCB (1928 Birthday Honours), KCSI (1935 Birthday Honours), and GCIE (1948 New Year Honours). He became an honorary student of Christ Church (1937), an honorary DCL of Oxford (1939), LLD of Travancore (1943) and Patna (1944), and DLitt of Delhi (1950).

He died at his home, 14 Kepplestone, Eastbourne, Sussex, on 12 October 1952, and was buried at St Marylebone cemetery, East Finchley, on 17 October.

Legal offices
| Preceded by Office created | Solicitor and Legal Adviser, Ministry of Health; 1919–1926 | Succeeded by Sir John Maude |
| Preceded by Clive Lawrence | HM Procurator General and Treasury Solicitor; 1926–1933 | Succeeded by Sir Thomas Barnes |
| Preceded by Sir William Graham-Harrison | First Parliamentary Counsel; 1933–1937 | Succeeded by Sir Granville Ram |
