= Anthony Stainton =

British lawyer and parliamentary draftsman

Sir Anthony Nathaniel Stainton, KCB, QC (8 January 1913 – 7 November 1988) was a British lawyer and parliamentary draftsman.

== Career ==
Born 8 January 1913 to Evelyn Stainton, Anthony Stainton was schooled at Eton before going up to Christ Church, Oxford. Called to the bar in 1937 he practised at Chancery. During World War II he served in the Mediterranean with the Royal Northumberland Fusiliers achieving the rank of Captain. In 1943, he was called back from war service by the First Parliamentary Counsel who requested extra draftsmen for his office to deal with wartime legislation. He was made a Parliamentary Counsel in 1956, and then in 1972 became First Parliamentary Counsel, serving for four years until retirement in 1976. During his time as a draftsman, he worked on many of the important fiscal acts of the post-war decades, skilfully dealing with the complexities of capital gains tax legislation; The Times described him as a "meticulous draftsman". He was appointed a Companion of the Order of the Bath in the 1967 Birthday Honours and promoted to Knight Commander in 1974; the following year he took silk and in 1984 became an honorary bencher of Lincoln's Inn.

Stainton enjoyed watching horse races and playing golf. He married twice, firstly to Barbara Russell, and then secondly to Rachel Frances (died 2009), daughter of Colonel Charles Edward Coghill, CMG; by his first wife he had three daughters. He died on 7 November 1988.

Legal offices
Preceded by Sir John Fiennes	First Parliamentary Counsel; 1972–1976	Succeeded by Sir Henry Rowe
