= Alan Ellis (lawyer) =

Sir Alan Edward Ellis, KCB, QC (21 December 1890 – 28 August 1960) was a British lawyer and parliamentary draftsman.

== Career ==
Educated at Cheltenham College and Brasenose College, Oxford, Ellis served in the First World War and was called to the bar in 1920. He practised as a barrister until he joined the Office of the Parliamentary Counsel in 1930 and was appointed First Parliamentary Counsel in 1947, serving until 1953; he was responsible for drafting many important pieces of legislation, such as the Coal Act 1938, the Purchase Tax Act 1940 and the Parliament Act 1949. In 1953, he became chairman of the Statute Law Committee (until 1955) and a Church Commissioner. In 1955, he became Counsel to the Speaker. Appointed a Companion of the Order of the Bath in 1941, Ellis was promoted to Knight Commander in 1948; he took silk in 1951 and was a bencher of the Inner Temple.

== Likenesses ==
- Three portraits by Walter Stoneman (1949) in the National Portrait Gallery, London.

Legal offices
Preceded by Sir Granville Ram	First Parliamentary Counsel; 1947–1953	Succeeded by Sir John Rowlatt
