= Noël Hutton =

British parliamentary draftsman (1907–1984)

Hutton in 1961

Sir Noël Kilpatrick Hutton, GCB, QC (27 December 1907 – 14 June 1984) was a British parliamentary draftsman.

== Early life ==
Hutton was born on 27 December 1907 to William Hutton. He attended Fettes College before going up to University College, Oxford, where he studied classics, winning the Gaisford Greek Verse Prize and the Craven Scholarship.

== Career ==
Called to the bar in 1932, Hutton worked in the Chancery Chambers before joining the Office of the Parliamentary Counsel in 1938. He was appointed Second Parliamentary Counsel in 1953, and promoted to First Parliamentary Counsel three years later, serving until retirement in 1968. The Times recorded that as a parliamentary draftsman "he had all the qualities for success in this esoteric but hugely important field"; he also ran his office with patience and had a wry sense of humour. He had been appointed a Companion of the Order of the Bath in 1950, and was promoted in 1957 to Knight Commander and then in 1966 to Knight Grand Cross, the order's highest grade. He took silk in 1962 and was made a bencher of Lincoln's Inn in 1967.

Hutton had rowed for Oxford in his university days; throughout his life he enjoyed cars, cricket, golf and skiing. He died on 14 June 1984, leaving a widow (Virginia, daughter of Sir George Young, 4th Baronet) and four children.

== Likenesses ==
- One photographic portrait of Hutton (by Walter Bird, 1961) is kept in the National Portrait Gallery, London (reference no. NPGx168514).

Legal offices
| Preceded by Sir John Rowlatt | First Parliamentary Counsel; 1956–1968 | Succeeded by Sir John Fiennes |
| Preceded by Sir John Rowlatt | Second Parliamentary Counsel; 1953–1956 | Succeeded by Sir John Fiennes |
