= Richard Heaton =

British barrister and civil servant

Sir Richard Heaton KCB
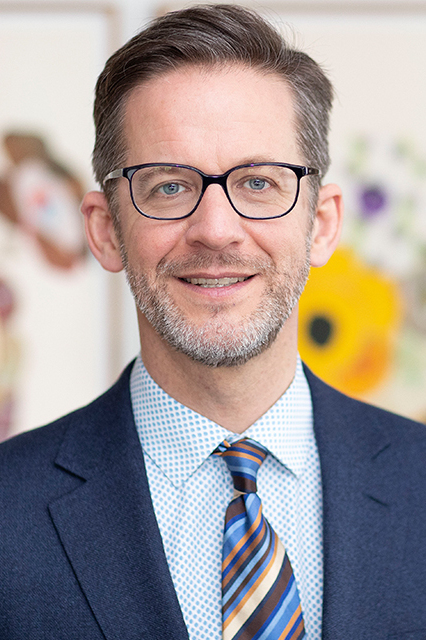
- Richard Heaton

Clerk of the Crown in Chancery Permanent Secretary at the Ministry of Justice
- In office August 2015 – August 2020
- Prime Minister: David Cameron; Theresa May; Boris Johnson
- Minister: Michael Gove; Liz Truss; David Lidington; David Gauke; Robert Buckland
- Preceded by: Ursula Brennan
- Succeeded by: Antonia Romeo

Cabinet Office Permanent Secretary
- In office August 2012 – August 2015
- Prime Minister: David Cameron
- Preceded by: Ian Watmore
- Succeeded by: John Manzoni

First Parliamentary Counsel
- In office February 2012 – 2015
- Prime Minister: David Cameron
- Preceded by: Stephen Laws
- Succeeded by: Elizabeth Gardiner

Personal details
- Born: 5 October 1965 (age 60)
- Education: Worcester College, Oxford; Inns of Court School of Law

Sir Richard Nicholas Heaton, KCB (born 5 October 1965) is a barrister and former senior British civil servant who was the Permanent Secretary to the Ministry of Justice and Clerk of the Crown in Chancery from September 2015 until resigning in August 2020. He had previously served as Cabinet Office Permanent Secretary, and First Parliamentary Counsel. He currently serves as Warden of Robinson College, Cambridge.

== Early life and education ==
Heaton was born on 5 October 1965. He read law at Worcester College, Oxford, graduating with a Bachelor of Arts (BA) degree in 1987.

== Career ==
Heaton worked as a barrister, after being called to the bar at Inner Temple in 1988. He joined the Government Legal Service in 1991 where he remained until moving to the Department for Constitutional Affairs in 2004 where he served as Director of Legal Services. He then went on to work as Head of law and governance at the Department for Work and Pensions from 2007 to 2009, and Director General for pensions and ageing society from 2009 to 2012.

In February 2012, Heaton became First Parliamentary Counsel, replacing the retiring Sir Stephen Laws. In August 2012, he was additionally appointed Cabinet Office Permanent Secretary, taking over from Ian Watmore, splitting his time between the two roles. In his role as First Parliamentary Counsel he launched the Good Law initiative, seeking to reduce complexity in legislation. In April 2014, he became Civil Service Race Champion.

On 2 July 2015, it was announced that Heaton would leave the Cabinet Office to take up the position of Permanent Secretary to the Ministry of Justice (formally, the Clerk of the Crown in Chancery), replacing Dame Ursula Brennan on her retirement. His Cabinet Office roles were split: as Permanent Secretary, he was replaced by John Manzoni; as First Parliamentary Counsel, Elizabeth Gardiner replaced him. As the Ministry of Justice’s permanent secretary, he featured notably in part 5 of Rory Stewart’s political memoirs.

As of 2015, Heaton was paid a salary of between £180,000 and £184,999 by the department, making him one of the 328 most highly paid people in the British public sector at that time.

In July 2020, it was announced that Heaton would leave the Civil Service as Permanent Secretary to the Ministry of Justice in August 2020. He was succeeded by Antonia Romeo on 18 January 2021.

=== Academic career ===
On 13 May 2021, it was announced that Heaton was to succeed David Yates as Warden of Robinson College, Cambridge. He assumed the post on 1 October 2021, and serves as the college's third warden.

== Personal life ==
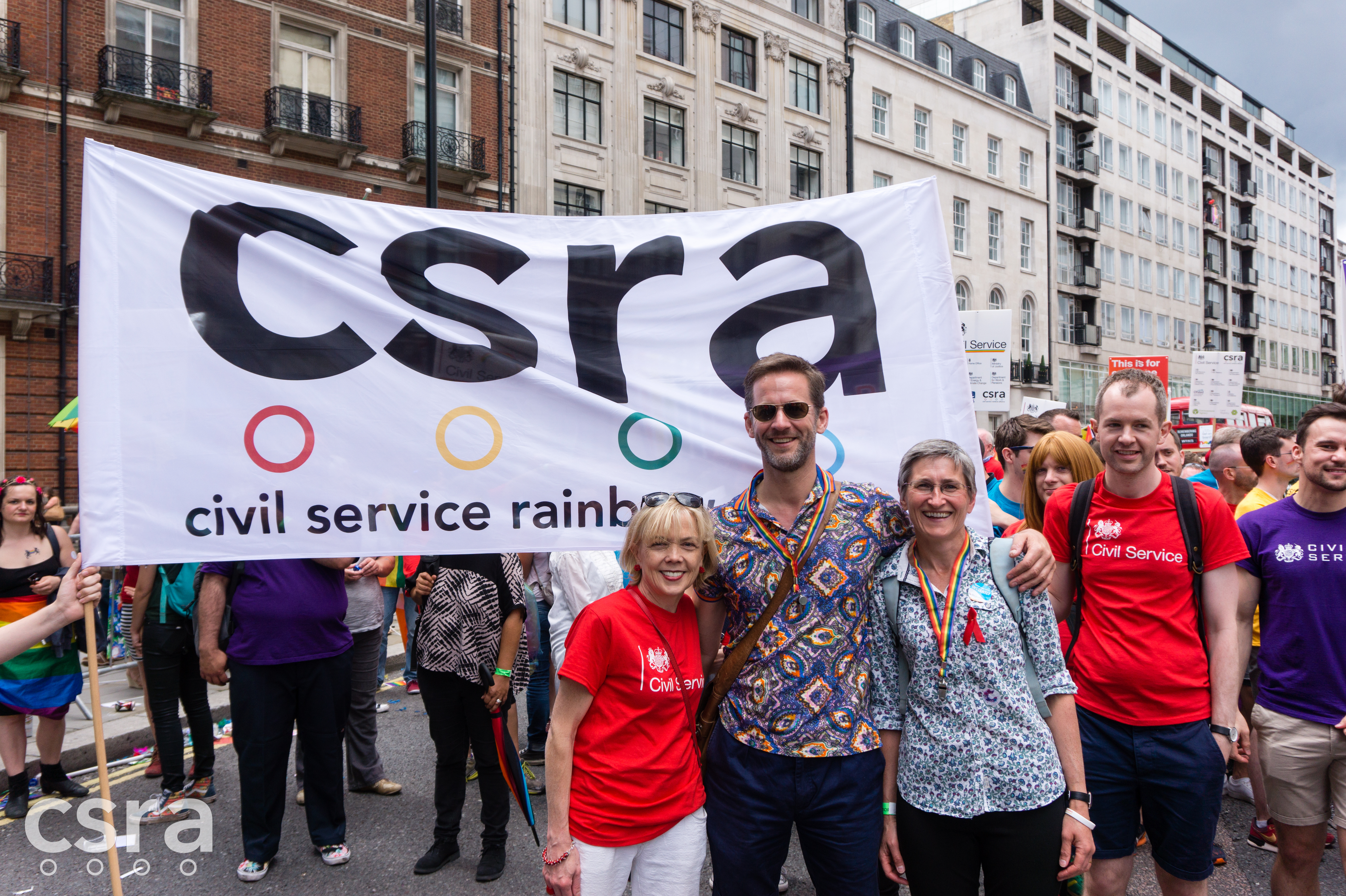
Heaton with the Civil Service LGBT+ Network at Pride 2016

In 2011, he was placed at 91 on the Independent on Sunday Pink List, a list of influential British LGBT people.

== Honours ==
Heaton was appointed a Companion of the Order of the Bath (CB) in the Queen's Birthday Honours of 2011. In the 2019 New Year Honours he was promoted to Knight Commander of the Order of the Bath (KCB) for public service.

Government offices
Preceded by Ian Watmore	Cabinet Office Permanent Secretary; 2012–2015	Succeeded by John Manzoni
Preceded by Sir Stephen Laws	First Parliamentary Counsel; 2012–2015	Succeeded by Elizabeth Gardiner
Preceded by Ursula Brennan	Permanent Secretary at the Ministry of Justice; 2015–2020	Succeeded by Antonia Romeo
