= Lovington, Somerset =

Village and civil parish in Somerset, England

Coordinates: 51.0723°N 2.5794°W

Lovington
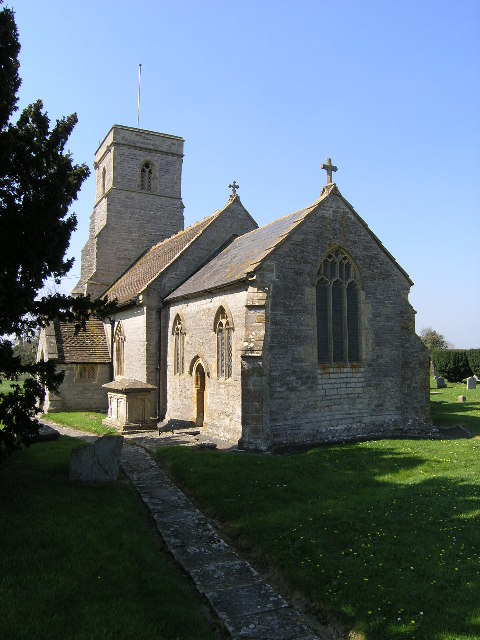
- Church of St Thomas of Canterbury, Lovington

- Location within Somerset
- Population: 141 (2011)
- OS grid reference: ST595305
- Unitary authority: Somerset Council
- Ceremonial county: Somerset
- Region: South West
- Country: England
- Sovereign state: United Kingdom
- Post town: Castle Cary
- Postcode district: BA7
- Dialling code: 01963
- Police: Avon and Somerset
- Fire: Devon and Somerset
- Ambulance: South Western
- UK Parliament: Glastonbury and Somerton

Lovington is a village and civil parish in Somerset, England, situated 3 miles (4.8 km) south west of Castle Cary, between the River Brue and River Cary. The parish, which includes the hamlet of Wheathill, has a population of 141.

== History ==
The name of the village comes from Old English meaning Lufa's settlement.

There was a mill on the River Brue in the village at the time of the Domesday Book, when it was held by Serlo de Burci, however it is not certain whether this is the same site as the current Lovington Mill which was built around 1800.

The parish of Lovington was part of the hundred of Catsash, while Wheathill was part of the Whitley Hundred.

The village school was built in the early 19th century, and was helped later in the century, with donations and equipment, by the local priest and hymn writer Godfrey Thring.

== Governance ==
The parish council has responsibility for local issues, including setting an annual precept (local rate) to cover the council's operating costs and producing annual accounts for public scrutiny. The parish council evaluates local planning applications and works with the local police, district council officers, and neighbourhood watch groups on matters of crime, security, and traffic. The parish council's role also includes initiating projects for the maintenance and repair of parish facilities, as well as consulting with the district council on the maintenance, repair, and improvement of highways, drainage, footpaths, public transport, and street cleaning. Conservation matters (including trees and listed buildings) and environmental issues are also the responsibility of the council.

For local government purposes, since 1 April 2023, the parish comes under the unitary authority of Somerset Council. Prior to this, it was part of the non-metropolitan district of South Somerset (established under the Local Government Act 1972). It was part of Wincanton Rural District before 1974.

It is also part of the Glastonbury and Somerton county constituency represented in the House of Commons of the Parliament of the United Kingdom. It elects one Member of Parliament (MP) by the first past the post system of election.

== Religious sites ==
The Anglican parish Church of St Thomas of Canterbury has 13th-century origins and was restored and enlarged in 1861. It has been designated as a Grade II* listed building. The Church of St John Baptist was converted into a private house in the 1970s.

In the 1780s Thomas Charles held the curacy of Lovington along with several other local parishes.
