= Edward Alderson (parliamentary clerk) =

British public servant and Clerk of the Parliaments from 1930 to 1934

Sir Edward Alderson KCB KBE
- Alderson in 1925

Clerk of the Parliaments
- In office 1930–1934
- Preceded by: Sir Arthur Thring
- Succeeded by: Sir Henry Badeley

Personal details
- Born: 2 June 1864 New Zealand
- Died: 7 March 1951 (aged 86)
- Relations: Edward Hall Alderson (grandfather)
- Education: Brasenose College, Oxford
- Occupation: Civil servant

Sir Edward Hall Alderson, KCB, KBE (2 June 1864 – 7 March 1951) was a British public servant and Clerk of the Parliaments from 1930 to 1934.

== Early life ==
Alderson was born on 2 June 1864 in New Zealand. He was a son of Francis John Alderson and Jane Irvin Black, a daughter of Dr. Thomas Black and Charlotte (née Leatham) Black.

He came a legal family; his grandfather, Sir Edward Hall Alderson, was a Baron of the Exchequer (whose daughter married Robert Gascoyne-Cecil, 3rd Marquess of Salisbury), and his great-grandfather, Robert Alderson, was Recorder of Norwich, Yarmouth and Ipswich.

He attended Brasenose College, Oxford, before he was called to the bar in 1890.

== Career ==
He practised on the South-Eastern Circuit only briefly, being appointed private secretary to Lord Halsbury in 1895. Five years later, he was appointed Reading Clerk and Clerk of Outdoor Committees of the House of Lords. Promotions followed: in 1917 to Clerk-Assistant, and in 1930 to Clerk of the Parliaments. He retired in 1934.

Appointed a Companion of the Order of the Bath (CB) in the 1919 New Year Honours, Alderson went on to receive two knighthoods, as a Knight Commander of the Order of the British Empire (KBE) in the 1925 Birthday Honours, and then as a Knight Commander of the Order of the Bath (KCB) in the 1931 New Year Honours.

== Personal life ==
Alderson married Mary Emily Bonsor, daughter of Sir Cosmo Bonsor, 1st Baronet and the former Emily Gertrude Fellowes. Before her death in 1935, they were the parents of three children, including:

- Richard Cosmo Alderson (1906–1944), who was killed in action in Italy during World War II; he married Gillian Mary Barrington, a daughter of merchant banker Hon. Bernard Barrington and sister to Patrick Barrington, 11th Viscount Barrington.

He died on 7 March 1951; two children from their marriage survived him.

Government offices
Preceded by Sir Arthur Thring	Clerk of the Parliaments; 1930–1934	Succeeded by Sir Henry Badeley
