= Henry Jenkyns =

English lawyer and parliamentary counsel

Sir Henry Jenkyns KCB (2 September 1838 – 10 December 1899) was an English lawyer and parliamentary counsel.

Jenkyns was the son of Rev. Canon Henry Jenkyns, D.D., of Durham. Educated at Eton and Balliol College, Oxford; B.A., 1860 (First Class Lit. Hum.); called to the Bar at Lincoln's Inn, 1863; Assistant Parliamentary Counsel to the Treasury, 1869–86, when he succeeded Lord Thring as Parliamentary Counsel.

He married, in 1877, Madeline Sabine, daughter of Admiral Sir Thomas Sabine Pasley. On 10 December 1899, he died at Bracknell, aged 59.
