= Robinson College, Cambridge =

College of the University of Cambridge

Coordinates: 52°12′17″N 0°06′17″E

Robinson College
- University of Cambridge
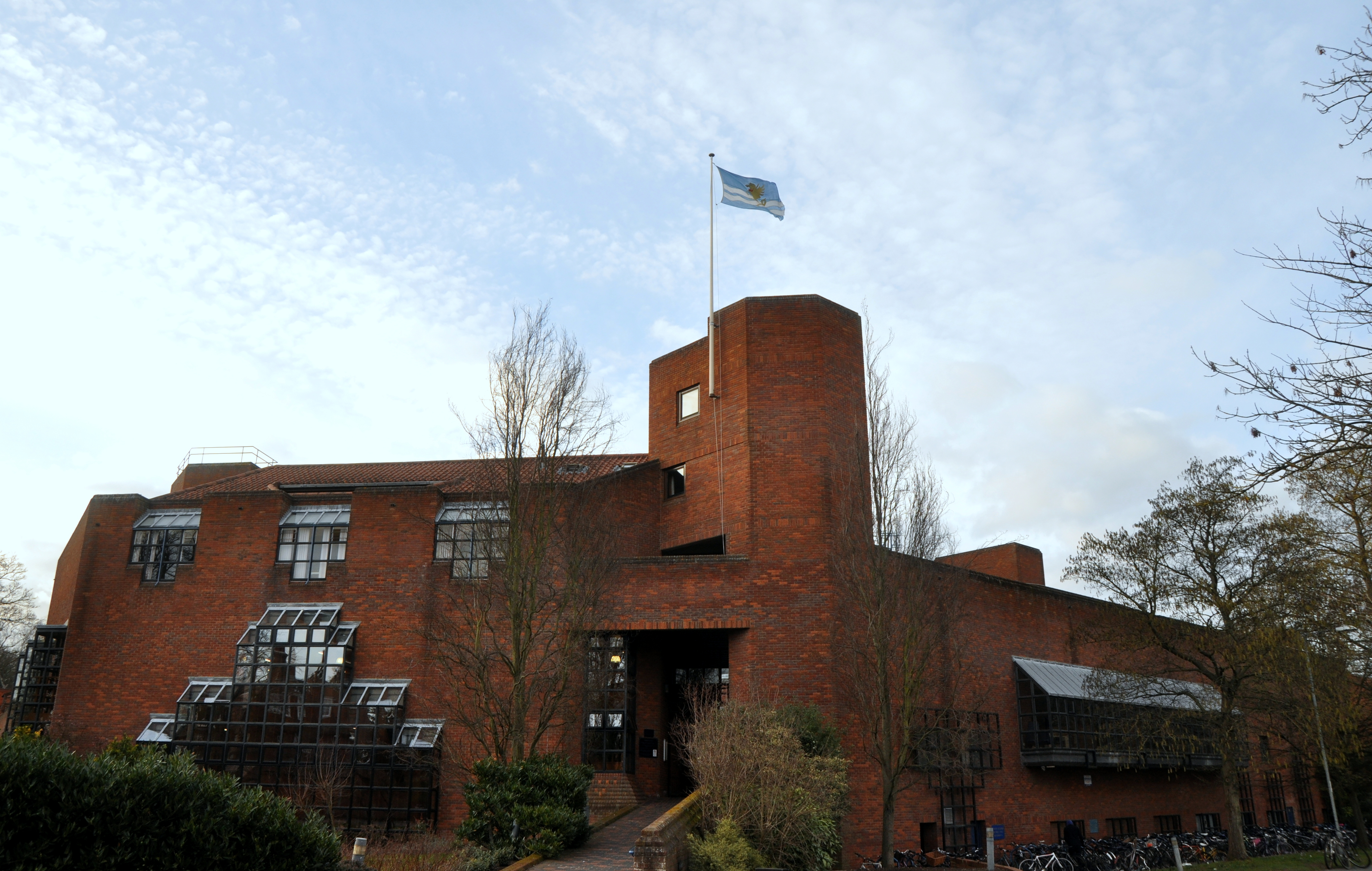
- Facade of Robinson College

- Arms: Azure in base two Bars wavy Argent over all a Pegasus rampant Or gorged with a Crown rayonny Gules
Scarf colours: from one edge of the scarf to the other, the first third grey, then three equal stripes of blue, gold and grey, and then the final third blue
- Location: Grange Road (map)
- Full name: Robinson College in the University of Cambridge
- Abbreviation: R
- Established: 1977
- Named after: David Robinson
- Sister college: St Catherine's College, Oxford
- Warden: Sir Richard Heaton
- Undergraduates: 428 (2022–23)
- Postgraduates: 256 (2022–23)
- Fellows: 110
- Endowment: £25.7m (2021)
- Website: robinson.cam.ac.uk
- Students' association: rcsa.co.uk
- MCR: mcr.robinson.cam.ac.uk
- Boat club: Robinson College Boat Club

Map
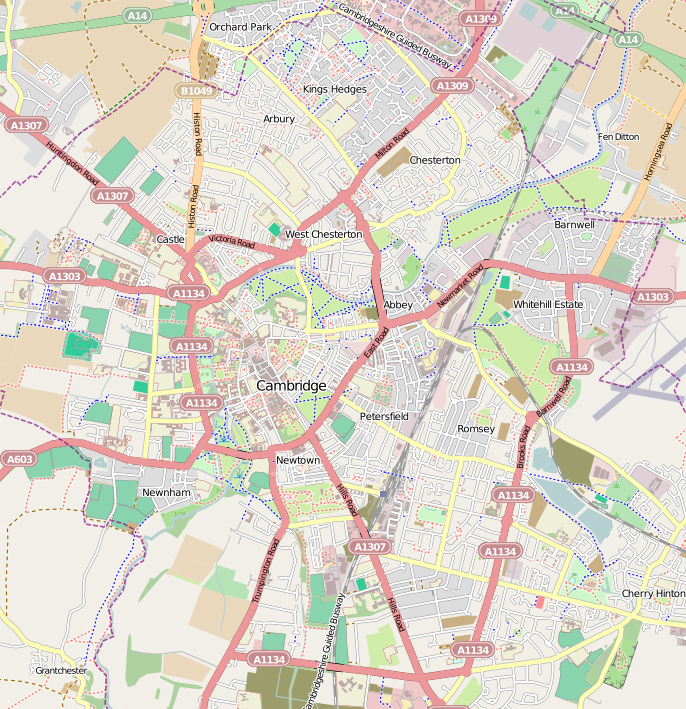
- Location within Cambridge

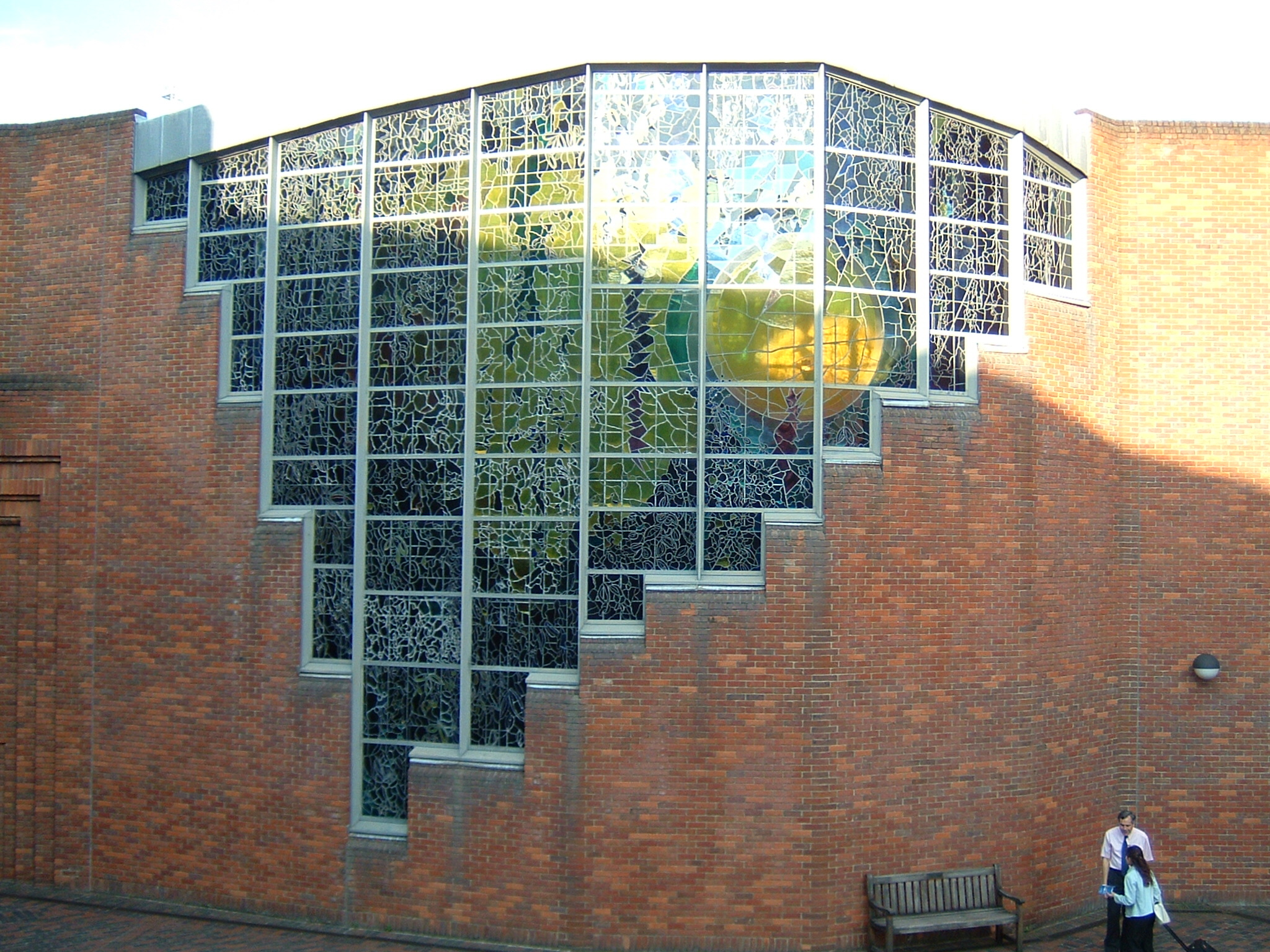
The stained-glass windows of Robinson College Chapel, designed by John Piper.

Robinson College is a constituent college of the University of Cambridge. Founded in 1977, it is one of the newest Oxbridge colleges and is unique in having been intended, from its inception, for both undergraduate and graduate students of both sexes.

The College was founded through a significant donation from the businessman and philanthropist, Sir David Robinson. In 1981 Robinson College was formally opened by Queen Elizabeth II with both undergraduate and graduate students in attendance.

== History ==
The College was founded after David Robinson offered the University £17 million to establish a new college in Cambridge. Robinson later gave his College another £1 million on the occasion of its official opening. The first graduate students and fellows joined the College in 1977. Undergraduates (20 of them) were first admitted in 1979, but significant numbers only began arriving the following year. Robinson was formally opened by Queen Elizabeth II in May 1981.

While Robinson embraces many Cambridge traditions, such as Formal Hall, a chapel and porters' lodge, it avoids others: for example, it allows its students to walk on the grass in the College gardens. In general, the College has a reputation for being slightly less formal and traditional than other Cambridge Colleges.

== Buildings and grounds ==
Designed by Andy MacMillan and Isi Metzstein of the Scottish architectural practice Gillespie, Kidd & Coia, Robinson's main buildings are distinctive for the use of handmade red bricks in their construction. In November 2022, Historic England announced that the College had been awarded Grade II* listed status. In November 2008, the college was included in the "50 most inspiring buildings in Britain" by The Daily Telegraph. The oak-panelled dining hall seats 300 for formal dining and the library is remarkable for its use of woodwork, for which it was awarded the Carpenter's Award for 1981.

The College is located a ten-minute walk west of the city centre, behind the University Library, near the science buildings in West Cambridge and the arts faculties on the university's Sidgwick Site. It stands on a 12.5-acre (5.1 ha) wooded site of historical and horticultural interest. The College Gardens are a fusion of ten pre-existing gardens which date back to late Victorian and early Edwardian times and are crossed by the Bin Brook stream, which once supplied water to the Medieval Hospital of St John (now St John's College).

Within its grounds are Thorneycreek House and Cottage (built in 1895), the Crausaz Wordsworth Building and the Maria Björnson outdoor theatre. Robinson owns a number of houses on Adams Road and Sylvester Road adjoining the main college site, which it uses for student accommodation.

The main entrance to the college is via a drawbridge-like ramp which is accessible to wheelchair users, and there are also some special facilities for those with physical or visual disabilities.

The Needham Research Institute is also located within the College grounds.

=== Chapel ===
The chapel of Robinson College was built as an integral part of the main campus complex. It projects into the central court with a long form that swells outwards at the east end. The dominant feature of the chapel is a large asymmetrical stained glass wall positioned behind the altar. Designed by John Piper and made by Patrick Reyntiens, the window, entitled Light of the World, was commissioned in 1978 and installed in 1980. The semi-abstract design, comprising 66 individual glass panels arranged as an inverted asymmetrical pyramid, shows the sun to the upper left which expands out to fields of green and blue, with leaf and floral details. It is framed by a stepped wall that, from the inside, partly conceals the window from view at an angle. A smaller window in the ante-chapel is also by Piper and Reyntiens.

Piper, in collaboration with Metzstein, also designed much of the liturgical furniture, including the altar table, lectern and font. A ceramic wall plaque showing the Deposition of Christ was designed by Piper and realised by Geoffrey Eastop. In a gallery positioned above the ante-chapel is a Frobenius organ. Separating the ante-chapel from the main space is a bronze screen with naturalistic leaf design rising towards the organ loft, together with external bronze fittings, all by Jacqueline Stieger.

=== Conferences ===
As one of Cambridge's most important conference centres, Robinson hosts conferences when undergraduate students are absent.

== Student life ==
Students of the college are represented by the Robinson College Students' Association, or RCSA, headed by a President, with members of the college elected to the RCSA committee every year. Politically, Robinson is generally seen as liberal. Robinson has supplied a large number of Green Officers to the Cambridge University Students' Union in recent years and in 2008 was judged the most environmentally friendly college in Cambridge.

Like other colleges, Robinson provides its students with recreational facilities such as a JCR, MCR, TV room, art room, and the Red Brick Café and Bar. As a result of its other role as a conference centre, the college is equipped with two auditoria that are available for student use during term; the smaller one being frequently used by the college's film society and the larger by the "Brickhouse Theatre Company" (dramatic society). There is also a purpose-built party room that hosts college "bops" and other entertainment. Musical talents are catered for by a music room, CD library and chapel.

There are also several sports teams, covering most major sports: everything from water polo and cricket to rowing, padel and rugby union. Robinson has become successful in hockey, winning the Cambridge colleges league and colleges Varsity match against Oriel College, Oxford, in 2009–2010, in addition to becoming mixed cuppers champions by beating Churchill College, Cambridge. Slobinson RUFC (a portmanteau of Robinson College and Selwyn College), the college's Rugby Union team is combined with the adjacent Selwyn College, Cambridge. They are captained by Angus Carson.

=== College arms ===
The arms of the College are described as follows: Azure in base two Bars wavy Argent over all a Pegasus rampant Or gorged with a Crown rayonny Gules.

=== College grace ===
The Latin grace is read before the start of formal hall.

Latin: Benedic, domine, nobis et donis tuis, per Jesum Christum dominum nostrum. Amen.
Lord, bless us and your gifts, through Jesus Christ our Lord. Amen.

== Gallery ==
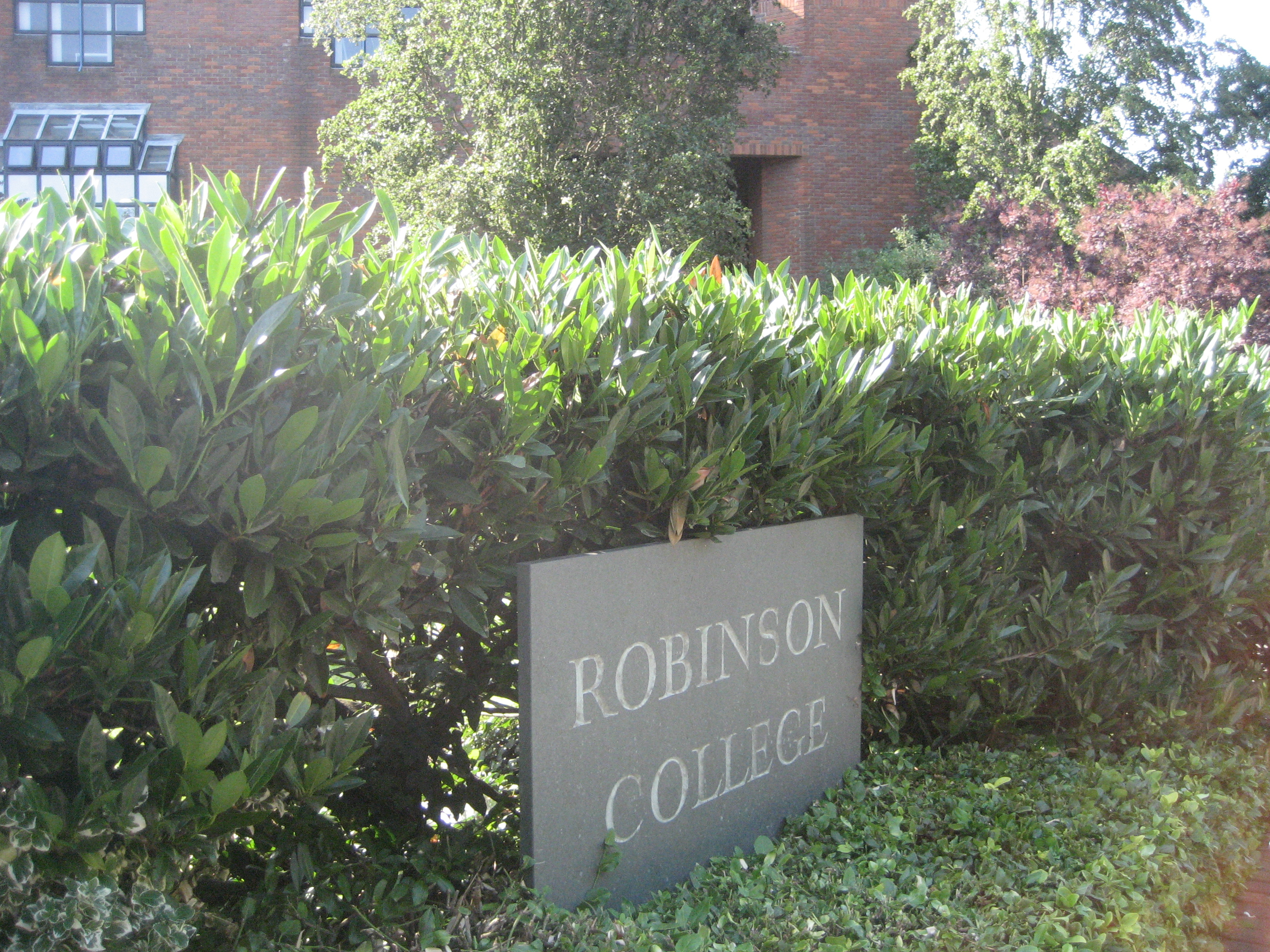
Robinson College Entrance

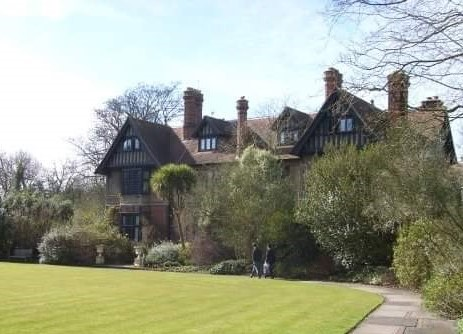
Thorneycreek House

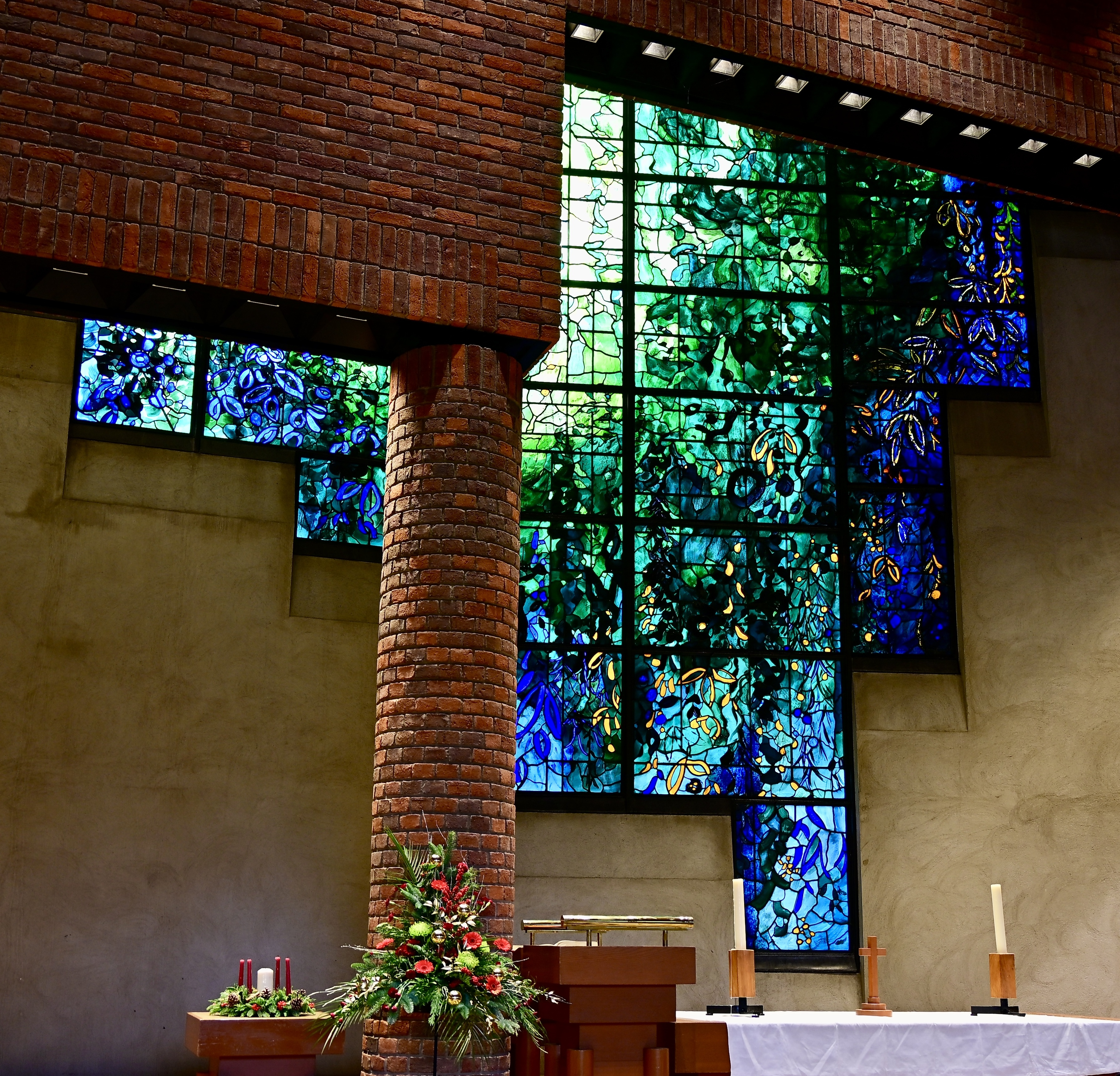
Stained-glass windows by John Piper

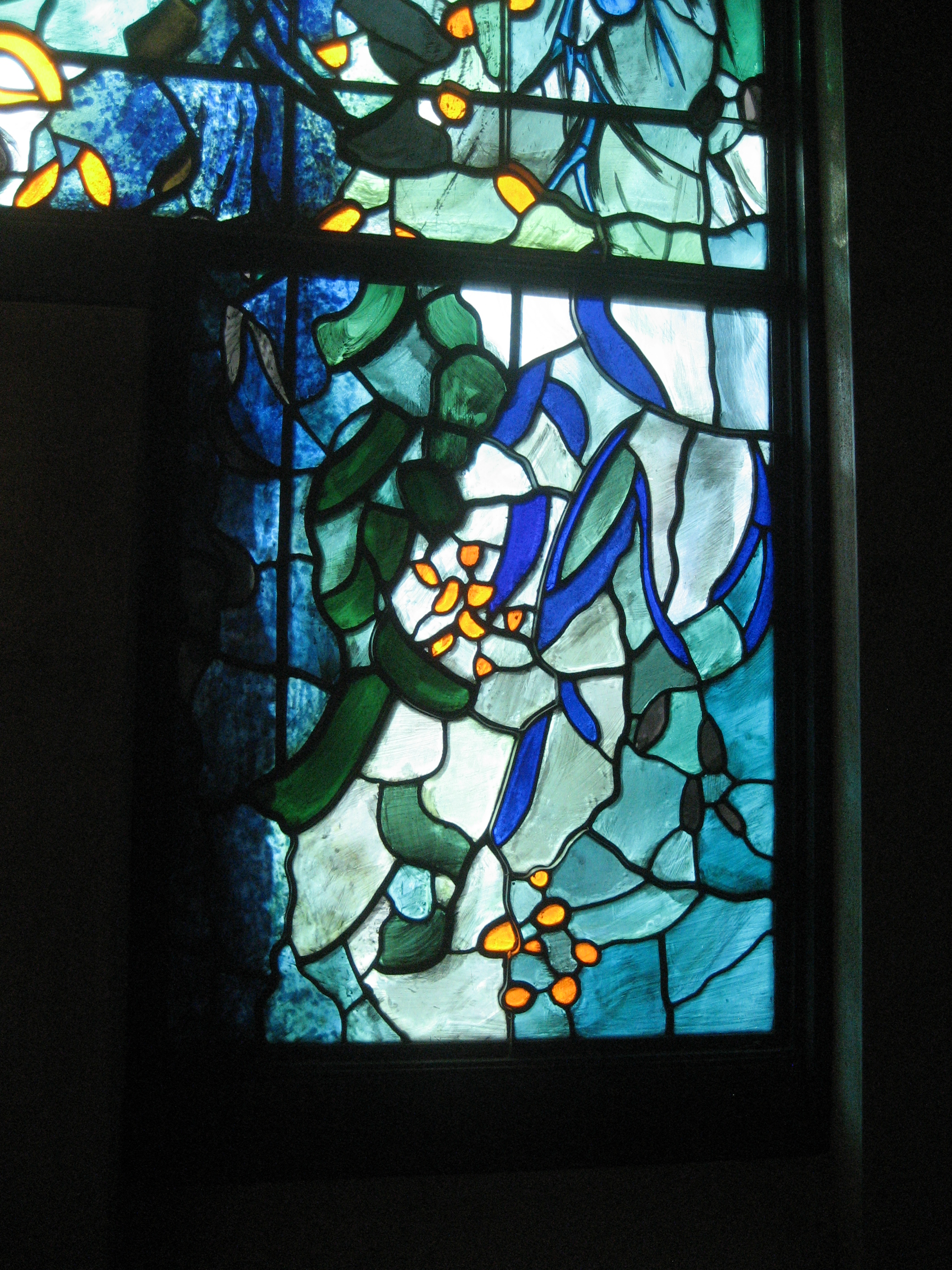
A section of the stained-glass window by John Piper

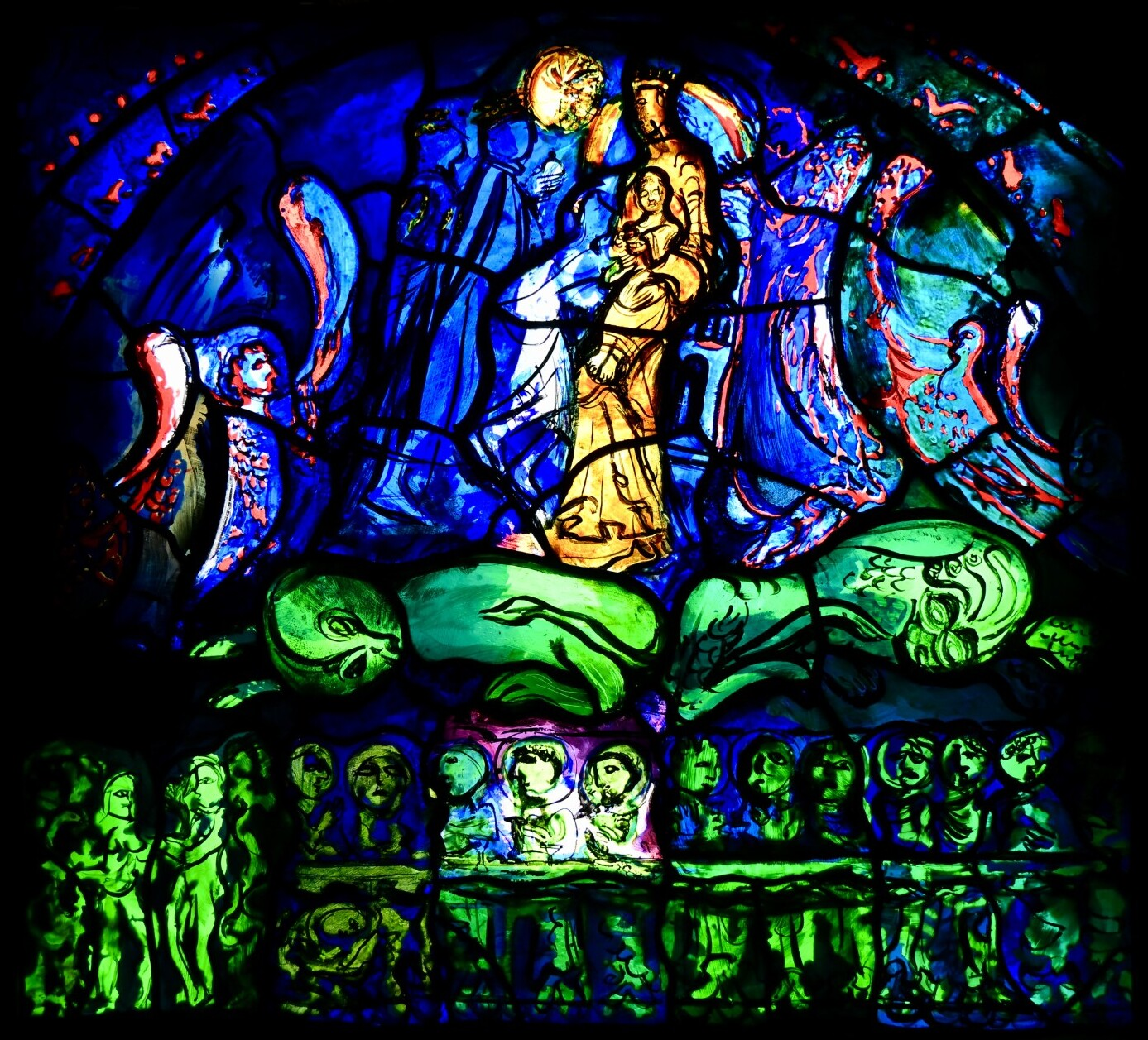
Ante-chapel window by John Piper

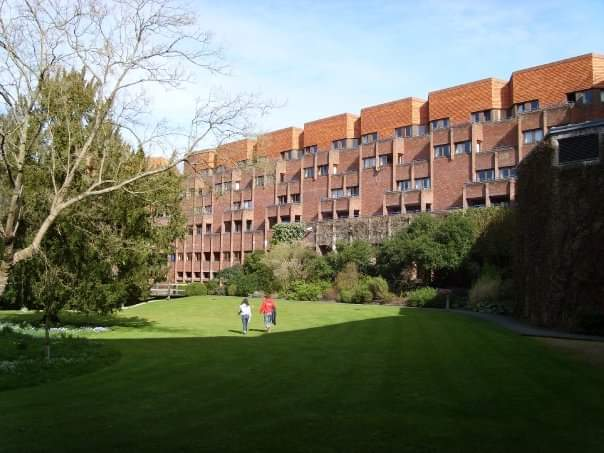
Robinson College gardens

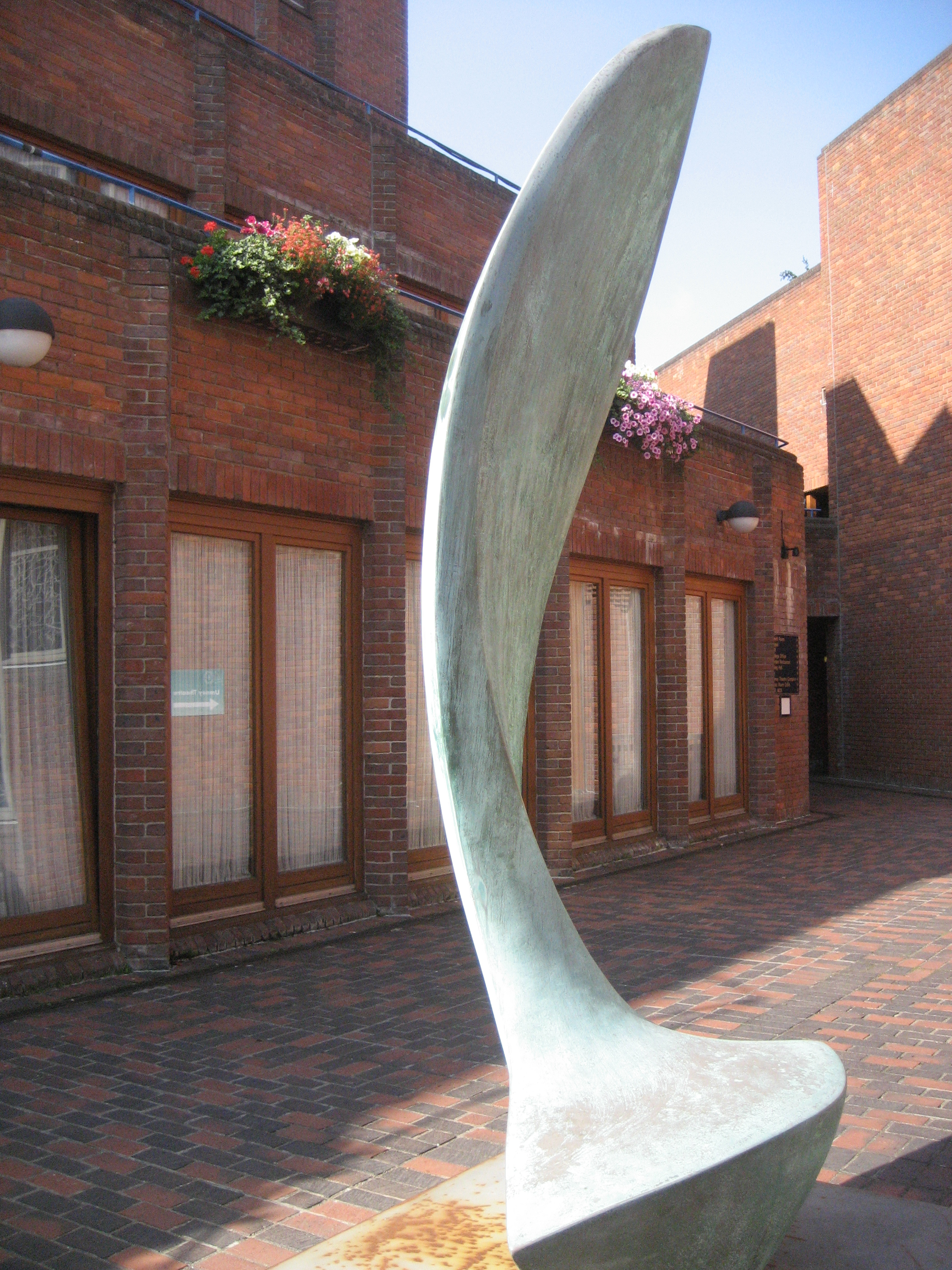
'Finback' sculpture by Ben Barrell

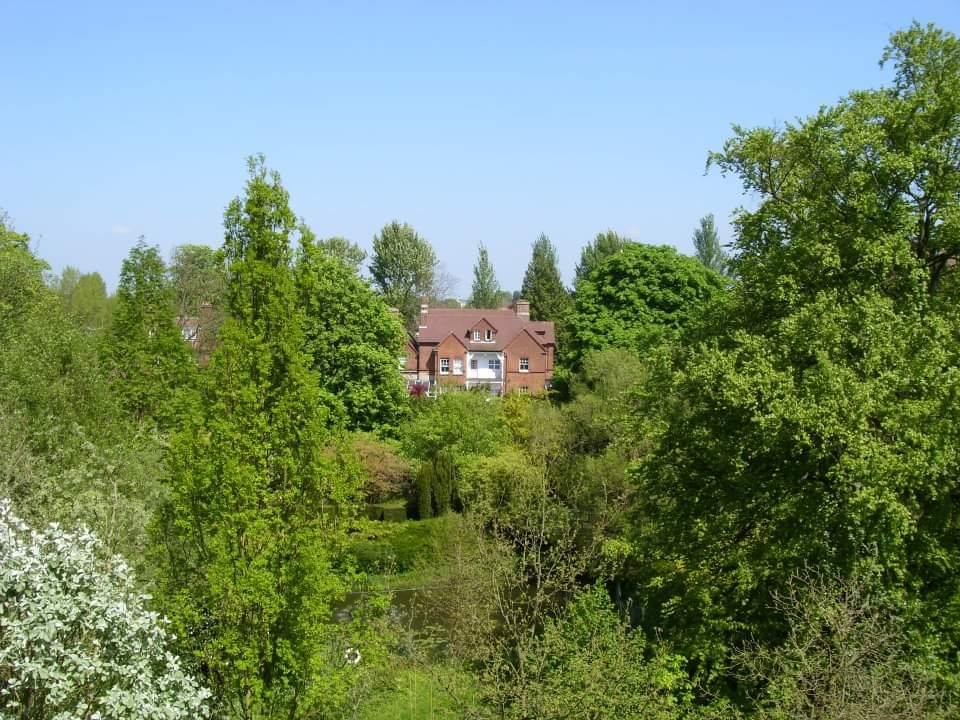
2 Adams Road (Robinson College student accommodation) viewed from across the college gardens.

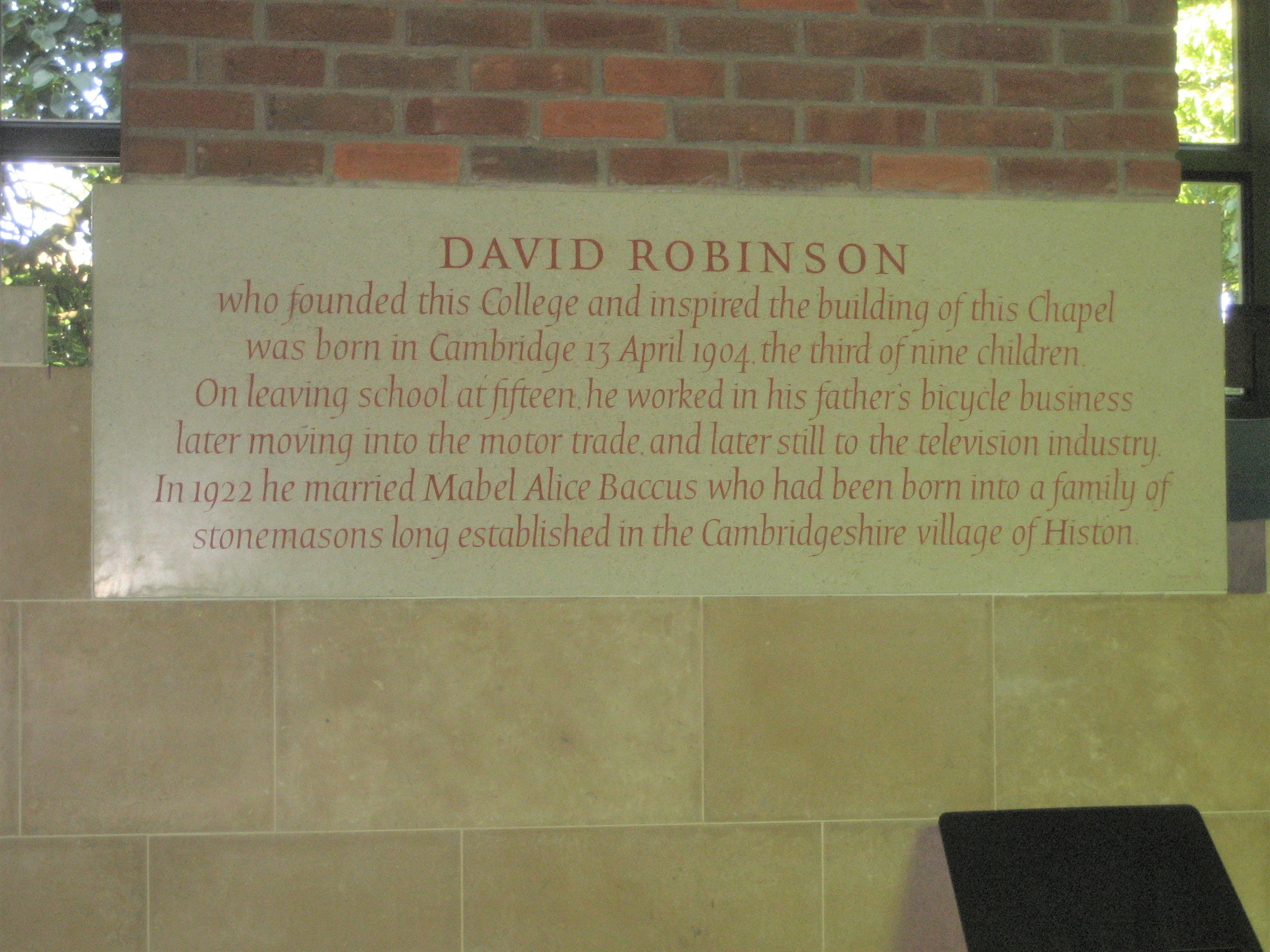
Memorial stone for David Robinson

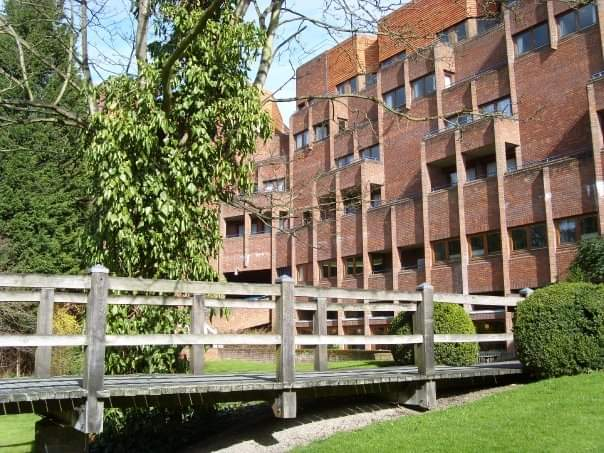
A section of the elevated walkway over Bin Brook stream

== Notable people ==
=== Alumni ===
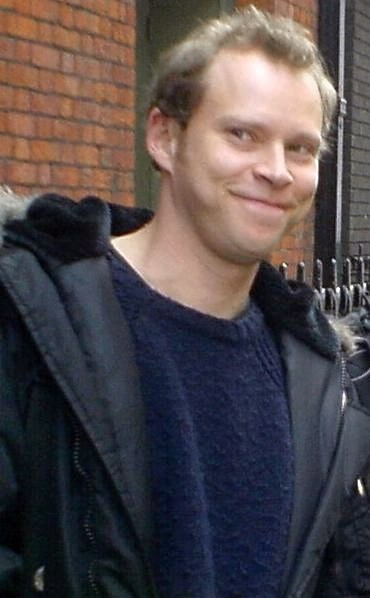
Robert Webb

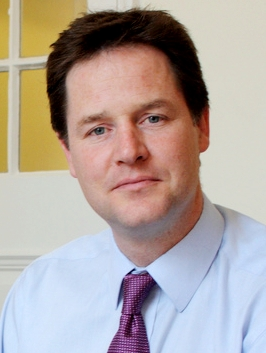
Nick Clegg

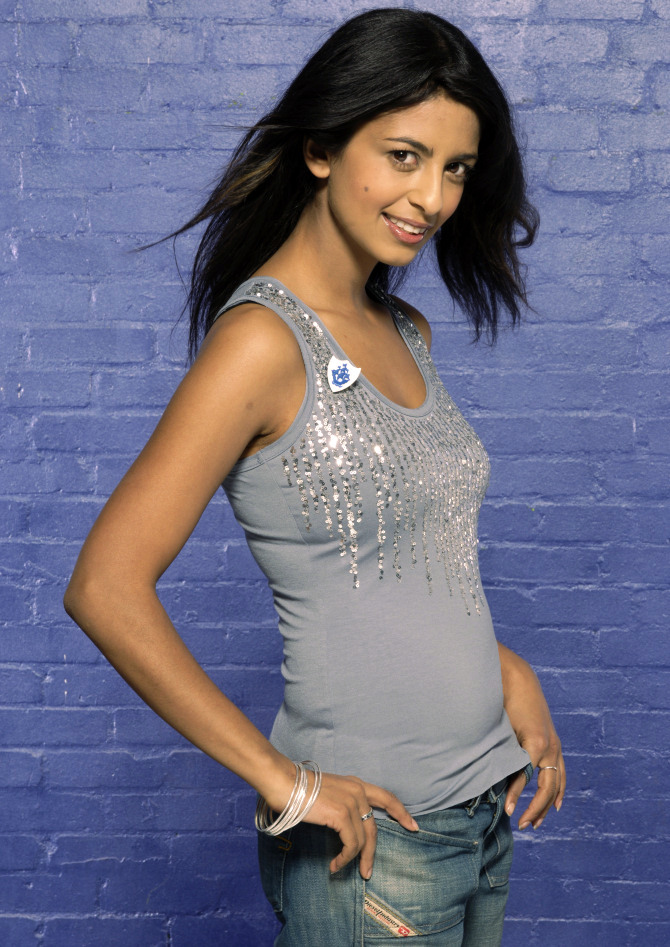
Konnie Huq

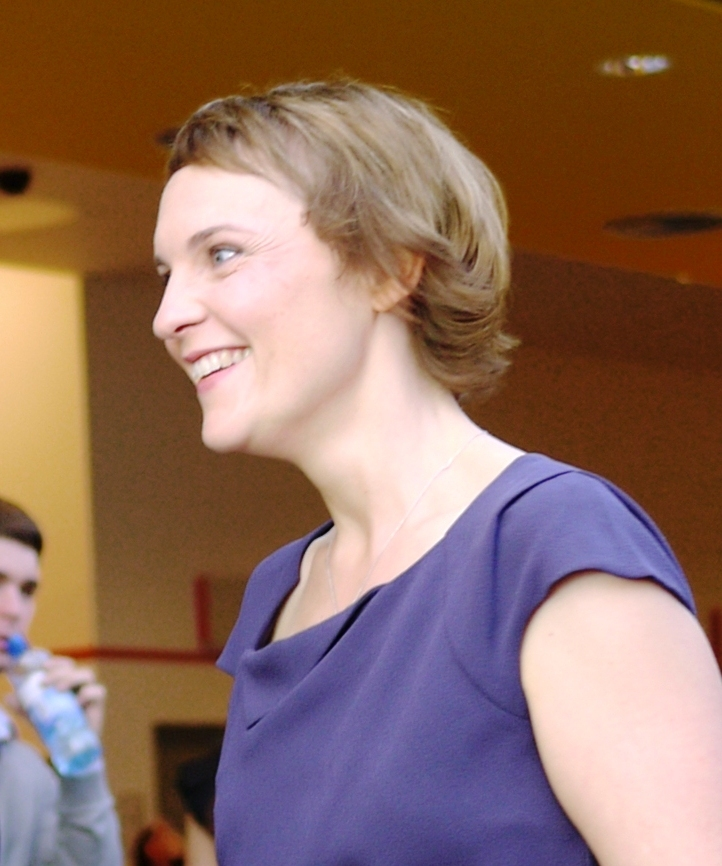
Justine Thornton

Marc Quinn
- Morwenna Banks, actress
- Matt Brittin, former Vice-president at Google and Director-General of the BBC
- Nick Clegg, former Deputy Prime Minister of the United Kingdom and former Leader of the Liberal Democrats
- Mauro Galetti, Brazilian ecologist
- Malcolm Gaskill, historian
- Ben Habib, politician, former Brexit Party Member of the European Parliament
- Greg Hands, politician, former Chief Secretary to the Treasury
- Charles Hart, songwriter and musician
- Marko Attila Hoare, historian
- Konnie Huq, television presenter
- Tim Lenton, climate scientist
- Anthony Peter Lowe, chief executive officer at Prostate Cancer Foundation of Australia
- Tim Luckhurst, journalist and former editor of The Scotsman, Principal of South College, Durham
- Sarah MacDonald, former Organ Scholar and first female Director of Music in an Oxbridge College (Selwyn College)
- Toby Marlow, co-writer of the West End musical Six, about Henry VIII's wives.
- Kate Pickett, epidemiologist
- John Pritchard, Olympic and World rowing medallist
- Marc Quinn, artist
- Justine Thornton, High Court Judge and wife of the former Leader of the Opposition Ed Miliband
- Sam Wallace, journalist
- Robert Webb, comedian, writer
- Andy White, musician and poet

=== Fellows ===
- G. E. Berrios, neuropsychiatry and epistemology of psychiatry
- Myles Burnyeat, ancient philosopher (honorary fellow)
- Dame Athene Donald, Deputy Head of the Cavendish Laboratory
- Albrecht Fröhlich FRS, mathematician
- Morna Hooker, Emerita Lady Margaret's Professor of Divinity and first female holder of the Cambridge DD
- Peter Kornicki FBA, East Asian Studies
- Alan Mycroft, computer scientist, co-author of the ARM chip's Norcroft C compiler and trustee of the Raspberry Pi Foundation
- David Papineau, philosopher and academic
- Julie Smith, Baroness Smith of Newnham, Politics and International Studies, member of the House of Lords
- Jeremy Thurlow, composer

In addition, the writer Valerie Grosvenor Myer, although not formally a Fellow, supervised English students at Robinson in the 1980s.

=== List of Wardens ===
- Jack Lewis, Baron Lewis of Newnham (1977 to 2001)
- David Yates (2001 to 2021)
- Richard Heaton (from 1 October 2021)

== See also ==
- List of organ scholars
- Listed buildings in Cambridge (west)
