= Anthony Lowe =

Anthony Lowe may refer to:

- Anthony Peter Lowe (born 1962), British-Australian mathematical physicist and actuary
- Ernest Anthony Lowe (1928–2014), British economist
