= Adam Elshaug =

Professor Adam Elshaug
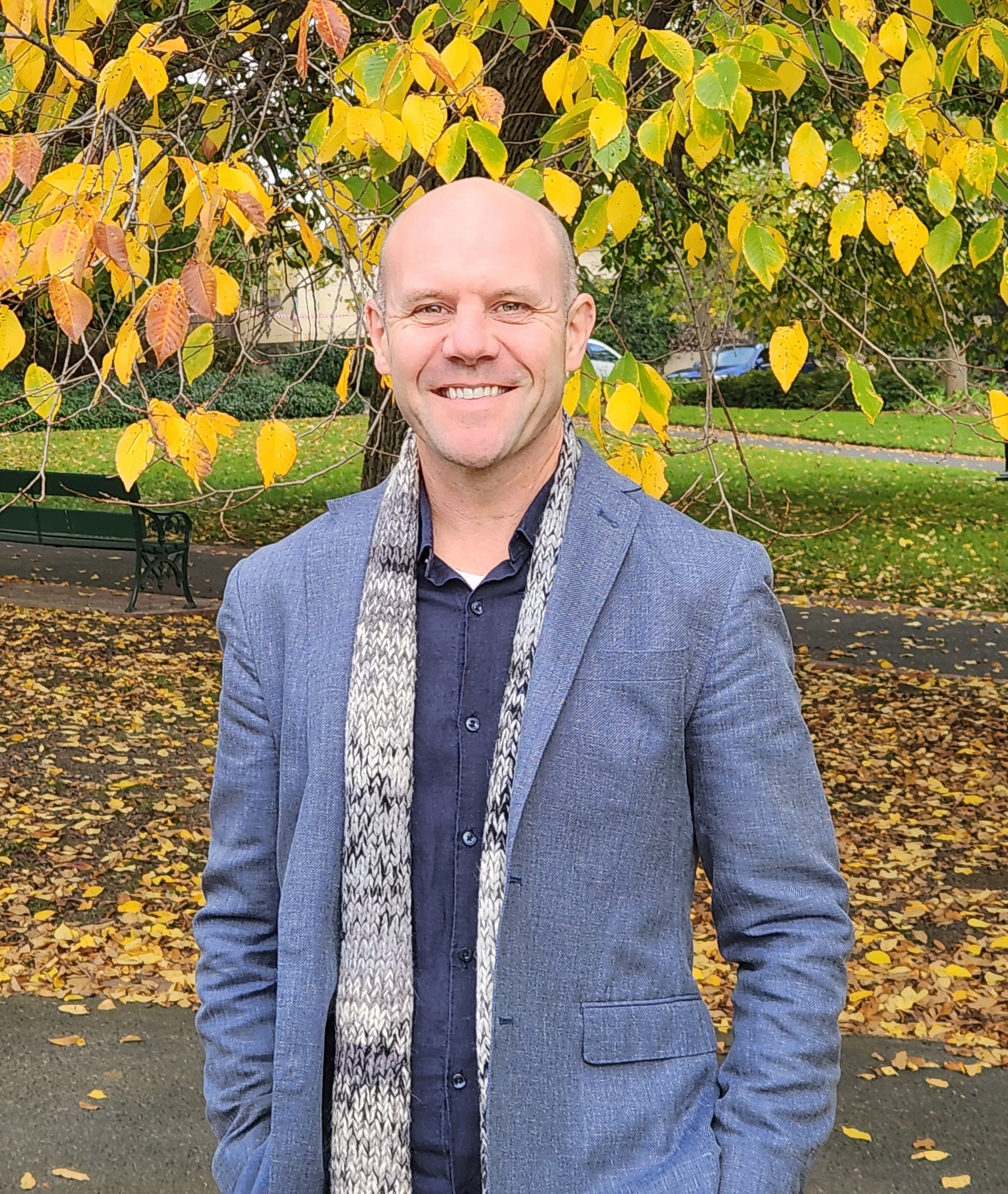
- Adam Elshaug, 2023
- Born: 1974 (age 51–52); Mount Gambier, South Australia
- Citizenship: Australian

Academic background
- Education: University of South Australia; University of Adelaide

Academic work
- Discipline: Health services, Policy research

Adam Elshaug (born 1974) is an Australian academic professor and Chair in Health Policy at the University of Melbourne. His research includes health system safety and efficiency, with a focus on measuring and reducing waste and low-value care for optimisation of value in healthcare delivery.

== Early life and education ==
Born in Mount Gambier, South Australia, Elshaug earned his BA in Psychology and Sociology from the University of South Australia. He further attended the University of Adelaide, and obtained his BSc.(Hons) in Physiology and a Master of Public Health. He then earned his PhD in Health Economics and Policy also from the University of Adelaide in 2007.

== Career ==
In 2010, Elshaug was selected as the Commonwealth Fund Harkness Fellow in Health Care Policy and Practice at the Agency for Healthcare Research and Quality.

Elshaug returned to Australia in 2013 and became the Head of the Value in Health Care Division (Lab) and Associate Professor of Healthcare Policy, and was awarded the HCF Research Foundation Principal Research Fellowship, at the Menzies Centre for Health Policy at the University of Sydney. In 2016, he was appointed Professor and became co-director of the Menzies Centre for Health Policy at the University of Sydney.

In 2019-20, Elshaug was a Visiting Fellow at the Economics Studies’ Brookings Schaeffer Initiative for Health Policy at The Brookings Institution in Washington DC. Since 2014, he has been a non-resident Senior Fellow at the Lown Institute in Massachusetts, serving as an economic and policy advisor to Cancer Australia.

In September 2020, Elshaug joined the University of Melbourne as Professor and Chair in Health Policy and Director of the Centre for Health Policy in the Melbourne School of Population and Global Health (MSPGH), also holding a joint Chair appointment in the Melbourne Medical School. He remains an Honorary Professor at the Menzies Centre for Health Policy and Economics at the University of Sydney.

== Research and advocacy ==
Elshaug's research is focused on improving safety and efficiency within health systems, with an emphasis on measuring and mitigating waste, including low-value care, to optimise value in health care utilising administrative health data. His applied policy approach involves collaborating with policy stakeholders to develop and implement reforms aimed at reducing waste and enhancing safety and value in healthcare. This includes crafting and assessing alternative payment models.

Elshaug's policy roles include being a member of Australia's Strengthening Medicare Taskforce and Medicare Benefits Schedule Review Advisory Committee.

Elshaug has been actively engaged in advocacy for reducing low-value care appearing before the Australian Senate Select Committee on Health and participated in various media outlets, which addressed low-value health care in Australia.

== Awards and honours ==
In 2020, Elshaug received the Health Services Research Association of Australia & New Zealand (HSRAANZ)’s Health Services and Policy Research Impact Award, recognising notable contributions to health services research and policy application in Australia. In 2016, he was part of a team that received Research Australia’s Data Innovation in Health and Medical Research Award. In 2022, Elshaug was a finalist in the Health Services Research Award category at Research Australia’s Health and Medical Research Awards.
