= Anthony Peter Lowe =

Australian scientist (born 1962)

Anthony Lowe
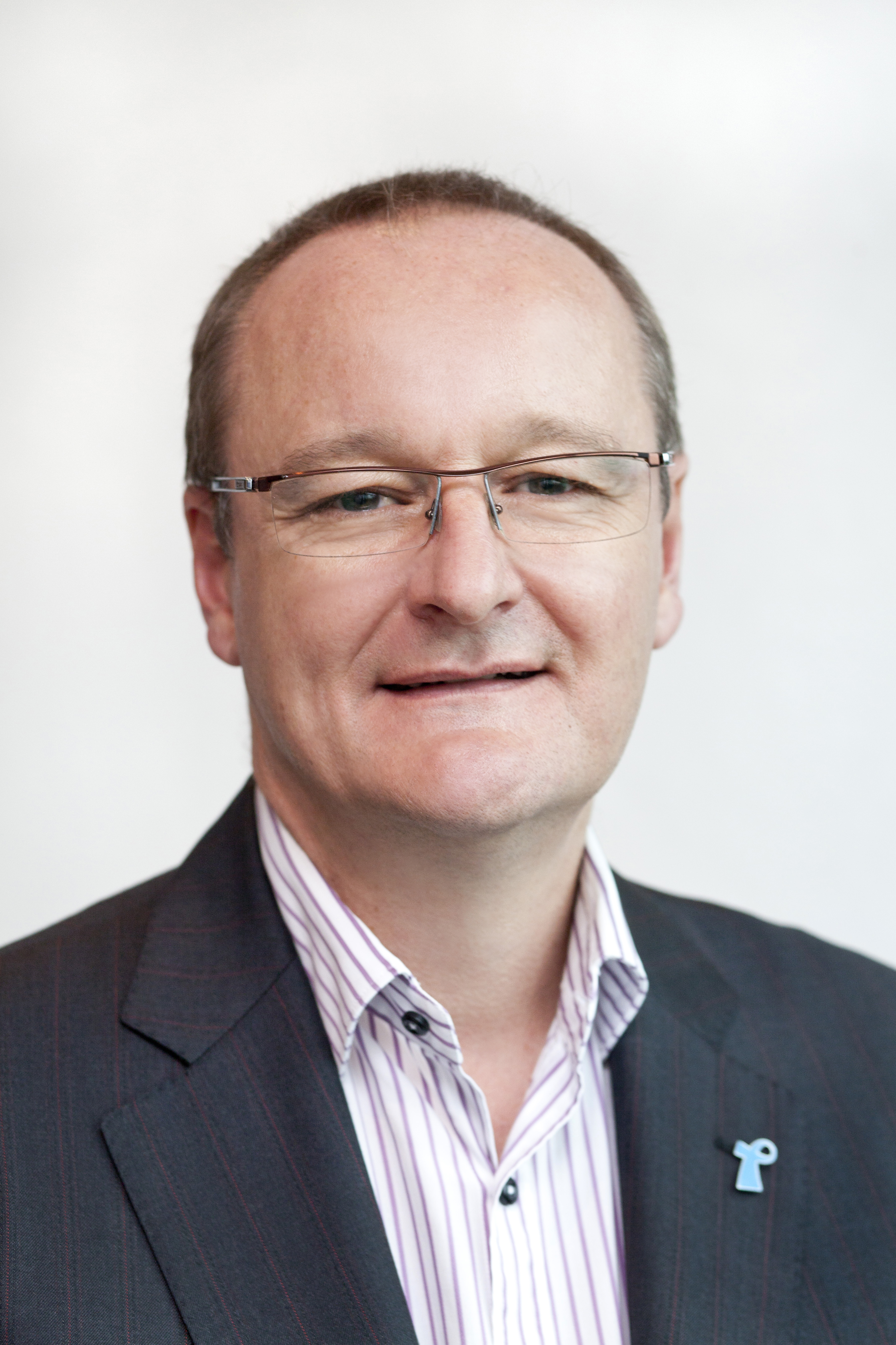
- Lowe in 2012
- Born: 16 March 1962 (age 64); Mtarfa, Malta
- Education: University of Cambridge (BA, MA, MMath), University of Southampton (PhD)
- Known for: Expertise in prostate cancer and PSA testing
- Spouse: Sarah Lowe
- Scientific career
- Fields: Prostate cancer, cancer control
- Workplaces: Prostate Cancer Foundation of Australia, Menzies Health Institute Queensland, Griffith University
- Doctoral advisor: Tony Hey

Anthony Peter Lowe AP (born 16 March 1962) is a British-Australian mathematical physicist and actuary. He previously was chief executive officer of the Prostate Cancer Foundation of Australia, and is a frequent media commentator on prostate cancer and prostate specific antigen (PSA) testing.

== Life and career ==
Lowe was born in Malta and attended The Perse School in Cambridge. He studied mathematics at the University of Cambridge, graduating in 1984 with a Master of Mathematics degree. He later obtained a Doctor of Philosophy in theoretical physics from the University of Southampton.

After completing his Ph.D., Lowe joined the firm R Watson & Sons, where he trained as an actuary. He was made Fellow of the Institute of Actuaries in 1990 and was appointed Partner at Watsons in 1991.

In 1994, Lowe moved to Sydney, Australia and joined AMP Limited's superannuation consulting division as the Investment Consulting Practice Leader. In this role, Lowe led a project, funded by AusAID, to advise the Kingdom of Tonga on the reform of their Civil Service Pension Scheme. He was subsequently appointed Program Director of a business change program in partnership with Andersen Consulting (now Accenture) to re-engineer AMP's corporate superannuation administration platform.

In 1998, Lowe joined Mercer, where he held multiple senior executive roles. He was appointed a Worldwide Partner in 1998 and executive director of Mercer's Australian business in 2001. From 2002 to 2004, Lowe was seconded to Mercer's US business as US Benefits Administration Practice Leader based in Princeton, New Jersey.

Lowe's ultimate role at Mercer was Asia-Pacific Business Group Leader, Mercer Wealth Solutions with responsibility for Mercer's benefits administration businesses in Australia, New Zealand and Hong Kong, including the Mercer Super Trust and Mercer Portfolio Service.

In 1999, Lowe was made a Fellow of the Institute of Actuaries of Australia. He has been a member of the institute's Leadership & Career Development Committee and as a member and Convenor of the Public Policy Council Committee. He has contributed to the development of the institute's public policy, particularly in health.

In 2007, Lowe moved to the non-profit sector and was appointed chief operating officer at the National Breast Cancer Foundation. Here he led the design and implementation of the integrated website and customer relationship management systems for the Pink Ribbon Breakfast campaign and Register4, Australia's first online community for volunteer breast cancer research participants.

From 2011 to 2018, Lowe was chief executive officer at Prostate Cancer Foundation of Australia (PCFA). In this role, he pursued an agenda of ensuring its activities and programs are based on the latest available scientific and medical evidence. During his tenure, PCFA established its Prostate Cancer Specialist Nursing Service which he worked to grow to 45 nurses nationally over five years.

Lowe has made contributions to prostate cancer survivorship research in partnership with Professor Suzanne Chambers, particularly the development of ProsCare, a psychological care model for men with prostate cancer, and research into the financial implications of treatment for prostate cancer. In 2012, he was appointed Adjunct Associate Professor at Menzies Health Institute Queensland, Griffith University. From 2012 to 2018, he was co-lead with the Chambers of the National Health and Medical Research Council (NHMRC) Centre of Research Excellence in Prostate Cancer Survivorship. Lowe has also supported the development of resources and peer support groups to meet the particular needs of gay and bisexual men, and men from culturally and linguistically diverse - including Aboriginal and Torres Strait Islander- communities with prostate cancer.

Lowe was project convenor, co-convenor with Professor Ian Olver, and a member of the Expert Advisory Panel for the development of national clinical practice guidelines on PSA testing and early management of test-detected prostate cancer. The guidelines were highlighted by Cancer Council Australia and PCFA to build consensus around approaches to PSA testing within Australia's prostate cancer screening program. The guideline recommendations were approved by the chief executive officer of NHMRC and published in January 2016.

Lowe is a member of the ANZUP Cancer Trials Group. From 2015 to 2018, he worked to secure funding for ANZUP's Australian-first clinical trial of 177Lu-PSMA treatment for prostate cancer. The trial began recruiting subjects in September 2019.

In 2016, Lowe was appointed non-executive director and company secretary at Ensemble Offspring, an Australian new music group.

Lowe is the nephew of biologist and ichthyologist Rosemary Lowe-McConnell.

== Selected publications ==
- Research, Awareness, Support: Ten Years of Progress in Prostate Cancer
- Prostate Cancer: The Next Generation
- Prostate Cancer Information Needs of Australian Gay and Bisexual Men
- Culturally and Linguistically Diverse Communities and Prostate Cancer
- Advancing Prostate Cancer Survivorship Research in Australia
- Clinical Practice Guidelines for PSA Testing and Early Management of Test-Detected Prostate Cancer
- Advocacy, Support and Survivorship in Prostate Cancer

== Fellowships ==
- Fellow of the Institute of Actuaries
- Fellow of the Institute of Actuaries of Australia

== Awards ==
- Scholar of Robinson College, Cambridge
- 2013 Melville Actuaries Summit Prize
