= David Yates (legal scholar) =

British solicitor and academic (born 1946)

Anthony David Yates (born 5 May 1946) is a British solicitor and academic. He was Warden of Robinson College, Cambridge for twenty years between 2001 and 2021. Previously, he was Professor of Law at the University of Essex from 1979 to 1987, Dean of its School of Law from 1979 to 1984, and Pro-Vice-Chancellor of the university from 1985 to 1987. He was a partner at Baker & McKenzie from 1987 to 2001, and Chief Operating Officer of the law firm from 1998 to 2001.

Academic offices
Preceded by Jack Lewis, Baron Lewis of Newnham	Warden of Robinson College, Cambridge; 2001--2021	Incumbent
