= Tim Luckhurst =

British journalist (born 1963)

- Born: Timothy Colin Harvey Luckhurst; 8 January 1963 (age 63); Sheffield, South Yorkshire, England
- Education: Robinson College, Cambridge
- Occupations: Journalist and academic
- Employer(s): Durham University, BBC
- Spouse: Dorothy (née Williamson)
- Children: 4

Timothy Colin Harvey Luckhurst (born 8 January 1963) is a British journalist and academic, currently principal of South College of Durham University and an associate pro-vice-chancellor. Between 2007 and 2019 he was professor of Journalism at the University of Kent, and the founding head of the university's Centre for Journalism.

Luckhurst began his career as a journalist on BBC Radio 4's flagship Today programme before being part of the team that designed and launched BBC Radio 5 Live. Between 1995 and 1997, he was bi-media editor of national radio and television news programmes at BBC Scotland. He joined The Scotsman newspaper in 1997 as Assistant Editor (News) and was promoted to the role of Deputy Editor in 1998, before briefly becoming the editor in 2000.

== Early life and career ==
Luckhurst was born in Sheffield, South Yorkshire, England. He was educated at Peebles High School in the Scottish Borders. He studied history at Robinson College, Cambridge, graduating in 1983.

Between 1985 and 1988 he worked as parliamentary press officer for Donald Dewar (then Shadow Secretary of State for Scotland) and for the Scottish Labour group of MPs at Westminster. He stood as the Labour candidate for the Roxburgh and Berwickshire constituency at the 1987 general election. He was critical of the party in 2001 and joined the Scottish Conservatives in 2005.

== Career ==
=== Journalism ===
Between 1987 and 1995, Luckhurst worked for the BBC on Radio 4's Today and was a member of the editorial team that designed and launched BBC Radio 5 Live. He covered the Romanian Revolution and the First Gulf War. He was the BBC's Washington, D.C. producer during the first year of the Clinton presidency and reported on the Waco Siege for BBC Radio. From 1995 to 1997 he was editor of national radio and television news programmes at BBC Scotland. Later he reported on the liberation of Kosovo and the fall of Slobodan Milošević for The Scotsman. Luckhurst joined The Scotsman as Assistant Editor in January 1997. He became Deputy Editor in January 1998 and was appointed Acting Editor in January 2000. He served as editor of The Scotsman between February and May 2000. Luckhurst was diagnosed with clinical depression and took medical leave. He claimed to have been "sacked as a direct consequence of my diagnosis".

Luckhurst is the author of Reporting the Second World War – The Press and the People 1939–1945 (London, Bloomsbury Academic 2023) This Is Today – A Biography of the Today Programme (London, Aurum Press 2001) and Responsibility Without Power: Lord Justice Leveson's Constitutional Dilemma (Abramis Academic 2013) and co-wrote Assessing the Delivery of BBC Radio 5 Live's Public Service Commitments (Abramis Academic 2019).

In 2010, Luckhurst wrote a chapter Compromising the First Draft for the book Afghanistan War and the Media. In 2017, he contributed a chapter entitled Online and On Death Row: Historicising Newspapers in Crisis to the Routledge Companion to British Media History. He also contributed a chapter to the book, The Phone Hacking Scandal: Journalism on Trial. This chapter formed the basis of his submission to the Leveson Inquiry.

He has written for various publications including The Independent, The Guardian, the New Statesman, The Spectator, The Times, The New Republic, The Los Angeles Times , and The Globe and Mail.

=== Academic career ===
In June 2007 he became professor of journalism and the news industry at the University of Kent's new Centre for Journalism. Luckhurst's academic research explores newspaper journalism during the first and second world wars and the era of appeasement. He has published in journals including Journalism Studies, Contemporary British History, 1914–1918 Online: The International Encyclopedia of the First World War, British Journalism Review, Ethical Space: The International Journal of Communication Ethics and George Orwell Studies. In May 2017 Luckhurst gave the keynote lecture Inspiring Critical and Ethical Journalism at the Orwell Society's annual conference. His work has also been published in academic collections including Writing the First World War after 1918.

At Kent, Luckhurst was a member of the team that launched KM Television, a local television station for Kent and Medway. In 2012, Luckhurst was quoted by The New York Times about the BBC's changes to its journalistic standards and bureaucratic procedures. Luckhurst stated that the BBC "wanted systems that could take responsibility instead of people". As Head of the University of Kent's Centre for Journalism, Luckhurst led opposition to Lord Justice Leveson's proposal for officially sanctioned regulation of the British press. In Responsibility without Power: Lord Justice Leveson's Constitutional Dilemma he argued that "An officially regulated press is the glib, easy, dangerous solution. It would spell the slow, painful death of a raucous, audacious and impertinent press able to speak truth to power on behalf of its readers and entertaining enough to secure their loyalty".

In November 2019 he joined Durham University as the principal of the new South College, and associate pro-vice-chancellor (engagement).

In December 2021 Luckhurst was involved in controversy over a Christmas formal held at Durham University's South College, during which Luckhurst's friend Rod Liddle was invited to speak. Liddle's speech included remarks that "a person with an X and a Y chromosome, that has a long, dangling penis, is scientifically a man" and "colonialism is not remotely the major cause of Africa's problems, just as [...] the educational underachievement of British people of Caribbean descent or African Americans is nothing to do with institutional or structural racism", prompting accusations of transphobia and racism. Some students left in protest before Liddle began to speak and several more left during his speech. Luckhurst shouted at students who walked out before the speech, calling them "pathetic". Luckhurst stepped back from some duties while the university investigated. Upon the conclusion of the investigation Luckhurst resumed all his duties as principal of the college and associate pro-vice-chancellor, and the report was left unpublished. The Times stated that a shift to calling for Luckhurst's resignation was understood to have taken place after his wife, Dorothy, branded students "a bunch of inadequates".

== Board memberships ==
Luckhurst is a member of the editorial board of the media outlet The Conversation UK, and a member of the Advisory Council of Don't Divide Us, an organisation that promotes a "colour-blind" approach to anti-racism and critiques the implementation of Critical Race Theory in public institutions.

== Media ==
=== BBC Scotland ===
In July 2022, Luckhurst called former BBC Scotland lawyer Alistair Bonnington "astute and brave" following Bonnington's claim that the corporation was "slavishly biased in favour of the SNP who now form the devolved Holyrood government".

== Personal life ==
In 1989, Luckhurst married Dorothy Williamson, who stood as the Conservative Party candidate in Blaydon in the 2005 general election, having been on the Conservative A-List.

The couple have four children; three daughters and one son. One of their daughters, Phoebe, is an author and features editor at the Evening Standard.

Media offices
Preceded by Alan Ruddock	Editor of The Scotsman; 2000	Succeeded by Rebecca Hardy
