= Sam Wallace (journalist) =

British sports journalist

- Born: Stevenage, Hertfordshire, England
- Education: Robinson College, Cambridge
- Alma mater: University of Cambridge
- Occupation: Sports journalist
- Writing career
- Language: English
- Genre: Sports journalism
- Notable work: Chief Football Writer at The Daily Telegraph
- Notable awards: British Sports Journalism Awards – Scoop of the Year, Football Journalist of the Year (2021); The Press Awards – Hugh McIlvanney Sports Journalist of the Year, Sport News Story of the Year (2021)

Sam Wallace is a British sports journalist, the Chief Football Writer at the Daily and Sunday Telegraph since 2015. In 2021, he was the recipient of the Scoop of the Year and Football Journalist of the Year at the SJA Awards, as well as the Hugh McIlvanney Sports Journalist of the Year and Sport News Story of the Year at The Press Awards.

== Early life and education ==
From Stevenage, Hertfordshire Wallace graduated from Robinson College, Cambridge with a degree in English literature. The son of an English teacher at The Barclay School, Stevenage, Wallace was a schoolboy peer of professional golfer Ian Poulter. Poulter wrote in his autobiography No Limits: My autobiography that the pair would play together on the right side of their school football team with Wallace at right back and Poulter at right midfield. Wallace would write match reports of their team's matches, some of which are still on display when Poulter revisited their school in 2013. Wallace was a ball boy for the England v Brazil game in March 1990, at Wembley Stadium. England won the game 1–0 with the solitary goal from Gary Lineker.

== Career ==
Wallace earned a place on the Telegraph graduate training scheme in 1999 and apart from six months at the Evening Standard as a news reporter, Wallace stayed at the Daily Telegraph for more than five years. Within that time, he worked as the paper's north-west football reporter, based in Manchester from January 2002. He agreed to join The Independent newspaper in December 2004. Wallace had worked up to become the Chief Football Correspondent for The Independent by the time he agreed to move back to the Daily Telegraph this time as Chief Football Writer, in the summer of 2015. His final articles for The Independent appearing in October 2015. Since returning to The Telegraph, Wallace has also appeared on their Total Football and Audio Football Club podcasts.

Wallace was nominated in the specialist correspondent category at the 2009 British Sports Journalism Awards. Wallace was nominated for Writer of the year at the 2014 Football Supporters Federation Awards. In 2015 he was nominated as Football Writer of the year at the Sports Journalist Awards and in 2016 he was highly commended in the football writer category. In 2018 and 2019 Wallace was nominated as Football Journalist. He received a highly commended recognition in both years. Wallace was nominated again in 2020 and earned the Bronze award. Wallace was shortlisted in the Best Writer category in the 2021 Football Supporters' Association awards.

A regular pundit on Sky Sports programme Sunday Supplement, in May 2020 a private conversation by the pundits over remote record during the COVID-19 pandemic was accidentally broadcast and included a comment by Wallace about why the singer Morrissey had been “basically cancelled”, for which presenter Geoff Shreeves had to apologise. Wallace has also appeared as a football pundit on the BBC Sport television and radio, as well as for the official podcast of London-based Premier League football club Crystal Palace F.C.

On 2 March 2021 it was announced that at the Society of Editors’ “The Press Awards” that Wallace was nominated twice, once for The Hugh McIlvanney Award for Sports Journalist of the year, and also for the Sports News Story of the year for his scoop in the Telegraph about ‘Project Big Picture’, designed by some to help the Premier League–Football League gulf.

Wallace worked with former England footballer Joe Cole on his 2025 autobiography Luxury Player. The book was nominated for Autobiography of the Year at the 2026 Sports Book Awards. He narrated the audiobook with Jason Flemyng and it was also nominated for Sports Audiobook of the Year at the awards.
