= Cancer Australia =

Australian government agency

- Founded: 2006
- Founder: Government of Australia
- Type: Governmental organisation
- Purpose: Cancer control
- Location: Surry Hills, New South Wales
- Region served: Australia
- Key people: Prof. Dorothy Keefe PSM MD, CEO
- Employees: 70
- Website: www.canceraustralia.gov.au

Cancer Australia is the lead cancer control agency to the Government of Australia. The organisation was founded to raise cancer awareness to support those affected by cancer within Australia and its territories. The main focus of the organisation is to advise the Government on cancer control, develop policies, and to assist those living with cancer. In order to accomplish this, Cancer Australia works with many government and non-government organisations.

Cancer Australia collaborates with a wide range of groups, including those affected by cancer, service providers with an interest in cancer control, as well as stakeholders. The agency also focuses on populations who experience poorer health outcomes, including Indigenous Australians living in remote areas within Australia. In August 2015 Cancer Australia, along with the Australian Government, launched the first national Children's Cancer website.

== Government organisations ==
Cancer Australia works in collaboration with the following federal government organisations:

- Department of Health
- Australian Institute of Health and Welfare
- National Health and Medical Research Council

In addition to these, Cancer Australia also works in collaboration on a state level with the following organisations:

- Australian Capital Territory Department of Health
- Cancer Institute of New South Wales
- Queensland Health
- Department of Health (Tasmania)
- Victorian Cancer Agency
- Department of Health (Western Australia), Cancer and Palliative Care Network

== Non-government organisations ==
Cancer Australia also collaborates with the following non-government organisations:

- Cancer Council Australia
- Breast Cancer Network Australia
- Cancer Voices Australia
- CanTeen
- Leukaemia Foundation
- Lung Foundation Australia
- Myeloma Foundation Australia
- National Breast Cancer Foundation
- Ovarian Cancer Australia
- Prostate Cancer Foundation of Australia

== See also ==
- Cancer
- List of Australian government entities
