= South College, Durham =

Constituent college of Durham University

South College
- Durham University
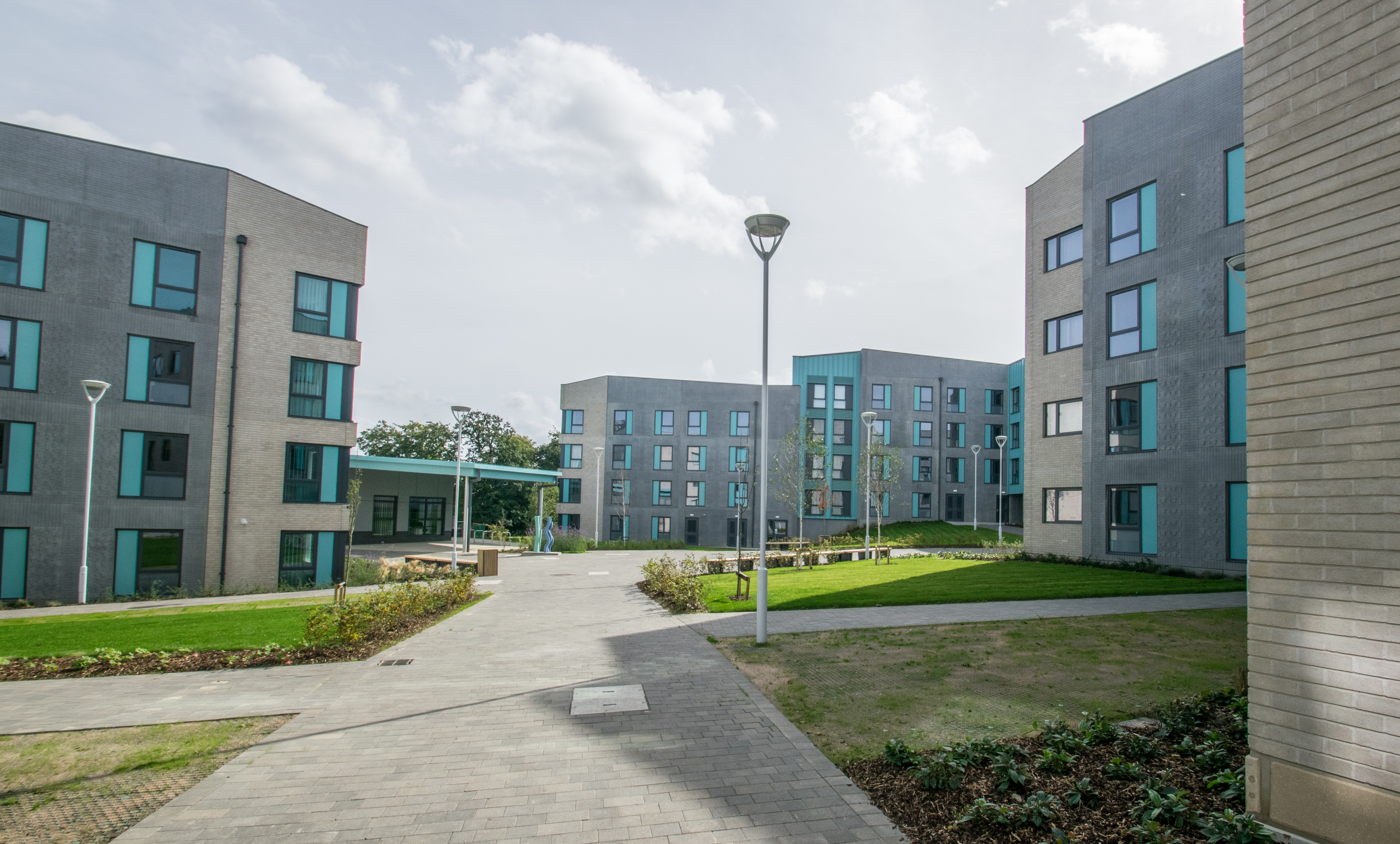
- College buildings in September 2020

- Arms of South College; Arms: Purpure between an Owl Close Guardant and a Cross Formy Quadrate both Argent a pile inverted conjoined with an orle of the second charged with a Torch enflamed of the first.
- Coordinates: 54.762°N 1.583°W
- Motto: Latin: Libertas, Aequalitas, Civitas Totius Mundi
- Motto in English: Freedom, Equality and Global Citizenship
- Established: 2020
- Named after: South Road, Durham
- Colors
- Principal: Tim Luckhurst
- Membership: 1,279
- Website: http://www.dur.ac.uk/south.college/

Map
- Location within Durham, England

South College is a constituent college of Durham University, England, which accepted its first students in Autumn of 2020.

It is located in Mount Oswald on Elvet Hill, to the south of Durham City, adjoining Van Mildert College and John Snow College.

== History ==
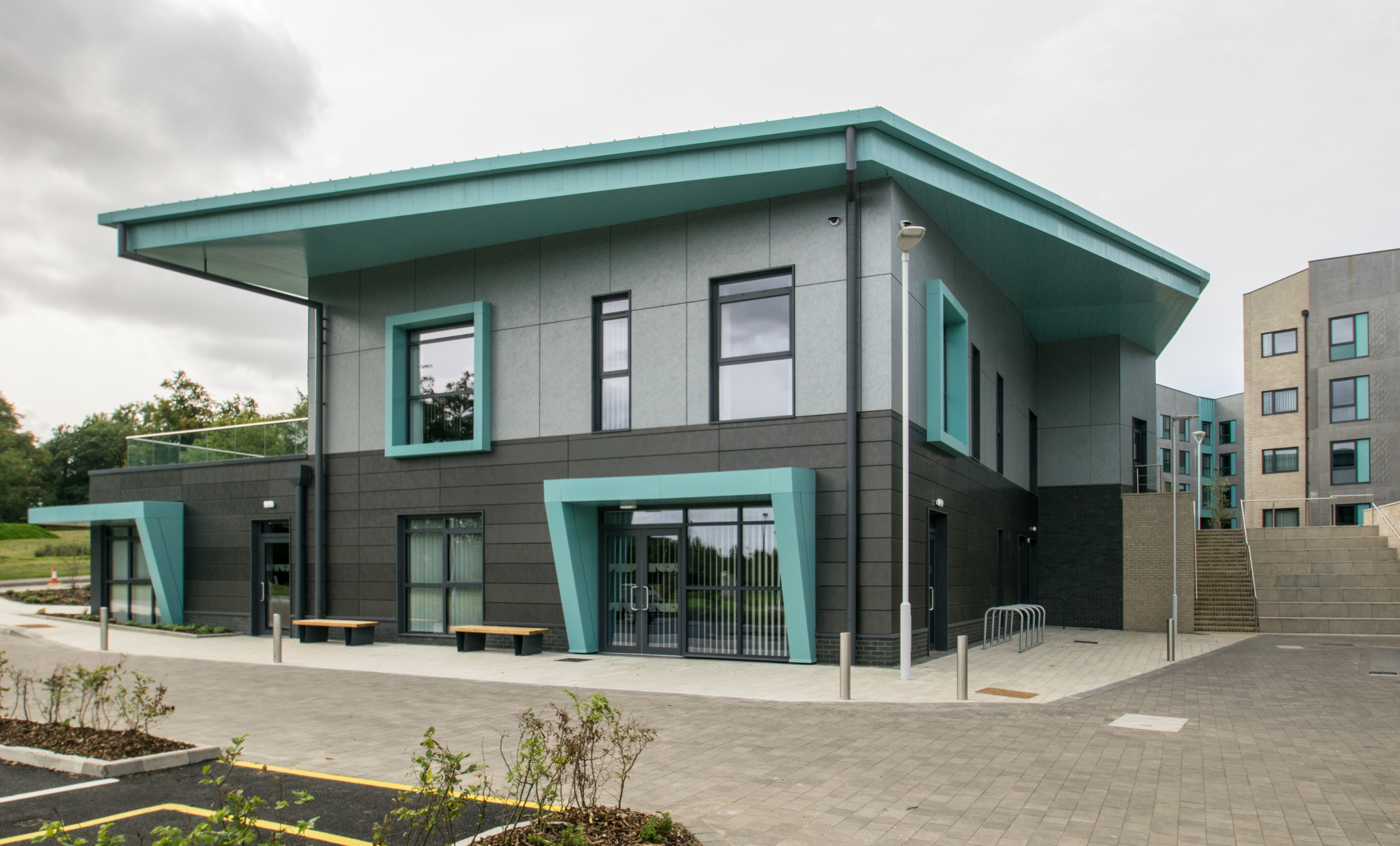
The Pitcairn Building contains college offices, the bar and library

The site was originally part of the grounds of Mount Oswald, a country house built in 1800. In 1928, the house and grounds were converted to a golf club, which closed in 2014, and was acquired for residential development.

In August 2017, Durham University announced that it had acquired part of the site in order to build two colleges, with construction to be carried out by a consortium led by Interserve. Construction began in September 2018, by which point it had been decided that these colleges would be one new college, South College, and a new home for John Snow College (formerly located on the university's Queen's Campus in Stockton-on-Tees).

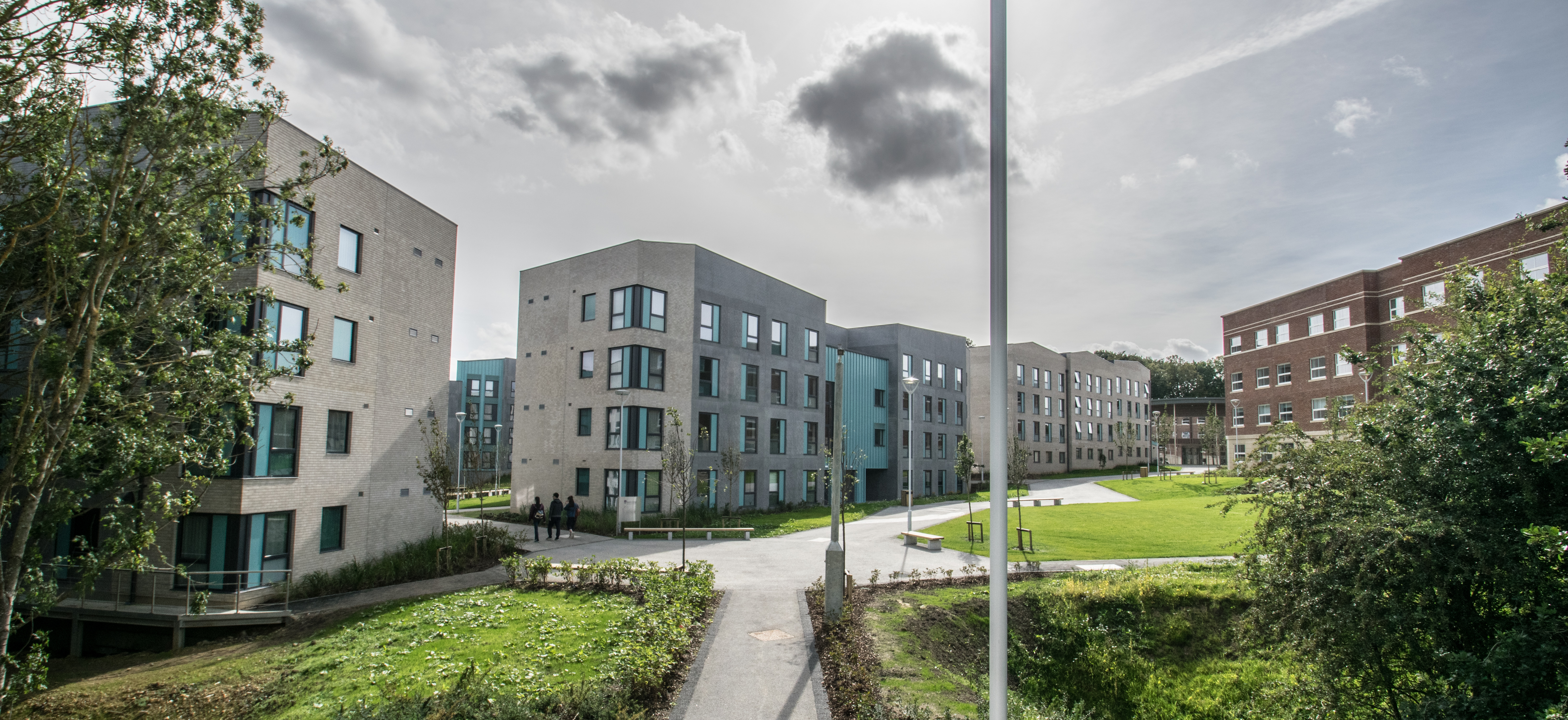
South College (left) and John Snow College (right) in September 2020

In November 2018, Interserve pulled out of the scheme, before going into administration in March 2019.

The college was designed to have an eventual size of 1,200, with 492 living in the college. As of the 2023/24 cohort, there are 1,279 members in South College. All accommodation is self-catered, in a mixture of single en-suite rooms and 'town houses' with shared bathroom facilities.

In March 2018, it was announced that naming of the college would be delayed in the hope that a financial donation might be attracted. The temporary name "South College" was assigned pending selection of a final name, and was used in advertisements for the new college's first principal. In June 2019, Durham Students' Union assembly voted to lobby for the college to be named after the late politician and Durham graduate Mo Mowlam. On 1 April 2020, Durham's student newspaper Palatinate published an April Fools' Day joke that South College was to be named Vine College after broadcaster and Durham alumnus Jeremy Vine. Vine himself was in on the joke and even released a video of him reacting to the 'announcement'.

On 5 July 2019 it was announced that University of Kent academic and former BBC editor Tim Luckhurst had been appointed as the first principal of the college.

In June 2020 a coat of arms for the college was announced, with the motto Latin: Libertas, Aequalitas, Civitas Totius Mundi, which translates in English to "Freedom, Equality and Global Citizenship".

The first students arrived at the college in September 2020, during the COVID-19 pandemic.

=== 2021 Rod Liddle controversy ===
On 3 December 2021, Rod Liddle, a controversial columnist, was invited to a Christmas formal dinner at South College. The students were not informed that Liddle would be a guest speaker. In his speech, later referred to as a "tirade", Liddle made controversial statements about student sex workers, trans rights, the idea of institutional racism, and colonisation. Several students decided to walk out before or during Liddle's speech. South College's principal Tim Luckhurst called these students "pathetic" and that they "shouldn't be at university", and his wife Dorothy called one student an "arse". Luckhurst received criticism both for the decision to invite Liddle to speak at the Christmas dinner, and for his behaviour towards students during and after the speech. Durham University announced an investigation into the events at the formal which concluded in January 2022.

== Buildings and facilities ==
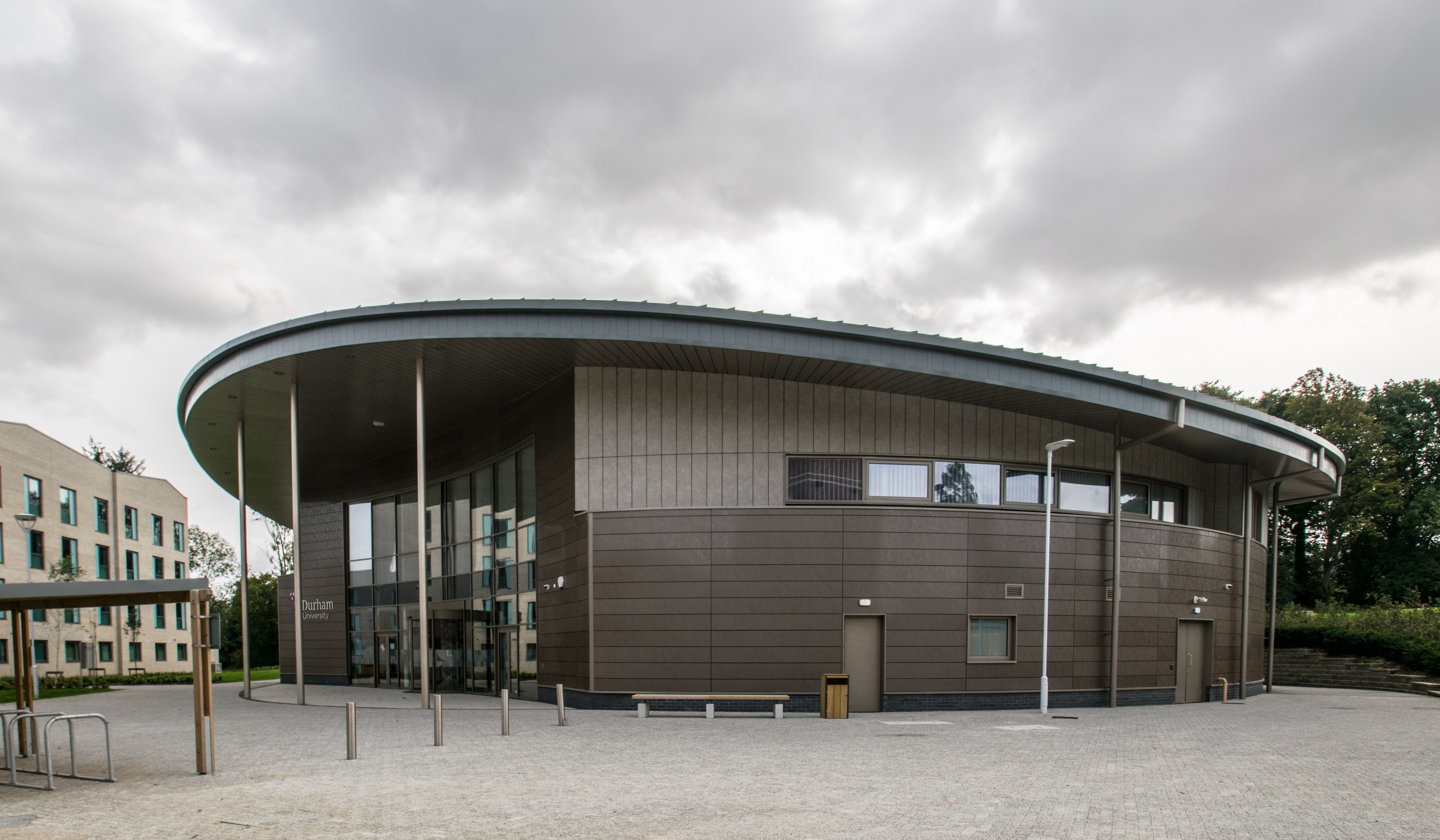
The Hub, facilities space shared with John Snow college

The college accommodation blocks are named for articles linked to the Southern hemisphere, or ideals in the college motto. They are:

- Centaurus (block B4) – named after the constellation Centaurus.
- Concordia (block B3) – named for the ancient Roman goddess of agreement Concordia.
- Earhart (block B5) – named after aviator Amelia Earhart.
- Gillard (block B2) – named for former Australian prime minister Julia Gillard.
- Lorde (block B5) – named after the American writer and civil rights activist Audre Lorde.
- Scorpius (block B4) – named after the constellation Scorpius.
- Shipley (block B1) – named for former New Zealand prime minister Jennifer Shipley.
- Sirius (block B4) – named after the star Sirius.

College facilities within the Pitcairn building include a library and study space, Café-Bar (colloquially known as "The Nest"), and a common room. Additionally, a gym, multi-use games area (MUGA) and music rooms are shared with John Snow college.

== Sports ==
On 16 March 2022, South College received their first collegiate silverware, with South College LFC winning the 2021/22 Durham University Women’s Floodlit Cup as part of a joint team with Trevelyan College WAFC. The side beat Josephine Butler WFC 3-1 in the Final at Maiden Castle, with the match streamed on the Palatinate YouTube Channel.

=== Boat club ===
South College Boat Club (SCBC) is the college rowing club, a registered Boat Club through British Rowing and a member organisation of Durham College Rowing.

In Durham, the club is a regular participant at Durham Regatta, races across the north east and Durham College Rowing events; including winning the Novice Cup (Women's) against UCBC in 2023.

SCBC was founded in 2020 and is based at the DUBC boathouse at Maiden Castle, and has a fleet of three 4x+ and 1x. It is on the River Wear.

== Traditions ==
South College has a carved wooden owl named Oswald, which is moved around the college to attend various events. He is present at the college matriculation of students, in which students pledge their allegiance to the college motto. At college formals, a toast is made to the owl, in which students shout 'to Oswald' and repeat the college motto.

== Art installations ==
- Conversation II by Nancy Frankel
- Ephesus by Vadmin Kharchenko

== List of principals ==
- 2019–present: Tim Luckhurst

== Notes ==
1. Officially recognised as Pantone 7648C by the South College JCR.
