= Prostate Cancer Foundation of Australia =

Australian non-profit organisation

- Type: Non-Profit
- Founded: 1996 in Lane Cove NSW
- Founder: Rotary Club of Lane Cove
- Headquarters: L3 39-41 Chandos Street; St Leonards NSW 2065; Australia
- Key people: Steve Callister (National Chairman); Chris Hall (National Deputy Chairman); Professor Jeff Dunn AO (CEO)
- Website: pcfa.org.au

Prostate Cancer Foundation of Australia is a broad-based community organisation and the peak national body for prostate cancer in Australia. The Foundation is dedicated to reducing the impact of prostate cancer on Australian men, their partners and families, recognising the diversity of the Australian community. Prostate Cancer Foundation of Australia receives Government funding for specific projects and relies on the generosity of individuals, the community and partnerships to carry out its work.

== History ==
Prostate Cancer Foundation of Australia was formed in Sydney in 1996. The television personality, Roger Climpson OAM, a member of the Rotary Club of Lane Cove, was treated successfully for prostate cancer in 1994. Roger was concerned by the confusing information available to him at the time of diagnosis and treatment and by the apparent lack of research into the disease being carried out in Australia. In 1996 he persuaded fellow club members to join him in forming the Prostate Cancer Research Foundation (PCRF) to raise funds for research.

Then in 1998 a committee of support group representatives from the greater Sydney and Newcastle area formed the Association of Prostate Cancer Support Groups (APCSG) that had a state focus but hoped to connect support groups nationally.

APCSG led by Max Gardner AM moved to affiliate with PCRF. As this occurred another NSW based fundraising group, the Australian Prostate Cancer Foundation (APCF) also emerged. In 1999 PCRF, APCF and APSCG merged under PCRF's corporate structure and the new name Prostate Cancer Foundation of Australia was chosen to reflect the organisation's widened agenda. Within this the APSCG maintained its own identity and autonomy.

It was not until 2001 that the relationship between the national support group movement and PCFA was clearly and formally established. At this point there were 40 support groups across the country. The key pivotal moment was an Inaugural Conference of Affiliated Prostate Cancer Support Groups (organised by PCFA) that provided the first national forum for support group representatives across Australia to connect and devise strategies to address priority issues for prostate cancer survivors and advance the broader movement. At this conference the support groups declared PCFA as the peak national body for prostate cancer and the Association of Prostate Cancer Support Groups became the Support and Advocacy Committee (now known as the National Support Groups Committee) within PCFA's governance structure.

== Work ==
Prostate Cancer Foundation of Australia works across three broad areas

- Promoting and funding world leading, innovative research into prostate cancer
- Implementing awareness and advocacy campaigns and education programs for the Australian Community, health professionals and Government
- Supporting men and their families affected by prostate cancer through evidence-based information and resources, Support Groups and Prostate Cancer Specialist Nurses.

=== Research ===
Prostate Cancer Foundation of Australia provides funding for prostate cancer research in Australia. The Foundation has a responsibility to the generous public who funds prostate cancer research; it must invest its research funds wisely. By consulting widely with Australian men with prostate cancer and those who care for them, the Foundation directs funds to research projects that best address their needs.

Prostate Cancer Foundation of Australia's research strategy promotes a long term approach to funding. Its overarching goal is to create and promote the uptake of knowledge that will improve the lives of Australian men with prostate cancer, their partners and their families.

The objectives of Prostate Cancer Foundation of Australia's research program are:

- Support men with prostate cancer, their partners and their families
- Contribute to the Foundation's work in advocacy, and its awareness and support programs

=== Awareness ===
Prostate cancer remains a significant killer of men in Australia yet understanding about the disease is lacking in many sectors of the broader population. A primary focus of Prostate Cancer Foundation of Australia's awareness activities is to inform the entire community about this important health issue.

==== Ambassador Program ====
The Ambassador Program is a community education program aiming to raise awareness of prostate cancer and provide resources from which participants can further their knowledge. Approximately one hundred ambassadors are currently trained to deliver presentations to the public about prevention and early detection, treatment options and challenges. The Ambassador Program operates in all States and Territories of Australia.

==== Evidence-based resources ====
Research conducted by Prostate Cancer Foundation of Australia in partnership with La Trobe University identified a need to target prostate cancer information toward different audience groups. As part of the Supporting men with prostate cancer through evidence-based resources and support project, a Cancer Australia initiative funded by the Australian Government, Prostate Cancer Foundation of Australia has produced a series of information booklets to cater to men with localised prostate cancer, men with advanced prostate cancer, partners and carers, gay and bisexual men, and younger men. Each series contains four booklets covering diagnosis, treatment, side effects and wellbeing. Each booklet can be read as a standalone resource or as part of the set. The resources are available through Prostate Cancer Foundation of Australia's support group network, hospitals, from Prostate Cancer Specialist Nurses, cancer centres and GPs. Prostate Cancer Foundation of Australia also provides translated key resources into five languages – Arabic, Chinese, Greek, Italian and Vietnamese and a flip chart for Aboriginal and Torres Strait Islander men.

==== National clinical guidelines ====
In partnership with Cancer Council Australia and a multi-disciplinary expert advisory panel comprising urologists, radiation oncologists, pathologists, general practitioners, medical oncologists, epidemiologists, allied health professionals and consumers, Prostate Cancer Foundation of Australia has developed national evidence-based clinical practice guidelines on PSA testing and early management of test-detected prostate cancer.

The guideline recommendations have been approved by the CEO of the National Health and Medical Research Council, Australia's leading expert body for developing health advice for the Australian community, health professionals and governments.

Prostate Cancer Foundation of Australia developed the guidelines in order to resolve the controversy surrounding PSA testing for both men and their doctors. The guidelines do not recommend a population screening program for prostate cancer (a program that offers testing to all men of a certain age group) as evidence does not support such a program. For men who decide to be tested it contains guidance on matters such as what age to start testing; how frequently to be tested; when to stop testing; the PSA level which should prompt further investigation; family history; and the role of the digital rectal examination.

=== Support ===
A central part of Prostate Cancer Foundation of Australia's activities is to support men and their families affected by prostate cancer through the development and delivery of evidence-based information and through its network of Support Groups and Prostate Cancer Specialist Nurses.

==== Support groups ====
Prostate Cancer Foundation of Australia's network of support groups has grown rapidly in recent years and now comprises over 150 affiliated groups across Australia, sharing information, providing encouragement and raising awareness amongst men diagnosed with prostate cancer and their families. Support groups provide reassurance to men with prostate cancer from others who have personal experience of the challenges they are facing. Men who attend support groups are able to talk through the pros and cons of treatment options with other men, compare their physical and mental wellbeing and outcomes, and benchmark their own progress along the cancer journey.

==== Prostate Cancer Specialist Nursing Service ====
The Prostate Cancer Specialist Nursing Service supports the placement of prostate cancer specialist nurses in a variety of Australian health care settings in partnership with health service providers.

The Prostate Cancer Specialist Nursing Service has been made possible thanks to funding from the Federal Government and generous local and community supporters.

Prostate Cancer Specialist Nurses work within an agreed Practice Framework and Competency Standards which are based on nationally recognised best practice models. Prostate Cancer Foundation of Australia is committed to providing ongoing professional development and support for the duration of the program.

Prostate Cancer Specialist Nurses work as part of a multidisciplinary team to provide a point of contact for men and offer continuity of care from diagnosis onwards. They see patients at any point during their cancer journey and help patients and their families to navigate the complex system of health services, make decisions about treatment options, and manage side effects of treatment.
